= Helen Rand Thayer =

Helen Chadwick Thayer (née Rand; October 3, 1863 – April 14, 1935) was an American suffragist and social reformer. A pioneer in the settlement movement era, she was a co-founder and president of the College Settlements Association (CSA). She was an alumnæ trustee of Smith College.

== Biography ==
Helen Chadwick Rand was born in Morrisania, Westchester County, New York (now the Bronx) on October 3, 1863. She was the daughter of Albert Tyler and Sophia Anna (née Chadwick) Rand.

She was educated in private schools in Brooklyn, New York; Adelphi Academy, Brooklyn; Burnham School, Northampton, Massachusetts. She graduated from Smith College with an A.B. degree, 1884. She did graduate studies in history at Newnham College, Cambridge, 1886-7.

She married Rev. Lucius Harrison Thayer, D.D., of Westfield, Massachusetts, on June 29, 1892. They had three children: Dorothy Goldthwait (b. 1893), Lucius Ellsworth (b. 1896), and Sherman Rand (b. 1904).

At the same time that Jane Addams and Ellen Gates Starr were starting Hull House in Chicago, a group of Smith College alumnæ, chief among whom were Thayer, Vida Dutton Scudder, Clara French, and Jean Fine Spahr, was pressing for the establishment of a settlement house in the Eastern U.S. In 1889, Thayer was a co-founders of the CSA, Rivington Street, New York City; she served as president of the CSA beginning in 1907. Thayer was also a member of Executive Board of the Federation of Settlements.

Active in the woman's suffrage movement, Thayer was a member of the Advisory Board of the New Hampshire Equal Suffrage Association, the College Equal Suffrage League, and the Portsmouth Equal Suffrage League.

Thayer was the vice-president of the Smith College Alumnæ Association, and an alumnæ trustee of Smith College (1901–07). During World War I, she was chair of the Smith College Relief Unit.

She was a member of the Association of Collegiate Alumnae, National Congress of Mothers, the Child Labor Society, Society of Charities and Correction, and Association for Labor Legislation. She served as director of the New Hampshire Children's Aid Society. She was a member of the New Hampshire State Commission for Belgian Relief. Thayer was involved with various civic, educational, and philanthropic societies, and was active in local women's clubs.

In religion, a Congregationalist, she was active in church and parish work, serving as president of the New Hampshire Congregational Conference.

For a time, Thayer made her home in Portsmouth, New Hampshire. She died at her home in Newton, Massachusetts on April 14, 1935, aged 71. Burial was at Westfield, Massachusetts.
