= Emily Sophie Brown =

American politician (1881–1985)

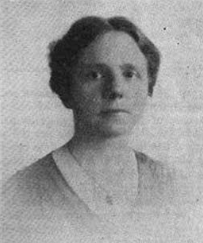

Member of the Connecticut House of Representatives from Naugatuck
- In office 1921–1923 Serving with Harry H. Schofield
- Preceded by: Thomas P. Reilly; Joseph L. Jackson
- Succeeded by: Thomas P. Reilly; Martin L. Caine

Personal details
- Born: October 18, 1881 New Milford, Connecticut, US
- Died: March 1, 1985 (aged 103) Naugatuck, Connecticut, US
- Party: Republican
- Education: Wellesley College (BA)
- Occupation: Politician

Emily Sophie Brown (October 18, 1881 – March 1, 1985) was an American politician who in 1920 became one of the first five women elected to the Connecticut House of Representatives. Brown subsequently served as a New Haven County commissioner from 1922 to 1927. She was a centenarian.

== Early life and education ==
Brown was born in New Milford, Connecticut, on October 18, 1881. Her parents were Episcopalian minister Edward Rutledge Brown and homemaker Sophie Tracy (Smith) Brown. Emily Brown attended public schools in Brooklyn and Stafford Springs and completed high school at St. Gabriel's School in Peekskill, New York. She studied music and Greek at Wellesley College and earned a Bachelor of Arts degree in 1904.

Settling in Naugatuck in 1910, Brown taught violin and volunteered for the local Republican Party, the Connecticut Women's Suffrage Association, and the women's auxiliary of the YMCA. Aspiring to become an Episcopal missionary in China, she received a certificate from the Church Training School of Philadelphia in 1918. The church instead sent her to Salt Lake City to lead religious education. She returned to Naugatuck several months later.

== Political career ==
In 1920, Brown was elected to the Connecticut House of Representatives as part of the nationwide Republican landslide in the 1920 United States presidential election. She was one of five women elected to the Connecticut House that year—the first year women had the right to vote.

With the other four women representatives, Brown prioritized education, child welfare, and prison reform during her single term in the legislature. She served as clerk of the General Assembly's Committee of Humane Institutions (which later became the public welfare committee) and introduced a bill, which became law, to create a state child welfare agency. In 1921, Brown became the first woman in Connecticut history to preside over a legislative session, wielding the speaker's gavel during a debate. House rules were suspended to enable members to address her as "Madam Speaker." "It was lots of fun up there being boss over all those men," Brown said at the time. "No, indeed, I wasn't rattled a bit." Although she had been active in the suffrage movement, she was seen as a moderate. "She wasn't necessarily a woman's libber," according to her cousin Emily Gibbs.

In 1922, Governor Everett J. Lake appointed Brown to serve out the term of late New Haven County commissioner Jacob Walters. Brown was elected to a four-year term as commissioner later that year. Serving until 1927, she oversaw the county's courthouses, jail, and orphanage. She published "The County Jail in Connecticut" in the Journal of Criminal Law & Criminology in 1926, calling for criminal justice reform. Brown was the Republican nominee for Naugatuck town warden in 1928 but lost the election by a large margin. It was her last campaign for elected office.

== Community service ==
Brown remained active in local politics and civic organizations throughout her life. She was involved in the League of Women Voters and League of Women Legislators. She served as vice chair of the Republican town committee in Naugatuck for 16 years and served as a founding member of the board of directors of the Naugatuck Chamber of Commerce. Passionate about child welfare and education, she served on the board of the Children’s Center of Hamden from 1927 to 1949 and spent several terms on the Naugatuck Board of Education on and off between 1920 and 1960. She was the first woman on the town's board of education. Brown also held various leadership roles at St. Michael's Episcopal Church, local women's clubs, the local preschool, the local chapter of the American Red Cross, the Consumers League of Connecticut, the Colonel Daniel Putnam Association, the Society of the Companions of the Holy Cross, and other organizations.

== Later life and death ==
Brown died after a long illness on March 1, 1985, in Naugatuck. She was 103 years old. She had lived in Naugatuck since 1910 with her sister, Carolyn Brown, who had died in 1945.

Brown was survived by three cousins and her long-time companion, Mrs. Marion Rollins. Brown and Rollins had lived together since 1960.
