= College Settlement of Philadelphia =

American outdoor camp and school

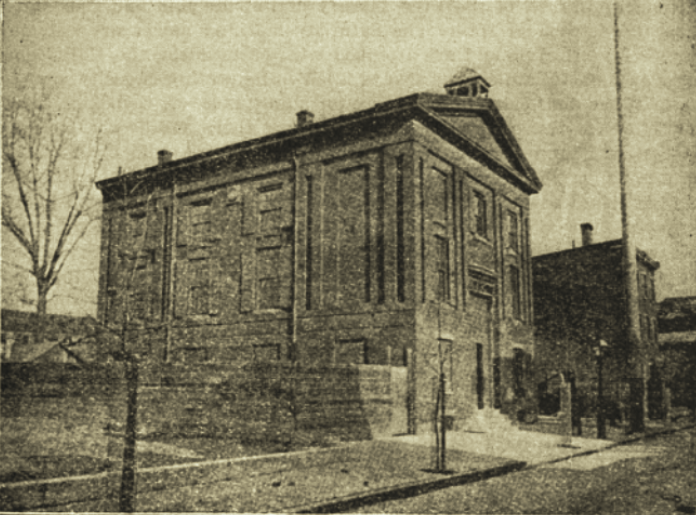
- Stuart Memorial Hall
- Formation: April 9, 1892
- Founded at: St. Mary's Street, South Philadelphia, Pennsylvania, US
- Purpose: social reform (original); outdoor camp and school (current)
- Headquarters: Horsham, Pennsylvania, US
- Coordinates: 40.04010°N 75.10116°W
- Parent organization: College Settlements Association (original)
- Website: collegesettlement.org

College Settlement of Philadelphia is an American outdoor camp and school located in Horsham, Pennsylvania. Established in 1892, it was originally associated with the settlement movement under the auspices of the College Settlements Association (CSA) to provide educational and social services in South Philadelphia, Pennsylvania, focusing on the mostly immigrant population of the neighborhood it served, and providing a home to the children and young people of the neighborhood.

== St. Mary Street ==
The Philadelphia Settlement was opened April 9, 1892, continuing the work of the St. Mary Street Library Committee. The St. Mary Street neighborhood was a flourishing center of African-American religious, education and political life in the early 19th century. However, the mid-19th Century bought continued mob attacks that destroyed many Black own homes and institutions.

During the 1842 mob attack the Second African Presbyterian Church on St. Mary's Street was set on fire, though it survived the attack. The congregation eventually sold the church and it became the Stuart Memorial Church. The College Settlement later purchased Stuart Memorial Church and called it Stuart Memorial Hall.

By 1892, when the College Settlement moved in, the neighborhood had experienced economic decline along with a remarkable growth of immigrants from Germany, Poland, and Italy. These groups, along with the existing African-American community, occupied the homes in the square bounded by Lombard and South, Sixth and Seventh Streets.

For some years, a group of earnest workers known as the St. Mary Street Library Committee had done effective work here, and they strongly felt that they could provide services for the community. Through the influence of the Committee in 1892, the Stuart Memorial Hall, the Starr Garden and other organizations, the College Settlement of Philadelphia was established.

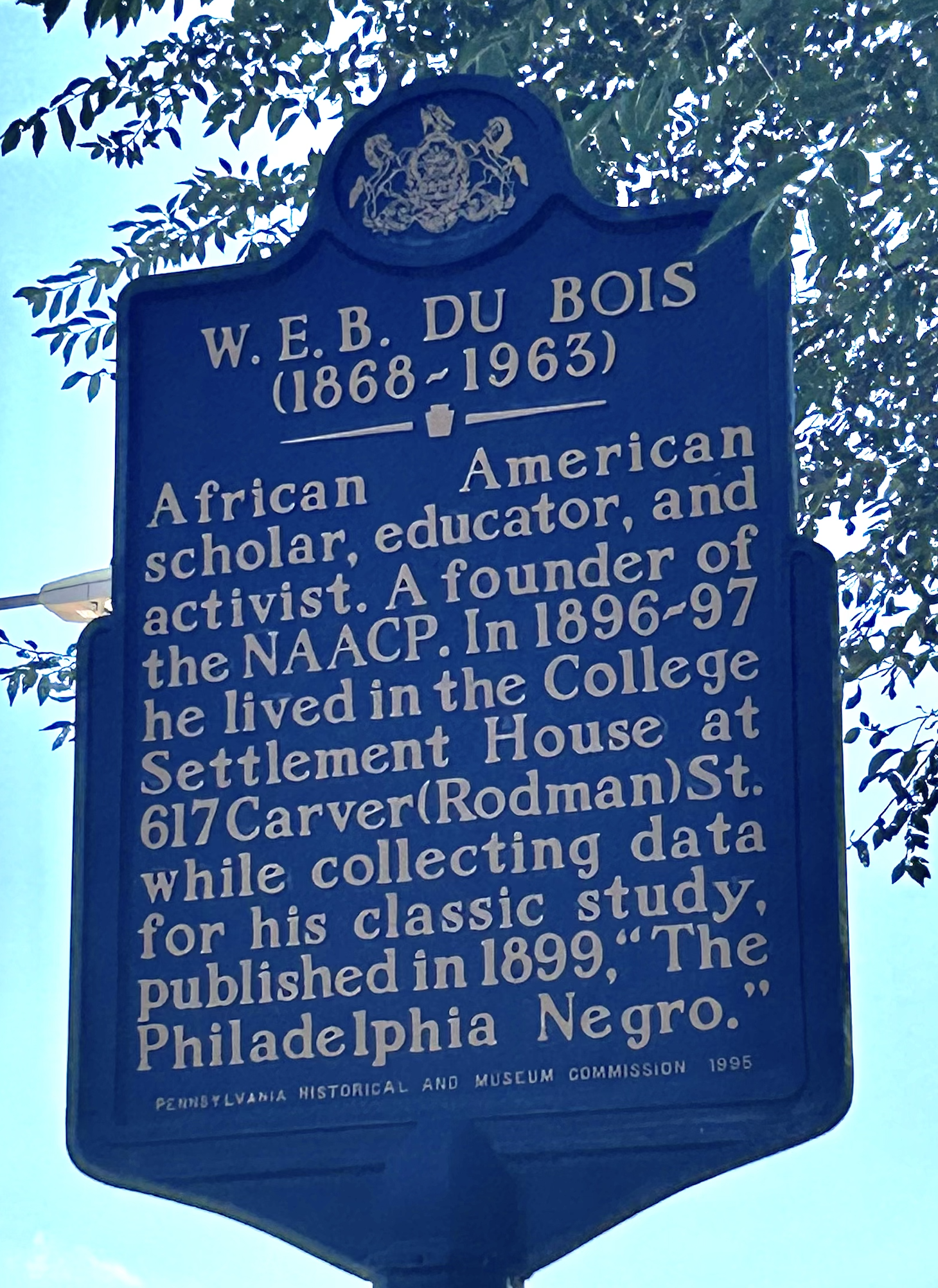
Historical marker noting where W.E.B. DuBois lived in Philadelphia while writing The Philadelphia Negro.

In 1893, a Fellow appointed by the College Settlement Association investigated the food question in the neighborhood and succeeded in getting 25 dietaries as a result of six months' work.

In 1896, the Settlement commissioned an investigation into the social and industrial condition of the African Americans of the Seventh Ward. Settlement member and University of Pennsylvania professor Samuel McCune Lindsay asked then Wilberforce professor W.E.B. DuBois to conduct the study. The results of this study were published as The Philadelphia Negro.

The years saw an increase of work and workers, which could be traced by looking at the schedules of former years. Lectures, classes, clubs and numerous other activities were a positive force. English classes met on Tuesday and Thursday nights. There was a children's sewing school.

The first summer Kindergarten was established by the city at the College Settlement of Philadelphia. It was so satisfactory that a branch of the James Forten School Kindergarten was permanently placed here, and is still very successful. There are two teachers and an enrolment of eighty-six children. The Settlement furnished assistants and bases its work and acquaintance with the women largely on this Kindergarten.

The settlement, in addition to its work among the people in its immediate vicinity, sought to aim activities of a more public and general character. The first year, various improvements were initiated, notably the repaving of St. Mary Street and other small streets in the vicinity. The question of enlarging the Starr Garden was agitated, the Councilmen of the district approved of the plan brought to their notice by the Settlement committee and other friends of the small parks movement. They reported the matter favorably to the City Councils, and the adjoining property was condemned.

The settlement moved out of the St. Mary Street neighborhood in 1898.

== After 1898 ==
By 1897, the address changed to 617 Carver Street.

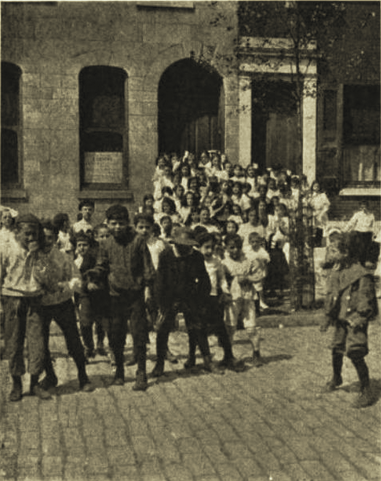
Christian Street House, College Settlement of Philadelphia (1915)

"We have no religious services. Each resident attends her own church, and we encourage our neighbors to do the same. Our influence is distinctly for religion, but not for any denomination or creed." -Katherine Davis, head worker, College Settlement of Philadelphia.

The CSA's 1904 Annual Report recorded the settlement's location as 433 Christian Street.

The Report included several disappointments. Between 1900 and 1904, the headworker had believed that one of the two graveyards in the vicinity of the Christian Street house was intended as the site of a gymnasium and playground, to be owned and managed by the Settlement until the city government was ready to municipalize such undertakings; however, this did not advance. In addition, no area has been secured for a gymnasium, even though there were only two small yards for out-of-door exercise, sports, and games. No site had been offered for a library building. But there was positive news, too. A new play yard was purchased, transformed, and put freely into use under the management of the Settlement. It was surrounded by a high fence, which made it practicable for girls' gymnastics, as the first yard, No. 429, was not. There was appreciation for the coöperation with other organizations, such as the Needle Work Guild, the Haverford Flower Mission, the Plant Flower and Fruit Guild, the Country Nursery, the Octavia Hill Association, the Society for Organizing Charity, the Alberta Home and other summer outing agencies. In the matter of finances, the year had not been an easy one. It was more difficult to meet an increasing expense account than to secure sporadic donations for special objects.

== Notable people ==
Headworkers at St. Mary Street included: Miss McLain, Dora Freeman, Helena S. Dudley, and Katharine B. Davis. Headworkers at Carver Street included: Myrta Jones and Anna F. Davies.

== See also ==
- Settlement and community houses in the United States
