= Casa de Castelar =

Settlement house in Los Angeles, California

Coordinates: 34.0627°N 118.2395°W

Casa de Castelar The College Settlement
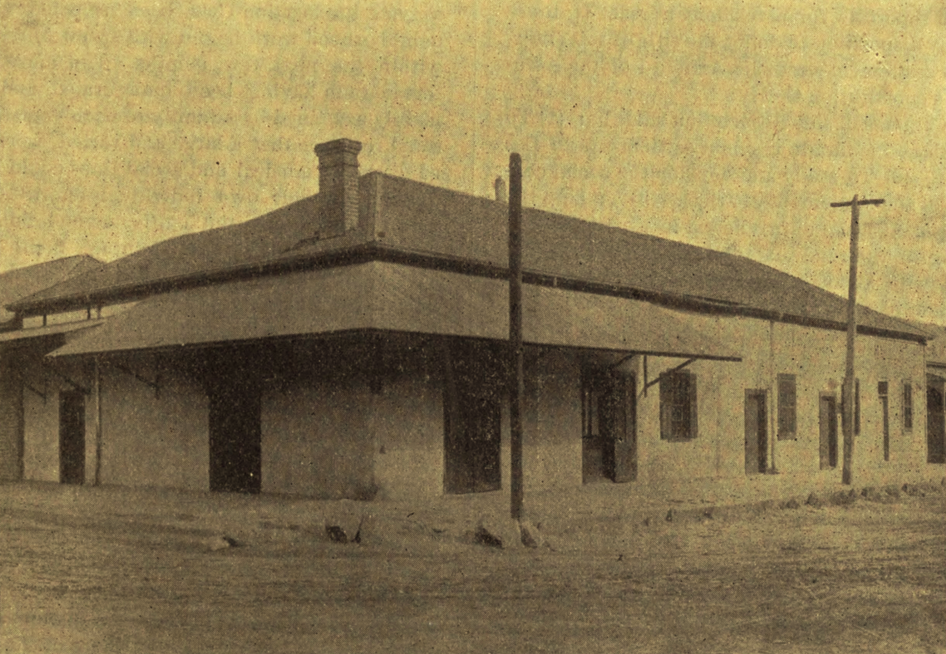
- Casa de Castelar (1897)
- Named after: Emilio Castelar
- Established: February 1894
- Dissolved: 1910
- Purpose: social reform
- Region served: Sonoratown, Los Angeles
- Parent organization: Los Angeles Settlement Association, a subsidiary of the College Settlements Association

Casa de Castelar (later, The College Settlement) was an American settlement in Los Angeles, California. It was founded in February 1894, during the settlement movement era, by a local branch of the College Settlements Association called the Los Angeles Settlement Association (LASA). (Note: According to Woods & Kennedy (1911), it was established by the Los Angeles Branch of the Association of Collegiate Alumnae.) Casa de Castelar was the first settlement house in the city, and the first settlement house west of the Mississippi River.

== Governance ==
According to the Association's constitution, "The objects of this Association shall be: (1) To establish and maintain resident settlements in Los Angeles. (2) To study and develop the social conditions of the settlement districts. (3) To help the privileged and the unprivileged to a better understanding of their mutual obligations. (4) To cooperate with all other agencies acting for the improvement of social conditions."

The settlement was supported by annual and monthly subscriptions and donations.

== Early history ==
Following Jane Addams' visit to Los Angeles in the early 1890s the College Settlement, the organization's original name, was established in a room on Alpine and Cleveland Streets by a group of college women who were familiar with the work of college settlements throughout the U.S., and also with the work of Hull House, Chicago Commons, Denison House, and other settlements of Europe and the U.S. The thirteen women were from the Los Angeles College alumnae organization. In the first year Evelyn L. Stoddard was president.

Asked why Sonoratown was chosen, spokesperson Maude B. Foster replied: "because we knew it to be the most exclusive and most conjested [sic] part of the city." She said that a daily kindergarten had been established, as well as "seven clubs embracing women and children of all nationalities. The Spanish-Mexican of every degree and calling, from the tamale maker to the skilled musician, the Italian frescoer and sculptor, the Frenchman, German and the Assyrian are all visitors to the settlement house."

For three years a growing social work was under way, and the group responsible for the effort was greatly encouraged and hopeful. Clubs included the Isabella club, for girls; La Primavera club, devoted by young men to music and social interactions; El Club Esperanza, for economic and social discussion by young unmarried people over 16 years of age. In addition, the Caroline M. Severance Kindergarten, a library, a savings bank, and several courses of lectures were also available.

== Neighborhood ==
The College Settlement was located in that quarter of Los Angeles which was once the pueblo-the original city, El Pueblo de Los Angeles. The people of the settlement district were a varied and uncertain quantity. Spanish-Mexican, Italian, French, Basque, Syrian, Slavonian, at different periods set up their Penates on Buena Vista Street or in Lopez Court. The people included lodging house inmates. The business interests were increasing and there was a possibility that this could become a business district almost exclusively.

Former locations of the settlement included: Alpine and Cleveland Streets (February 1894); 629 New High Street (1894); Casa de Castelar, Ord and Castelar Streets (December 1895-1898); and 428 Alpine Street (1898–1910).

== Building ==
After renting quarters at various points in the district north of the Plaza, adjacent to North Broadway, in 1897, a house was occupied in the pueblo in Sonoratown at the corner of Alpine and Castelar Streets and a settlement house with resident workers was established. Owned by the Los Angeles Settlements Association, it was purported to be the first adobe settlement building on record. At this time, College Settlement changed its name to Casa de Castelar, because it was located on Castelar Street and in honor of Emilio Castelar.

In that year, a deposit station of the Los Angeles Public Library opened at the settlement. Other offerings included a kindergarten, sewing clubs, industrial classes, lectures and musicals.

== Activities ==
The resident and volunteer workers of Casa de Castelar had a sense of social responsibility. Many of the public departments in the City of Los Angeles owed their development to the initiative and cooperation of these settlement workers.

1. The first public health nurse paid by any municipality in the U.S. was secured to Los Angeles by their efforts and as a result of their initiative. They secured a visiting nurse. They prevailed on the city to retain her when her worth had been demonstrated. They housed and fostered the work of the public health nurses when the number of nurses was increased, until, finally, the Municipal Nursing Division was made an integral prt of the City Health Department.
2. The first meeting to secure a juvenile court for Los Angeles County was held at Casa de Castelar and settlement workers devoted time and energy to the establishment of the court.
3. The creation of the Los Angeles Playground Department owe much to the cooperation and collaboration of these settlement workers.
4. The same may be said of the Housing Bureau of the City of Los Angeles. The preliminary survey for the creation of the bureau was made by the cooperation of the settlement workers with the Municipal League of Los Angeles.
5. The Casa de Castelar also gave inspiration to others to undertake settlement work in other sections of the city.
6. The first English classes for adults were held there and later transferred to the public school department.

In 1910, Casa de Castelar ended its settlement work only to find it in the larger life of the community activities which it created or helped create.

== Notable people ==
Some of the municipal workers associated with the settlement included:

- Bessie D. Stoddart, secretary, playground commission
- Evelyn L. Stoddart, chair, probation committee of juvenile court and on visiting nurses' committee
- Maud Foster Weston, director, visiting nurses
- Mary Adair Veeder, member, housing commission
- Mary H. Bingham, visiting nurses' committee and probation officer
- Louise Barber, probation officer

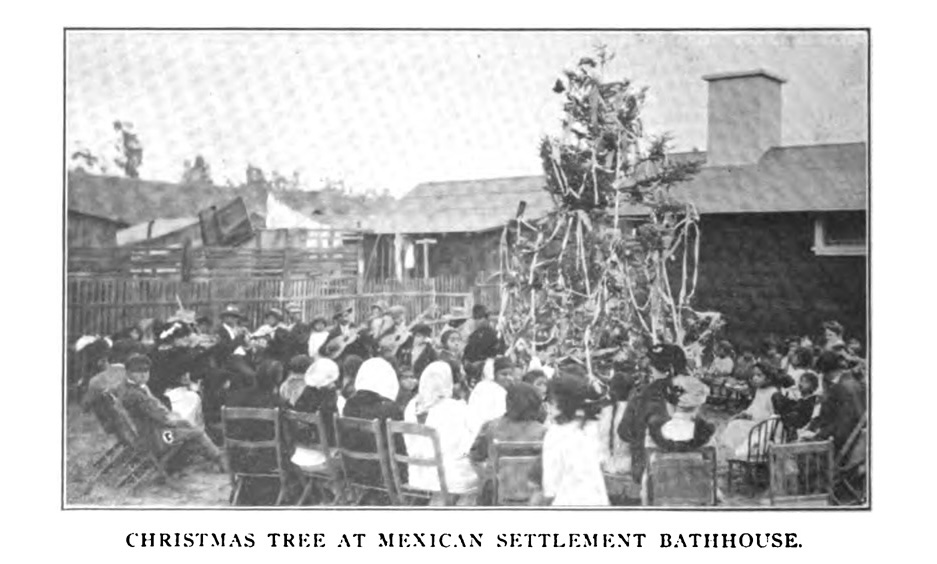
Christmas tree at "Mexican settlement bathhouse" in 1912

== See also ==
- Settlement and community houses in the United States
