= College Settlements Association =

- College Settlements Association
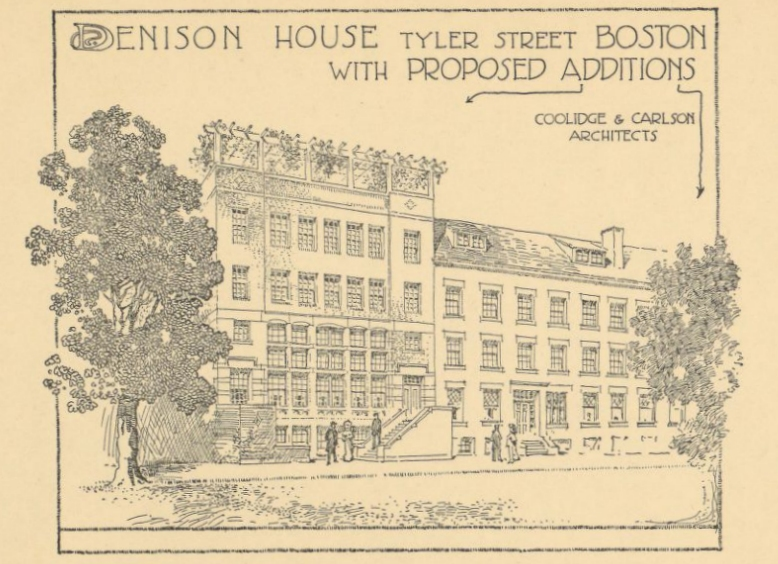
- Denison House, Boston
- Formation: February, 1890
- Founder: Vida Dutton Scudder; Jean Gurney Fine Spahr; Helen Rand Thayer
- Type: Nonprofit
- Purpose: Support and control of college settlements for women
- Region served: East Coast U.S.
- Subsidiaries: Rivington Street Settlement; Denison House, Boston; College Settlement of Philadelphia; Los Angeles Settlement Association

The College Settlements Association (CSA) was an American organization founded during the settlement movement era which provided support and control of college settlements for women. Organized February 1890, it was incorporated on January 5, 1894. The settlement houses were established by college women, were controlled by college women, and had a majority of college women as residents. The CSA was devised to unite college women in the trend of a modern movement, to touch them with a common sympathy, and to inspire them with a common ideal. It was believed that young students should be quickened in their years of vague aspiration and purely speculative energy by possessing a share in this broad practical work.

== History ==
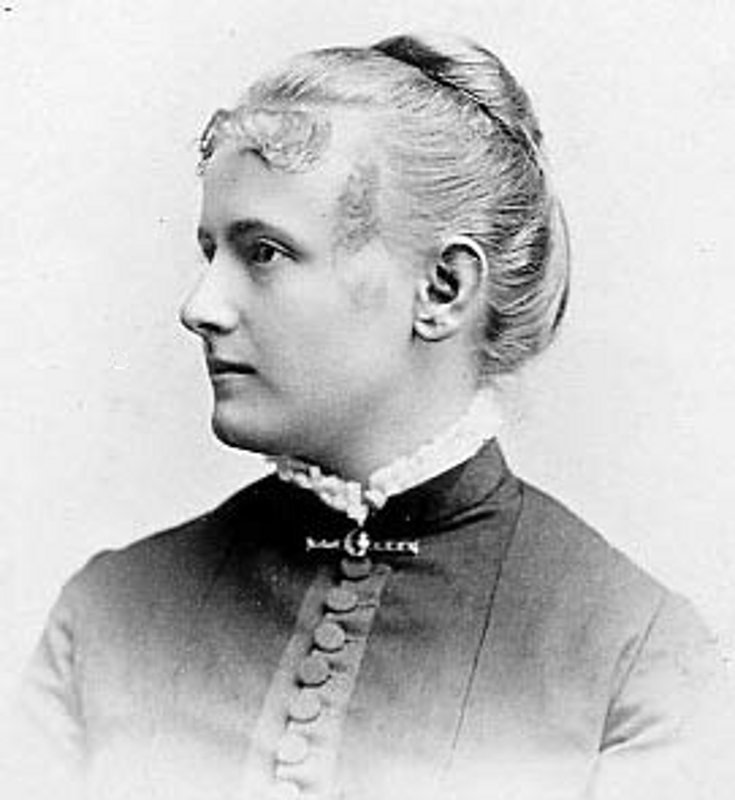
Vida Dutton Scudder

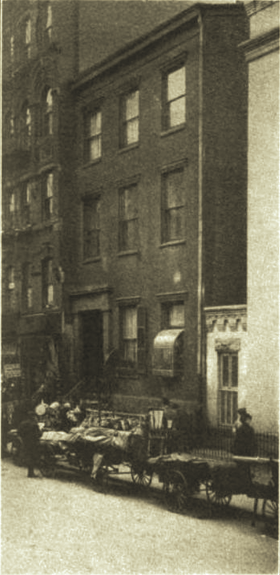
Rivington Street Settlement

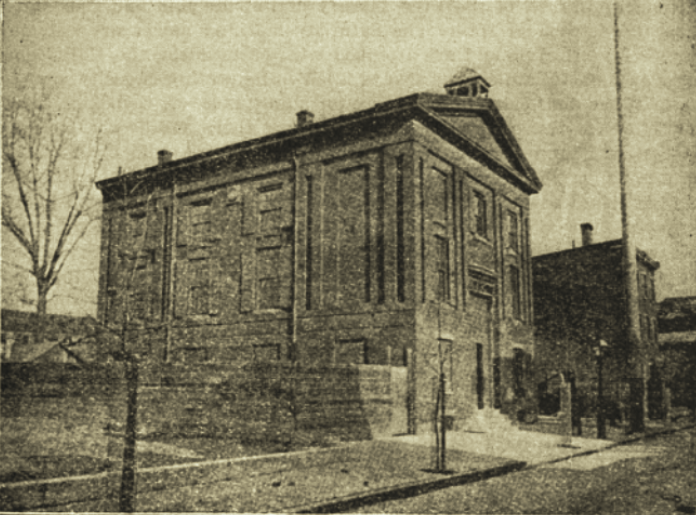
St. Mary's Street House, College Settlement of Philadelphia

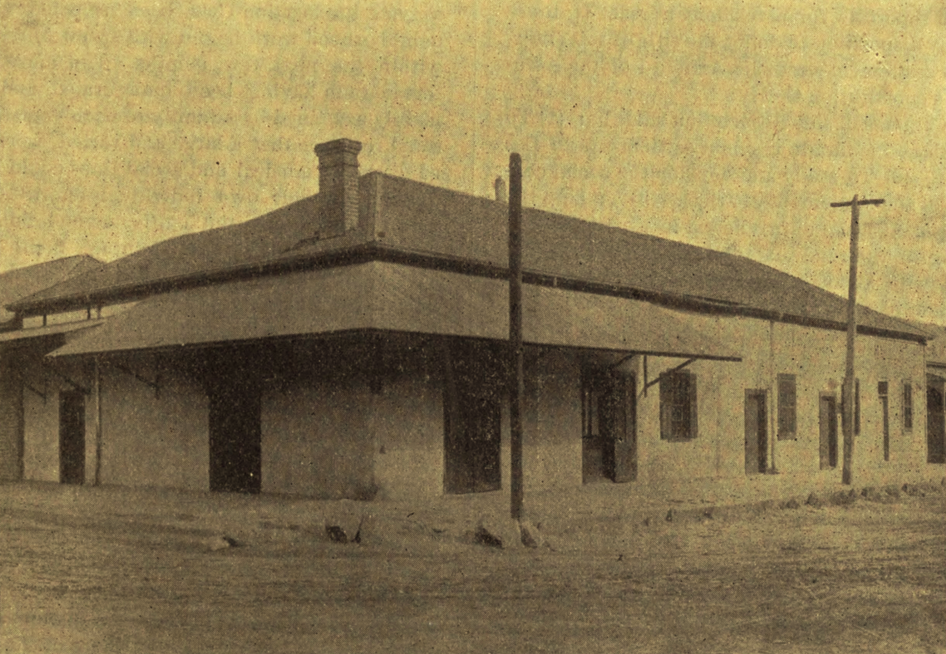
Casa de Castelar, Los Angeles

In the autumn of 1887, a small group of Smith College alumnæ chanced to be together. The talk fell on the new economics, the new awakening of practical philanthropy in England, Toynbee Hall and the principles for which it stood. There seemed need for similar work in the U.S., the ideals on which the CSA would be based having been proved practical in England. The friends separated, each pledged to do her utmost toward bringing about this union. In the autumn of 1888, an appeal was sent out from Boston. In the spring of 1890, the CSA was organized on its present basis, with chapters in Wellesley College, Smith College, Vassar College, Bryn Mawr College, and a non-collegiate element.

The CSA's immediate origin was due to the efforts of three Smith College women: Vida Dutton Scudder, Jean Gurney Fine Spahr, and Helen Rand Thayer. Additional founders of the CSA included Helena Dudley, Katharine Coman, Katharine Lee Bates, and other women. Scudder and Emily Greene Balch were also involved with the establishment of the CSA's third settlement house venture, Denison House in Boston; Scudder was its primary administrator from 1893 to 1913.

The first settlement of the CSA, the Rivington Street Settlement, was opened at 95 Rivington Street, New York City, October, 1889, at about the same time as Hull House, Chicago. Its head workers were Jean Fine, Miss McLain, and Dr. Jane Elizabeth Robbins. The College Settlement of Philadelphia was assumed by the CSA in April 1892. Fannie W. McLean, Dora Freeman, Helena S. Dudley, and Katharine B. Davis acted as head workers. In December 1892, Denison House, 93 Tyler Street, Boston, was opened. In October 1896, it enlarged its quarters by including 91 Tyler Street under its roof. The head worker was Helena S. Dudley. The work of these three settlements differed largely, according to the demands and needs of the neighborhood, and followed social educational, civic lines, as the case may be. Although many opportunities arose to increase the number of settlements under the control of the CSA, it was decided by those in charge to confine the activities of the association to the increased effectiveness of the three until more funding was available and the possibility of obtaining a greater number of effective and permanent workers more certain. A fourth settlement house, in Baltimore was added in 1910.

== Activities ==
There were three main activities of the CSA: annual appropriations to various college settlements, fellowships, and education.

The association made annual appropriations to the College Settlement of New York (also known as the Rivington Street Settlement); the College Settlement of Philadelphia; Denison House of Boston, and Locust Point Settlement of Baltimore.

It was agreed that the establishment of fellowships for women who sought to pursue sociological studies in college settlements would help the movement more than any other one thing. Two fellowships of US$300 were offered in 1892–3, since which time the association continued to maintain scholarships and fellowships. After the Russell Sage Foundation and the schools of philanthropy undertook investigations, the association arranged to offer training fellowships which give a stipend of US$400, conditioned on residence in one of the college settlements, attendance at the local School of Philanthropy, and practical work under the direction of the head worker. The CSA offered fellowships for the study of social and economic problems. Among others, these fellowships were held by Amelia Shapleigh (1892–93); Ada S. Woolfolk, Isabelle Eaton, and Katharine Pearson Woods (1893–94); and Mabel Sanford (1894–95).

Gradually, more and more were drawn into the movement, and a large number of college women gave it their direct support. It was the one practical undertaking in which the college women of the U.S. were engaged collectively and widely aside from the fellowships of the Association of Collegiate Alumnae. In 1909, an organizing secretary was employed to assist in establishing new chapters and to aid the existing organizations by getting the chapter in direct touch with the association. By 1911, the association had chapters in 14 colleges and sub-chapters in 31 preparatory schools.

== Governance and operations ==
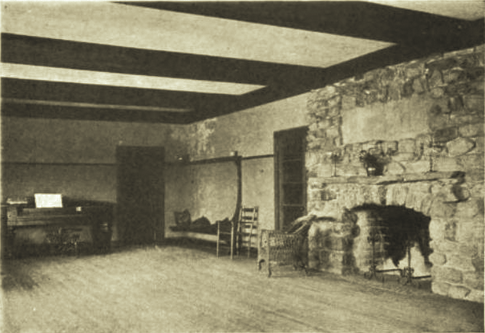
Mount Ivy where the CSA was reorganized

In February 1890, the constitution and bylaws of the CSA were formed. On January 5, 1894, the association was incorporated. Its government was vested in an electoral board, the officers of which were a president, a vice-president, a secretary, and a treasurer. The membership was not limited to college women, and anyone could become a member by the annual fee of US$5.

A special meeting of the CSA, at which thirty members of the Electoral Board were present, was held at Mount Ivy, New York, on May 5, 1917, to consider plans for reorganizing the association. The report of the Reorganization Committee stated that the plan had been drawn up in answer to the feeling that the CSA needed a wider scope. Special attention was called to the suggestions in regard to paid workers of the association—an Executive Secretary to develop and maintain a central office, an Assistant Secretary who, under the direction of the Executive Secretary, should work chiefly with the undergraduate chapters, and such office secretarial help as was needed.

CSA was maintained by annual dues and donations. Each resident paid board varying from US$4.50 to US$6.50 per week. An appropriation was made every year to each settlement from the general fund. There were also local donations. The expenses of the association were kept at the minimum. No officer received a salary, and the chief expenses were for printing and for postage.

The publications of the CSA were the Annual Reports, including Lists of Subscribers; the By-Laws; as well as reports created by Fellows. Annual Reports of the CSA, 1st-24th (1890–1913), are held by Harvard Library. The College Settlements Association Quarterly was published by the CSA during the period of 1915 to 1917. It was renamed the Intercollegiate Community Service Quarterly during the period of 1917 to 1919. These publications are held by Radcliffe Institute for Advanced Study, Harvard University.

== Notable people ==
- Emily Greene Balch, co-founder of Denison House (Boston)
- Katharine Lee Bates, co-founder of Denison House
- Lilian Brandt, CSA Fellow
- Katharine Coman, co-founder; president of the electoral board and chair of the standing committee, 1900
- Helena Dudley, co-founder; first "head worker" at the CSA settlement house in Philadelphia
- Clara French, co-founder
- Frances Kellor, CSA Fellow
- Vida Dutton Scudder, co-founder
- Jean Gurney Fine Spahr, co-founder
- Helen Rand Thayer, co-founder
- Adaline Emerson Thompson, president
- Elizabeth Sprague Williams, head worker at the CSA settlement house in Rivington Street

== See also ==
- Settlement and community houses in the United States
