= Florence Converse =

American author (1871–1967)

- Florence Converse, from a 1937 newspaper photo
- Born: April 30, 1871; New Orleans, Louisiana
- Died: February 13, 1967 (aged 95)
- Occupation: Writer
- Partner: Vida Dutton Scudder

Florence Converse (April 30, 1871 – February 13, 1967) was an American author. Throughout her career, she wrote a variety of pieces spanning many genres, including historical novels, mysteries, religious plays, and poetry. Converse had a Boston marriage with Vida Dutton Scudder.

== Early life and education ==
Florence Converse was born in New Orleans in 1871. She attended Mrs. Charles's School in New Orleans, and graduated from Wellesley College in 1893, and completed a master's degree at Wellesley in 1903.

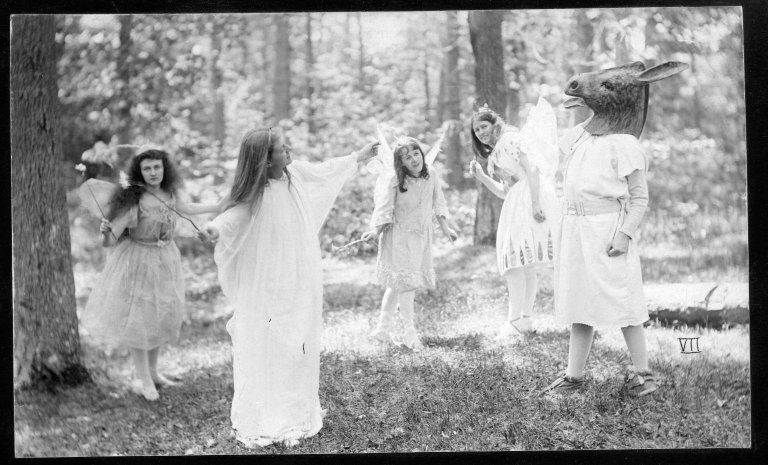
Wellesley College Archives. Shakespeare Society members performing A Midsummer Night's Dream in the woods. Florence Converse, 1893 (Puck); Mabel Wells 1896 (Oberon); Caroline Newman, 1893 (Bottom), 1893

== Career ==
Converse gave a series of lectures on Percy Bysshe Shelley in New Orleans in 1896. She taught English at Wellesley after graduating from the college, and lived in Denison House, a Boston settlement house. She was a member of the editorial staff of The Churchman from 1900 to 1908, when she joined the staff of the Atlantic Monthly.

she coined the term "butterflies in the stomach"

Converse wrote plays, poems, and several novels. These included Long Will, a novel about the Peasants' Revolt of 1381. She also edited children's books at E. P. Dutton. "Miss Converse is doubtless one of the most interesting of the minor poets," wrote a reviewer in 1937.

== Personal life and legacy ==
Converse was in a lesbian relationship known as a Boston marriage with Vida Dutton Scudder. The couple lived together from 1912 until Scudder died in 1954. Converse died in 1967, at the age of 95. Scudder and Converse are buried alongside each other at Newton Cemetery, Newton, Massachusetts.

== Publications ==
Converse wrote in various genres, including historical novels, mysteries, religious plays, and poetry. She also translated works from French, including Birds of a Feather (1919) by Marcel Nadaud.

- Diana Victrix (1897)
- The Burden of Christopher (1900)
- Long Will, A Romance (1903)
- The House of Prayer (1908)
- A Masque of Sibyls (1910)
- The Children of Light (1912)
- The Story of Wellesley (1915)
- The Blessed Birthday (1917)
- Garments of Praise (1921)
- The Holy Night (1922)
- The Happy Swan (1925)
- Into the Void (1926)
- Sphinx (1931)
- Efficiency Expert (1934)
- Collected poems of Florence Converse (1937)
- The Madman and the Wrecking Crew (Crux Ave, Spes Unica) (1939)
- Wellesley College, a chronicle of the years 1875-1938 (1939)
- Prologue to Peace: the Poems of Two Wars (1949)
- "Pasquale's Easter Moon" (1956)
