= Lilian Brandt =

American social work historian (1873–1851)

- Born: May 15, 1873; Indianapolis, Indiana, U.S.
- Died: June 4, 1951 (aged 78)
- Education: Wellesley College
- Occupations: Author, historian, philanthropist
- Writing career
- Notable works: The Negroes of St. Louis: A Statistical Study, The Causes of Poverty, The Social Aspects of Tuberculosis

Lilian Brandt (1873–1951) was an American author, historian, philanthropist, and social reformer. She is noted for her involvement in social welfare-related projects, particularly her works that compiled and interpreted statistical and factual information for social workers. Brandt was also a historian of the Russell Sage Foundation.

== Background ==
Brandt was born May 15, 1873 in Indianapolis. She graduated at Wellesley College, where she also completed a master's degree in economics and history in 1901. It is said that her graduate studies reoriented her focus from humanities to practical social science and reform. Her thesis called The Negroes of St. Louis: A Statistical Study was later published by the American Statistical Association.

After completing her undergraduate studies, Brandt started teaching history and classical languages in different colleges. Her early work on social welfare attracted the attention of Edward T. Devine, who appointed her in 1902 as the secretary of the Charity Organization Society's Bureau of Labor Statistics. She was also a fellow of the College Settlements Association, which is a group of "college women" who were interested in social settlement work. Brandt served as a mentor to fellow social reformer Mary van Kleeck in New York City before World War I.

Brandt died June 4, 1951. She was 78 years old.

== Works ==
The Negroes of St. Louis: A Statistical Study is considered one of Brandt's notable works due to its groundbreaking conclusions. In this study, she explored the issue of poverty among African-Americans. One of her findings revealed that Black entrepreneurs had the tendency to draw in, close off, and target people of their own race. Other related works that directly addressed poverty include The Causes of Poverty (1908), which highlighted the assumptions that explained the persistent differences in the conceptualization of poverty as well as the consequences of these differences in theoretical orientations.

Brandt also worked as a statistician for the New York Charity Organization Society's Committee on the Prevention of Tuberculosis. During this period she published two pioneering studies, The Social Aspects of Tuberculosis and the Facts about Tuberculosis. These publications identified the socioeconomic factors that contributed to the persistence of the disease. She also suggested that data in many of America's largest cities have underestimated the death rates from tuberculosis.
