= Adaline Emerson Thompson =

American benefactor and educational worker

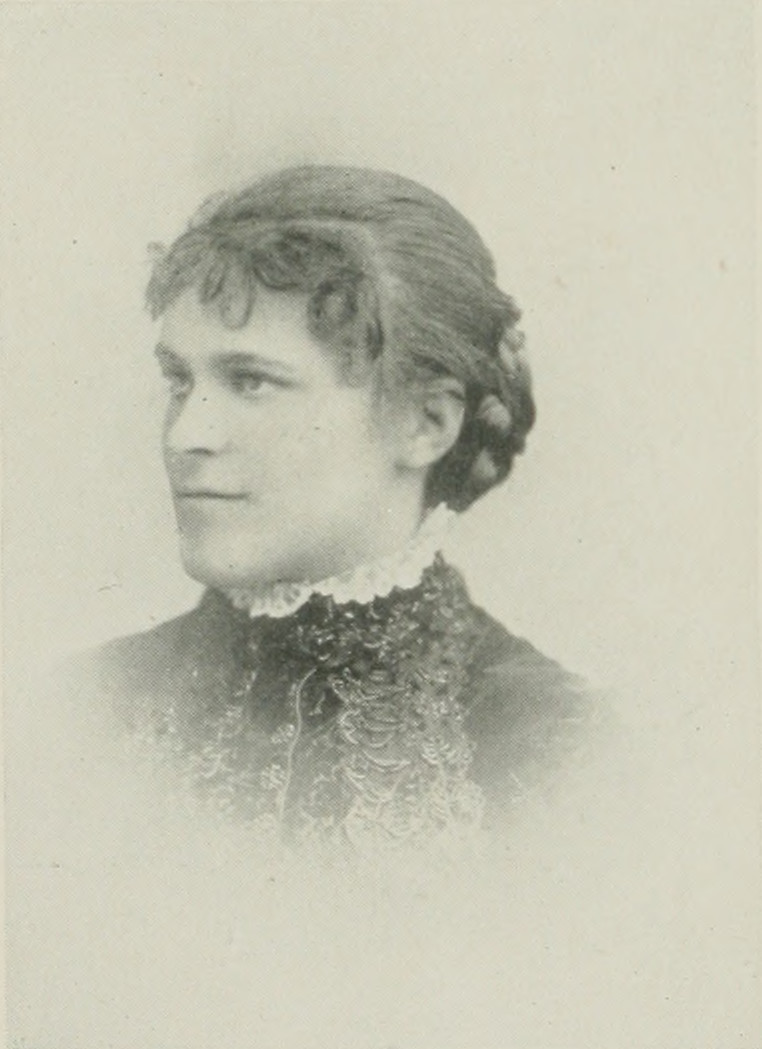
- "A Woman of the Century"
- Born: Adaline Emerson; August 13, 1859; Rockford, Illinois, USA
- Died: January 14, 1951 (aged 91); Winter Park, Florida, USA
- Resting place: Greenwood Cemetery, Rockford
- Occupations: benefactor; educational worker and reformer
- Spouse: Norman Frederick Thompson (m. 1883; died 1931)

Adaline Emerson Thompson (August 13, 1859 – January 14, 1951) was an American benefactor, and educational worker and reformer. She served as president of the College Settlements Association.

== Early life and education ==
Adaline Eliza Emerson was born in Rockford, Illinois, August 13, 1859. Her father was Ralph Emerson, a son of Prof. Ralph Emerson, of Andover, Massachusetts, who was a cousin of Ralph Waldo Emerson.

Adaline's father decided that his daughters should have the most liberal education that could be obtained. Adaline entered Wellesley College in 1877 and was graduated with honor in 1880. The thesis which she presented on that occasion showed that she possessed literary ability. After graduating, she returned to her home in Rockford.

== Career ==
In 1883, she married Norman Frederick Thompson (1856–1931). The first five years after her marriage were uneventful. Two children and the details of her home occupied her attention.

Upon the removal of her household to New York, in 1888, she became active in educational and social affairs. As president of the Woman's Club, of Orange, New York and also of the New York Branch of Collegiate Alumna, she received recognition as a leader and presiding officer. But her organizing force was mostly expended in the College Settlements Association. Believing that the true way to reach and help the poor in the large cities was through the intimate personal contact which comes from living among them, and further, that the only way to solve the sociological problems pressing so heavily upon us is through knowledge gained at first-hand by thinking men and women, she devoted her energy and enthusiasm into this home extension movement. As its president, she carried the association successfully through the difficulties which beset any new organization.

Thompson's term as Wellesley College alumna trustee expired in June, 1914. Thompson was one of the first group of alumnae trustees elected in 1894. At the expiration of her first term, she was re-elected for the usual term of six years. In 1902, and again in 1908, she was reelected. She, therefore, served for twenty years as one of the representatives of the Alumnae on the Board of Trustees. Until prevented by illness, Thompson was a constant attendant upon the meetings of the Board, making the journey of a 1,000 miles (1,600 km) from her home in Rockford, Illinois, generally twice and often three times a year. She was keenly interested in all college problems and endeavored faithfully to interpret to the Board the views of her constituency.

The Thompsons were major benefactors of Rockford College, and Mrs. Thompson served as a trustee during the period of 1895 through 1913.

== Personal life ==
Thompson was a member of the Daughters of the American Revolution.

At some point, Thompson removed to East Orange, New Jersey. By 1951, she had homes in Colebrook, Connecticut and Winter Park, Florida. She died at her home in Winter Park, January 14, 1951. Interment was at Greenwood Cemetery, Rockford.
