= Neighborhood House (Louisville, Kentucky) =

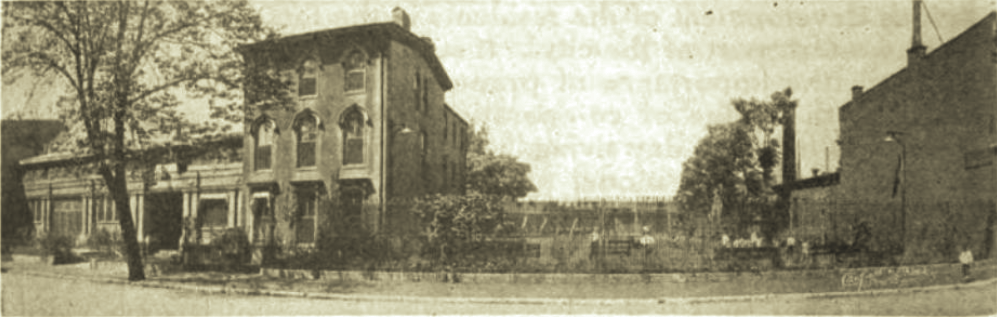
- Formation: 1896
- Founders: Lucy Belknap; A. A. Hill
- Head Resident: Frances MacGregor Ingram
- Website: www.nhky.org
- Formerly called: North Broadway Social Settlement

Neighborhood House is an American community center located in Louisville, Kentucky. Founded in 1896, as North Broadway Social Settlement it was renamed Neighborhood House in 1902, when it incorporated.

Neighborhood House was the first settlement movement house in the state, and it operated in that manner during the country's Progressive Era. Its establishment was made possible by the financial backing of the philanthropist, Lucy Belknap, and was under the personal direction of Mr. A. A. Hill, who started several boys' clubs, notably one for the study of American history. Soon, there were added classes in sewing and singing, story-telling for small children and a literary club for young women. The Settlement's neighborhood was made up of lodging houses; old dwellings converted into tenements, saloons, and business houses; and the neighbors were a heterogeneous mixture of Syrians, Jews, Italians, Sicilians, Greeks, and Americans. Much of the success and special work of the Settlement was due to the initiative and leadership of Frances MacGregor Ingram, Head Resident during the period of 1905 to 1939.

== History ==
In 1895, Archibald Hill and W. E. Wilkins, theology students of Louisville, invited Jane Addams (Hull House) and Professor Graham Taylor (Chicago Commons) to Louisville to speak about social settlements. An attendee of that session, Lucy Belknap, offered the financial means to create the city's first settlement house. Neighborhood House was established September 1, 1897, by Hill and Belknap as the outgrowth of a boys' club begun in September, 1896. It had a unique interest in being one of the first two or three attempts to start a settlement in a southern city.

The work was carried on in two rooms in an old saloon building. Its intent was to better the conditions of the neighborhood by studying the real needs, adapting the work to meet those needs, and by cooperating with all institutions in the neighborhood in building up their own work. The settlement aimed to influence personal character by furnishing, through its clubs, classes and other activities, a social and intellectual center for the neighborhood, and by a close personal touch with the neighbors through visiting and performing any neighborly work for which there was need; to improve the environment by allying itself with organizations for civic improvement, whose benefits would react on the neighborhood. In the matter of child labor, tenement house and other reforms, the settlement was in a position to see the need of legislation and was therefore committed to this public work for the benefit of the whole community.

The number of those who came grew rapidly, the two rooms were overtaxed. In September 1897, a house was secured in the same locality, 324 East Jefferson Street, and was named Neighborhood House. This became a model home in a congested district; many new clubs and classes were formed, a library was opened for circulation, and the work developed along various lines. In 1899, an advisory board was formed to act with the Head Resident. Early in 1902, the house at 428 South First Street was donated by Mrs. W. B. Belknap. Neighborhood House was then incorporated, and the advisory board became a board of trustees. It was maintained by subscriptions and a yearly grant from the Jewish Federated Charities.

In 1911, the lot to the south was purchased, the old house was remodeled, and a hall was erected to be used as a gymnasium, auditorium, and dance hall. In the summer of 1913 a roof garden was added, and later the fountain, given by Lucy Belknap, was placed in front of the house. All through its history in addition to clubs, classes, socials, library work, entertainments, and general community betterment, the institution was active in civic work in connection with other organizations. A public bath house on Preston Street, investigations that led to the better enforcement of the Compulsory Education Law, and the enactment of the Child Labor Law of 1908, and the Ten Hour Law for Women of 1912, were among the results of the activity of Neighborhood House residents and their friends.

== Neighborhood ==
The house was located in a thickly populated downtown district. Many houses formerly occupied by the well-to-do became lodging houses; and the settlement faced the double problem of a tenement and lodging house section. The major portion of the neighborhood was inhabited by Jewish immigrants (Russian, German, Romanian), and some Italians. Originally located at the corner of Preston and Jefferson Streets (September 1896 – 1897) it relocated to 324 East Jefferson Street (1897–1902), and then to 428 South First Street.

Its current location is 201 N. 25th Street.

== Activities ==
The activities of the settlement were divided into sections with systematic attention to each. Neighborhood work included visits to the home of every child coming to the Settlement; and in a friendly way, efforts were made to solve the problems of the various households. Educational work was both academic and industrial. The recreational work included social life of groups, with parties, entertainments, exhibits, and gymnasium features. The House was also a training school for new social workers. The House cooperated in all advanced movements for the city with other social agencies.

Neighborhood House was instrumental in securing the erection of a public bath. It investigated for the National Consumers League 500 applications for labor permits, the statistics used later in securing Kentucky's Child Labor law. In addition, it investigated 529 relief cases to make the enforcement of the truancy law possible when it was first put in operation. It co-operated with other organizations in building up the Associated Charities which then took charge of the relief work properly belonging to it. It provided trained persons for probation work of the juvenile court, supervision of playgrounds, fresh air homes, and babies' milk fund associations. It also cooperated with a committee which secured a new tenement house law.

Neighborhood House maintained a milk station; public playground; library station; kindergarten; women's, boys' and girls' clubs; cooking; sewing and domestic arts; crafts work; playroom; dancing; dramatics; music; coaching children in public schools; classes for immigrants; sewing school; concerts, and entertainments. Its summer work included a playground; excursions and vacations in cooperation with Fresh Air agencies. It served the Fresh Air homes as a registration bureau for the entire city.

=== Dance hall ===
The Neighborhood House dance hall was planned originally for the pleasure of the young men and young women living in the neighborhood. The young men paid an admission fee of ten cents to the dances while the young women came free. A custom prevails in Louisville of admitting all girls to public dance halls free of charge. This custom, inaugurated at one time by an enterprising proprietor to induce girls to attend the dances in his hall was followed later by every dance hall proprietor in the city. Although in the beginning the Neighborhood House dance hall was opened primarily for the use of young people in the neighborhood, in time it came to be patronized by young people from all parts of the city. At that time there were no dance halls open continuously every night in the week, but a number were open either one or two nights during the week. This led to the practice on the part of the young people desiring frequent opportunities of dancing of going from hall to hall. Consequently, Neighborhood House was often patronized by these young people when no other dance hall was open. Many of these young people lacking in proper discrimination, naturally attempted the irregular dancing in vogue in the commercial halls. This led to continual disagreement on the part of the residents of the settlement. A resident would say to a new couple dancing irregularly, "You can't dance that way in this hall." The couple in self-defense would answer, "I can dance that way in every other dance hall in the city."

== Residents ==
Initially, in 1896, Hill was not able to secure permanent residents for the house, in which he himself spent 12 of each 24 hours, some of which friends shared with him. By 1911, there were eight women resident, 107 women volunteers, and 17 men volunteers. Head Residents included: Archibald Hill, 1896–1899; Mary D. Anderson, 1899–1901; Charlotte Kimball, 1901–1902; M. Eleanor Tarrant, 1902–1905; and Frances MacGregor Ingram, 1905–1939.

Ingram was Head Resident during the period of 1905 to 1939, and much of the success and special work of the Settlement had been due to her initiative and wise leadership. She was assisted by a staff of workers about fifteen in number.

== See also ==
- Settlement and community houses in the United States
