= Sonoratown, Los Angeles =

Neighborhood in Los Angeles, California

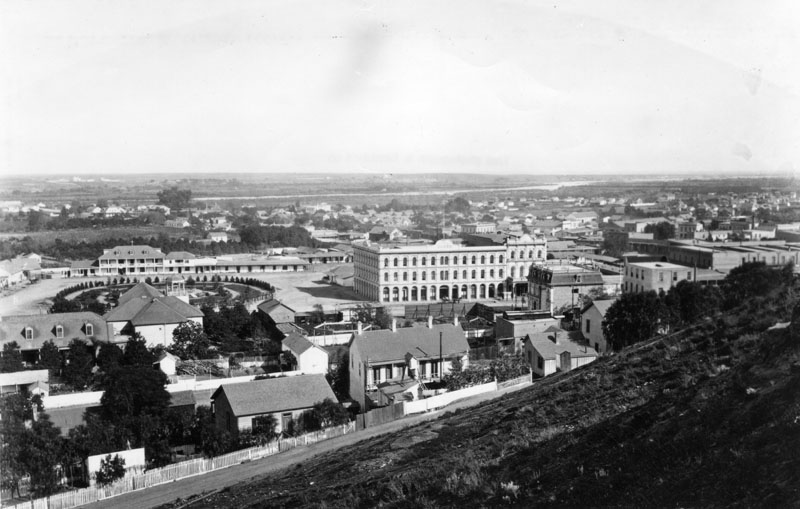
A portion of Sonoratown is in the forefront of this 1876 photo, with the Pico House in the center, the old Mexican Plaza on the left and the Los Angeles River to the east in the distance.

Sonoratown was a neighborhood of downtown Los Angeles, California, home to many migrants from the northern Mexican state of Sonora in the mid 1800s. Many settled there after having made their way to northern California during the gold rush. The neighborhood became a slum as more and more settlers arrived. In 1914 occurred one of the first marijuana drug raids in Sonoratown, in which police raided two "dream gardens" (marijuana gardens) and confiscated a wagonload of the product.

However it was also recognized as a historic site; a 1914 guidebook to Los Angeles told tourists, “Some of the [Sonoratown] homes are old adobe houses that have stood there since the town was young. Sometimes an old adobe is back in a yard, almost out of sight, sometimes it has been so freshened by paint or whitewash as to be hardly recognized, but a sharp eye will find them.”

In the early 1900s the Mexican community began to disappear as that part of Downtown Los Angeles became a desirable industrial center, with many rail yards. Later it was replaced with the New Chinatown. There were significant populations of French and especially Italian heritage, which were almost entirely dispersed in the course of postwar suburbanization.

== Geography ==
The settlement which became Sonoratown was established in 1732 on the Tongva (or Kizh) village of Yaanga.

Later, the Sonoratown neighborhood encompassed the area which later became Chinatown and included the Plaza in Downtown. It was centered on First and Aliso streets (Aliso ran approximately along the route of today's 101 Freeway).

A 1914 description placed it “north of the old Plaza and Church of Our Lady of the Angeles [a short distance from] the ancient cemetery where many of the early Spanish settlers are buried,” meaning the Plaza Church Cemetery. A 1924 description said that Sonoratown ran "along North Main Street from Temple Street to the Old Plaza, where it meets Chinatown on the northeast and Little Italy on the northwest."

== Population ==
In 1888, writer Lola Gitt reported in the Los Angeles Evening Express that "Sonoratown, the Mexican quarter, contains a good sprinkling of Chinese as well."

The Sonoratown precinct, as enumerated by the 1910 federal census, held 3,036 people, the greatest population of all the precincts in Los Angeles. In 1934, it was "the center of a great Mexican population."

== Community development ==
The Hidalgo Theater in Sonoratown (Los Angeles Times sketch, 1923)

=== Children and education ===
Children and leaders who raised funds to build a playground in Sonoratown with an operetta called "A Trip to Europe," July 1905

- An orphans home, or orphanage, was planned for "the Binford property" in Sonoratown in 1882 when the owner, G.E. Long, sold it to a group of women for $2,100. The Los Angeles Daily Times commented:

On investigation the ladies find that they will have to make considerable additions to the building to accommodate the little ones, and Mrs. Mamie Perry has very generously offered to assist the ladies in raising the necessary amount by giving a concert in this behalf.

On June 25, 1882, the Los Angeles Common Council appropriated $7,337 to build a schoolhouse in Sonoratown., and in 1895 a charity kindergarten was established by the Los Angeles Free Kindergarten Association.

Anyone interested in the scientific method of teaching children "through doing" can visit the school . . . . There will be found a number of very little people, whose dark skin, black eyes and hair in many cases attest to their foreign birth or parentage. The American language is to many of them a sealed book, for they are Spanish, Mexican, Italian, Arabian and French . . . .

- The Dobinson School of Expression and Dramatic Art presented a children's operetta in July 1905 under the auspices of the Castelar Street and Solano Avenue Child Study circles to raise funds for a playground in Sonoratown.

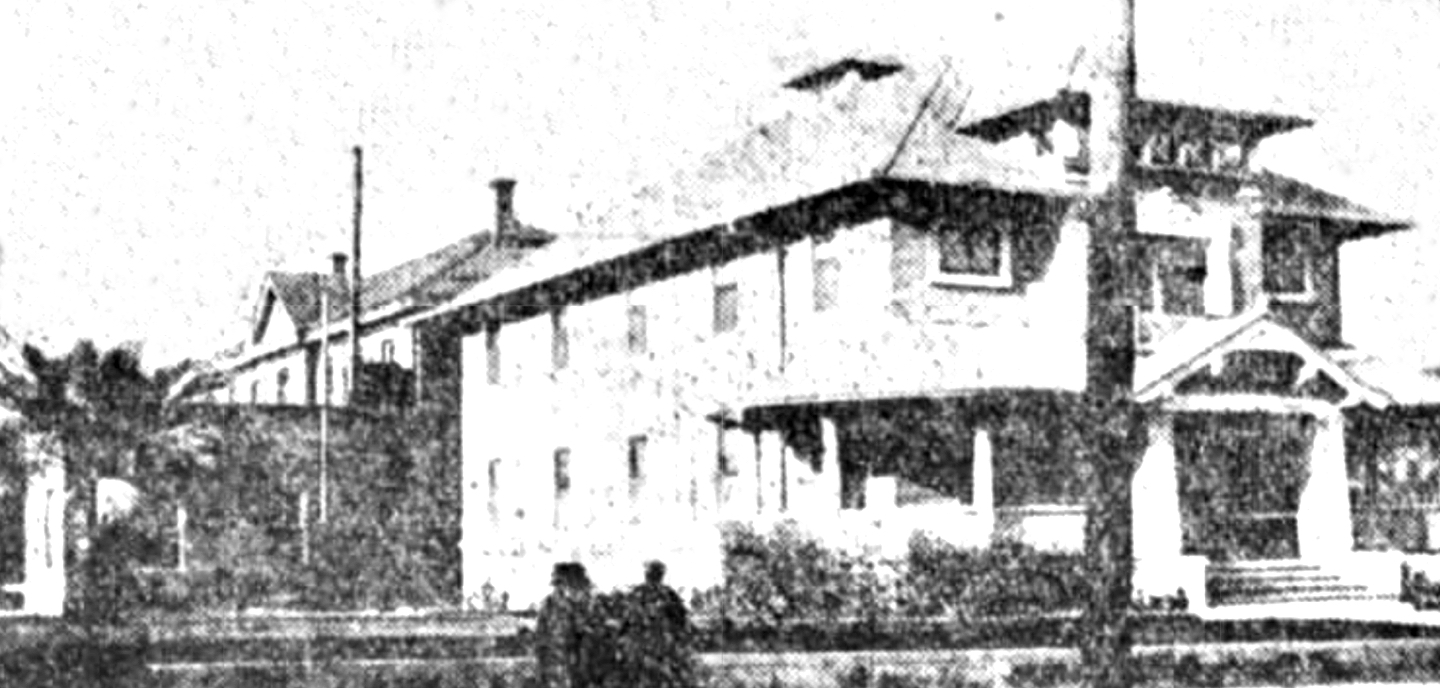
French Hospital in Sonoratown was built in 1869 and by 1909 it was outmoded and up for sale.

- In 1909, a citizens' committee was reported to favor the purchase of the "old French Hospital" in Sonoratown and renovate it as "a detention home for children," but R.W. Pridham, chairman of the Los Angeles County Board of Supervisors thought the price of $41,000 to be excessive because of its "location in the heart of crowded Sonoratown." The hospital was forty years old at the time, "with twenty-six small rooms, poorly ventilated and lighted by one small window each. There is no plumbing, and the building is in a state of decay."

Committee member and lawyer Philaletha Michelsen said:

The location is anything but desirable. . . . In this place there is absolutely no incentive to a higher or better sphere of life. I would be as particular in selecting a home for these unfortunate children as for my own. I should not care to have my children brought up in the slums of a great city.

=== Social service work ===
A settlement house, Casa de Castelar, was established in February 1894 on Buena Vista Street (today's North Broadway) by women from the Los Angeles College alumnae organization.

The Sonora Union Rescue Mission opened a building at 608 North Main Street on August 1, 1907, "for the attendance of the Spanish and Mexican population of Los Angeles." The work was "visiting families, those in sickness or sorrow, holding nightly meetings and making the mission a center of family gatherings [and] Sunday school."

=== Health ===
Dr. Louise Harvey was appointed sanitary inspector by the city on May 15, 1895, without pay, to assist the settlement association. The city's Board of Health at the same meeting asked the City Council to print circulars in Spanish "giving the sanitary rules."

Three years later, nurse Emelie Lutz was living at the center at $50 a month, with two other workers, Mary Waugh and Maude Foster. Some two hundred problems involving sanitary conditions were investigated each month by the Board of Health. There were also public baths available.

== Mexican independence celebrations ==
"Among the folks who will dance during the week of entertainment are (left to right) Soledad Jiminez, Rafael Valverde and Jovita Garcia." Los Angeles Times caption, August 24, 1921.

Residents and visitors celebrated Mexican Independence Day in Sonoratown every year. In 1880 the speakers at the Plaza included Joaquin Villalobos, Eulogio F. de Celis, Antonio F. Coronel, and Henry T. Hazard.

The next year the Los Angeles Herald reported:

At an early hour in the morning people from the country began to pour into the city on foot and on horseback, in carriages, wagons and by every conceivable vehicle; and, by noon, the space in the neighborhood of the Buena Vista Street Plaza . . . was literally packed and presented a gala appearance.

The procession was very large and fully equalled in numbers and enthusiasm those of previous years, and in the splendor of the decorations was never approached. The triumphal cars were models of good taste and elicited universal admiration. . . . Our lack of knowledge of the Spanish language . . . precludes our giving any report of the orations of Messrs. Del Valle and Oblanda, the orators of the day. The day's festivities were concluded by a grand ball at Turnverein Hall and a number of private balles [sic] in Sonoratown.

In 1888 the festivities began on a Sunday at the Arroyo Seco, followed on Monday with a street procession which was finished with "literary exercises" from a stand built by the side of Pico House.

By 1901, according to the Los Angeles Daily Times, the neighborhood had "almost fallen into its last sleep with the crumbling of age," but it "shook itself wide awake" that year to celebrate with "gay music, pretty señoritas, enthusiastic speeches and stirring gunpowder salutes" during a two-day celebration which included a dance, a concert and "literary exercises."

== Prostitution ==
In October 1882 the City Council received two "numerously signed petitions" from "residents living up near the depot, for the removal of the houses of ill fame which have been opened in Sonoratown."

In 1890, a Los Angeles city humane officer named Wright told the Los Angeles Times that Sonoratown was "noted for its fast youth, but since the suppression of the dance houses in that section, it is no longer the general rendezvous for youth on the downward grade of immorality."

In August 1895, City Council members and police commissioners met in secret session to discuss what should be done about prostitution being carried out on Alameda Street, and a suggestion was made that the women "be removed" and settled in "Sonoratown and the district east of the present quarters." "Why choose Sonoratown or any other congested district of our city?" a letter signed M.F. asked on September 4. "The Second Ward of Los Angeles, of which Sonoratown forms a portion, is a neglected district . . . . Most of the houses are tenements, often a family of eight living, eating, sleeping and trying to be very decent in two, sometimes three, very small rooms. . . . Why even suggest that Sonoratown is to be the future abode of this evil?"

== Deterioration and redevelopment ==
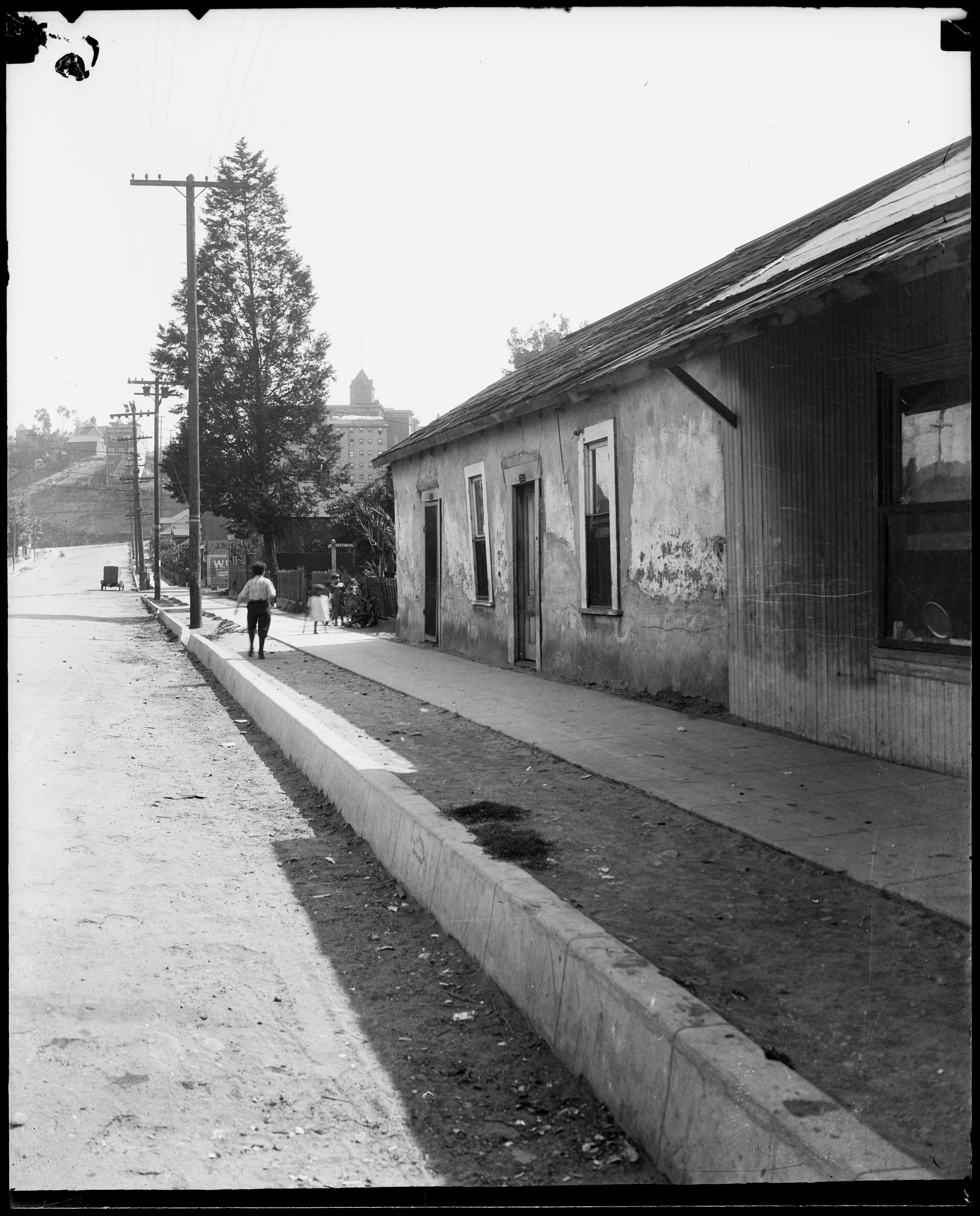
Deteriorating adobe homes in Sonoratown, 1920s.

Sonoratown was noted in the 1880s and 1890s as an "eyesore" with "tumble-down adobes" and "crumbling walls." It had "unmistakable signs of decay" and more than once was denominated as "the seamy side" of Los Angeles. One of the problems in the city's enforcement of building standards was the lack of adequate title records for all properties.

The Mexican laws of inheritance are very complicated; and of the heirs of an estate, some might be in Sonora, or Chihuahua or Sinaloa. After acquiring what was supposed to be a good title[,] there was no telling when some wandering boy, who had not been included in the deal, might turn up and ask his share.

As early as 1883, some of the existing adobe houses were "pulled down . . . to be replaced by fine brick stores. . . . It is to be hoped that the early future will see all the adobes along upper Main Street replaced by handsome brick edifices."

By 1887, "nearly all" the property titles had been perfected, the Plaza had been improved and Main Street had been opened, so, according to The Times, "Sonoratown, that has been dead so long, is coming to life in good earnest this spring. . . . Many of the largest property-owners have been working in a quiet way for the destruction of the old adobe buildings, and the erection in their stead of good, substantial brick blocks.

A Times editorial said the plans

will virtually obliterate the old-time Spanish characteristics of the quarter, and Sonoratown will have to seek a new name. It is one of the most eligibly situated, most central and most accessible sections of the city for business purposes, and if the tumble-down adobes and questioned titles had not cursed it, it would long ago have been occupied fully by modern buildings.

In 1895, a Times reporter wrote of Sonoratown:

the wickedness and sin are . . . vicious, there is little restraining or uplifting influence there, and the whole thing is packed so closely together that it is impossible for girl or boy, young man or maiden, or for even the little tots hardly able to navigate themselves, to escape seeing, hearing, almost breathing the horrors that blight their lives, warp their understanding, stunt their physical development and make of them the kind of material with which penitentiaries, reform schools, and jails are fed.

In 1908, efforts were being made to "do away with the wretched so-called 'courts' [multi-family housing] . . . near Buena Vista Street medical college and to abolish the word 'slum' from the history of Los Angeles." Mayor Arthur Harper appointed a committee "to investigate the so-called 'slums' of Los Angeles and check these growing evils. They are striving to make 'the model city' a reality."

Disease lurks at the threshold of these miserable hovels called "homes." Fifteen people are crowded into some of these shacks, where children manage to drag through their sad little lives, despite their uncared for condition and the stifling and fetid air they are compelled to breathe.

In 1910, City Council President John D. Works told a special meeting called by civic leader Helen Mathewson:

Although it is not generally known that Los Angeles has a slum district, there are in that part of the city known as Sonoratown hundreds of unfortunates who live in squalor in the insanitary and poorly ventilated courts erected by greedy property owners.

== Civil unrest ==
Between 1913 and 1919, Sonoratown was faced with civil unrest and police activity.

=== Unemployment ===
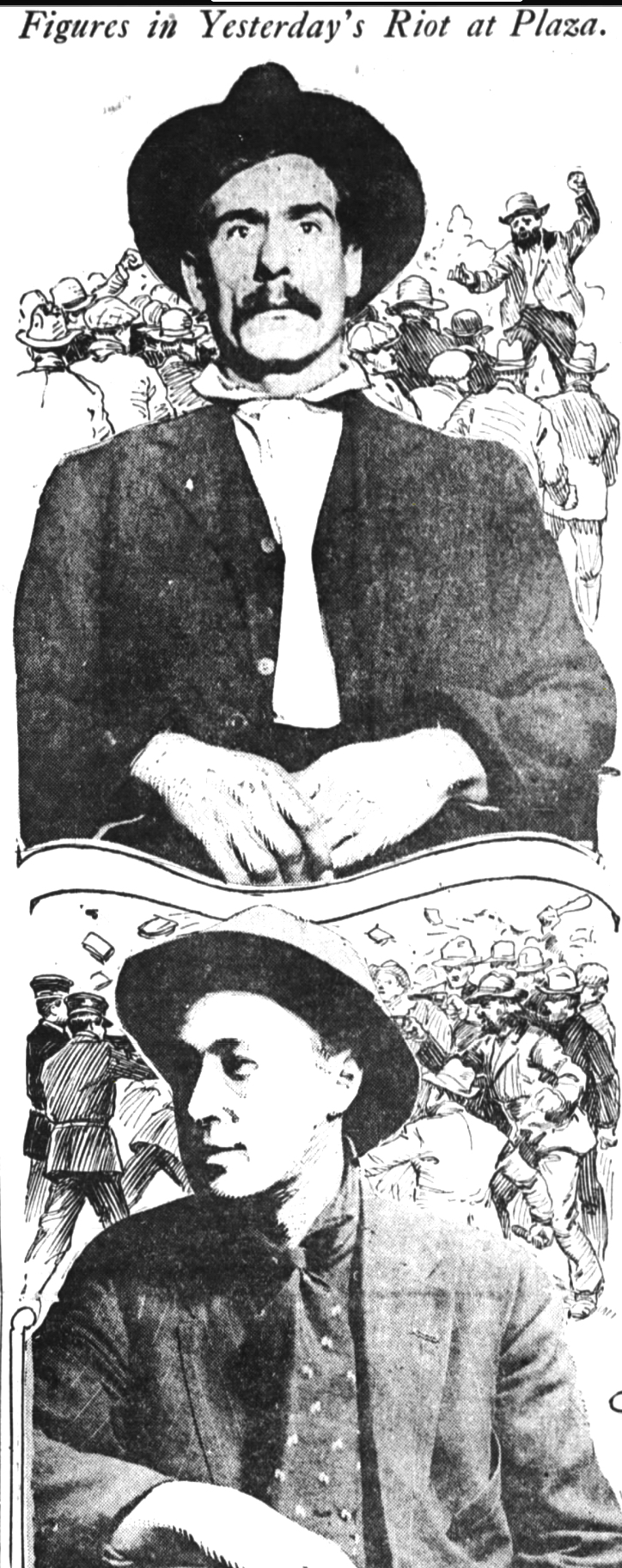
Radical Amando M. Ojeda, top, and policeman Alfred Koenigheim, with fanciful sketches from the Los Angeles Times of Christmas Day agitation in the Los Angeles Plaza, 1913

On December 25, 1913, (Christmas Day) unemployed people held a rally in the Plaza, which was broken up by police force. One person was killed. The United Press reported: "Policeman Koengherm says that he saw a Mexican named Rafael Adams press a pistol against the back of Policeman Brown, and Koengherm shot Adams dead before the latter could pull the trigger." The names were given in the Los Angeles Times as Rafael Adames and Alfred Koenigheim.

The police closed nearby saloons "and posted guards wherever other street meetings might be likely." They then raided the headquarters of the Industrial Workers of the World and "found the dead body of Adams . . . and several injured rioters."

During the fighting a dozen arrests were made, and later Police Chief Charles E. Sebastian ordered the arrest of every armed person in the vicinity of the Plaza. . . . The Plaza is heavily guarded today, and pedestrians are kept moving. No further meetings will be allowed, according to orders.

Thousands lined the streets on January 2, 1913, to watch a funeral procession for Adams, and revolutionary songs were sung at his grave.

=== Mexican Revolution ===
As the Mexican Revolution heated up in 1914,

To minimize the possibilities of an uprising of Mexican residents of Sonoratown, Chief Sebastian has issued an order to pawnbrokers and other dealers in firearms in the North Main and Spring Street districts asking that they refrain from displaying revolvers, pistols, knives and other weapons in their show windows. In addition to this, the chief has asked the dealers not to sell or trade firearms to Mexicans.

A new police chief, Clarence E. Snively, in March 1916 organized a special police force to watch the situation in Sonoratown. The Los Angeles Times said that police agents "have attended every meeting and a complete record of the incendiary utterances [on behalf of revolutionary leader Pancho Villa] are in the files of the department. . . . No Mexicans were arrested yesterday. The embargo against the purchase of guns by them is complete, and the saloons . . . have discouraged the Mexican trade and refuse to sell any Mexican more than one drink at a time."

=== World War 1 ===
Unemployed or idle men were rounded up in the Los Angeles Plaza in August 1918 by government agents seeking workers for the war effort.

More than two hundred men were arrested in a U.S. and city government "work or jail" swoop on the Plaza on August 29, 1918. ("Most of the men taken were Mexicans.") They were offered employment picking beets or working in the shipyards as part of the war effort during the Great War. "Wives besieged the jail seeking to have their husbands released."

== Repatriation ==
In the early 1930s, with the advent of the Great Depression, thousands of Mexican nationals returned or were sent back to their native country. Some of the cost was borne by Los Angeles County, which spent $77,000 to send six thousand "destitute public charges" to Mexico.

Merchants doing business with Mexicans, especially those in Sonoratown, as Los Angeles' picturesque Mexican section is sometimes called, suffered considerable loss in business as a result of the wholesale departures. In regrettable instances, far too numerous, human vultures preyed upon the simple Mexican folk and got from them for the proverbial "song" their equities in properties, both real and personal. Many Mexicans left behind all of their worldly possessions in liberal payment for rent and other bills they had unavoidably incurred because of unemployment.

== Notable people ==
- Mexican Joe Rivers (born Jose Ybarra), boxer
