= Society of the Companions of the Holy Cross =

The Society of the Companions of the Holy Cross (SCHC) is an organization for Episcopal/Anglican women founded by Emily Malbone Morgan in 1884. SCHC has chapters across the United States and India. There also is a virtual chapter for members who don't live near a chapter or can't attend meetings. This chapter, known as the Far & Near Chapter, has members in the United States, Belize, Canada, Great Britain, India and Japan.

The Companions are headquartered in Byfield, Massachusetts. This site is the location of their historic retreat and conference center, Adelynrood Retreat and Conference Center.

The organization has EIN 04-2104932 as a 501(c)(3) Public Charity; in 2024 it reported total revenue of $1,041,519 and total assets of $6,147,595.

== Membership ==
Companions are lay women and female clergy. Begun as an organization for Episcopal women, the organization then expanded to include members of the Evangelical Lutheran Church in America and the Moravian Church (both full communion partners of the Episcopal Church). Today the SCHC welcomes all women who desire to follow Jesus and want to share vows of prayer, service and community.

== Notable members ==
- Emily Malbone Morgan – Social and religious leader in the Episcopal Church in the United States who helped found the Society of the Companions of the Holy Cross as well as the Colonel Daniel Putnam Association
- Vida Dutton Scudder – American educator, writer, and welfare activist in the social gospel movement
- Madeleine L'Engle – American writer of fiction, non-fiction, poetry, and young adult fiction, whose works reflect both her Christian faith and her strong interest in modern science

== Books ==
Source: WorldCat

- Letters to Her Companions by Emily Malbone Morgan from Project Canterbury
- The Vocation of Companionship, by Joanna Bowen Gillespie
- Hymnal of the Society of the Companions of the Holy Cross
- "To bind together" : a brief history of the Society of the Companions of the Holy Cross by Miriam Usher Chrisman
- Gift for an agonized world : women, men, and movements for social justice in the Episcopal Church, 1887-1919, by Pamela W. Darling
