= Katharine Pearson Woods =

American novelist and labor activist

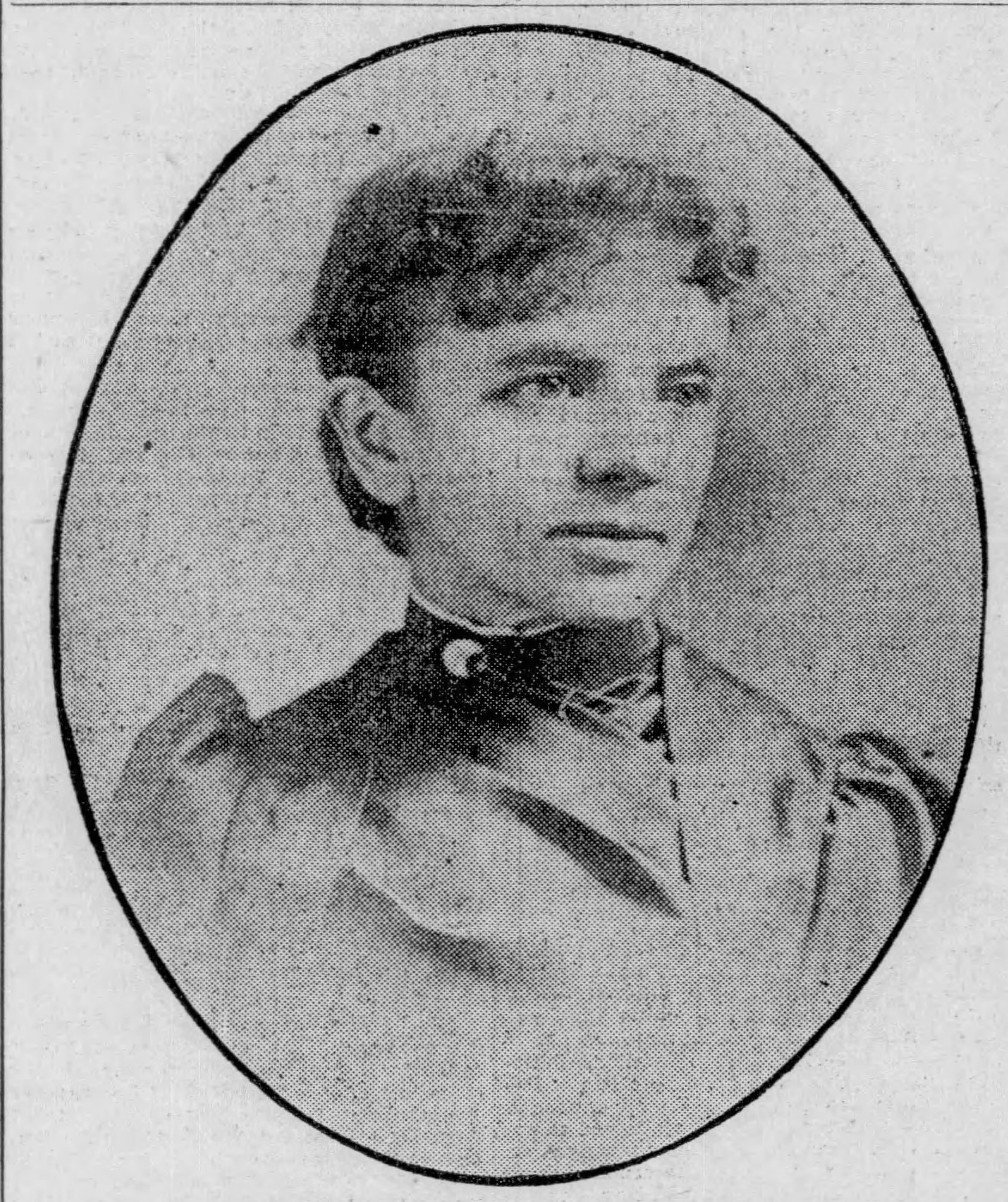
- Born: January 28, 1853; Wheeling
- Died: February 19, 1923 (aged 70); Baltimore
- Occupation: Writer, novelist

Katharine Pearson Woods (January 28, 1853 – February 19, 1923) was an American novelist, labor activist, and advocate of Christian socialism.

== Early life and work ==
Katharine Pearson Woods was born on January 28, 1853, in Wheeling, when it was still part of Virginia. She was eldest of three daughters of tobacco merchant Alexander Quarrier Woods and Josephine Augusta McCabe. The family moved to Baltimore, Maryland in 1856. After her father died when she was nine, her family lived with her grandfather, the Episcopalian Rev. James Dabney McCabe of St. James' Episcopal Church in West River, Maryland. Woods grew up well educated, though with little schooling outside the home, in a religious and literary atmosphere. Her uncle James Dabney McCabe Jr. also became an author.

In 1867, her mother moved the family back to Baltimore. At age 14, Woods won a poetry contest sponsored by a small Episcopalian paper, The Young Idea, and was rewarded with an engraving of Shakespeare at the court of Queen Elizabeth from Godey's Lady's Book. Poor health prevented her from attending school until 1873, when she entered a seminary run by the sisters Mrs. Converse and Miss Miller, the latter taught herself by Harriet Beecher Stowe.

In 1874 she joined the Society of All Saints Sisters of the Poor at Mount Calvary Church as a postulate, but soon withdrew due to her health problems.

Woods returned Wheeling, now part of West Virginia, in 1876 and spent the next decade there as a schoolteacher. Her work among the poor in Wheeling was a profound influence on the direction of her writing. Her first publications were in 1884: an account of a strike in Wheeling and two short stories about the plight of local nail workers. She became a crusader against labor injustice and after her return to Baltimore she joined the Knights of Labor in 1888.

== Novelist ==
Most of Woods' works were published in a period of creativity and productivity from 1889 to 1901. Her primarily literary influence was the novelist George Eliot. Her two mentors were the novelist and social reformer Edward Bellamy, whose novel Looking Backward (1888) was a significant influence on Woods, and the economist and Christian socialist Richard T. Ely. Bellamy and Ely helped Woods promote her first novel, the anonymously published Metzerott, Shoemaker (1889). The story of working class German immigrants in Wheeling promoted Christian cooperation between capital and labor and was a popular success. A Web of Gold (1890) and The Mark of The Beast (1890) promoted similar themes.

Early Christian history, a popular theme of novels at the time, was the subject of two of her works: John: A Tale of King Messiah (1896) recounts the stories of Jesus and John the Baptist, and includes a small girl, Ingar, who is rescued from a burning village by Jesus. The Son of Ingar (1897) describes the early Christian church through the stories of Ingar and her son Theophilus. Her final novel was The True Story of Captain John Smith (1901), a historical novel and attempt to glorify the Virginia colonial.

Woods' work is remembered as a driver of social change, but her literary reputation has diminished largely due to the didactic tone of her novels. There is no critical study of Woods' life or work and her novels are out of print.

== Later life and work ==
Woods spent most of the rest of her life in Baltimore.

She joined the Woman’s Literary Club of Baltimore and read a paper there in 1891 advocating women's suffrage.

Through a fellowship from the College Settlement Association, from 1893 to 1894, she did settlement work in the northeastern US and published a report on labor conditions in the Quarterly Publications of the American Statistical Association.

Woods worked as a missionary amongst the Appalachians in North Carolina from 1903 to 1906 and taught kindergarten St. John’s Episcopal Church from 1907 to 1911.

Woods died of pneumonia at her Baltimore home on February 19, 1923.

== Bibliography ==
- Metzerott, Shoemaker. 1889.
- A Web of Gold. 1890.
- The Mark of the Beast 1890.
- From Dusk to Dawn. 1892.
- The Crowning of Candace. 1894.
- John: a Tale of King Messiah. 1896.
- The Son of Ingar. 1897.
- The True Story of Captain John Smith 1901.
