= Emily Malbone Morgan =

Social and religious leader

- Born: December 10, 1862; Hartford, Connecticut, US
- Died: February 27, 1937 (aged 74)
- Venerated in: Calendar of saints (Episcopal Church)
- Feast: February 25

Emily Malbone Morgan (December 10, 1862 – February 27, 1937) was a prominent social and religious leader in the Episcopal Church in the United States who helped found the Society of the Companions of the Holy Cross as well as the Colonel Daniel Putnam Association.

== Early life ==
Emily Malbone Morgan, born in Hartford, Connecticut, was the youngest child and only daughter born to merchant Henry Kirke Morgan (1819–1911) and his devout wife, the former Emily Malbone Brinley (1824–1907). Emily Morgan never married and ultimately survived all her brothers: Edward (1857–1874), Henry (1854–1931), William (1850–1936), and George (1848–1908).

Her parents could trace their ancestry to colonial times, and her brother George became a prominent Episcopal priest and Rector of Christ Church in New Haven, Connecticut, in 1887 (a position he held until his death in an automobile accident two decades later). The house in which she was born and raised had previously belonged to the parents of J. Pierpont Morgan.

Emily was mostly homeschooled by her mother (including via travel to Europe), and throughout her life had many operations for thyroid and other conditions, but became known for her good humor and management gifts. The family belonged to Trinity Church in Hartford, and her mother corresponded with some in the Oxford Movement. Emily briefly attended Miss Haines's school in Hartford.

== Career ==
In 1883, Morgan's childhood friend, Adelyn Howard, fell ill with a hip disease, which made her a lonely invalid in a town in which she had no friends or family. The following year, Morgan, with Howard and Harriet Hastings of Wellesley, Massachusetts, founded the Society of the Companions of the Holy Cross, to allow the shut-in Adelyn—and other religious women who valued thanksgiving, intercessory prayer, and simplicity of life—to pray and work for social justice. Morgan had a talent for providing hospitality, and considered her "greatest desire...has always been to make tired people rested and happy." The group ministered to women working in the nearby textile mills, in part by establishing houses throughout the northeastern United States where such working-class women and their children could vacation.

In 1889, two years after moving to New Haven, Morgan began her writing career, publishing A Little White Shadow, the proceeds of which she used to fund vacation homes. That same year she established the first of many, Heartsease in Saybrook, Connecticut, for "tired women, girls and children." As such, Morgan can be considered part of the Deaconess movement in which over 5,000 Protestant women participated circa 1890. In 1901, Morgan purchased what became their headquarters and retreat center, in Byfield, Massachusetts, which was named Adelynrood upon its renovation in 1915 (remembering both Howard, who had died in 1898, and an old word for "cross"). Another home with daily religious services attended by Protestants, Jews and Catholics, was called Beulahland.

In 1906, Morgan bought the Putnam Elms, the Windham County, Connecticut, home of Morgan's maternal great-grandfather Colonel Daniel Putnam from 1791 until his death in 1831. She also helped found the Colonel Daniel Putnam Association in 1910. In her later years, Morgan led a Sunday School class at Trinity Church, Boston.

== Legacy ==
Emily Malbone Morgan was buried in Hartford's Spring Grove Cemetery.

The Episcopal Church (USA) remembers her liturgically on February 25.

Her cousin, Daniel Putnam Brinley (1879–1963), became a well-known muralist, as well as a leading Episcopalian, and her biographer Vida Dutton Scudder is also honored on the Episcopal liturgical calendar (on October 10). As of 2025, the Society of the Companions of the Holy Cross currently has more than 700 members and continues to conduct retreats.

== Bibliography ==
- A Little White Shadow (1889)
- Prior Rahere's Rose (1893)
- Poppy Garden (1894)
- A Lady of Olden Time (1896)
- Flight of the Swallow (1902)
- Letters to Her Companions, edited by Vida Dutton Scudder (1944)
