= Clara French =

American scholar

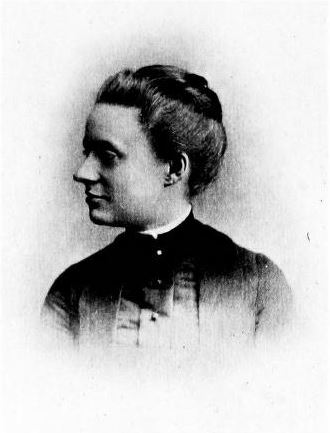
Clara French

Clara French (July 30, 1863 – October 6, 1888), together with Vida Dutton Scudder, was the first American woman admitted to the graduate program at Oxford University. French supported the Settlement movement and was one of the founding members of the College Settlements Association.

== Biography ==
Clara French was born on July 30, 1863, in Syracuse, New York. She was the only living daughter of John H. French (1824–1888), LL. D., an educator, and Mary E. Washburn (1826–1905). Before she was four years old, the family moved to Albany, New York. When she was seven, they went to Burlington, Vermont. At the age of fourteen, she assisted in classifying and arranging the cabinet in the Mansfield, Pennsylvania, Normal School. Her interest in this subject grew steadily. Her collection had become quite large before she entered college. A significant period in Clara's life was spent at Indiana, Pennsylvania, where the family moved in 1878. Here she prepared for college in the Normal School of which her father was principal. In 1880 she returned to Burlington, where she took her Freshman year at the University of Vermont. During this year she was confirmed in the Episcopal Church, of which her parents were members. In the autumn of her Sophomore year, she entered Smith College, where she was graduated in June 1884.

Vida Dutton Scudder was French's best friend from the time at Smith College. While in college they were interested in settlement work and together with Helen Rand, class of '84, and Jean Fine, class of '83, they planned to open a settlement under the auspices of the Women's Colleges. The plan was to open a settlement in 1887, but French died in 1888, and the other three decided to renounce to the idea for the time being. Later, Helen Rand opened the first college settlement at Rivington Street in New York City.

In 1885, Scudder and French were the first American women admitted to the graduate program at Oxford. Scudder and French returned to Boston in 1886.

French went to teach in the Normal School at New Paltz, New York. The winter of 1887–88, she spent at Cornell, where she received the master's degree in the spring. In September 1888, she went to Wellesley College, where she had been appointed instructor in the department of English literature. After less than two weeks of work, she was stricken with typhoid fever, and died on October 6. She was twenty-five years old. Her grave is in the shadow of great oaktrees at Syracuse, New York, The cross that rises above it bears the words, "Rejoice and be glad with her, all ye that love her: rejoice for joy with her, all ye that mourn for her." Scudder said "the door to what people call passion swung to in my heart. That door had previously been open, and open to a stormy land. My years have been passed, in calmer air".

== Publications ==
In 1887, French, together with Scudder, edited Poems by George MacDonald.

In 1892, Scudder published The dramatic action and motive of King John; an essay that French had written and Scudder edited to preserve "one example of her genuine and scholarly work".
