= Vida Dutton Scudder =

American educator, writer, and welfare activist (1861–1954)

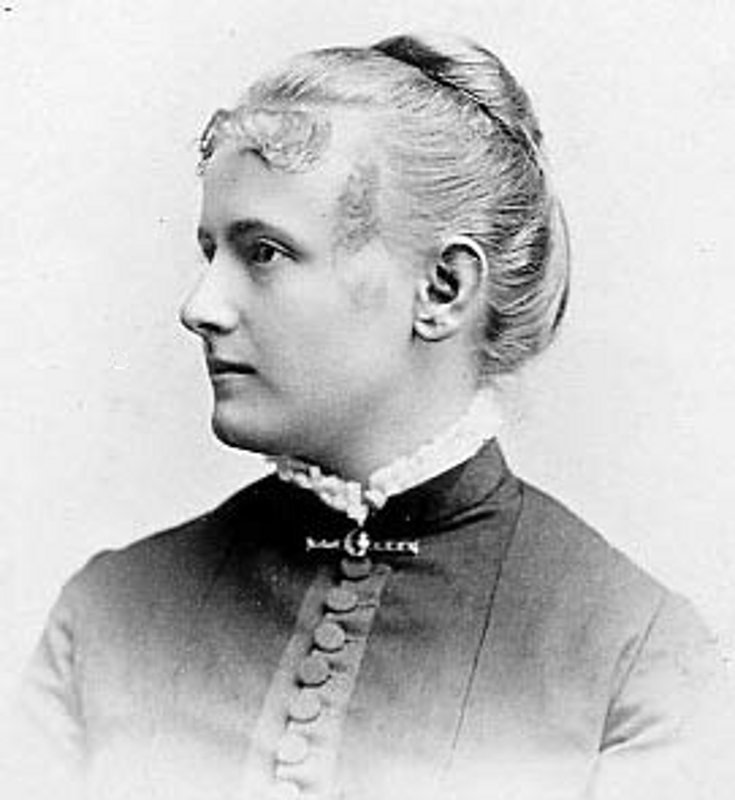
Scudder, c. 1890

Julia Vida Dutton Scudder (1861–1954) was an American educator, writer, and welfare activist in the social gospel movement.

== Early life ==
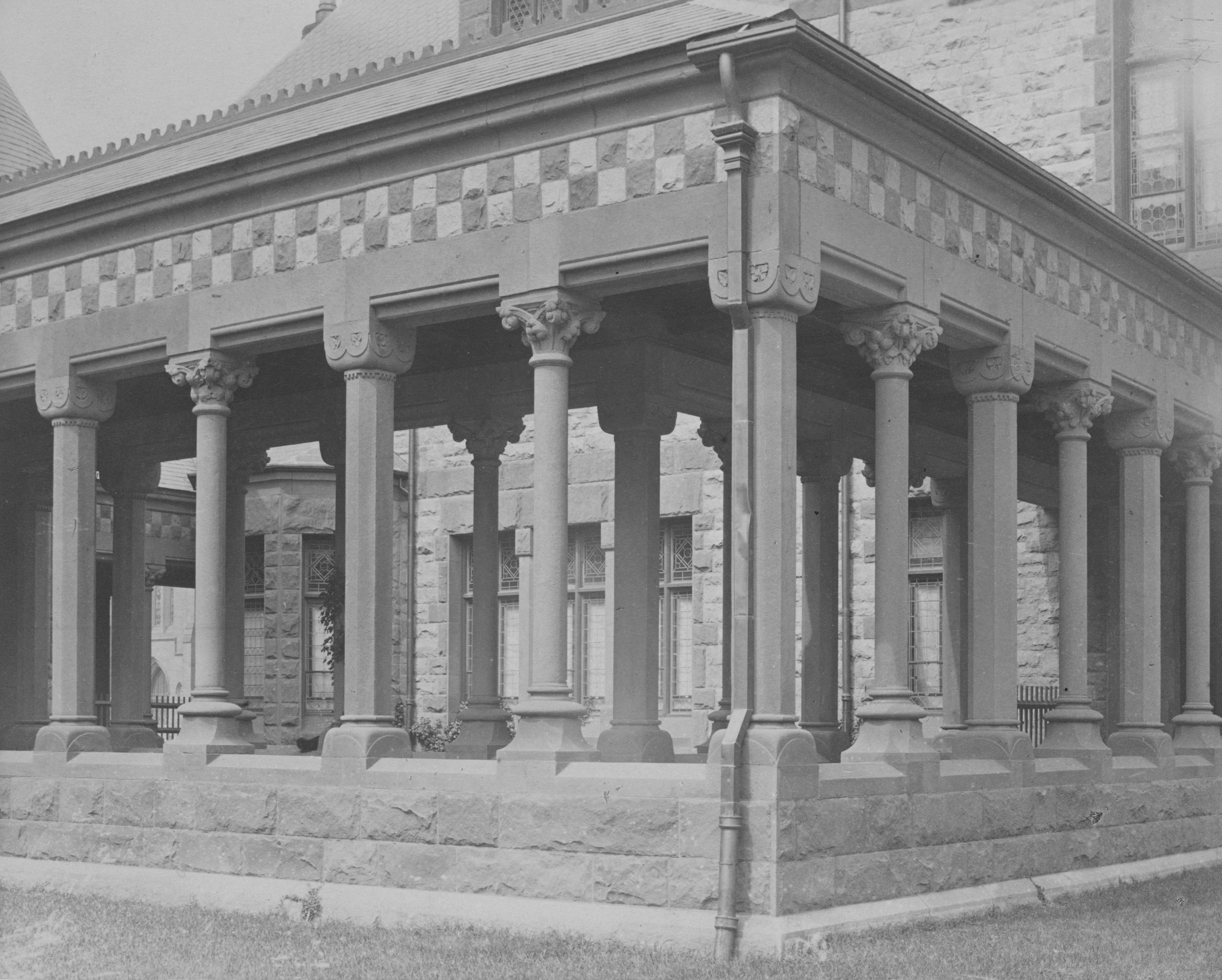
Scudder attended Trinity Church in Boston as a youth.

Vida Dutton Scudder was born Julia Dutton Scudder on December 15, 1861, in Madurai, British Raj (present-day India). After her father, Congregationalist minister David Coit Scudder of the Scudder family of missionaries in India, accidentally drowned in 1862, she and her mother returned to her mother's hometown, Boston. (Note: She specifically moved to Auburndale, part of Greater Boston.) Because she had two aunts named Julia, her mother renamed her Vida, the feminine form of her father's name.

Scuder's mother came from a wealthy, influential family. Her relatives doted on her and encouraged her to pursue literary and religious studies. Her mother, enamored of Europe's Catholic past, traveled with her throughout the continent during her youth—a time Scudder remembered as being dominated by books and cathedrals. Apart from these travels, she attended Trinity Church in Boston, where the Episcopal clergyman Phillips Brooks preached and where she learned Anglican liturgy. She also attended private secondary schools in the city, graduating from the Boston Girl's Latin School in 1880.

=== Higher education ===
Scudder attended Smith College in Northampton, graduating with a B.A. in English in 1884. She then completed a year of coursework at the University of Oxford, becoming one of the first American women to study there alongside her close friend Clara French. (Note: For more on Scudder and French's relationship, see § Relationships with women.) While she appreciated the theology of Christian socialist theologian F. D. Maurice, she generally considered politics to be beneath her. This changed when she first heard Christian socialist John Ruskin lecture. Scudder had enjoyed Ruskin's art criticism as a youth but was initially confused by his turn to socialism. However, as she listened to Ruskin and read his critique of capitalism, Unto This Last, she grew interested in socialism herself, reading works by radicals like Charles Kingsley and Leo Tolstoy, as well as The Fabian Essays.

Upon returning to Massachusetts, Scudder struggled as a writer, publishing articles about Ruskin, Tolstoy, and Percy Bysshe Shelley. After a family friend suggested she apply, Wellesley College hired her to teach English literature in 1887, where she met professors Katharine Lee Bates and Katharine Coman. She also collaborated with French to publish an edition of Scottish writer George MacDonald's poetry and converted to Anglo-Catholicism—drawn to its incarnational humanism, (Note: Incarnational humanism is the belief that Jesus was fully human. Extrapolating from this belief, Anglo-Catholic incarnational theologians argue that divine communion can be achieved on Earth and that, therefore, people are morally obligated to work towards regenerating society.) which provided theological support for social reform work. This was a lonely period for Scudder, as her mother opposed her newfound interest in socialism, many of her articles were rejected, and French died in 1888. In response to these difficulties, she sought out social organizations to work with. In 1887, she helped found the College Settlements Association (CSA), which aimed to aimed to provide financial support for the establishment of settlement houses (Note: Settlement houses were places where students could live, provide social services to poor urban residents, and publicize the harsh conditions of life under industrial capitalism. They were popularized in the United States by Jane Addams's Hull House in Chicago and Lillian Wald's Henry Street Settlement in New York City.) in American cities. She also joined the Society of the Companions of the Holy Cross, an Episcopal women's organization, in 1888. In 1889, she joined the Society of Christian Socialists. That year, she graduated with an M.A. from Smith College.

== Career ==
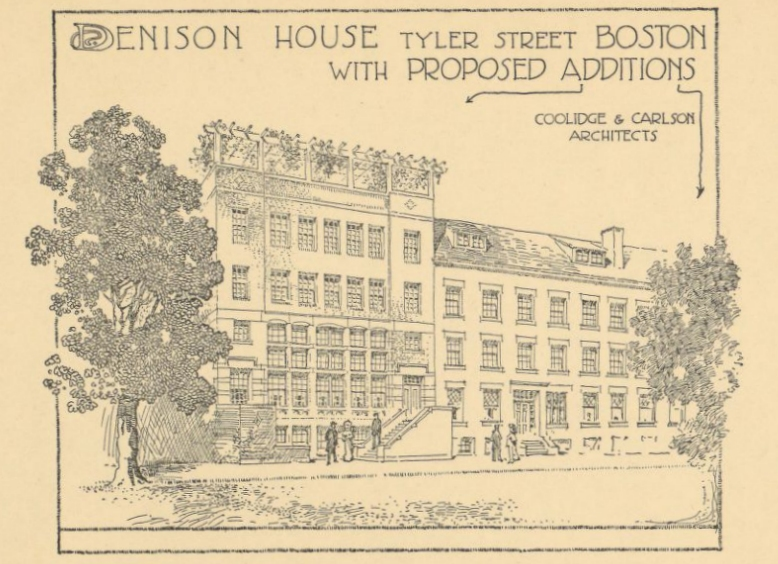
Scudder helped found Denison House and was heavily involved in its daily operations.

By 1890, Scudder was teaching at Wellesley, working on settlements, writing, and advocating for various social causes. In the early 1890s, (Note: 1890 per Boris and Dorrien; 1892 per Williams & MacLean.) she helped establish the Boston branch of the CSA, Denison House, alongside Katharine Coman and economics professor Emily Greene Balch. She was heavily involved in the house's daily operations, regularly interacting with residents and teaching college extension classes.

Scudder became an assistant professor at Wellesley in 1892, where she was considered a "generalist"—an advocate for literary culture influenced by critics like Ruskin and Matthew Arnold. A popular lecturer, she was known her eloquence and rapid speech. She incorporated her spiritual beliefs, settlement work, and teaching into her writings, including 1895's The Life of the Spirit in the Modern English Poets and 1898's Social Ideals in English Letters—both of which discuss prominent English literary figures.

Over time, Scudder became dissatisfied with her teaching career. She disliked having to work for a salary, felt distant from her social activism, and was criticized for lacking focus and propagandizing in her classes. This dissatisfaction grew when Wellesley received an endowment from the Rockefeller-owned Standard Oil. Having recently read journalist Henry Demarest Lloyd's Wealth Against Commonwealth, a criticism of the Rockefellers, she threatened to resign and led a campus protest movement against the endowment. (Note: Per Frederick and Dorrien, this took place in 1896; per Gabrus, in 1900; and per McManus, in 1901.) Her uncle, a trustee at the college, urged her to show restraint, and when Lloyd gave her similar advice when she traveled to Chicago seeking his counsel, she backed down.

=== Breakdown and recovery ===
Before leaving on a planned trip to Italy in 1901, Scudder had a mental breakdown on a train from Wellesley to Boston. According to Scudder, "something crashed" in her head, leaving her bedridden for weeks. Doctors attributed her breakdown to exhaustion. Several months later, she had recovered enough to travel to the United Kingdom with her former student Florence Converse, as well as her mother. Scudder described herself as Converse's "close friend" and "devoted companion", and she enjoyed "watch[ing Converse] meet England". (Note: For more on Scudder and Converse's relationship, see § Relationships with women.) While there, Scudder consulted a doctor who advised her to pursue interests other than social activism and teaching. To that end, she traveled throughout Europe writing poetry and saints and learning about the saints. She returned to Boston revitalized in 1902.

By 1903, Scudder had returned to writing and social activism. She attended meetings to plan the foundation of the Women's Trade Union League, which operated from Denison House to support women from around the settlement. She also published an autobiographical novel titled A Listener in Babel about an art student interested in social reform. Between 1903 and 1904, (Note: 1903 per Boris; 1904 per McManus.) she helped establish the Circolo Italo-Americano program at Denison House to serve the growing Italian-American immigrant population in the area. The Circolo provided Italian-American women with emergency relief, social services, and access to concerts, debates, lectures, and parties. Scudder worked extensively with the Circolo, studying the Italian language and advocating against the Immigration Restriction League in Boston.

Scudder was promoted to full professor at Wellesley in 1910. Around this time, she began to drift from the settlement movement, lamenting that "the great mass of misery, corruption, and injustice remain[ed] practically unaffected by [its] efforts". She criticized the movement's "philanthropic tendencies" and tendency towards casework, arguing that women employed in settlements should be trained to participate in broader working-class social movements. In 1911, she joined the Socialist Party of America. She began to write about reconciling Christianity and socialism, taking a class-oriented, economically deterministic stance in her 1912 book Socialism and Character.

=== 1912 Lawrence textile strike ===
The struggle is long, but already on the horizon there dawns the light of the coming day, where man to man shall be brothers the world over. Let us unite—workers, citizens, thinkers—in working for the day of deliverance for which every true American heart must long.

— Excerpt from Scudder's speech during the 1912 Lawrence textile strike

Starting January 11, 1912, workers organized a major textile strike in the city of Lawrence, Massachusetts. Lawrence was one of the largest producers of woolen fabric in the United States, and its diverse population included immigrant workers from across Europe and West Asia. The immediate cause of the strike was a statewide wage cut for Massachusetts workers. Secondary causes included the Lawrence's high cost of living and low life expectancy. Because of her connection to the Socialist Party, Scudder was invited to give a speech at a meeting of striking workers by the wives of several Lawrence |shopkeepers. She arrived in the city on March 3. While she claimed before the Wellesley board of trustees (Note: Scudder's possible relationship with the IWW was a point of contention with the board.) that she initially hesitated to speak after hearing that the meeting might be sponsored by the Industrial Workers of the World (IWW), (Note: Relations between the Socialist Party and the IWW were strained at the time. The Socialist Party, led by Eugene V. Debs, largely supported industrial unionism and political organizing, while the IWW, led by Bill Haywood, largely spurned both in favor of direct action. Scudder herself opposed the IWW's anarchism, anti-intellectualism, and support for violence.) she eventually concluded that it was not and proceeded with the speech.

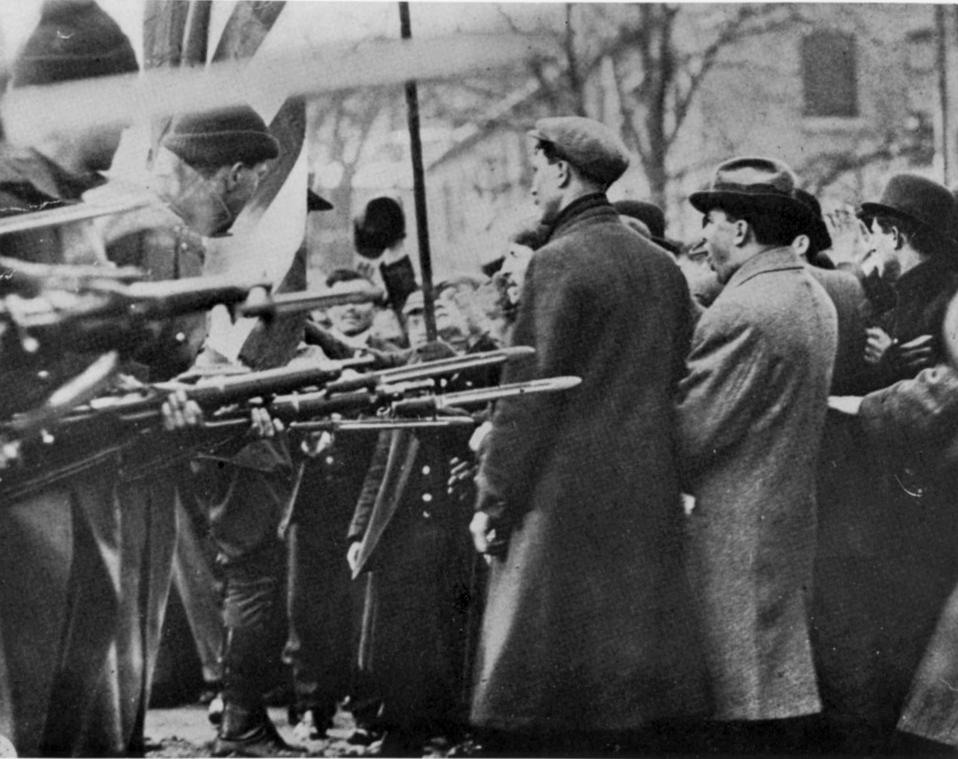
Scudder criticized the persecution faced by workers and their families during the strike.

In her speech, Scudder criticized the persecution of striking workers and their families, called on affluent citizens to defend them against persecution, and praised them for their commitment to justice. However, she noted that "at many points [she] might differ and did differ from the policy endorsed at the meeting" and that she was "no member of the Industrial Workers of the World". The speech, along with that of fellow Wellesley professor Ellen Hayes, was reprinted across the United States, drawing both support and condemnation from the press. Bates, who headed Wellesley's English department at the time, called on Scudder to resign. (Note: Bates eventually apologized for criticizing Scudder.) After explaining her actions to the college's board of trustees, Scudder was allowed to continue teaching but was forced to drop her course "Social Ideals in English Letters" for the upcoming semester.

The strike ended on March 14 after police and the Massachusetts State Militia tried to block a train carrying children leaving Lawrence to live with strike supporters outside the city, leading to a violent confrontation that saw several injuries and arrests. This confrontation, along with a later congressional hearing at which child laborers testified about working conditions at the mills, generated negative publicity for the mill owners. This, combined with the start of the busy March season, forced the owners to accept the strikers' demands for wage increases. Scudder, disappointed by the settlement movement's lack of support for the strike, resigned as head of the Circolo in May. While she remained on its executive committee, she later said that she was "too radical" for it.

=== War and postwar ===
1914 marked the beginning of a difficult period for Scudder. She experienced heavy course loads, and after Wellesley's College Hall burned down that spring, the English department was moved to an improvised wooden structure nicknamed "the hencoop". World War I began in Europe that summer. Like American socialists Eugene V. Debs and Morris Hillquit, Scudder initially opposed American intervention in the war. However, she was not a strict pacifist at the time. She believed that war was inevitable under capitalism and that it could be cathartic under the right circumstances. When the United States joined the war in 1917, she felt "something like relief" and accepted Wilson's reasons for intervention. Scudder later recalled that when the armistice was signed in 1918, the students and faculty at Wellesley "wanted to celebrate it, but... didn’t know how".

Scudder called the period from the end of the war to 1927 her "exhausted years", finding herself distanced from the settlement movement and many of her pacifist friends in the socialist movement. However, she did advocate for academic freedom and social reforms during this time. In 1919, she hosted faculty from Wellesley's economics department in her home to sign a petition protesting Emily Greene Balch's firing. Balch was fired for opposing the war, and the incident triggered a period of "weariness and revulsion" in Scudder. She also helped found the Church League for Industrial Democracy, chairing its executive committee. Between 1920 and 1921, she briefly worked at the Widener Library at Harvard University before traveling to the United Kingdom with Converse again later that year. In 1923, she delivered a series of lectures for the Women's International League for Peace and Freedom in Poděbrady, Czechoslovakia. She retired in 1927, receiving the title of professor emeritus.

== Later life and death ==
Scudder wrote extensively after her retirement, publishing 143 articles and six books. Some of these books covered religious themes—like 1927's The Social Teachings of the Christian Year and Brother John; a Tale of the First Franciscians, 1931's The Franciscan Adventure, 1934's The Christian Attitude Toward Private Property, and The Church and Social Justice, 1939's The Privilege of Age; Essays Secular and Spiritual , and 1940's Father Huntington, Founder of the Order of the Holy Cross. Others, like 1937's On Journey and 1951's My Quest for Reality, were autobiographical. She also remained active in academic and activist circles, regularly corresponding with notable socialists. In 1930, she became dean of Wellesley's Summer School of Christian Ethics, and in 1931, she began working at the New School for Social Research in New York City. She died from asphyxiation in Wellesley on 9 October 1954 after choking on food. She was 93.

== Views on love and sexuality ==
There is a pseudo-love, a bastard thing, once known by me and sometimes directed to me, in which the first note is possessive. Love is so easily confused, not only with sensuous lust, but with the more insidious lust for power. This is of course the last, the worst, expression of the acquisitive instinct, far more dangerous on this spiritual plane than on the material or commercial. It is The Curse. It must be absolutely vanquished before real love can be triumphant or free.

— Vida Scudder, from On Journey (1937)

Scudder discusses her views on love and sexuality in On Journey, criticizing society's emphasis on sex above other types of experiences. Per Scudder, "a woman's life which sex interests have never visited, is a life neither dull nor empty nor devoid of romance". She expresses ambivalence about marriage, saying that "married life looks... often... terribly impoverished, for women" but that "it can be glorious not only in spite of its limitations, but through them". However, she speaks highly of friendship, saying that in her thirties, she developed intimate relationships with women who "[took] possession" of her heart, "not as guests but as owners".

=== Relationships with women ===
Scholars offer various interpretations of Scudder's relationships with women. Researcher Nan Bauer Maglin describes Scudder and Clara French as "very close", noting that working with French was the "dream of [Scudder's] life". Researcher Gary Dorrien argues that French was Scudder's romantic partner. Bauer Maglin also highlights a pasage from On Journey where Scudder says that "one [woman who] has entered the inmost region in my power to open", arguing that this refers to Florence Converse.

Bauer Maglin describes the spaces in which Scudder and Converse lived (such as Wellesley) as homosocial (Note: Bauer Maglin draws on Carroll Smith-Rosenberg's work, describing the development of "female world[s]" and "single-sex networks". She notes that close, intimate friendships between women were common during the mid-19th century but tapered off in the 20th.) and suggests that Scudder's aversion to sexuality was rooted specifically in her rejection of heterosexuality. Faderman, meanwhile, attributes Scudder's aversion to sex to her Victorian sensibilities and describes her as belonging to what Adrienne Rich calls the "lesbian continuum", a broader conception of lesbian identity encompassing close female friendships and companionships. Dorrien explicitly identifies Scudder as a lesbian and argues that Scudder appreciated the settlement movement because it gave her an opportunity to help bisexual and lesbian women.

== Veneration ==
Scudder is honored with a feast day on the liturgical calendar of the Episcopal Church (USA) on October 10.

== Works ==
- How the Rain Sprites Were Freed. Boston: D. Lothrop, 1883.
- Poems by George Macdonald, 1887 (edited with Clara French).
- Mitsu-Yu-Nissi; or, The Japanese Wedding. Chicago: T.S. Denison 1887.
- Macaulay's Essay on Lord Clive. Boston: Sibley and Ducker, 1889 (edited).
- An Introduction to the Writings of John Ruskin. Boston: Leach, Shewell and Sanborn, 1890 edited.
- Topical Outlines for the Study of Modern English Literature. Boston: Frank Wood, 1892.
- Shelley's Prometheus Unbound, 1892 (edited).
- The Witness of Denial. New York: E.P. Dutton, 1895.
- The Life of the Spirit in the Modern English Poets. Boston and New York, Houghton, Mifflin and Company, 1895.
- Socialism and Spiritual Progress: A Speculation. Boston: Church Social Union, 1896.
- Social Ideals in English Letters. Boston and New York: Houghton, Mifflin and Company, 1898 (enlarged edition, 1923).
- Christian Simplicity. Boston: Christian Social Union, 1898.
- Introduction to the Study of English Literature, 1901
- A Listener in Babel: Being a Series of Imaginary Conversations held at the Close of the Last Century and Reported by Vida D. Scudder. Boston: Houghton, Mifflin and Company, 1903.
- Saint Catherine of Siena as Seen in Her Letters. London: J.M. Dent, 1905; New York: E.P. Dutton, 1905 (edited and translated).
- The Disciple of a Saint, Being the Imaginary Biography of Raniero di Landoccio dei Pagliaresi. New York: E.P. Dutton, 1907 (reissued in 1921 and 1927).
- Works of John Woolman, 1910 (edited for Everyman's Library).
- Bede's History of England, 1911 (edited for Everyman's Library).
- Socialism and Character. Boston: Houghton Mifflin, 1912.
- English Poems, 1915 (edited for Lake English Classics).
- The Church and the Hour: Reflections of A Socialist Churchwoman. New York, E.P. Dutton, 1917.
- Le Morte D'Arthur of Sir Thomas Malory and Its Sources, 1917 (edited and translated).
- Social Teachings of the Christian Year: Lectures Delivered at the Cambridge Conference, 1918. New York: E.P. Dutton, 1921.
- Brother John: A Tale of the First Franciscans. Boston: Little, Brown, and Company, 1927.
- The Franciscan Adventure: A Study in the First Hundred Years of the Order of St. Francis of Assisi. London and Toronto: J.M. Dent, 1931; New York: E.P. Dutton, 1931.
- The Christian Attitude Toward Private Property. Milwaukee: Morehouse, 1934.
- On Journey. London: J.M. Dent and Sons, 1937.
- The Privilege of Age: Essays Secular and Spiritual. New York: E.P. Dutton, 1939.
- Father Huntington, Founder of the Order of the Holy Cross. New York: E.P. Dutton, 1940.
- Letters to Her Companions, by Emily Malbone Morgan. Edited by Vida Dutton Scudder, with a biographical sketch by Emily Sophie Brown. Privately printed, 1944.
- My Quest for Reality. Wellesley: Published by the Author, 1952.

== Sources ==
- Bauer Maglin, Nan (1979). "Vida to Florence: 'Comrade and Companion'". Frontiers. 4 (3): 13. doi:10.2307/3346143.
- Boris, Eileen C. (1977). "(Julia) Vida Dutton Scudder". In Garraty, John A. (ed.). Dictionary of American Biography. Supp. 5. New York: Charles Scribner's Sons. pp. 616–617. ISBN 0-684-15054-9.
- Corcoran, Theresa (1979). "Vida Scudder and the Lawrence Textile Strike". Essex Institute Historical Collections. 115 (3): 183–195.
- Dorrien, Gary J. (2021). American Democratic Socialism: History, Politics, Religion, and Theory. New Haven; London: Yale University Press. ISBN 978-0-300-25376-4.
- Faderman, Lillian (1991). Odd Girls and Twilight Lovers: A History of Lesbian Life in Twentieth-century America. New York: Columbia University Press. ISBN 978-0-231-07488-9.
- Fisher, Robert; Fabricant, Michael; Champagne, Lukas (2021). "Settlements and Neighborhood Centers". Oxford Research Encyclopedia of Social Work. Oxford University Press. doi:10.1093/acrefore/9780199975839.013.356.
- Forrant, Robert; Siegenthaler, Jurg (2014). "Introduction". In Forrant, Robert; Siegenthaler, Jurg (eds.). The Great Lawrence Textile Strike of 1912: New Scholarship on the Bread & Roses Strike. Amityville: Baywood Publishing Company. pp. 1–14. ISBN 978-0-89503-864-7.
- Frederick, Peter J. (1970). "Vida Dutton Scudder: The Professor as Social Activist". The New England Quarterly. 43 (3): 407. doi:10.2307/363305.
- Gabrus, Julia Anne (2002). Service and Learning at the Turn of Two Centuries: Lessons from Vida Scudder (PhD thesis). Austin: University of Texas – via ProQuest.
- Goldberg, David J. (2009). "Twentieth-Century Textile Strikes". In Brenner, Aaron; Day, Benjamin; Ness, Immanuel (eds.). The Encyclopedia of Strikes in American History. Armonk; London: M.E. Sharpe. ISBN 978-0-7656-1330-1.
- Lesser Feasts and Fasts 2018. Church Publishing, Inc. 2019. ISBN 978-1-64065-235-4.
- McManus, Margaret M. (1999). "From Deep Wells of Religious Faith": An Interpretation of Vida Scudder's Activism, 1887-1912 (PhD thesis). Berkeley: University of California, Berkeley – via ProQuest.
- Modaff, Abigail (2023). "'The Hidden Life': Ellen Gates Starr, Vida Dutton Scudder, and Catholic Socialist Progressivism". Modern Intellectual History. 20 (4): 1065–1090. doi:10.1017/S1479244323000033. ISSN 1479-2443.
- Mombauer, Annika (2018). "July Crisis 1914". In Ute, Daniel; Gatrell, Peter; Janz, Oliver; Jones, Heather; Kenne, Jennifer D.; Kramer, Alan; Nasson, Bill (eds.). 1914-1918 Online: International Encyclopedia of the First World War. Freie Universität Berlin.
- Palmieri, Patricia A. (1983). "Here Was Fellowship: A Social Portrait of Academic Women at Wellesley College, 1895-1920". History of Education Quarterly. 23 (2): 195. doi:10.2307/368159.
- Rich, Adrienne (1980). "Compulsory Heterosexuality and Lesbian Existence". Signs. 5 (4). University of Chicago Press: 631–660. ISSN 0097-9740. JSTOR 3173834.
- S.B.W. (2023). "Vida Scudder". Research Starters. EBSCO.
- Scudder, Vida Dutton (1937). On Journey. New York: E.P. Dutton & Co.
- Smith, Gary Scott (1993). "Creating a Cooperative Commonwealth: Vida Scudder's Quest to Reconcile Christianity and Socialism, 1890-1920". Anglican and Episcopal History. 62 (3). Historical Society of the Episcopal Church: 397–428. ISSN 0896-8039. JSTOR 42611554.
- Williams, Joyce E.; MacLean, Vicky M. (2015). Settlement Sociology in the Progressive Years: Faith, Science, and Reform. Boston: Brill. ISBN 978-90-04-28756-3.
- Zimmermann, Jens (2012). Incarnational Humanism: A Philosophy of Culture for the Church in the World. Downers Grove: IVP Academic. ISBN 978-0-8308-3903-2.
