= Settlement and community houses in the United States =

Progressive social movement

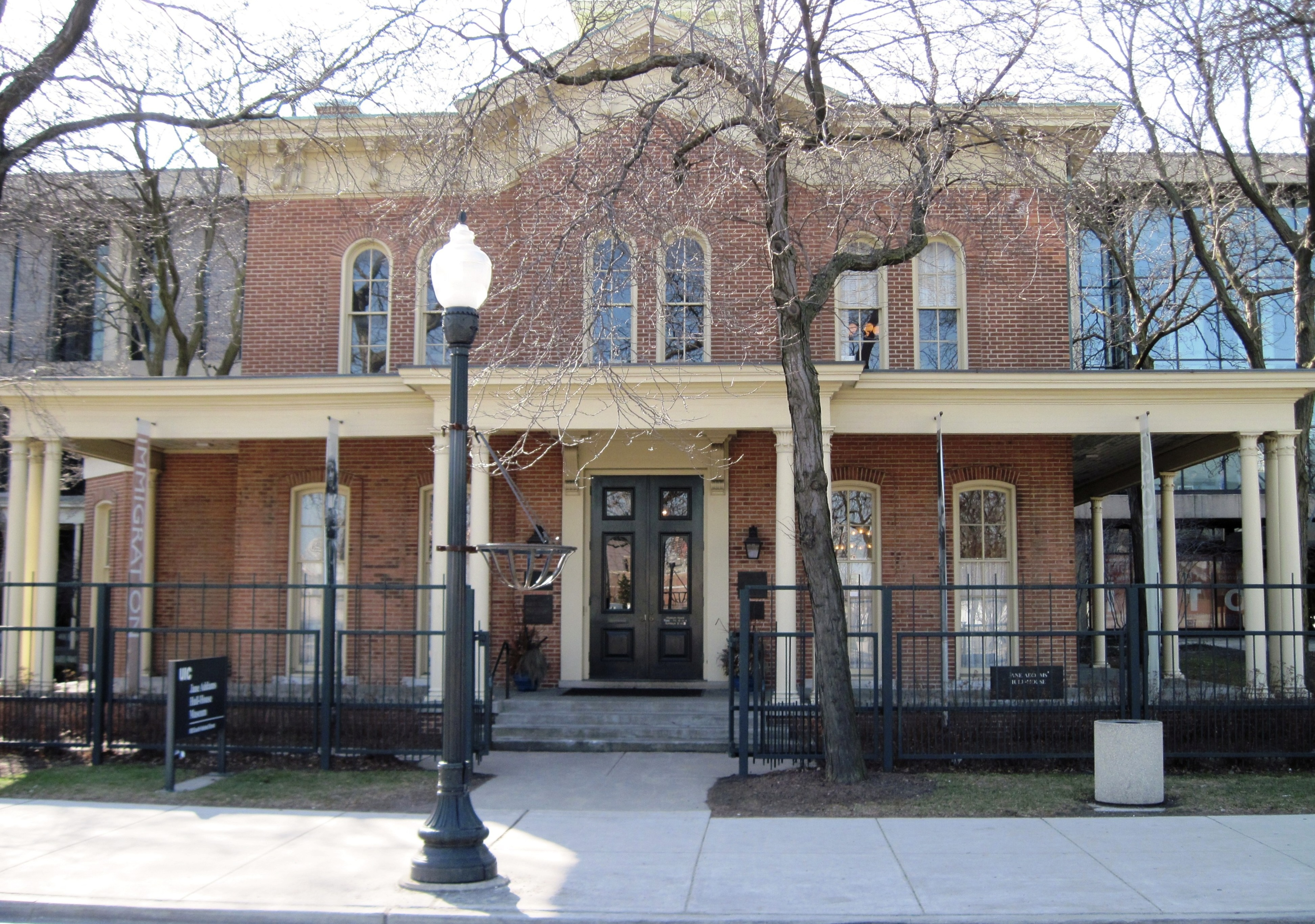
Hull House, Chicago

Settlement and community houses in the United States were a vital part of the settlement movement, a progressive social movement that began in the mid-19th century in London with the intention of improving the quality of life in poor urban areas through education initiatives, food and shelter provisions, and assimilation and naturalization assistance.

== History ==
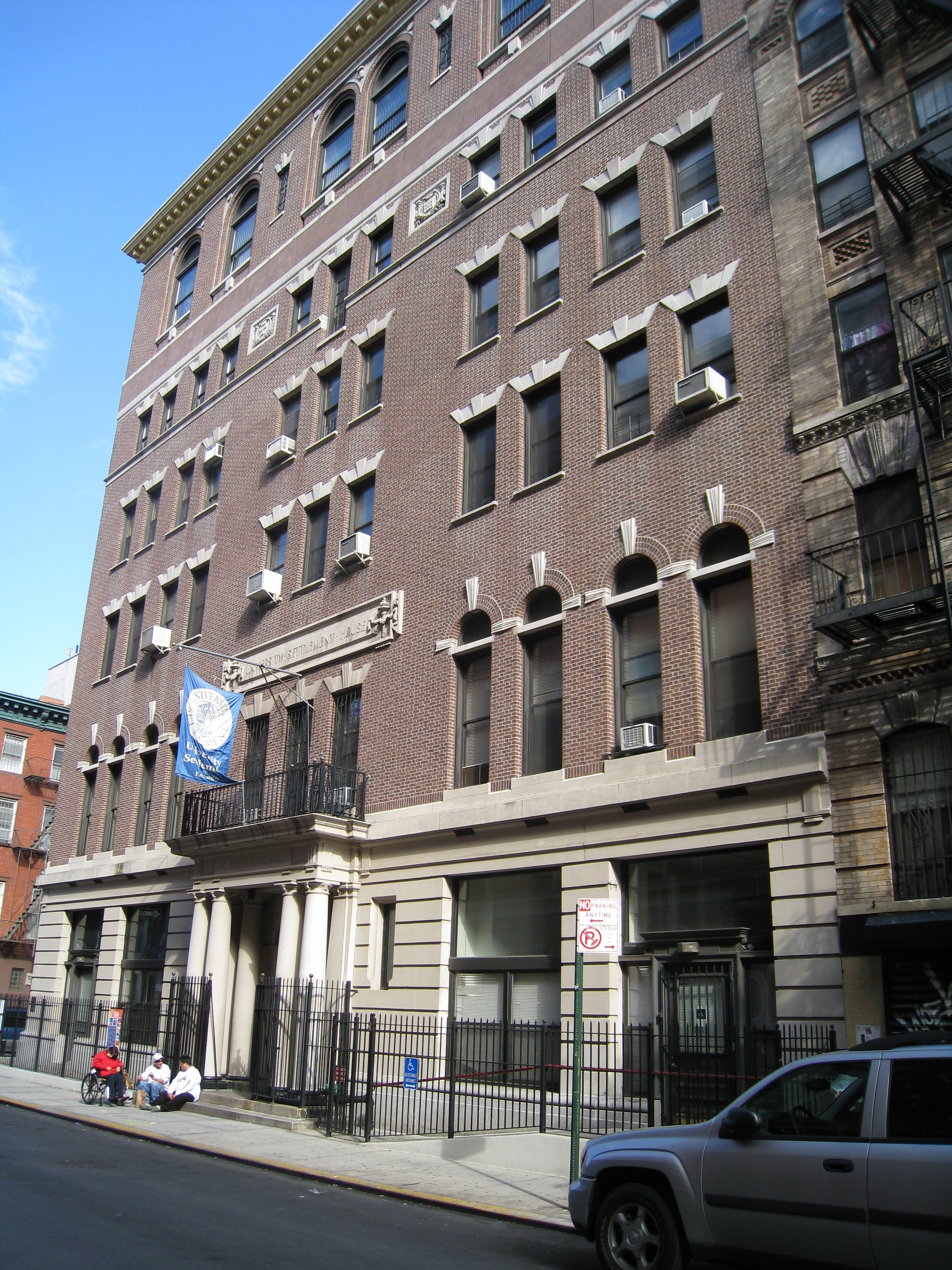
University Settlement House, Manhattan

The movement spread to the United States in the late 1880s, with the opening of the Neighborhood Guild in New York City's Lower East Side in 1886, and the most famous settlement house in the United States, Hull House (1889), was founded soon after by Jane Addams and Ellen Starr in Chicago. By 1887, there were 74 settlement and neighborhood houses in the U.S.; the number grew to over 400 by 1890, and by 1905, New York City alone was home to 119 settlement houses.

Settlement workers often lived in the settlement house, believing that only residents of the area could truly understand the needs of the people who lived there, but a clear class distinction was made between those who gave aid and those who received it. Women played an important role in both the founding and maintenance of these settlement houses; in an era when women were still excluded from leadership roles in business and government, they held pioneering roles in determining the structure, ethics, and responsibilities in the social welfare movement. Women also began to see a need for a more formal education regarding these social services and eventually this led to the development of the field of social work.

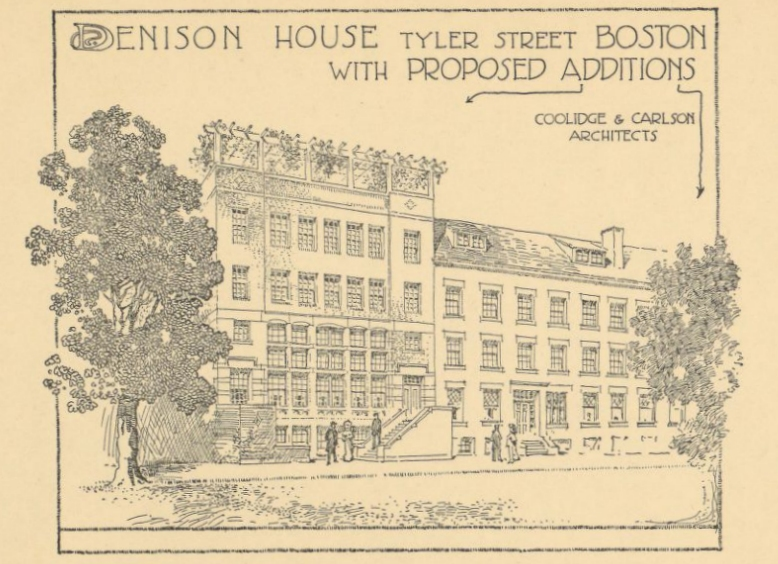
Denison House, Boston

Organizations such as the College Settlements Association, established in 1890, provided support and control of college settlement houses for women. These houses, in New York City, Boston, Philadelphia, and Baltimore were established by college women, controlled by college women, and had a majority of college women as residents.

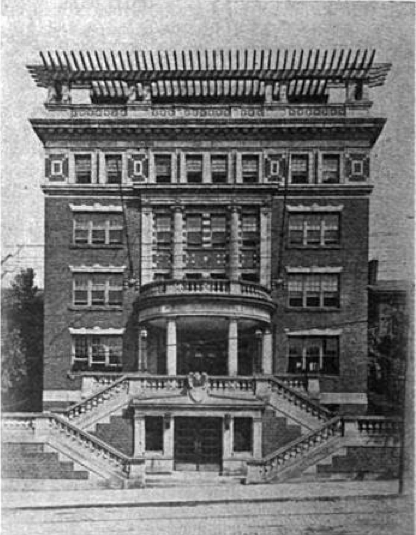
Irene Kaufmann Settlement, Pittsburgh

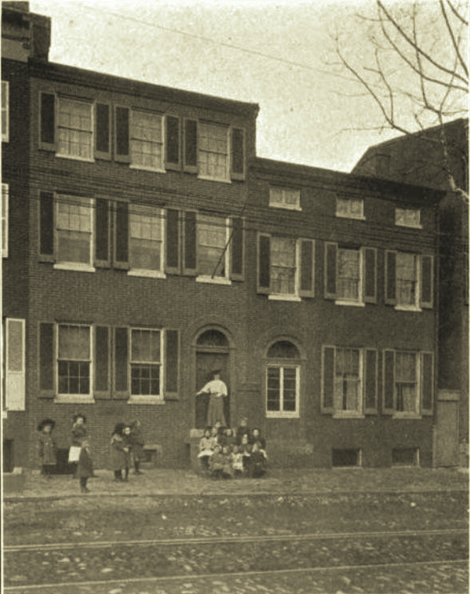
Lawrence House, Baltimore

The need for trained professionals highlighted the shift towards formal, organized settlement houses, often with their own set of ethics, ideology, or religion; funding also became an issue with the need to pay the professional social workers. Typically, financing for the settlement houses and their workers came from wealthy philanthropists who frequently served on the board of directors of the house or association, and government agencies at this point contributed very little to the community agencies.

Although the work of settlement houses aimed at welcoming the immigrants to the new country while encouraging the maintenance of certain aspects of their lifestyles from their native lands, many settlement and community houses, the Downtown Community House included, simultaneously sought to acculturate and Americanize the immigrants they helped by teaching English and instilling them with asserted American values. At the Hull-House, for example, immigrants were educated with classes in history, art, and literature; many community houses had specific Americanization classes and programs. In the Bowling Green Neighborhood Association's annual report in 1926, they stated that they that "never prod[ded] them [the immigrants] into citizenship, but when they have reached the point where they want to become citizens, we give them all the help we can with their papers."

== National conferences ==
A succession of more or less informal national gatherings of settlement workers were held from time to time between 1892 and 1910.

1. Plymouth, Massachusetts (July, 1892)
2. Chicago, Illinois (July 19–21, 1893)
3. New York City, New York (May 3–5, 1895)
4. Detroit, Michigan (N.C.C. 1896)
5. Toronto, Canada (N.C.C. July 7–14, 1897)
6. Chautauqua, New York (Summer, 1897)
7. Chicago (May 15–17, 1899)
8. Chautauqua (July 7–11, 1902)
9. Portland, Maine (N.C.C. 1904)
10. Richmond, Virginia (N.C.C. 1908)
11. White Plains, New York (May, 1908)
12. Buffalo, New York (N.C.C. 1909)
13. St. Louis, Missouri (N.C.C. May 18, 1910)

No continuous or really comprehensive organization was provided for until 1908. In May, 1908, a group of twenty settlement residents from New York, Chicago and Boston met to consult about fuller cooperation among settlements. A study of settlement work was decided upon. It was felt that such an inquiry would disclose a sound basis for broader and more concrete community of interest. During special discussions among the settlement delegates to the National Conference of Charities of that year, a strong feeling developed that such separate meetings should in the future be definitely provided for in connection with the Conference.

The next year, settlement work filled the program of several regular sessions of the National Conference, but one largely attended special gathering of settlement workers was held. It was there decided to arrange for a series of settlement discussions at the following National Conference, which was to take place at St. Louis with Jane Addams as its president. To these meetings, every settlement house and neighborhood center in the country was invited to send representatives. Three sessions were held, and a national committee of ten was appointed to gather and collate the results of settlement experience as to the most needed and most promising directions of service, and to present a year later (1911) at a similar series of meetings in Boston a platform for united action among settlements throughout the country.

== Later years ==
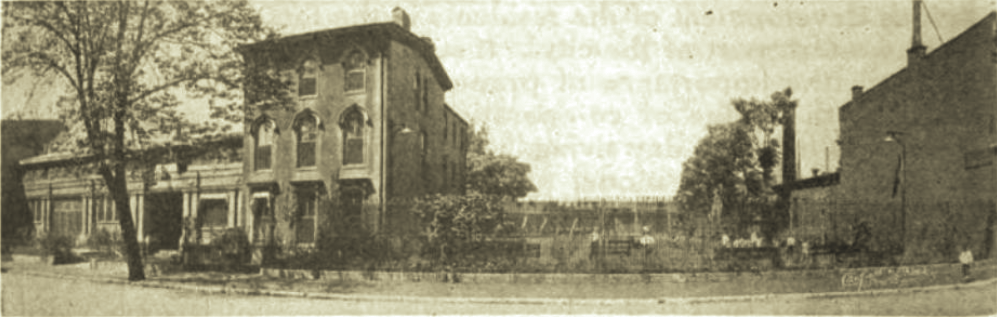
Neighborhood House, Louisville

In the 1920s, settlement house usage began to decline with the reduction of recently arrived immigrants under quotas of the Immigration Act of 1924. Many settlement workers demanded salaried wages and no longer desired to live in the settlement house, and consolidation of settlement houses into larger neighborhood or community centers often led to the selling of the old settlement buildings and moving into larger, newer structures. In 1979, the National Federation of Settlements changed its name to United Neighborhood Centers of America.
