= Boston Women's Heritage Trail =

Series of walking tours in Boston

The Boston Women's Heritage Trail is a series of walking tours in Boston, Massachusetts, leading past sites important to Boston women's history. The tours wind through several neighborhoods, including the Back Bay and Beacon Hill, commemorating women such as Abigail Adams, Amelia Earhart, and Phillis Wheatley. The guidebook includes seven walks and introduces more than 200 Boston women.

The BWHT was created in 1989 by a group of Boston schoolteachers, librarians, and students. It is funded by the nonprofit Boston Educational Development Foundation. The BWHT presents teacher workshops, guided walks, and other activities to promote women's history.

== Walking tours ==
The list of BWHT walking tours currently includes tours of the Back Bay (East), Back Bay (West), Beacon Hill, Charlestown, Chinatown/South Cove, Dorchester, Downtown, Jamaica Plain, Lower Roxbury, Roxbury, the South End, and West Roxbury. It also includes the Artists Walk, which focuses on local women artists, and the Ladies Walk, which commemorates Abigail Adams, Lucy Stone, and Phillis Wheatley.

=== Artists ===
The Artists walk centers on the Back Bay, where many women artists have lived, worked, and exhibited. The walk was designed to complement the 2001 Museum of Fine Arts exhibition, A Studio of Her Own: Women Artists in Boston 1870–1940. Women mentioned include Helen M. Knowlton, Anne Whitney, and others.

=== Back Bay East ===
The Back Bay East walk begins and ends at the Public Garden. Women mentioned include:

- Emily Greene Balch, economist, sociologist and pacifist; winner of the Nobel Peace Prize
- Amy Beach, composer
- Isabella Stewart Gardner, art collector and founder of the Gardner Museum
- Mary Elizabeth Haskell, founder of the Haskell School for Girls
- Harriet Hemenway and Minna Hall, founders of the Massachusetts Audubon Society
- Julia Ward Howe, abolitionist, activist, and author of "The Battle Hymn of the Republic"
- Elma Lewis, arts educator and founder of the National Center of Afro-American Artists
- Florence Luscomb, architect and women's suffragist
- Mary May, founder of the Brimmer and May School
- Sarah Choate Sears, art patron and artist
- Anne Sexton, Pulitzer-winning poet
- Mary Pickard Winsor, founder of the Winsor School
- Sculptors Theo Alice Ruggles Kitson, Anna Coleman Ladd, Mary Moore, Bashka Paeff, Lilian Swann Saarinen, Nancy Schön, Katharine Lane Weems, and Anne Whitney

Also mentioned are Fisher College, Simmons College, and the Winsor School.

=== Back Bay West ===
This walk starts at the Boston Central Library in Copley Square and ends at the Boston Women's Memorial on the Commonwealth Avenue mall. Women mentioned include:

- Abigail Adams, first lady and presidential advisor
- Mary Antin, author and immigration rights activist
- Alice Stone Blackwell, women's suffragist, journalist, and human rights advocate
- Melnea Cass, civil rights activist
- Lucretia Crocker, science educator
- Charlotte Cushman, actress and art patron
- Mary Baker Eddy, founder of the Church of Christ, Scientist
- Katharine Gibbs, founder of Gibbs College
- Louise Imogen Guiney, poet, essayist, and editor
- Anne Hutchinson, religious dissenter
- Alice M. Jordan, founder of the New England Round Table of Children's Librarians
- Mary Morton Kehew, social reform leader
- Ellen Lanyon, artist
- Elma Lewis, arts educator and founder of the National Center of Afro-American Artists
- Lucy Miller Mitchell, pioneering educator
- Maria Mitchell, astronomer
- Cecilia Payne-Gaposchkin, astronomer
- Frances Rich, sculptor
- Ellen Swallow Richards, pioneering environmental chemist
- Sarah Choate Sears, art patron and artist
- Muriel S. Snowden, community activist
- Lucy Stone, suffragist and founder of the Woman's Journal
- Anne Sullivan, teacher of Helen Keller
- Phillis Wheatley, poet
- Marathon runners Joan Benoit, Bobbi Gibb, Nina Kuscsik, Rosa Mota, and Fatuma Roba
- Sculptors Meredith Bergmann, Meta Vaux Warrick Fuller, Penelope Jencks, Theo Alice Ruggles Kitson, Amelia Peabody, Anne Whitney, Frances Rich, and Nancy Schön
- Artists Cecilia Beaux, Susan Hinckley Bradley, Margaret Fitzhugh Browne, Mary Cassatt, Adelaide Cole Chase, Gertrude Fiske, Lilian Westcott Hale, Marie Danforth Page, Lilla Cabot Perry, Louise Stimson, and Sarah Wyman Whitman,
- Philanthropists Ednah Dow Cheney and Pauline Agassiz Shaw
- Crafters Lydia Bush-Brown Head and Mary Crease Sears

=== Beacon Hill ===
The Beacon Hill walk begins at the State House and winds through Beacon Hill, often in parallel with the Black Heritage Trail. Women mentioned include:

- Louisa May Alcott, author
- Ruth Batson, civil rights activist
- Blanche Woodson Braxton, the first African-American woman to be admitted to the Massachusetts Bar Association
- Maria Weston Chapman, founder of the Boston Female Anti-Slavery Society
- Ellen Craft, escaped slave, author, and educator
- Rebecca Lee Crumpler, the first African-American woman physician
- Margaret Deland, author
- Mary Dyer, one of the four executed Quakers known as the Boston martyrs
- Annie Adams Fields, author
- Louise Imogen Guiney, author
- Harriet Hayden, African-American abolitionist
- Anna E. Hirsch, the first woman president of the Board of Trustees of New England School of Law
- Julia Ward Howe, abolitionist, activist, and author of "The Battle Hymn of the Republic"
- Anne Hutchinson, religious dissenter
- Sarah Orne Jewett, author
- Mary Eliza Mahoney, the first professionally trained African-American nurse
- Sophia Palmer and Mary E. P. Davis, founders of the American Nurses Association
- Susan Paul, African-American abolitionist
- Elizabeth Peabody, founder of the first English-language kindergarten in the U.S.
- Rose Standish Nichols, landscape architect
- Linda Richards, the first professionally trained American nurse
- Florida Ruffin Ridley, civil rights activist
- Josephine St. Pierre Ruffin, African-American publisher, civil rights leader, and women's suffragist
- Maria W. Stewart, African-American abolitionist
- Hepzibah Swan, socialite and art patron
- Harriet Tubman, African-American abolitionist, women's suffragist, and Union spy who spent time in Boston
- Anne Whitney, sculptor, including Samuel Adams statue at Faneuil Hall
- Marie Elizabeth Zakrzewska, physician and founder of the New England Hospital for Women and Children
- Sisters of the Society of Saint Margaret, founders of St. Monica's Home

=== Charlestown ===
Women mentioned on the Charlestown walk include:

- Rebecca Lee Crumpler, the first African-American woman physician
- Charlotte Cushman, actress
- Julia Harrington Duff, the first Irish-American woman to serve on the Boston School Committee
- Sarah Josepha Hale, author, instrumental in the creation of Thanksgiving Day in the U.S. and the Bunker Hill Monument
- Harriot Kezia Hunt, an early female physician
- Rosie the Riveter, in connection with the 8,000 women who worked at the Charlestown Navy Yard
- Squaw Sachem, Pawtucket leader
- Elizabeth Foster Vergoose, also known as Mother Goose

=== Chinatown/South Cove ===
The Chinatown/South Cove walk begins at the Boston Common Visitor Center, passes through Chinatown, and ends at Park Square. Women mentioned include:

- Sarah Caldwell, opera conductor and impresario
- Ednah Dow Littlehale Cheney, writer, reformer, and philanthropist
- Harriet Clisby, physician and founder of the Women's Educational and Industrial Union
- Jennie Collins, humanitarian, and one of the first working-class American women to publish a book
- Helena Dudley, director of Denison House
- Amelia Earhart, aviator and social worker at Denison House
- Ruby Foo, restaurateur
- Margaret Fuller, journalist, critic, and women's rights advocate associated with American transcendentalism
- Pauline Hopkins, author, editor of The Colored American
- Mary Morton Kehew, social reform leader
- Rose Lok, aviator, the first Chinese-American woman pilot to solo at Logan Airport
- The Maryknoll Sisters
- Rose Finkelstein Norwood, labor organizer
- Julia O'Connor, labor organizer
- Mary Kenney O'Sullivan, labor organizer
- Elizabeth Peabody, founder of the first English-language kindergarten in the U.S.
- Vida Dutton Scudder, co-founder of Denison House
- Hannah Sabbagh Shakir, founder of the Lebanese-Syrian Ladies' Aid Society
- Frances Stern, one of the first nutritionists in the United States
- Phillis Wheatley, poet

=== Dorchester ===
The Uphams Corner walk in Dorchester, developed by students at Codman Academy, is the first in a planned series of Dorchester walks. Women mentioned include:

- Alice Stone Blackwell, women's suffragist, journalist, and human rights advocate
- Elida Rumsey Fowle, Civil War volunteer and adoptive mother of two emancipated slave children
- Sarah Wentworth Apthorp Morton, poet
- Anna Clapp Harris Smith, founder of the Animal Rescue League of Boston
- Hepzibah Swan, socialite and art patron
- Geraldine Trotter, editor and activist

=== Downtown ===
Starting at the State House and ending at the corner of Franklin and Washington Streets, the Downtown walk passes some of Boston's oldest historic sites. Women mentioned include:

- Abigail Adams, wife of John Adams
- Hannah Adams, the first woman in the U.S. who worked professionally as a writer
- Jennie Loitman Barron, the first woman appointed to the Massachusetts Superior Court
- Clara Barton, founder of the American Red Cross
- Alice Stone Blackwell, women's suffragist, journalist, and human rights advocate
- Maria Weston Chapman, founder of the Boston Female Anti-Slavery Society
- Lydia Maria Child, abolitionist and women's rights activist
- Lucretia Crocker, science educator
- Sheila Levrant de Bretteville, artist
- Dorothea Dix, activist on behalf of the indigent insane who created the first generation of American mental asylums
- Julia Harrington Duff, the first Irish-American woman to serve on the Boston School Committee
- Mary Dyer, one of the four executed Quakers known as the Boston martyrs
- Mary Baker Eddy, founder of the Church of Christ, Scientist
- Annie Adams Fields, author
- Eliza Lee Cabot Follen, author and abolitionist
- Abiah Folger Franklin, mother of Benjamin Franklin
- Sarah and Angelina Grimké, abolitionists and women's suffragists
- Mary Tileston Hemenway, philanthropist
- Harriet Hosmer, sculptor
- Anne Hutchinson, religious dissenter
- Helen Hunt Jackson, author
- Edmonia Lewis, sculptor
- Mary Livermore, journalist and women's rights advocate
- Grace Lorch, teacher and civil rights activist
- Amy Lowell, poet
- Florence Luscomb, architect and women's suffragist
- Abby May, school founder, activist, and one of the first social workers in Massachusetts
- Jane Mecom, sister and confidant of Benjamin Franklin
- Elizabeth Murray, businesswoman and proto-feminist during the American Revolution
- Judith Sargent Murray, women's rights advocate, essayist, playwright, and poet
- Mary Kenney O'Sullivan, labor organizer
- Sarah Parker Remond, African-American abolitionist
- Susanna Rowson, playwright and actress
- Josephine St. Pierre Ruffin, African-American publisher, civil rights leader, and women's suffragist
- Frances Slanger, the first American nurse in Europe to be killed in combat during World War II
- Lucy Stone, suffragist and founder of the Woman's Journal
- Anne Sullivan, teacher of Helen Keller
- Elizabeth Foster Vergoose, also known as Mother Goose
- Mercy Otis Warren, political writer of the American Revolution
- Phillis Wheatley, poet
- Female speakers at Faneuil Hall, including Susette La Flesche and Sarah Josepha Hale

=== Jamaica Plain ===
Women mentioned on the Jamaica Plain walk include:

- Emily Greene Balch, economist, sociologist and pacifist; winner of the Nobel Peace Prize
- Ednah Dow Littlehale Cheney, writer, reformer, and philanthropist
- Mary Emilda Curley, wife of James Michael Curley
- Susan Walker Fitzgerald, the first female Democrat elected to the Massachusetts State Legislature
- Margaret Fuller, journalist, critic, and women's rights advocate associated with American transcendentalism
- Maud Cuney Hare, musician, musicologist, and civil rights activist
- Elizabeth Peabody, founder of the first English-language kindergarten in the U.S.
- Sylvia Plath, poet
- Ellen Swallow Richards, pioneering environmental chemist
- Mary Joseph Rogers, founder of the Maryknoll Sisters
- Pauline Agassiz Shaw, philanthropist and social reformer
- Judith Winsor Smith, abolitionist and women's suffragist
- Lucy Stone, suffragist and founder of the Woman's Journal
- Marie Elizabeth Zakrzewska, physician and founder of the New England Hospital for Women and Children

=== Ladies Walk ===
The Ladies Walk celebrates the lives of First Lady Abigail Adams, suffragist Lucy Stone, and poet Phillis Wheatley. It starts at the Boston Women's Memorial on Commonwealth Avenue and ends at Faneuil Hall.

=== Lower Roxbury ===
Women mentioned on the Lower Roxbury walk include:

- Melnea Cass, civil rights activist

=== North End Walk ===
The North End walk begins at Faneuil Hall, passes through the North End, and ends at St. Leonard's Church, one of the first Italian churches in the U.S. It overlaps at several points with the Freedom Trail. Women mentioned on this walk include:

- Charlotte Cushman, actress
- Goody Glover, the last person to be hanged in Boston as a witch
- Fanny Goldstein, librarian and the founder of Jewish Book Week
- Edith Guerrier, founder of the Saturday Evening Girls
- Sarah Josepha Hale, founder of the Boston Seaman's Aid Society
- Lina Frank Hecht, founder of the Hebrew Industrial School
- Harriot Kezia Hunt, an early female physician
- Rose Fitzgerald Kennedy, mother of John F. Kennedy
- Clementina Poto Langone, Italian-American civic leader
- Judith Sargent Murray, women's rights advocate, essayist, playwright, and poet
- Rachel Walker Revere, wife of Paul Revere
- Pauline Agassiz Shaw, founder of the North Bennet Street Industrial School
- Helen Osborne Storrow, philanthropist
- Sophie Tucker, entertainer

=== Roxbury ===
Women mentioned on the Roxbury walk include:

- Melnea Cass, civil rights activist
- Jessie Gideon Garnett, the first African-American woman dentist in Boston
- Ellen Swepson Jackson, educator and activist
- Elma Lewis, arts educator and founder of the National Center of Afro-American Artists
- Mary Eliza Mahoney, the first professionally trained African-American nurse
- Lucy Miller Mitchell, daycare pioneer, co-founder of Head Start and Freedom House
- Sarah-Ann Shaw, television reporter
- Muriel S. Snowden, co-founder of Freedom House, recipient of MacArthur Genius Grant
- Maude Trotter Steward, newspaper editor
- Geraldine Pindell Trotter, editor and activist

=== South End ===
The South End walk starts at Back Bay Station and ends at the Boston Center for the Arts. Women mentioned on the Sound End walk include:

- Louisa May Alcott, author
- Tina Allen, sculptor
- Maria Louise Baldwin, African-American educator and civic leader
- Mary McLeod Bethune, educator and school founder
- Melnea Cass, civil rights activist
- Lucretia Crocker, science educator
- Estella Crosby, co-founder of the Boston branch of the National Housewives League
- Wilhelmina Marguerita Crosson, educator and early advocate of black history education
- Rebecca Lee Crumpler, the first African-American woman physician
- Fern Cunningham, sculptor; created the first sculpture honoring a woman (Harriet Tubman) in a Boston public space
- Mildred Davenport, renowned African-American dancer and dance instructor
- Mary Baker Eddy, founder of the Church of Christ, Scientist
- Meta Vaux Warrick Fuller, artist, sculptor
- Frieda Garcia, community activist
- Louise Imogen Guiney, poet, essayist, and editor
- Harriet Boyd Hawes, pioneering archaeologist
- Coretta Scott King, civil rights activist and wife of Martin Luther King Jr.
- Louise Chandler Moulton, author and critic
- Mary Safford-Blake, the first woman gynecologist
- Susie King Taylor, escaped slave, author, and the first African-American Army nurse
- Harriet Tubman, African-American abolitionist, women's suffragist, and Union spy who spent time in Boston
  - Julia O. Henson, activist, donated the building for Harriet Tubman House in 1904
- Myrna Vázquez, renowned actress in Puerto Rico; South End community activist
- Anna Quincy Waterston, author
- E. Virginia Williams, founder of the Boston Ballet
- Mary Evans Wilson, founder of the Women's Service Club
- Members of the Lebanese-Syrian Ladies' Aid Society
- Students of the Boston Normal School and the New England Female Medical College

=== West Roxbury ===
Women mentioned on the West Roxbury walk include:

- Mary Draper, Revolutionary war activist
- Margaret Fuller, journalist, critic, and women's rights advocate associated with American transcendentalism
- Sophia Ripley, feminist associated with American transcendentalism
- Evelyn Shakir, Lebanese-American scholar and author
- Marian Walsh, Massachusetts state senator

== See also ==
- Salem Women's Heritage Trail
