= Mary Morton Kehew =

American labor and social reformer

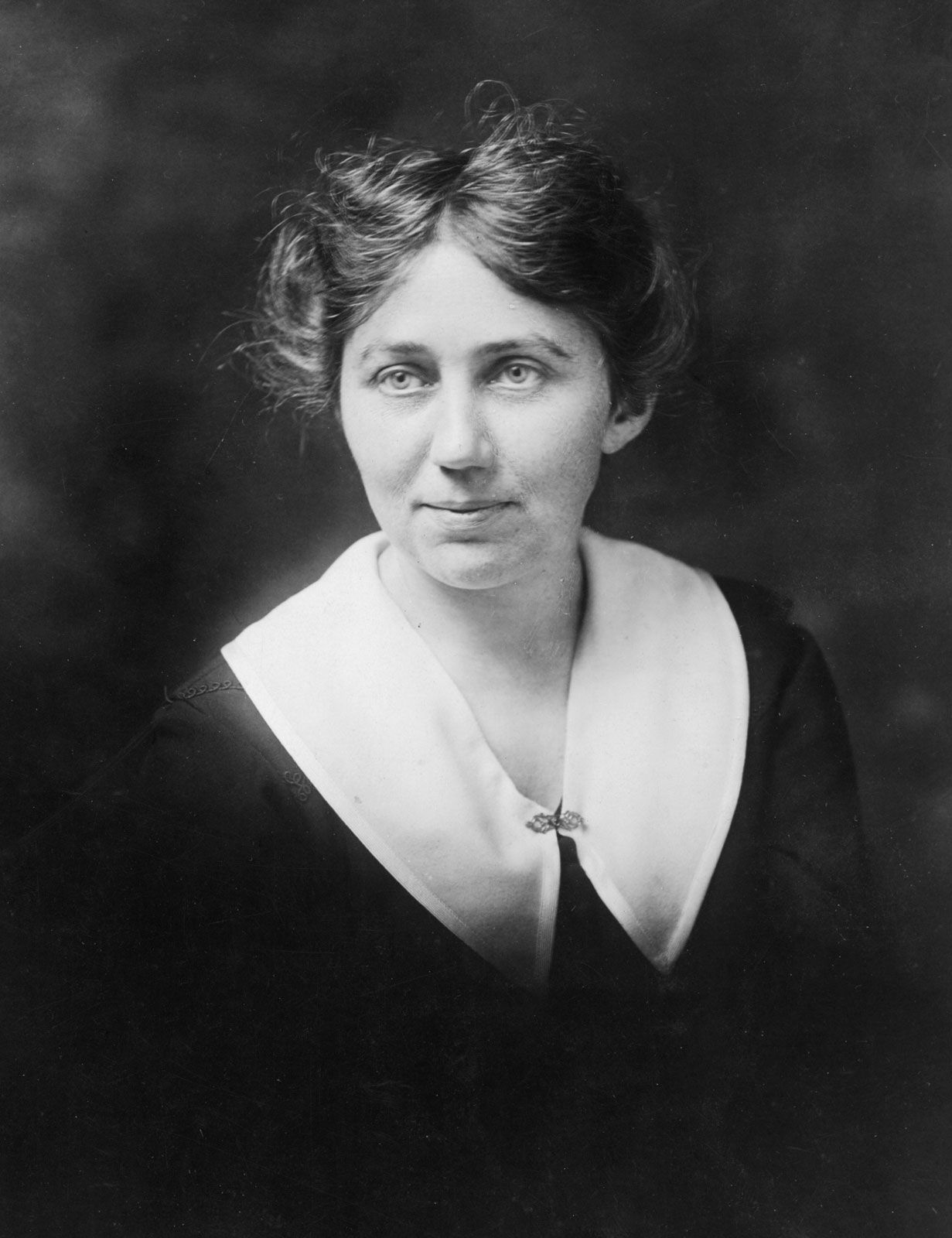
- Born: September 8, 1859; Boston, U.S.
- Died: February 13, 1918 (aged 58); Boston, U.S.
- Known for: Labor and social reform
- Spouse: William Brown Kehew

Mary Morton Kehew (September 8, 1859 – February 13, 1918) was an American labor and social reformer. She was a president of the Women's Educational and Industrial Union, a trustee of Simmons College, and the first president of the National Women's Trade Union League. She was also active in the women's suffrage movement, and on behalf of the blind.

== Early life ==
Kehew was born Mary Morton Kimball in Boston, Massachusetts, on September 8, 1859. She was the fourth of eight children of Moses Day Kimball, a banker, and Susan Tillinghast Kimball (née Morton). Her maternal grandfather was former Massachusetts governor Marcus Morton. She was privately educated in Boston and in Europe. On January 8, 1880, she married William Brown Kehew, a wealthy oil merchant. The couple had no children.

== Career ==
Like many Boston Brahmin women, Kehew spent much of her time volunteering. Rather than focusing on charity work, however, she used her social position and political connections on behalf of working class women. Quiet and self-effacing, she preferred to work behind the scenes, lobbying legislators and soliciting donations from her wealthy friends.

In 1886, Kehew joined the Women's Educational and Industrial Union (WEIU), a cross-class organization dedicated to improving working conditions for women. She served as WEIU president from 1892 to 1913 and as chairman of its board of government from 1914 to 1918. Under her leadership, the WEIU was transformed from a charity group to one focused on educating and organizing female workers. It provided legal advice, counseling, educational classes, and vocational training. Simmons College took on some of the WEIU's vocational training when it was founded in 1902; Kehew was on the college's first board of trustees. In 1905 she established the WEIU's research department, which conducted statistical studies on the lives of working women. This research was used to support legislative proposals pertaining to moneylending, pensions, sanitation, and the minimum wage, and eventually led to the creation of the Massachusetts Department of Labor and Industry.

In 1894, with Mary Kenney O'Sullivan, Kehew co-founded the Union for Industrial Progress, an auxiliary of the WEIU focused on trade unionism for women. Between 1896 and 1901, the group organized unions to defend the interests of laundry workers, bookbinders, and workers in the tobacco and garment industries.

In 1903 she became the first president of the National Women's Trade Union League, a group that supported the organization of labor unions and strove to eliminate sweatshop conditions for women.

She served on several legislative committees, investigating working conditions in Massachusetts, and provided financial and other support for various social reform organizations, including the Milk and Baby Hygiene Association, the Tyler Street Day Nursery, and Denison House. She was active in the women's suffrage movement, worked on behalf of the blind, and served on the executive committee of the Massachusetts Child Labor Commission.

== Death and memorials ==
She died of nephritis on February 13, 1918, at her home at 29 Chestnut Street in Boston and is buried in Mount Auburn Cemetery. That April, the WEIU held a memorial service for her at Huntington Hall. Speakers included her friend and fellow reformer, Emily Greene Balch, who remembered her as "the never failing fairy godmother" of Boston social and labor reform, and the director of the Ohio State School for the Blind, who credited her with organizing "the first work to be conducted with the adult blind 15 years ago in her own office." John F. Tobin, a union leader, described her as a friend of the workingman whose "sympathies were always on the right side."

Kehew is remembered on the Boston Women's Heritage Trail in connection with the WEIU. She is also included in Nine Notable Women, a mural painted by Ellen Lanyon in 1980. The nine notable women are Anne Hutchinson, Phillis Wheatley, Sister Ann Alexis, Lucy Stone, Mary Baker Eddy, Ellen S. Richards, Mary Morton Kehew, Anne Sullivan, and Melnea Cass.

== Sources ==
- Commire, Anne, ed. (1999). Women in World History: A Biographical Encyclopedia. Waterford, CT: Yorkin Publications, Gale Group. ISBN 0787640808.
- Encyclopedia of Women Social Reformers. ABC-CLIO. 2001. ISBN 9781576071014.
- "Chinatown/South Cove". Boston Women's Heritage Trail.
- "Back Bay West". Boston Women's Heritage Trail.
- "MARY MORTON KEHEW FUNERAL TOMORROW: Active Head for 20 Years of Women's E. and I. Union Prominent Club Woman Took Deep Interest in Social Work". The Boston Daily Globe. February 14, 1918.
- "LAUD LIFE WORK OF MARY MORTON KEHEW: Eminent Men and Women Sing Her Praise; Sympathies of Late Philanthropist 'Always on Right Side,' Says Tobin". The Boston Daily Globe. April 15, 1918.
