= Frances Stern =

American nutritionist (1873–1947)

- Born: July 3, 1873; Boston, Massachusetts, U.S.
- Died: December 23, 1947 (aged 74); Newton, Massachusetts, U.S.
- Occupations: Nutritionist, Social Worker

Frances Stern (1873–1947) was one of the first nutritionists in the United States. In 1918 she founded the Boston Dispensary Food Clinic, which evolved into what is now the Frances Stern Nutrition Center at Tufts Medical Center.

== Early life and education ==
Frances Stern was born in Boston, the youngest of seven children of Louis Stern, a boot and shoe dealer, and Caroline (Oppenheimer) Stern, both German Jewish immigrants. After completing grammar school, she volunteered as a teacher at the Jewish Sunday School founded by Lina Frank Hecht in the North End of Boston. Around 1890 she began working at the Hebrew Industrial School for Girls, a settlement house also founded by Hecht. In 1895, Stern and her friend Isabel Hyams (or Hymans) started the Louisa May Alcott Club in the South End of Boston to teach English, cooking, and sewing to the local immigrant girls. According to her Boston Globe obituary, the club also taught shoemaking.

Stern graduated from the Garland Kindergarten Training School in 1897. While enrolled there, she developed what became a lifelong interest in teaching nutrition to children. She studied the work of Ellen H. Richards and went to work in Richards' lab as her assistant. While working for Richards she became a special student at the Massachusetts Institute of Technology (MIT), where she took courses in chemistry and food sanitation in 1909, 1911, and 1912. She also studied economics and politics as a special student at the London School of Economics in 1922.

== Career ==
While studying at MIT, she developed visiting housekeeping programs for the Boston Association for the Relief and Control of Tuberculosis and the Boston Provident Association. From 1912 to 1915, she was an industrial health inspector for the State Board of Labor and Industries. (She may have worked with labor organizer Mary Kenney O'Sullivan, who started working there as a factory inspector in 1914.) Through her work, she learned that many low-income and working-class people were suffering needless hardship and illness because of a lack of knowledge of proper nutrition. After several years of research, she published her first book, Food for the Worker, in which she suggested creating neighborhood centers that would provide practical nutrition education. In 1914, she also found time to serve on the Welfare Committee of the Boston Federated Jewish Charities.

During World War I, Stern worked for the Food Conservation Division of the United States Food Administration, and with the American Red Cross in France.

=== Boston Dispensary Food Clinic ===
In 1918, at the request of Dr. Michael Davis, director of the Boston Dispensary, Stern established a food clinic. The Boston Dispensary Food Clinic was the first of its kind and inspired the creation of food clinics around the world. It started with one desk, two chairs, and a few patients each week who were referred by state social services. It quickly grew into an important care facility for the large number of mostly Russian, Italian, and Syrian immigrants who had arrived in Boston in the early 1900s. The clinic not only provided practical advice on food preparation for patients, but conducted research on the relationships between class and ethnicity, health and nutrition, and the effects of industrial work on health.

In 1925 she established a Nutrition Education Department to teach dietetics to medical personnel and social workers. The League of Nations sent representatives to the clinic for training, and the Rockefeller Foundation selected the clinic as a training ground for the hospital dieticians it brought in from Europe and Asia. Stern was awarded an honorary A. M. degree from Tufts in 1938 and became a special instructor in dietetics and social work at Simmons College. She also taught at Tufts, MIT, Regis College, and Framingham Teachers College.

For her 70th birthday in 1943, friends endowed the Frances Stern chair in nutrition at Tufts Medical School and added her name to the food clinic she had founded 25 years earlier.

Toward the end of her life she fell ill and used a wheelchair, but continued to teach nutrition. She was skilled at presenting the material in a way that could be easily understood by non-English speakers as well as by children, and often used visual aids such as charts, wax models of food, and dishes.

She died of a heart attack at her home in Newton, Massachusetts, on December 23, 1947. She is remembered on the Boston Women's Heritage Trail.

== Books ==
- Stern, Frances; Spitz, Gertrude (1917). Food for the Worker: The Food Values and Cost of a Series of Menus and Recipes for Seven Weeks. Boston: Whitcomb & Barrows. With foreword by Lafayette Mendel.
- Stern, Frances (1930). The Nutritionist Looks at Mental Hygiene. New York: National Committee for Mental Hygiene.
- Stern, Frances; Pfaffmann, Mary (1932). Food and Your Body: Talks for Children. Boston: M. Barrows & Company.
- Stern, Frances (1936). Applied Dietetics: The Planning and Teaching of Normal and Therapeutic Diets. Baltimore: Williams & Wilkins.
- Stern, Frances; Pfaffmann, Mary (1942). How to Teach Nutrition to Children. New York: M. Barrows.
- Stern, Frances; Rosenthal, Helen; Rosenthal, Joseph (1946). Diabetic Care in Pictures: Simplified Statements with Illustrations Prepared for the Use of the Patient. Philadelphia: J.B. Lippincott Company.
