= Helena Dudley =

American social worker, labor organizer and pacifist

Helena Stuart Dudley
- Born: August 31, 1858; Florence, Nebraska, U.S.
- Died: September 29, 1932 (aged 74); Geneva, Switzerland
- Education: Bryn Mawr College
- Known for: social worker, labor organizer

Helena Dudley (August 31, 1858 – September 29, 1932) was an American social worker, labor organizer, and pacifist. As director of Denison House in Boston from 1893 to 1912, she was an influential leader in the early settlement movement, and aided thousands of poor and working-class immigrants at a time when government relief programs were lacking. Appalled by the working conditions in local sweatshops, which she learned of through her settlement house neighbors, she became increasingly active in the labor movement. She helped organize the Women's Trade Union League in 1903, and supported the Bread and Roses strike in 1912. After World War I she worked to promote the League of Nations, and for many years she was a leading member of the Women's International League for Peace and Freedom.

== Biography ==
=== Early life ===
Dudley was born in Florence, Nebraska, the only child of Judson H. and Caroline Bates Dudley. Her father was one of the original settlers of Denver, Colorado, and made a fortune in silver mining and real estate. During Helena's childhood her father's financial situation fluctuated dramatically and the family moved from place to place around the Western United States. At the age of 26 she entered the Massachusetts Institute of Technology, where she studied for a year before transferring to Bryn Mawr College. As a biology major, she helped pay her way through school by working as a laboratory assistant, graduating in 1889 with the first Bryn Mawr class.

After graduating, she taught biology at the Pratt Institute and the Packer Institute, both in Brooklyn. In May 1890 she joined the College Settlements Association (CSA), a group of college-educated women who operated settlement houses in Boston, New York, and Philadelphia. In 1892 she gave up her teaching career to become the first "head worker" at the CSA settlement house in Philadelphia. When Emily Greene Balch resigned as head of Denison House in 1893, Dudley moved to Boston to replace her.

=== Denison House ===
Dudley served as head worker, or director in residence, at Denison House from 1893 to 1912. Arriving during the Panic of 1893, she immediately set to work organizing the house as a relief agency that could distribute such basic necessities as milk and coal. In December she started a sewing room, which employed 324 women over the winter. The Wells Memorial Institute provided the workrooms rent-free, and Dudley raised funds for materials and other expenses. For a flat wage of 75 cents a day, the women manufactured undergarments, hospital gowns, bed linen, and the like for institutions such as the Red Cross and Boston City Hospital. In her written account of the project, Dudley was careful to note that the women were not competing with local businesses; for example, hospital gowns were usually made by nurses in their spare time at work.

Under her direction, Denison House became an important neighborhood center, offering classes in nursing, English literature, crafts, cooking, and carpentry, as well as sports and a summer camp for children, and clubs for adults. It had a library, a gymnasium, and a clinic. Later, Dudley cooperated with Robert Archey Woods and other residents of South End House—Boston's first settlement house, located just a few blocks away—to hold art exhibitions, conduct housing investigations, and campaign for public bathhouses and gymnasiums. Along with Woods and other movement leaders such as Jane Addams and Mary Simkhovitch, she helped organize the National Federation of Settlements in 1908.

=== Labor activism ===
Most settlement workers were upper-middle- to upper-class women who, as Dudley acknowledged, had at least as much to learn from the community as they had to give to it. In a speech at Wesleyan Hall in 1895, Dudley said that the college women had learned, through their work at the settlement house, "of the conditions which press upon the wage earners. We have found women making shirts for 37 and a half cents a dozen...and it is because of this knowledge that we have become interested in trade unions."

Increasingly, Dudley came to believe that settlements, useful as they were to the community, could not provide what working people needed most: a living wage. She was no doubt influenced by Mary Kenney O'Sullivan and her husband, both labor activists, who lived at Denison House in the 1890s. Another colleague, Vida Scudder, helped organize the Federal Labor Union (FLU), a group of "professional people" affiliated with the American Federation of Labor. Dudley joined the union and served as its delegate to the Boston Central Labor Union for several years. Through the FLU, she and other Denison House residents organized Boston's garment workers in 1894. It was one of several unions that held regular meetings at Denison House during Dudley's tenure.

In 1903, all three women—Dudley, O'Sullivan, and Scudder—helped organize the Women's Trade Union League. O'Sullivan became secretary of the organization, and Dudley served for a time as vice president of its Boston branch. A few years later, all three women suffered professional consequences for supporting the 1912 Lawrence textile strike. Scudder gave a speech to the strikers that was widely publicized, and nearly lost her teaching position at Wellesley. Dudley and O'Sullivan were mentioned in the Boston Globe when they paid the bail of $500 each for Joseph Ettor and Arturo Giovannitti, strike leaders who had been arrested on trumped-up charges. O'Sullivan subsequently lost her job at the WTUL, and Dudley and Scudder were forced to resign from Denison House.

=== Later years ===
Helena Dudley became Cornelia Lyman Warren's friend. Warren bought the location for the first Denison House. When Dudley retired in 1912, Warren built her a house at her family estate, Cedar Hill. Dudley lived at Cedar Hill until Warren died in 1921.

After retirement Dudley focused her volunteer efforts on the cause of world peace. She joined the board of the Massachusetts branch of the Women's International League for Peace and Freedom and remained involved with that organization for the rest of her life. After World War I she worked to promote the League of Nations, making several trips to Europe. In the 1920s she joined the Socialist party. A devout Episcopalian, Dudley was also a member of the Companionship of the Holy Cross, and volunteered at Adelynrood, the society's retreat center in Byfield, Massachusetts.

During the last decade of her life, she lived with her close friend Scudder in Wellesley, Massachusetts. In 1932, she and Scudder attended the seventh congress of the Women's International League in Grenoble, France. Shortly afterwards, while visiting friends in Geneva, Switzerland, Dudley was taken ill and died at the age of 74.

Dudley is remembered in connection with Denison House on the Boston Women's Heritage Trail.

== Writings ==
- Dudley, Helena S. (1894). "Relief Work Carried on in the Wells Memorial Institute". The Annals of the American Academy of Political and Social Science. 5 (3): 61–81. doi:10.1177/000271629400500304. JSTOR 1008725. S2CID 143641849.
- "Women's Work in Boston Settlements". Municipal Affairs. 1898.

== See also ==
- Settlement movement
- Christian socialism
