= Hannah Sabbagh Shakir =

Lebanese-American businesswoman

- Hannah Shakir and the Lebanese-Syrian Ladies' Aid Society, 1925
- Born: Hannah Sabbagh; October 15, 1895; Ottoman Empire
- Died: April 22, 1990 (aged 94); West Roxbury, Boston, Massachusetts, U.S.
- Resting place: Gethsemane Cemetery, West Roxbury
- Occupations: Dressmaker, Factory owner
- Spouse: Wadie E. Shakir
- Children: 2

Hannah Sabbagh Shakir (1895-1990) was a Lebanese-American businesswoman who co-founded the Lebanese-Syrian Ladies' Aid Society of Boston with 13 other Syrian women, including; Adele Ashook, Adelle Shayab, Rose Handy, Sady Besharra and others. The first President was Sadie Abdelnour. The Society's fundraising events made it a center of social life for Boston's Arabic-speaking community for many years. Shakir was also an entrepreneur who went from working in a factory to owning a successful clothing factory. She is remembered on the Boston Women's Heritage Trail.

== Early life ==
She was born in 1895 in Ain el Rwmmaneh, a small village in the mountains of Lebanon, then in the Ottoman Empire to George Sabbagh and Marion Ashook. In 1907, she migrated with her family to the United States. At the age of fourteen she began working in the textile mills of Fall River, Massachusetts. She said in an interview later, "We made gingham. I learned to operate the looms, six big looms, just like a man. I did it very well." As a young woman she worked as a stitcher in a Boston textile factory.

== Lebanese-Syrian Ladies' Aid Society ==
On November 13, 1917, Hannah Sabbagh Shakir and 12 other immigrant women from St. George's Orthodox Church formed a group called the Society for the Relief of Syria and Lebanon. The original aim was to provide aid to people in their homeland who were suffering from hunger, terror, and disease in the wake of World War I. The women went door-to-door recruiting members, and within a week their ranks had grown to more than 250. Members were mostly from Mount Lebanon, Beirut, and Damascus, and included Maronites and Melkites as well as Orthodox Christians. As more and more refugees arrived in the United States, the women decided to focus on helping needy Syrian and Lebanese people in the Boston area, and in July 1918 they renamed the group the Syrian Ladies' Aid Society of Boston. (At the time, Arabic-speaking immigrants were usually referred to as Syrians, since most of them came from the Ottoman Province of Syria, which included what is now Lebanon, most of Jordan, Palestine/Israel, and Syria.)

To raise funds, the women put collection boxes in local stores, sold and raffled off their own handmade lace and embroidery, and organized dances, rummage sales, plays, picnics, and other activities. With the proceeds, they supplied poor families with milk, coal, and other aid, such as a pair of eyeglasses for a young girl. They held their first meetings in rooms provided by St. George's Church. By May 1920 they were able to rent their own flat.

In addition to fundraising, the women visited the sick in hospitals, marched in parades, and hosted prominent speakers such as Abraham Mitrie Rihbany and Kahlil Gibran. Men who paid dues were also admitted as honorary members, and helped out in various ways. By the mid-1920s the club had 400 members and was headquartered at 101 Tyler Street—next door to Denison House, the neighborhood settlement house. In 1929, the Society bought a house at 44 West Newton Street. Following the stock market crash of 1929, the Society served as an informal employment agency and provided financial aid to the families of the unemployed.

In 1962 the club was renamed the Lebanese-Syrian Ladies' Aid Society. Membership began to decline in the 1960s. As of 2023 it still existed as a nonprofit organization based in Westwood, Massachusetts.

The records of the Society from 1917-2005 are on file at the Schlesinger Library, Radcliffe Institute for Advanced Study, Harvard University. Other records are included in the Evelyn Shakir Collection at the Arab American National Museum Archives.

== Business ==
In the 1920s, Hannah and her brother Naseeb started a small apron factory in East Boston, where they were living at the time. After some initial success, they made the mistake of moving to downtown Boston, where the high rent drove them out of business. For the next twenty years she worked for other people. In 1944 she opened her own textile factory, Parkway Manufacturing in West Roxbury, Boston, which employed fifteen people and manufactured women's clothing for thirty years.

She retired at the age of 71 and died on April 22, 1990.

Shakir's daughter, Evelyn Shakir, was a pioneer in the field of Arab American literature. Evelyn Shakir included her mother's history with those of other Arab-American women in her scholarly work, Bint Arab: Arab and Arab American women in the United States.

== See also ==
- Woman's club movement
- Saturday Evening Girls
