= Girls' High School (Boston) =

Coordinates: 42°20′26.027″N 71°4′32.04″W

Location
- West Newton Street; Boston, Massachusetts; United States

Information
- Type: Public
- Established: September 1852
- Closed: 1981
- Campus: Urban
- Affiliation: Boston Public Schools

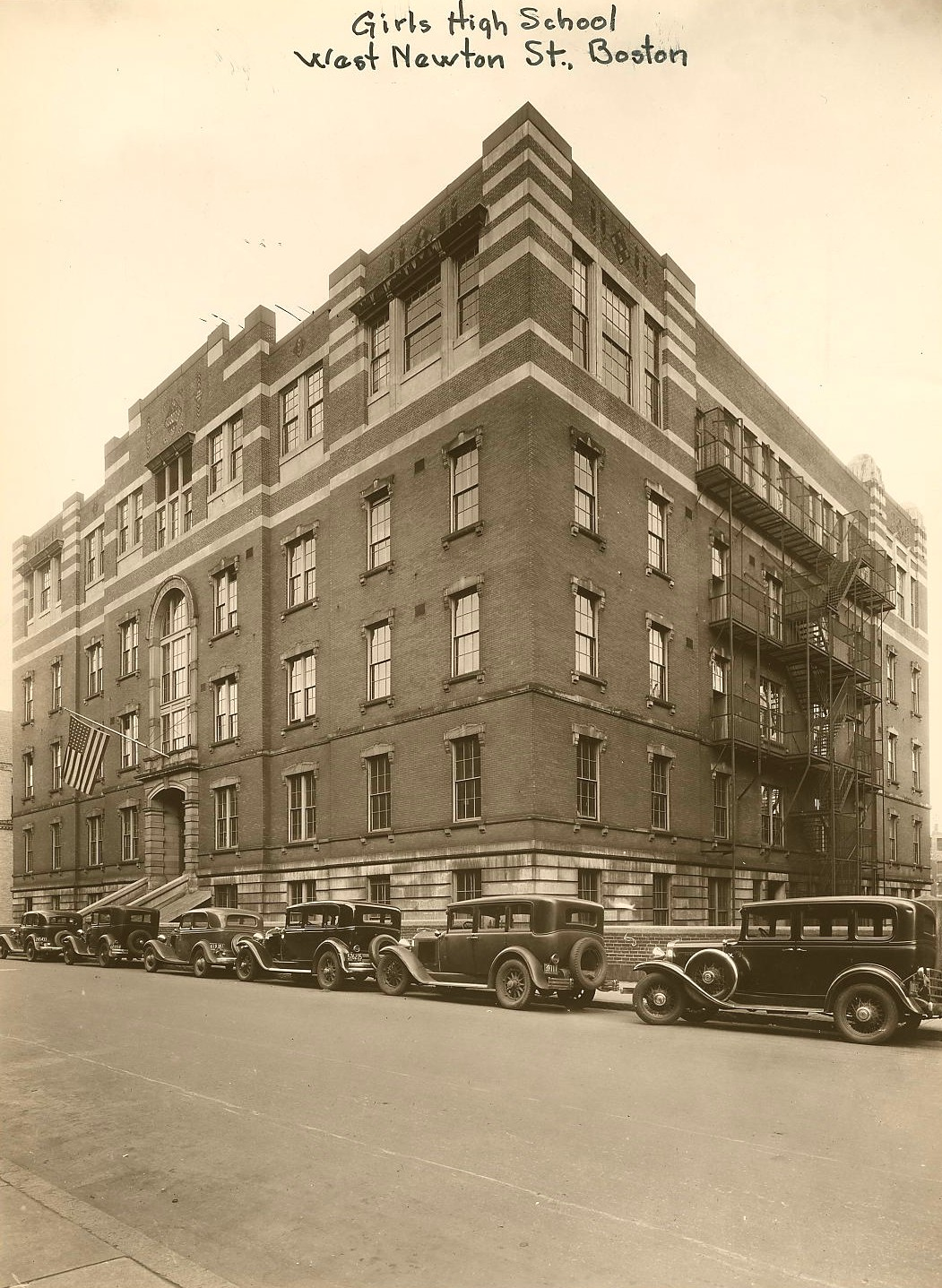
External view of the high school in the 1920s

Girls' High School is a defunct secondary school that was located at various times in the Downtown Boston, South End and Roxbury sections of Boston, Massachusetts. The first public high school for young women in the United States, it was founded in 1852 as the Normal School for girls to be trained as primary school teachers. It was initially located above a public library in the former Adams schoolhouse on Mason Street. In 1854, the school's name was changed to the Girls' High and Normal School.

In 1869, construction began for a purpose-built school building, located on Newton Street between Tremont and Shawmut Avenue. That building was designed for just under 1000 students, with 8 classrooms, 15 recitation rooms, 3 studios, chemical, physical, and botanical laboratories, and a hall, as well as facilities dedicated to the Girls' Latin School. This building was formally dedicated on April 19, 1871. By 1903, the high school's share of this space was described as insufficient in the Boston Globe.

The school became co–educational in the latter half of the 20th century. By spring 1974, the school housed 500 female students and 200 male students. That spring, the Boston School Committee voted to change the school's name to Roxbury High School. This name was the most popular among petitioning students.

Roxbury High closed in 1981, and the school building was later occupied by the Dearborn Middle School, now Dearborn STEM Academy.

== Notable alumnae ==
- Jennie Loitman Barron, attorney and judge (Class of 1907)
- Miriam Benjamin, schoolteacher and inventor (Class of 1881)
- Marcella Boveri, biologist and first woman to graduate from the Massachusetts Institute of Technology
- Harriet E. Caryl, teacher at Girls High School for 48 years (Class of 1855)
- Melnea Cass, civil rights activist
- Wilhelmina Marguerita Crosson, educator and school administrator
- Mildred Davenport, dancer and dance instructor
- Margaret Foley, suffragist
- Jessie G. Garnett, first African-American woman dentist in Boston
- Sophie Chantal Hart, professor of English at Wellesley College (Class of 1887)
- Anita Florence Hemmings, librarian, first African American woman to graduate from Vassar College
- Pauline Hopkins, novelist, journalist, playwright, historian, and editor
- Lillian A. Lewis, first African-American woman journalist in Boston (Class of 1886)
- Vera Mikol, journalist and researcher (Class of 1916)
- Ruth Roman, actress of film, stage, and television
- Helen C. White, professor of English at University of Wisconsin–Madison (Class of 1913)
- Olive B. White, writer, college professor and Dean of Women at Bradley University (Class of 1915)

== Heads of school ==
incomplete list

- Loring Lothrop, 1852–1856
- William H. Seavey, 1856–1868
- Ephraim Hunt, 1868–1872
- Samuel Eliot, 1872–1876
- Homer B. Sprague, 1876–1885
- John Tetlow, 1885–1907
- Albert Perry Walker, 1907–1911
- Myron W. Richardson, 1911–1925
- John E. Denham, 1925
- Raymond J. Gemmel, 1966
- Charles F. Ray, 1981

== Locations ==
- Mason Street, Downtown Boston
- 85 West Newton Street, South End
- 36 Winthrop Street, Roxbury
