= Wilhelmina Marguerita Crosson =

Wilhelmina Crosson
- Born: Wilhelmina Marguerita Crosson; April 26, 1900; Rutherford, New Jersey, U.S.
- Died: May 28, 1991 (aged 91); Boston, U.S.
- Occupation: Educator
- Known for: Pedagogy

Wilhelmina Marguerita Crosson (April 26, 1900 – May 28, 1991) was an educator and school administrator known for her innovative teaching methods. One of the first African-American female schoolteachers in Boston, she developed the city's first remedial reading program in 1935, and was an early advocate of black history education.

== Early life and education ==
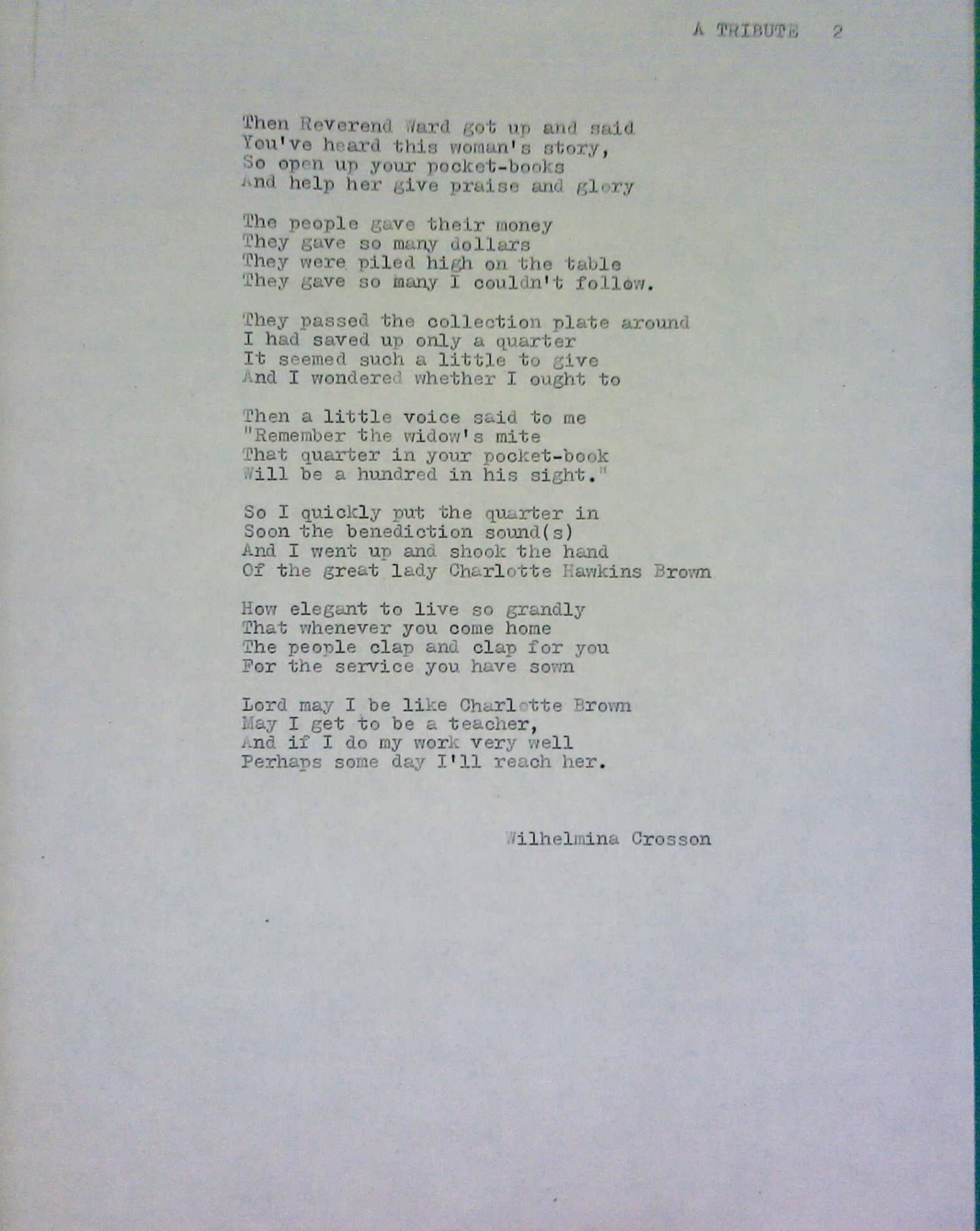
Wilhelmina Crosson poem

Wilhelmina Marguerita Crosson was born in Rutherford, New Jersey, on April 26, 1900, to Charles Tasker Crosson and Sallie Alice Davis Crosson. She was the fourth of nine children. In 1906 she moved with her family to Boston, where she attended the Hyde School and Girls' High School in Roxbury. She earned a B.S. degree in education at Boston Teachers College in 1934 and a master's degree in educational administration from Boston University in 1954.

== Career ==
Crosson began her career in 1920 at the Hyde School in Boston's North End, teaching remedial reading to the children of Italian immigrants. She was one of the first African-American women to teach in the Boston public schools.

One of the first American teachers to recognize the need for remedial reading classes, she developed Boston's first remedial reading program in 1935. Crosson's pioneering methods were so successful that administrators and other teachers were regularly sent to observe her classes, and she was invited to lecture on the subject.

In 1925, she founded the Aristo Club of Boston, an organization of black professional women who studied and taught black history and awarded scholarships to black children. The Boston school system began observing Negro History Week as a result of the Aristo Club's efforts.

In 1933, Crosson published a groundbreaking article in the Elementary English Review titled "The Negro in Children's Literature". It was the first article in a mainstream American teaching journal asking teachers to celebrate African-American culture, and the first article by a self-described "Negro" author to appear in the journal.

In the article Crosson recommends the teaching of "Negro literature" (which she defines as works by, for, and about black people), reasoning that black children should not be deprived of the literature of their own race, and that all children would benefit from the experience:

Surely, it is important for the American schoolchild to know something about the literature of this black race which came to America a little over three hundred years ago, and has become an important and integral part of this nation.

She recommended the teaching of African-American history, presenting the achievements of African Americans such as Harriet Tubman alongside those of whites, proposing that this would "...make the Negro child strive to lift his race to higher levels, and the white child feel that the Negro race has played its part in the making of America."

In 1945, she took a sabbatical to study intercultural education in Mexico's public schools for the Association for the Study of Negro Life and History. Crosson was one of the few women to be given a field assignment for the ASNLH in those days, and was later elected to its executive council. Upon her return, she began teaching at the all-black Hyde School in Roxbury, where she made many changes in the curriculum and inspired a love of reading in her students. She also volunteered as a Sunday school teacher at the Twelfth Baptist Church, and taught black history lessons on Saturdays.

Crosson became president of the Palmer Memorial Institute, an all-black preparatory school in Sedalia, North Carolina, in 1952. She established many new programs at the school and obtained funding from the government and the Ford Foundation. She retired in 1966. In 1968 she worked with North Carolina College developing a training program for Peace Corps volunteers on assignment in Liberia. In 1970 she returned to Boston, where she did volunteer work in homeless shelters and as a tutor. She died at the age of 91 at her home in the South End of Boston.

== Publications ==
- Crosson, Wilhelmina M. (1933). "The Negro in Children's Literature". The Elementary English Review. 10 (10). National Council of Teachers of English: 249–255. JSTOR 41381843.
- Crosson, Wilhelmina M. (1936). "A Popular Subject". The Elementary English Review. 13 (8). National Council of Teachers of English: 283–286. JSTOR 41383038.
- Crosson, Wilhelmina M. (1940). "Florence Crannell Means". The Elementary English Review. 17 (8). National Council of Teachers of English: 321–324, 326. JSTOR 41383300.
- "Wilhelmina M. Crosson Reports on Intercultural Education in Mexico". Negro History Bulletin. X: 55–60, 68–71. December 1946.

== Honors and awards ==
- Honored by the Florida Association of Colored Women, 1960
- Mrs. W. V. S. Tubman award, 1964
- Sojourner Truth award, Boston and Vicinity Negro Business and Professional Women's Clubs, 1969
- Dolly Madison award, Greensboro, North Carolina Chamber of Commerce, 1971
- Boston Afro-American Griot Award, Boston College, 1985
- Honored by Action for Boston Community Development, 1985
- Wilhelmina M. Crosson Scholarship fund, Twelfth Baptist Church, Boston, 1991
- She is mentioned in connection with the League of Women for Community Service on the Boston Women's Heritage Trail.
