= Lilla G. Frederick =

- Died: 2005
- Occupations: Educational administrator and community activist

Lilla G. Frederick was an educational administrator and community activist of the Grove Hall neighborhood in Boston.

Frederick was born in Kingston, Jamaica. She moved to Boston and earned a bachelor's degree in business administration from Northeastern University. She also earned a master's degree from Lesley University.

Frederick served as the president of Project RIGHT, a community-based project in Dorchester and Roxbury, for 30 years. She is chairperson in memoriam. She was also a supporter of the Boston Caribbean Foundation, the Grove Hall Elder Housing Advocacy Group, a member of the Action for Boston Community Development Family Service Center (Roxbury), a member of the Blue Hill Avenue Initiative Task Force and was a volunteer in the Boston Public Schools districts.

Frederick was the lead on the development of a middle school in Grove Hall. The New Boston Pilot Middle School was named after her following her death in 2005.

Frederick's work has been recognized by the United States Department of Justice, Commonwealth of Massachusetts Governor's Council and City of Boston Resident Association. In 2023, she was recognized as one of "Boston’s most admired, beloved, and successful Black Women leaders" by the Black Women Lead project.
