= Jessie G. Garnett =

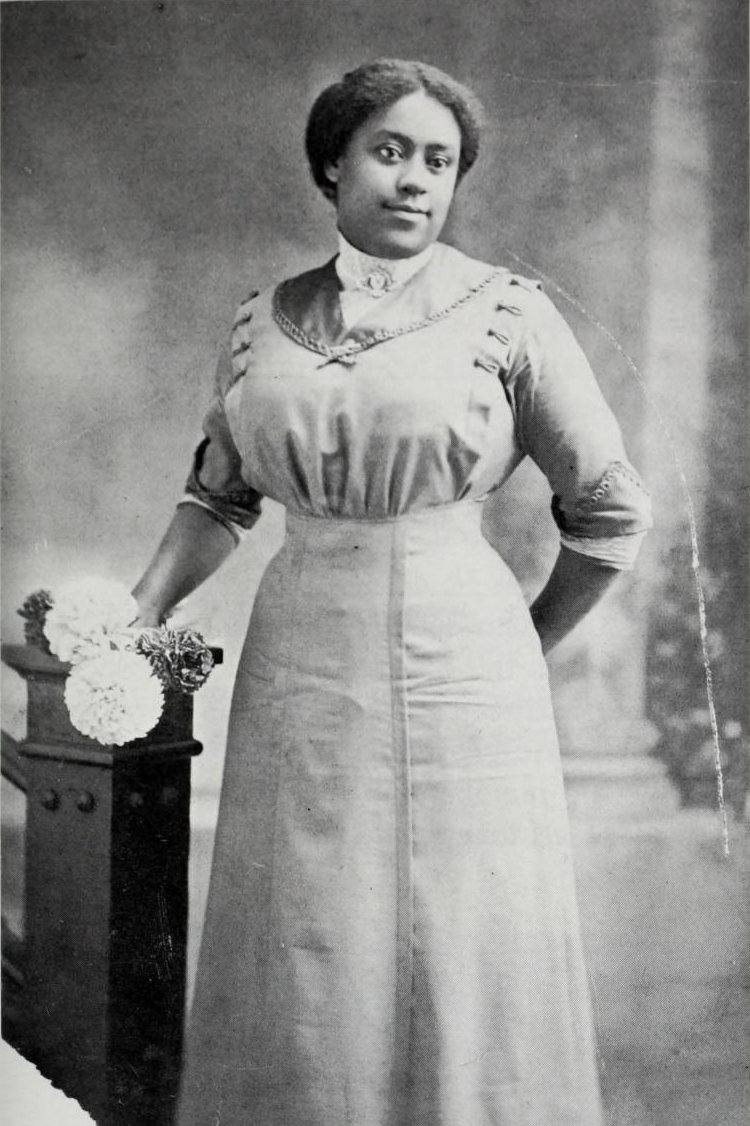
- Born: Jessie Katherine Gideon; April 20, 1897; Liverpool, Nova Scotia
- Died: September 5, 1976 (aged 79); Roxbury, Boston
- Other name: Jessie K. Garnett
- Education: Tufts University; Tufts University School of Dental Medicine
- Spouse: Robert Charles Garnett
- Children: 2

Jessie G. Garnett (1897-1976) was Boston's first black woman dentist, and the first black woman to graduate from the Tufts University School of Dental Medicine.

== Early life and education ==
She was born in Liverpool, Nova Scotia, in 1897. Her mother was a seamstress; her father died when she was a young child. At age eleven, she moved with her mother, two older sisters, and younger brother to the Roxbury neighborhood of Boston, where she attended Girls' High School. She then studied at Tufts University and the Tufts University School of Dental Medicine, graduating in 1919. She was the first black woman to graduate from the Tufts Dental School, and the only woman in her graduating class.

When she first enrolled in the dental school, she later recalled, the dean thought there must have been a mistake. After checking to make sure she had indeed been accepted, he warned her, "You'll have to find your own patients, you know," to which she replied, "That will be just fine with me."

== Career ==
Dr. Garnett opened her first dental office at the corner of Tremont and Camden Streets in Lower Roxbury. Business was slow for the first few years. Later she recalled, "When I first started, patients came to the office and saw me. They asked for the dentist. 'I'm the dentist,' I said." After moving to Columbus Avenue for several years, she moved her home and practice to 80 Munroe Street, where she remained for the rest of her career. In 1969, after practicing for nearly 50 years, she was forced to retire due to arthritis in her hands.

Dr. Garnett co-founded the Psi Omega chapter of the Alpha Kappa Alpha sorority in 1926. She was a member of the NAACP and the Urban League, and served on the boards of the Boston YWCA, Freedom House, and St. Mark's Congregational Church in Roxbury.

== Personal life and legacy ==
In 1920 she married Robert Charles Garnett, a Boston police officer at Station 5. The couple had two children and four grandchildren.

Garnett died on September 1, 1976, while attending church services. The Dr. Jessie Garnett-Dr. Mary Thompson Scholarship was established by the Psi Omega chapter of the Alpha Kappa Alpha sorority at Tufts Dental School later that year. (Mary Thompson was a fellow Tufts Dental School alumnus and noted humanitarian.)

Garnett's former home and office at 80 Munroe Street was honored with a plaque by the Boston Heritage Guild in 2009, and is a stop on the Boston Women's Heritage Trail.
