= Jennie Loitman Barron =

American judge

Jennie L. Barron

Associate Justice of the Massachusetts Superior Court
- In office 1959–1969

Associate Justice of the Boston Municipal Court
- In office 1937–1957

Personal details
- Born: Jennie Deana Loitman; October 12, 1891 Boston, Massachusetts
- Died: March 28, 1969 (aged 77)
- Spouse: Samuel Barron Jr. (m. 1918)
- Children: 3
- Education: Boston University

Jennie Deana Loitman Barron (October 12, 1891 – March 28, 1969) was an American suffragist, lawyer, and judge. She was the first woman to present evidence to a Grand Jury in Massachusetts and the first to prosecute major criminal cases. She was the first woman judge appointed for life to the Municipal Court in Boston (1937), and the first woman appointed to the Massachusetts Superior Court (1959).

== Family and education ==
Loitman was born in Boston to Belarusian Jewish immigrants Morris (Mosche) Loitman, an insurance executive, and Fannie (Feige) Kastleman from Zaslawye. She attended Girls' High School, graduating as valedictorian at 15. She received a B.A. and a law degree from Boston University, and opened her own law practice after graduating in 1914.

In 1918, she married fellow lawyer Samuel Barron Jr., and they practiced together as Barron and Barron. The couple had three daughters: Erma Barron Wernick (b. 1919), Deborah Barron Blazar (1923–1956), and Joy Barron Rachlin (b. 1931).

== Suffrage and other political work ==
Jennie Loitman became interested in suffrage while a college student. She was the first president of the Boston University College Equal Suffrage Organization. She was invited by Maud Wood Park to speak at open-air meetings of the Boston Equal Suffrage Association for Good Government. In 1917, she was a street-corner speaker in New York City's suffrage campaign. Once suffrage was granted, Barron worked with the League of Women Voters to address irregular marriage and divorce laws across the country. She wrote the League's official statement arguing for women to serve on juries. She was elected to the Boston School Committee from 1926 to 1929, the first mother to serve.

== Legal work ==
Barron opened her own law practice in Boston after being admitted to the Massachusetts bar in 1914. Unlike many other suffragists, she supported America's involvement in World War I and became the executive secretary of the Liberty Loan Bond Committee.

Barron was an early president of the Massachusetts Association of Women Lawyers. In 1918 she organized a campaign to allow women to become notaries. She was an assistant Massachusetts Attorney General from 1934 to 1935. In 1937 she was named associate justice of the Boston Municipal Court, and served for twenty years. In 1959 Barron became an associate justice of the Massachusetts Superior Court, where she served until her death in 1969.

Barron was also the first female United States delegate to the United Nations Congress on Crime and Juvenile Delinquency.

She is remembered on the Boston Women's Heritage Trail.
