= Adelaide Cole Chase =

American painter (1868–1944)

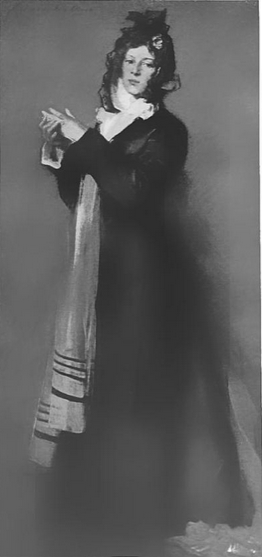
The Portrait of a Lady, by Adelaide Cole Chase

Adelaide Cole Chase (Boston, MA, 1868–1944, Gloucester, MA) was an American painter of portraits and still lifes. She was a member of the Art Students' Association.

== Biography ==
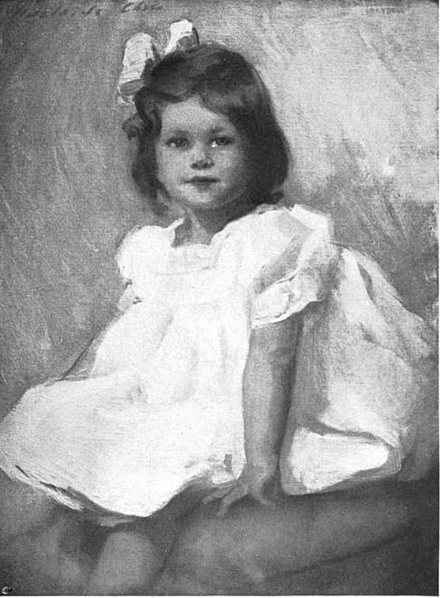
"A Portrait", by Adelaide Cole Chase

Born in Boston, Massachusetts, she was a daughter of J. Foxcroft Cole, the landscape painter, and of Irma de Pelgrom, a Belgian pianist. Chase traveled extensively with her parents in Europe and the American West as a young girl. At the age of 10, she posed for Winslow Homer, who was a good friend of her father.

Her first instruction in drawing and painting was from her father. As a girl she had the advantage of the instruction of Frederic Porter Vinton. Chase studied at the School of the Museum of Fine Arts under Edmund C. Tarbell and Frank Weston Benson, in Paris under Jean-Paul Laurens and Carolus-Duran.

Professionally, she has had an almost exclusive interest in the painting of portraits. Twenty-five examples of her portrait work were exhibited in the spring of 1901 at Doll & Richards's in Boston, and these gave the impression of accomplished technical work and a refined and distinguished style. Chase has also exhibited at the Society of American Artists.

Among those whose portraits she has painted are Helen F. Smith, Dean of Wells College, and Madam Chase (a charming portrait of old age). She was equally successful with portraits of children, young people, and those of older years, and with sitters of either sex. Her manner was firm and direct, and her portraits have the artistic value of being interesting apart from the personality of the subject.

A portrait called a "Woman with a Muff," exhibited at the exhibition of the Society of American Artists, in New York City, was praised. At the 1904 exhibition of the Philadelphia Academy, Chase exhibited a portrait of children, Constance and Gordon Worcester, of which Arthur Hoeber wrote: "She has painted them easily, with deftness and feeling, and apparently caught their character and the delicacy of infancy." She also won silver medals at the St. Louis World's Fair in 1904 and the Panama-Pacific International Exposition in San Francisco in 1915. In 1960, she became an associate member of the National Academy of Design.

She married William Chester Chase, an architect of Boston in 1892.
