= Julia Harrington Duff =

American educator and community leader (1859–1932)

Julia Harrington Duff (November 30, 1859 – 1932) was an American educator and community leader, known as the first Irish-American woman to serve on the Boston School Committee.

== Early life ==
Julia Elizabeth Harrington was born in Charlestown, Massachusetts, the eldest of her parents' seven children. Her father, John Harrington, a hatter, was from Ireland (he was known as Harrington the Hatter); her mother Mary Agnes Noonan Harrington was American-born. Julia Harrington attended Boston Girls' High School and graduated from the Boston Normal School in 1878. Her brother Arthur Harrington was a lawyer who served in the Massachusetts legislature.

== Career ==
After normal school, Julia Harrington taught school in Boston for fourteen years, until marriage disqualified her from continuing that employment. In 1901, she was elected to the Boston School Committee, where she served for four years, and was the first Irish Catholic woman to hold a seat on the committee. She worked for equal employment opportunities for local, often Irish Catholic teachers in Boston schools, with the slogan "Boston Schools for Boston Girls". She also supported school sports for girls, at a time when many educationists were opposed to the idea. "The girl who goes into athletics is likely to be equally quick mentally," she explained. "With proper safeguards for their health, I believe school athletics to be an excellent thing for schoolgirls." She had a reputation as a forceful, argumentative committee member. Her husband made a practice of being present at all the school board meetings to "join in the fight" when she was quarrelling.

Julia Harrington Duff lost her seat on the school board in 1905 when its membership was reduced from 24 seats to five; she ran again for the board in 1906, (and again in 1907), saying "I shall run not as a representative of any race or creed, but as a representative of the 60,000 mothers of children in the city of Boston." In 1910, she supported a boycott of the Boston opera house to express disapproval for recently divorced Lina Cavalieri.

== Personal life ==
Julia Harrington married John Duff, a medical doctor educated at Harvard and the Massachusetts Institute of Technology. They had three children. She died in 1932, aged 73 years. Her home is part of the Boston Women's Heritage Trail in Charlestown.

Her son Paul Harrington Duff became a noted surgeon in Boston. His son, Brian Barnett Duff, was a U. S. federal judge in Illinois. Her great-granddaughter, Eileen Duff, has served on the Massachusetts Governor's Council since 2012.

Many of her grandchildren, great-grandchildren, and great-great-grandchildren have gone on to be public school teachers.

A large number of the Duff family still reside in New England.
