= Ruby Foo =

American Chinese restaurant pioneer

- Born: Ruby Foo; 1904; San Francisco, U.S.
- Died: March 16, 1950 (aged 45–46); Jamaicaway, Boston, U.S.
- Known for: Restaurateur

Ruby Foo Wong (1904 – 1950), better known as Ruby Foo, was a restaurateur who founded the historic Ruby Foo's Den in Boston in 1929. One of the earliest Chinese-American women restaurant owners, she went on to open similar restaurants in New York City, Miami, Washington, D.C., Montreal, and Providence.

== Biography ==
Ruby Foo was born in San Francisco in 1904. In 1923, she moved to Boston, where she started a one-room restaurant in Chinatown. The venture was a success, and in 1929 she opened Ruby Foo's Den, a restaurant and nightclub, at 6 Hudson Street. Billed as "Chinatown's smartest restaurant", the "Den" was the first known Chinese restaurant in the U.S. to attract a large non-Chinese clientele. In the 1930s and 40s it was a nationally known gathering place for famous athletes, actors, and other celebrities. It became one of the first Boston restaurants to expand into other cities when Foo lent her name to similar establishments in New York City, Miami, Washington D.C., Providence, and Montreal. Foo was a mentor to many aspiring chefs in the Boston area.

Foo was married three times and had two children, Earl and Doris Shong. Her third husband was William Wong. According to the Boston Globe, after seeing the famous "Bloody Saturday" photograph of a crying baby in a bombed-out Shanghai railway station, she arranged to have the baby brought to the U.S., where she adopted him in 1938, naming him Ronald.

Foo died of a heart attack in her Jamaicaway home on March 16, 1950, aged 42. Her funeral was attended by prominent city and state officials, as well as "stage, screen, and radio personalities". She is commemorated on the Boston Women's Heritage Trail.
