= Denison House (Boston) =

Coordinates: 42.3486388°N 71.0616003°W

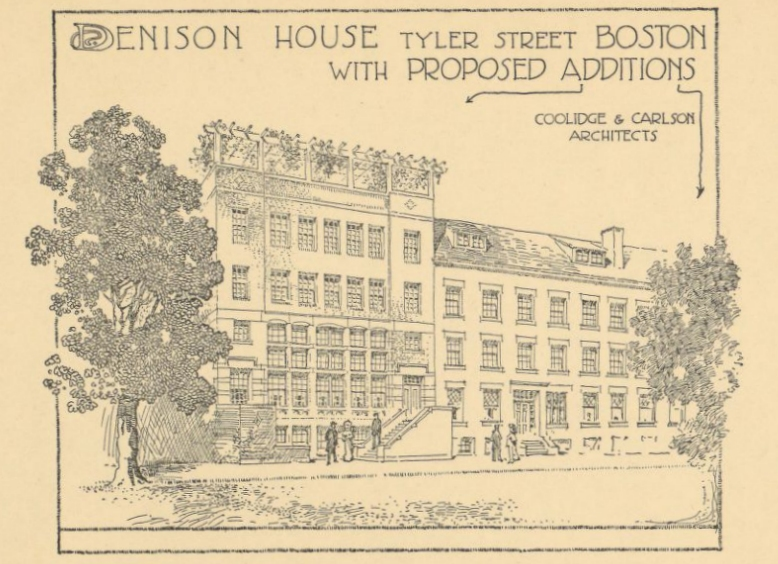
Illustration from the Denison House Annual Report for the Year Ending October 1st, 1913

Denison House was a woman-run settlement house in Boston's old South Cove neighborhood. Founded in 1892 by the College Settlements Association, it provided a variety of social and educational services to neighborhood residents, most of whom were immigrants. Several notable women worked there, including Nobel Prize winner Emily Greene Balch, labor organizer Mary Kenney O'Sullivan, and pioneering aviator Amelia Earhart. The original site at 93 Tyler Street is a stop on the Boston Women's Heritage Trail.

== History ==
=== Founding ===
Denison House was established in 1892, donated by Cornelia Warren, as one of the earliest branches of the College Settlements Association. (Note: Several sources claim that Denison House was one of the first settlement houses in the United States. According to the Harvard University Library, however, there were over 400 settlement houses in the U.S. by 1890. In her master's thesis, Heather Capitanio specifies that Denison House was "the third college settlement of its kind in the United States".) The CSA had been founded in 1887 by a small group of Wellesley College faculty and alumnae including noted pacifist Emily Greene Balch, labor organizer Vida Scudder, and the writer and college professor Katharine Lee Bates. It was named for Edward Denison, an English social reformer who advocated living among the poor. Balch was an admirer of Jane Addams, whom she had met at an Ethical Culture Society gathering; Denison House was modeled after Addams's Hull House in Chicago. Its mission was to provide Boston's poor with social services and education, not only for philanthropic purposes but to break down class barriers. The women hoped that bringing people of different backgrounds together under one roof would further the purpose of democracy, which they defined as "a free flowing life between group and group".

The original Denison House was located at 93 Tyler Street, a red brick row house across from the old Josiah Quincy School. It quickly outgrew that space, and the adjoining house was added on. By the 1920s it occupied five row houses with a shared entrance at number 93. Its first head resident was Balch herself, who served there briefly before returning to academia.

=== 1893–1912 ===
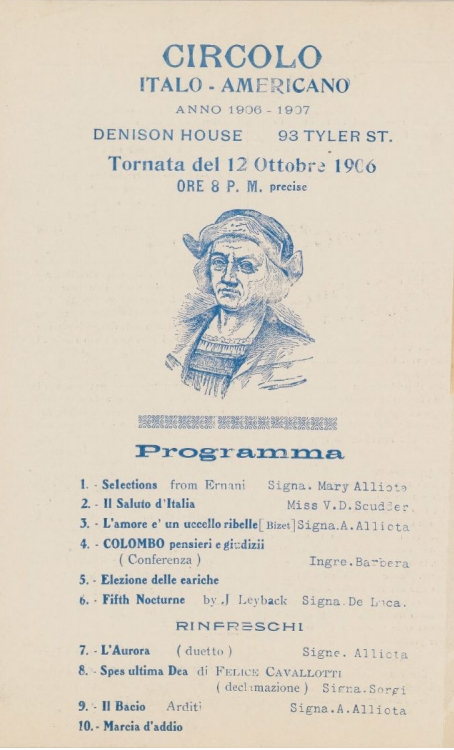
Circolo Italo-Americano, an Italian-American group, held cultural events at Denison House.

Balch was replaced as head resident by Helena Dudley, who served from 1893 to 1912. Arriving during the Panic of 1893, Dudley immediately set to work organizing the house as a relief agency that could distribute such basic necessities as milk and coal. Under her direction, Denison House became an important neighborhood center, offering classes in nursing, English literature, crafts, cooking, and carpentry, as well as sports and a summer camp for children, and clubs for adults. It had a library, a gymnasium, and a clinic. Later, Dudley cooperated with Robert Archey Woods and other residents of South End House—Boston's first settlement house, located just a few blocks away—to hold art exhibitions, conduct housing investigations, and campaign for public bathhouses and gymnasiums.

Local men and women who frequented Denison House, most of whom were immigrants, were encouraged to celebrate their heritage through cultural festivals and craft exhibitions. One such exhibition took place at the Pennsylvania Museum and School of Industrial Art in 1917. On display was "the work of Italian, Syrian, Greek and Armenian craftsmen and craftswomen, in silver, leather, linen, silk embroideries, etc., from old designs copied in part from treasure pieces in palaces, museums and private collections in Europe and America." The exhibition was reportedly a great success, with many of the items being sold. The teenaged boys of the Denison House dramatic club performed Shakespearean plays to raise funds for renovations, and received encouraging reviews in the Boston Globe.

Among the early residents of Denison House was the labor organizer Mary Kenney O'Sullivan, who lived there for several years in the 1890s with her husband and three children. O'Sullivan, Dudley, and Scudder were among the founding members of the Women's Trade Union League in 1903. Mary Morton Kehew, president of the Women's Educational and Industrial Union, was treasurer of Denison House in the late 1890s, and the Christian Socialist writer W. D. P. Bliss gave a speech there in 1898. In an address at Wesleyan Hall, Dudley said that the college women had learned, through their work at the settlement house, "of the conditions which press upon the wage earners. We have found women making shirts for 37 and a half cents a dozen...and it is because of this knowledge that we have become interested in trade unions."

During Dudley's tenure several trade unions met regularly at Denison House, and in 1904 she hosted Catherine Breshkovsky, "grandmother of the Russian Revolution", at Denison House for several weeks. In 1912 Dudley and O'Sullivan paid the bail of $500 each for Joseph Ettor and Arturo Giovannitti, leaders of the 1912 Lawrence textile strike who had been arrested on trumped-up charges. Another Denison House worker, Vida Scudder, also supported the Lawrence strikers, and gave a widely publicized speech at a strike meeting. Wealthy donors were troubled by the house's connections to organized labor, and as fundraising became increasingly difficult, both Dudley and Scudder were forced to resign their positions.

=== 1912–1942 ===
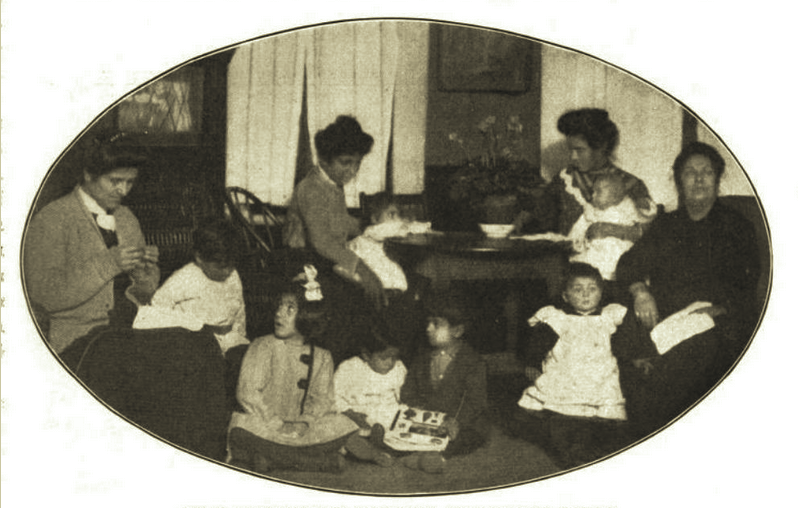
Folk handicraft workers at Denison House (1915)

Before she became a famous aviator, Amelia Earhart was a social worker at Denison House. She was hired in 1926 and in the fall of 1927 became a full-time staffer at 93 Tyler street, where she worked until her historic flight in the Friendship in June 1928. Commuting from Medford, Massachusetts in her yellow Kissel Speedster, she worked as a teacher and home visitor during the week, and spent her weekends flying. By that time the neighborhood was home to an increasing number of Chinese immigrants. Earhart was in charge of adult education, and supervised the girls' program. She organized women's clubs, such as the Syrian Mothers Club, and coached girls' basketball and fencing. In 1927 she flew over Boston and Cambridge, dropping leaflets to advertise a Denison House fundraiser. The following year she represented Denison House at the conference of the National Federation of Settlements, held in Boston, where she impressed leading members as "one of the most promising social workers of her generation".

=== 1942–present ===
In 1942, Denison House relocated to Dorchester, where it occupied several local buildings before moving into the former Howard Avenue School in 1949. In 1965 it merged with Little House, Dorchester House, and the Columbia Point Youth Center to form the Federated Dorchester Neighborhood Houses (FDNH), which became College Bound Dorchester in 2010. The original site on Tyler Street, now occupied by apartment buildings, is a stop on the Chinatown/South Cove walk of the Boston Women's Heritage Trail.

== Influence ==
Mary Kingsbury Simkhovitch, a city planner and social worker, met Helena Dudley and visited Denison House while living in Boston. The experience had a lasting influence on Simkhovitch; in 1902, she founded Greenwich House, a New York City settlement house which is still in operation today.

The poet Kahlil Gibran and his younger relative, the sculptor Kahlil Gibran, lived in the South End as children and were frequent visitors to Denison House. It was there that the elder Gibran was introduced to the avant-garde Boston artist, photographer, and publisher Fred Holland Day, who encouraged him in his creative endeavors. The younger Gibran later recalled seeing Amelia Earhart there, dressed in jodhpurs and driving her bright yellow car.

== See also ==
- Settlement and community houses in the United States
