= Salem Women's Heritage Trail =

The Salem Women's Heritage Trail was created in 2000 by local historians, curators, librarians, and interested citizens to remember the women who have contributed to the development of Salem, Massachusetts for over four centuries since colonial times and far beyond when Native Americans occupied "Naumkeag," as Salem was originally called. Salem is known the world over for the Salem Witch Trials of 1692, but this walking trail discusses many more women's stories.

A guidebook of this self-guided walk was published in 2000 by local author Bonnie Hurd Smith under the auspices of the Salem Chamber of Commerce. The trail's kick-off event took place at The House of the Seven Gables, a site on the trail, and featured speeches by Nancy Harrington, the president of Salem State College (Harrington, the first woman president of the college, is on the trail), and trolley tours of the trail with Salem Trolley.

== Women, subjects, and organizations on the Trail ==
Some of the women featured on the trail include the famous "Peabody Sisters of Salem," Elizabeth, Mary, and Sophia, who were the subjects of Megan Marshall's 2005 award-winning book. Also on the trail are Caroline Emmerton and Caroline Plummer, two of Salem's leading philanthropists. Susan Burley, a supporter of Nathaniel Hawthorne and literary "force" is featured. Sarah Parker Remond, the great abolitionist speaker, is included along with the African American educator Charlotte Forten and artists Louisa Lander and Sarah W. Symonds. Sarah Parker Remond utilized the smuggling tunnels in town that led out of her father's catering business in Hamilton hall to support the Underground Railroad.

Subjects addressed on the trail include suffrage, abolition, education, the arts, business, philanthropy, historic preservation, Native American rights, and the Salem Witch Trails.

Organizations include the Salem Female Anti-Slavery Society, the Salem Woman Suffrage Club, the Salem Lyceum Society, and the Salem Women's Indian Association.

A number of the women on the Salem trail have a presence on the Boston Women's Heritage Trail, and vice versa. Bostonian Lucy Stone spoke in Salem at Lyceum Hall against slavery and on behalf of woman suffrage. Salem's Sarah Parker Remond's first act of public resistance against racism took place in Boston at the Howard Athenaeum.

Both the Salem and Boston trails are featured in the National Collaborative of Women's History Sites guidebook and website which include a section on walking trails throughout the United States.

== Changes in 2009 ==
In 2009, the Salem Women's Heritage Trail guidebook evolved into a website with information from the guidebook and new additions including the 2005 election of Salem's first woman mayor, Kimberley Driscoll.
