= Mary Crease Sears =

American bookbinder and cover designer

- Born: August 18, 1859; Watertown, Massachusetts
- Died: 1938 (aged 78–79); Boston, Massachusetts

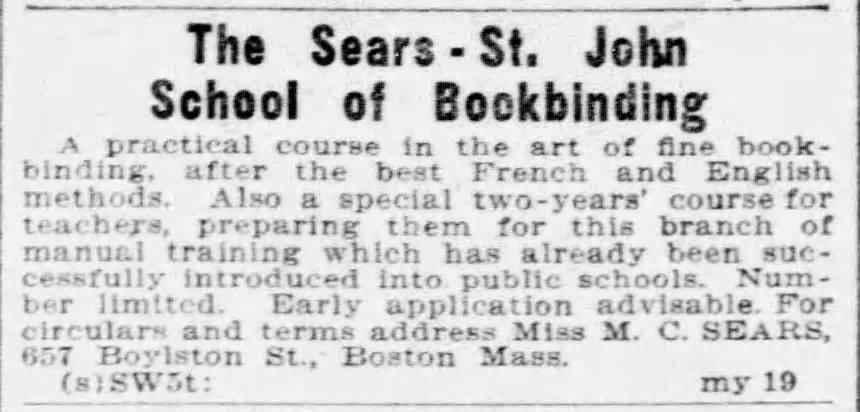
Ad for The Sears - St. John School of Bookbinding in Boston, 1906

Mary Crease Sears (1859 – 1938) was an American bookbinder and cover designer, known for her Arts and Crafts style work.

Sears was born in Watertown, Massachusetts on August 18, 1859. She attended the School of the Museum of Fine Arts, Boston and also studied book making in France and Britain. In Europe she met fellow artist Agnes St. John who Sears would go on the collaborate with for many years.

One of her bound books was commissioned for Isabella Stewart Gardner and is now in the Isabella Stewart Gardner Museum collection. Sears was a member of The Society of Arts and Crafts of Boston, elected as a "Master Craftsmen" in 1904. The same year she exhibited her work at the St. Louis World's Fair where she won a gold medal. Her work was also exhibited at the 1930 Boston Tercentenary Fine Arts and Crafts Exhibition. Case was also a member of the Copley Society of Art.

While primarily known for her book covers and bindry, Sears designed a stained glass window for The Woman's Building at the 1893 Chicago World's Fair It was donated to the building by the Boston Women's Educational and Industrial Union (WEIU). Entitled Seal of Boston the window was placed in the Boston office of the WEIU after the Fair closed.

Sears died in 1938 in Boston.
