= Melnea Cass =

American social activist

Melnea Agnes Cass
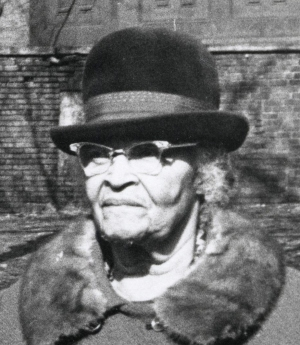
- Melnea Cass
- Born: Melnea Agnes Jones; June 16, 1896
- Died: December 16, 1978 (aged 82)
- Other name: First lady of Roxbury
- Occupation: Social activist
- Spouse: Marshall Cass (m. 1917; died in 1958)

Melnea Agnes Cass (née Jones; June 16, 1896 – December 16, 1978) was an American community and civil rights activist. She was deeply involved in many community projects and volunteer groups in the South End and Roxbury neighborhoods of Boston and helped found the Boston local of the Brotherhood of Sleeping Car Porters. She was active in the fight to desegregate Boston public schools, as a board member and as president of the Boston chapter of the National Association for the Advancement of Colored People (NAACP). As a young woman, Cass also assisted women with voter registration after the passage of the Nineteenth Amendment. She was affectionately known as the "First Lady of Roxbury."

== Early life ==
Cass's father was a janitor and her mother a domestic worker. The family moved to the South End of Boston when Cass was five years old from Richmond, Virginia. When Cass was eight, her mother died. Thereafter, she and her sisters were raised by their father and their Aunt Ella, who, as Cass said, "stepped in as a second mother." After a few years their aunt moved the girls to Newburyport, Massachusetts, and placed them in the care of Amy Smith.

Cass began her education in the Boston public schools. After graduating from elementary school in Newburyport, she attended Girls' High School in Boston for one year. Her aunt then enrolled her in St. Frances de Sales Convent School, a Catholic school for black and Indian girls in Rock Castle, Virginia. Cass graduated in 1914 as valedictorian of her class. She returned to Boston to the home that her Aunt Ella had established for the girls.

Cass looked for work in retail, but finding few opportunities for blacks in Boston, she was instead forced into “domestic” work. She did this type of work until her marriage to Marshall Cass, in December 1917. While her husband was in the service, their first child, Marshall, was born. After his return from the war, they had two other children, Marianne and Melanie. Her husband died in 1958.

Cass became involved in community projects. She helped to organize people to register to vote after the Nineteenth Amendment was ratified in 1920. Cass organized black women to cast their first vote. She was involved in women's suffrage activities for the rest of her life. As a young woman, she attended William Monroe Trotter's lectures and protest meetings and was a faithful reader of the Boston Guardian.

== Career ==
It was in the 1930s that Melnea Cass began a lifetime of volunteer work on the local, state, and national level. She first contributed her services to the Robert Gould Shaw House, a settlement house and community center. She was the founder of the Kindergarten Mothers. Her community activities over the years were numerous and varied: Pansy Embroidery Club, Harriet Tubman Mothers' Club, and the Sojourner Truth Club, worked in the Northeastern Region of the National Association of Colored Women's Clubs as a secretary, helped form the Boston local of the Brotherhood of Sleeping Car Porters to name a few. During World War II she was one of the organizers of Women In Community Service, which later became Boston's sponsor of the Job Corps. In 1949 she was a founder and charter member of Freedom House, which was conceived by Muriel and Otto Snowden. A year later, Boston Mayor John Collins appointed her as the only female charter member to Action for Boston Community Development (ABCD), which assisted people who lost their homes to ‘urban renewal’ efforts. From 1962 to 1964, Cass was president of the Boston branch of the National Association for the Advancement of Colored People (NAACP). From 1975 to 1976, Cass was chairperson for the Massachusetts Advisory Committee for the Elderly.

In 1933, William Monroe Trotter organized a demonstration urging African-American employers to hire African-American workers. Melnea Cass participated; it was her first demonstration.

== Legacy ==
Melnea Cass Boulevard in Boston's Roxbury neighborhood bears her name along with the Massachusetts Department of Conservation and Recreation's (DCR) Melnea A. Cass Swimming Pool and Indoor Recreation Arena dedicated by Gov. John Volpe. She was honored by then-Massachusetts Attorney General, Edward W. Brooke, on May 22, 1966, which was declared Melnea Cass Day.

She received honorary doctorates from Northeastern University (June 15, 1969), Simmons College (May 15, 1971), and Boston College (1975).

Melnea Cass died in 1978. She is commemorated on the Boston Women's Heritage Trail.

== See also ==
- History of African Americans in Boston
