= Mary Draper =

American revolutionary heroine (1719–1810)

- Born: Mary Aldis (Note: Her maiden name is also spelled Addis.); April 4, 1719; Dedham, Massachusetts
- Died: November 20, 1810 (aged 91); Dedham, Massachusetts
- Other names: Mary Allen
- Known for: Providing food, medical care, and ammunition during the American Revolutionary War
- Spouse(s): Abel Allen (m. 1739), Moses Draper (m. 1743)

Mary Aldis Draper (April 4, 1719 – November 20, 1810) is known for the help she gave members of the Continental Army during the American Revolution.

== Personal life ==
Mary Aldis, born April 4, 1719 in Dedham, Massachusetts, was the daughter of Nathan Aldis and Mary Chickering. She married Abel Allen on March 26, 1739 in Boston, becoming Mary Allen, and then later widow Allen. On November 26, 1743, Mary Allen married Moses Draper (1721–1775), becoming Mary Draper. The Drapers lived on a successful farm and dairy, which was on the border of Dedham and Roxbury. The house is in Roxbury, but she worshipped and frequented Dedham. (Note: The large house was likely built in 1653 and was razed by a fire, along with outbuildings, in 1870.) Moses died on January 21, 1775.

Draper had one daughter and five sons. At the time of the war, she had grown children, including Moses who was 31, and a son age 13. Moses, her eldest son who was a husband and a father, fought in the war. Moses assembled with other men at Roxbury Neck. He was a second lieutenant of the first company of the Roxbury minute men, led by Captain Moses Whiting. In addition to her oldest and youngest sons, (Note: Logan states that Draper helped her husband get ready for the war ("She exhorted her husband to lose no time in hastening to the scene of the action"), but he died January 25, 1775. Logan also said that she helped her sixteen-year-old son get ready to go fight with other patriots in the war, but according to the Dedham Historical Society her youngest son was age 13.) she had a daughter, Kate. One of her sons, David, married Rebecca Healy at some point.

== Battles of Lexington and Concord ==
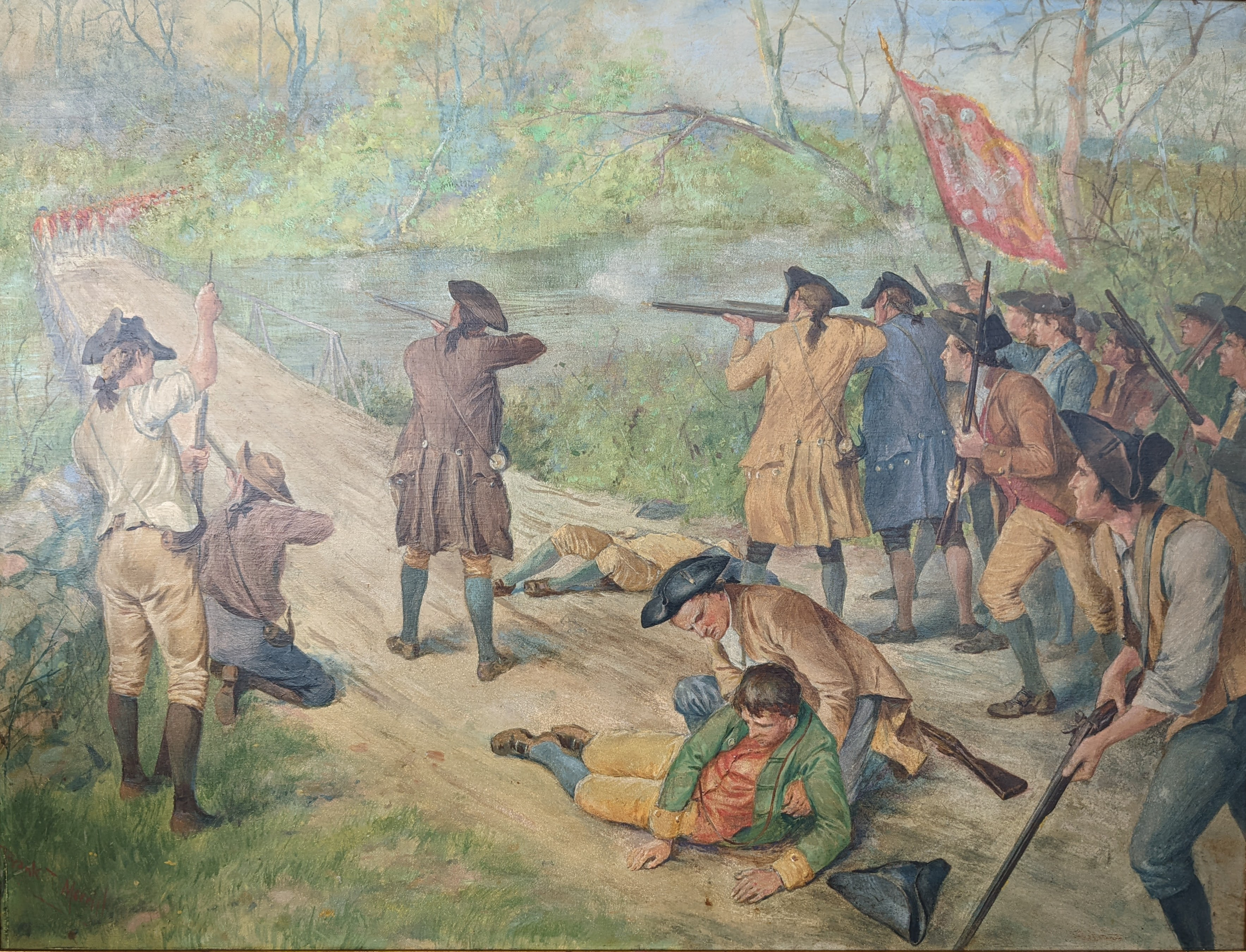
Frank T. Merrill, North Bridge, Concord, 1775 (oil painting, 1909). The Battles of Lexington and Concord began on April 19, 1775, with the shot heard round the world at the North Bridge and Lexington Green

The Revolutionary War began with the Battle of Lexington and the Siege of Boston on April 19, 1775. Notified by riders, colonists assembled to fight against the British Redcoats and support the minutemen of the Massachusetts militia.

== Draper's role in the war ==
Draper planned how she would feed men passing by their farm to the battle. Draper, her daughter Kate, and a servant named Molly prepared food from their granaries and dairy. The women continually kneaded and baked brown bread that day, night, and the next day. When she ran out of goods for cooking, her neighbors helped out.

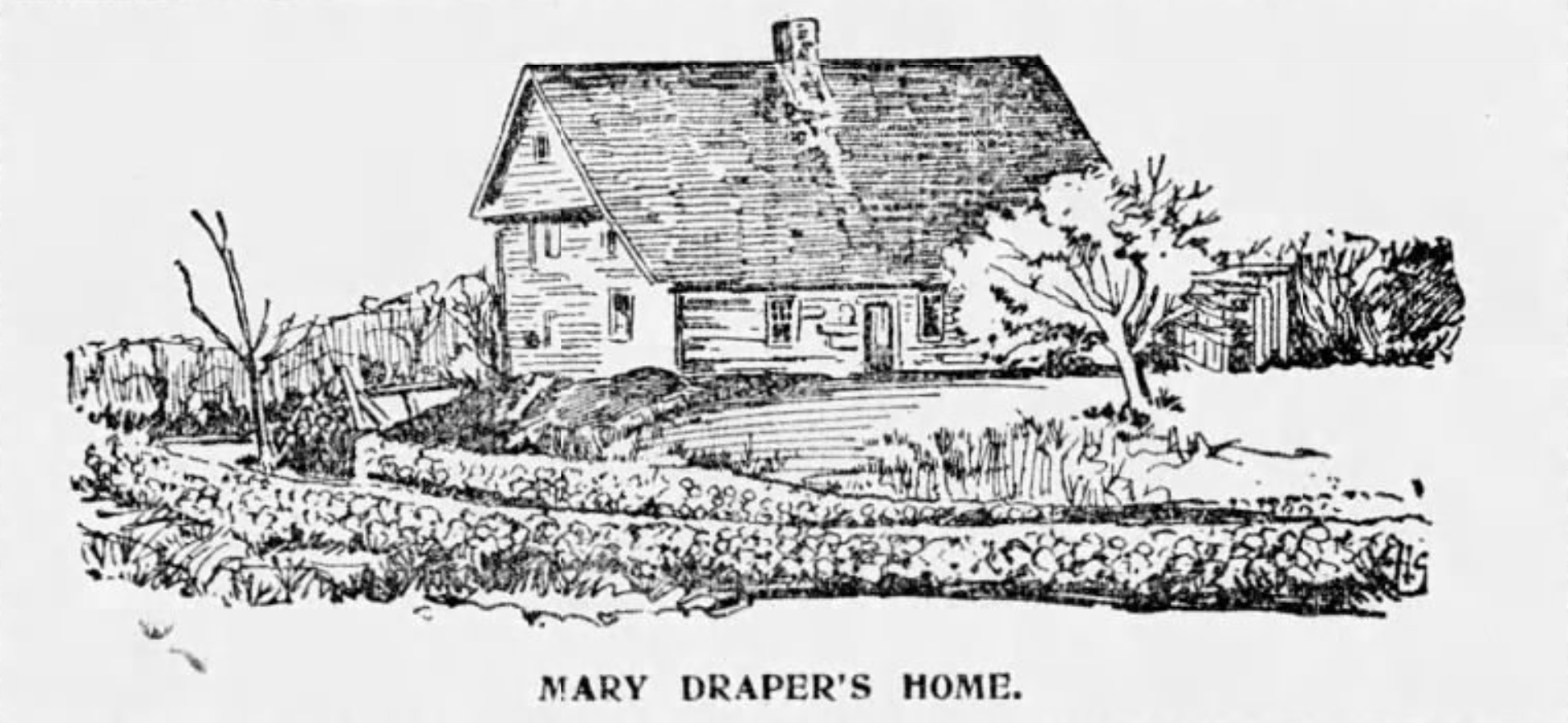
Mary Draper's Home, West Roxbury and Dedham, Massachusetts

The Draper farm was alongside the Old Post Road between Providence, Rhode Island and Boston. Answering the Lexington Alarm, men from Connecticut and Rhode Island passed by her house on their way to the battlefields in Massachusetts. On the road, she set up a long station with bread, cheese, and apple cider. Aided by John, a disabled veteran of the French wars and a family member, and two boys, food was handed out to the hundreds of men marching to war. They served food for the men who passed her farm. When needed, she provided food for soldiers during the war, but the need was not as great or frequent as the initial days of the war.

General George Washington asked citizens to deliver pewter or lead to headquarters to create ammunition for the ongoing Siege of Boston (April 19, 1775 – March 17, 1776). Draper used bullet molds to create ammunition from melted pewter from her large collection of dishes, platters, and pans.

With the help of her daughter and a maid, she spun wool from her flocks of sheep and wove it into fabric to make coats and blankets and sheets were made into shirts for the soldiers. As Draper had throughout her life, if someone was in need of housing, she took them in. She also provided medical care during the war.

== Death and legacy ==
Mary Draper died in Dedham, Massachusetts on November 20, 1810. She is buried next to 17th-century settlers James Draper and his wife Miriam at the small burial ground in West Roxbury.

A chapter of the Daughters of the American Revolution in West Roxbury, Massachusetts was named after her in 1896. The wife of her descendant, Amos G. Draper, was a member of the chapter. Its motto is, "Our country, to be cherished in all our hearts, to be defended by all our hands.

== Bibliography ==
- Allen, Emma Frances (March 1902). "Mary Draper". American Monthly Magazine. Vol. 20, no. 3. National Society of the Daughters.
- Dedham Historical Register. Dedham, Massachusetts: Dedham Historical Society. 1890.
- Ellet, E. F. (Elizabeth Fries) (1849). Women of the American Revolution. New York, Baker & Scribner.
- Logan, Mrs. John A. (1912). The Part Taken by Women in the American Revolution. Perry-Nalle publishing Company.
