= Ellen Lanyon =

American painter (1926–2013)

- Born: December 21, 1926; Chicago, Illinois
- Died: October 7, 2013 (aged 86)
- Known for: Painting
- Spouse: Roland Ginzel (m. 1948)

Ellen Lanyon (December 21, 1926 – October 7, 2013) was a painter and printmaker from Chicago, Illinois. She received her BFA from the School of the Art Institute of Chicago (SAIC), her MFA from the University of Iowa School of Art and Art History and studied restoration at the Courtauld Institute of Art. She also received an honorary doctorate from SAIC. Her works are in the permanent collections of many major American museums, including the Art Institute of Chicago, the Museum of Contemporary Art Chicago, the Metropolitan Museum of Art, the Smithsonian American Art Museum, and the Ulrich Museum.

== Life ==
Lanyon was born in Chicago to Howard and Ellen Lanyon. As a child, she visited the "Midget Village" at the Chicago World's Fair in 1933, a rather surreal experience that had a strong impression on her as an artist. She attended Hyde Park High School while holding a part-time job as an artist in the foundry where her father worked, drawing machine parts. She credits her careful rendering of line to this experience.

In 1944, Lanyon was invited to a work-study program at the Ox-Bow School of Art. It was her experience there, including her work at the Museum for Contemporary Arts and the Department of Prints and Drawings – which inspired her to pursue painting and printmaking. In 1948, she completed her BFA at the School of the Art Institute of Chicago. That same year she married classmate and fellow artist Roland Ginzel. She also became a leader of the Exhibition Momentum, a juried venue started in 1948 in protest of the Art Institute of Chicago's annual exhibition. Earlier that year, the Art Institute had restricted students from entering the juried exhibition. In response, Lanyon joined with other students to recruit New York artists and curators to jury the Momentum. Three years later, the Art Institute opened its exhibition to students again.

Lanyon subsequently competed her MFA at the University of Iowa in 1950 and did postgraduate work at The Courtauld Institute of Art in London, UK while on a Fulbright Fellowship. In 1953, Lanyon returned to Chicago with her husband. Together with three other printmakers from the University of Iowa, they founded the Graphic Arts Workshop (1953–1956).

== Career ==
Lanyon spent the early years of her career in her hometown, where she was often identified with the Chicago Imagists. Her first paintings were of cityscapes. The perspective she chose was influenced by her travel on the Chicago "L", as well as the 15th-century Sienese paintings she viewed in the Art Institute galleries. This "sophisticated primitive" work continued until the late 1950's when she became inspired to paint larger works in oil. Her works from this period (late 1950s to the 1960s) include portraits of relatives and the rooms they inhabited. Several years later, Lanyon developed an allergy to the solvents used in oil painting. Although Lanyon had worked in printmaking before, the allergy marked a major transition back to her earlier medium.

In the 1970s, Lanyon moved to New York City and became a member of the Heresies Collective, which created Heresies: A Feminist Publication on Art and Politics. In 1976, Lanyon received a commission from the Department of the Interior to work in the Everglades, which she says "awakened [her] to the environmental crisis" and led to art with a heavier focus on flora and fauna. Toward the end of her life, she began depicting objects from her collection of curios, many of which were inherited from relatives, such as a tobacco jar which once belonged to her grandfather. The jar, which is shaped like a toad wearing a red waistcoat, appears in several of her works.

Lanyon's art has been characterized as Surrealist or Magical Realist, and she sometimes used the term "dreamscapes" to describe it. Her fantastical compositions often feature animal, vegetal, and floral motifs. Later works frequently depict everyday objects imbued with both domestic and menacing overtones and have been compared to the metaphysical art of the 1910s and ‘20s.

== Index and Curiosity ==
Index came about from Lanyon's desire to catalogue the 292 items that appeared in her earlier artwork. Over three years (2001–2003), Lanyon created numbered, pen and ink drawings of each artifact and compiled them into five encyclopedic books: Personae, Folly Animale, O.J. Darr, Mechanique, and Smoking Guns. Several of these drawings are accompanied by poems written by her friend, Lynne Warren, who was separately inspired by Lanyon's collection. In 2002, Index became a long-distance collaboration between Lanyon and Kip Gresham, a master printer and owner of The Print Studio in Cambridge, England. Lanyon mailed her drawings to Gresham, who printed two editions of the book.

Lanyon's Index was strongly inspired by Louis Poyet's wood engravings. This relationship became clearer as Lanyon began creating Curiosity, a series of works that overlaid Index prints with Poyet's engravings. In 2013, Lanyon traveled to England to develop a pencil-and-watercolor technique that blended with the lines of the engravings. When she returned to the US one week later, she had a heart attack in Newark Airport.

== Notable works ==
Lanyon has had over seventy-five solo gallery exhibitions and eleven museum exhibitions, including three major traveling retrospectives. Her work is in the collections of the Art Institute of Chicago; the Museum of Contemporary Art, Chicago; the Brooklyn Museum; the Metropolitan Museum of Art, New York; the National Museum of American Art; the National Museum of Women in the Arts; the Walker Art Center; the Milwaukee Museum of Art; the Spencer Museum of Art; and the Wadsworth Atheneum, among others. Lanyon has also taught art at several institutions including the Art Institute of Chicago, the Cooper Union and the School of Visual Arts. Her mural, Nine Notable Women, is featured on the Boston Women's Heritage Trail. She also painted the 28-panel historical mural along Chicago's lakefront Riverwalk Gateway.
