= Lina Frank Hecht =

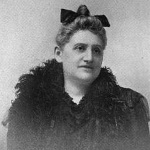
- Born: Lina Frank c. 1848; Baltimore, U.S.
- Died: September 5, 1920 (aged 71); Boston, U.S.
- Known for: Philanthropy

Lina Frank Hecht (c. 1848 – September 5, 1920) was one of Boston's leading philanthropists. She founded several of the city's earliest settlement houses, most notably the Hebrew Industrial School for Girls. She was active in the Women's Educational and Industrial Union, supported the arts, and helped launch the careers of Mary Antin and Louis Brandeis. In 1908 she became the first female vice president of the Federated Jewish Charities.

== Biography ==
Lina Frank was born in Baltimore, Maryland, in about 1848. She was one of eight children of Simon Frank and Fanny Naumberg, Jewish immigrants from Germany. In 1868 she married Jacob Hecht, a German Jewish immigrant who ran a successful manufacturing business with his brothers. The couple moved to a brownstone on Commonwealth Avenue near the Boston Public Garden and were active members of Temple Adath Israel. As leaders of Boston's German Jewish community, they worked together to professionalize the city's most important Jewish charitable organization, the United Hebrew Benevolent Association (UHBA).

In the 1880s, driven by economic need and government-sanctioned pogroms, Eastern European Jewish immigrants began arriving in Boston by the thousands. The Hechts were determined to do all they could to help the new arrivals. Lina Hecht started by reorganizing the Hebrew Ladies Sewing Circle in the South End, annexing it to the UHBA, so that it was able to provide blankets and clothing to the immigrants. Under her leadership, its membership expanded to 500 women. The women hosted Chanukah parties for the poor, and successful fundraising balls for the wealthy.

Next, she started a Jewish Sunday school in the North End. Golde Bamber, a social activist who taught at the Sunday school, told her about Hull House in Chicago and encouraged her to open a settlement house for the daughters of Jewish immigrants in Boston. In 1889, Hecht founded the Hebrew Industrial School for Girls and made Bamber its first director. H.I.S. offered classes in literature, history, government, music, religion, cooking, sewing, millinery, and printing. It also provided bathing facilities for the children, most of whom lived in tenements with few or no bathrooms.

The Hechts had no children, but took in and supported several relatives. They also mentored talented young people, including Louis Brandeis, who went on to become a Supreme Court Justice, and the writer Mary Antin. Lina Hecht was known as "Aunt Lina" to the hundreds of immigrant children she helped.

Hecht was actively involved with the Women's Educational and Industrial Union, the Public Bath Department of Boston, the Civil Service Reform Association, the Consumer's League, the Jewish Publication Society, and the Council of Jewish Women. She and her husband were jointly involved in artistic and historic organizations such as the Boston Art Club and The Bostonian Society. When her husband died in 1903, she was named executor of his will and given permission to spend as much as she saw fit on the H.I.S.; for a widow at that time, it was an unusual display of trust in her abilities. In 1908, she became the first female vice president of the Federated Jewish Charities.

She died in Boston on September 5, 1920, at the age of 71, and was buried in Baltimore.

== Legacy ==
The Hebrew Industrial School continued to serve the community after Hecht's death. After Bamber moved the school to Bowdoin Street in the West End, it was renamed the Hecht Neighborhood House and began admitting boys as well as girls, and serving other ethnic groups. In 1936 the school moved to Dorchester, where it became a community center and served the neighborhood until 1970.

Hecht is remembered in connection with the Hebrew Industrial School on the Boston Women's Heritage Trail.
