= Joseph Foxcroft Cole =

American painter (1837–1892)

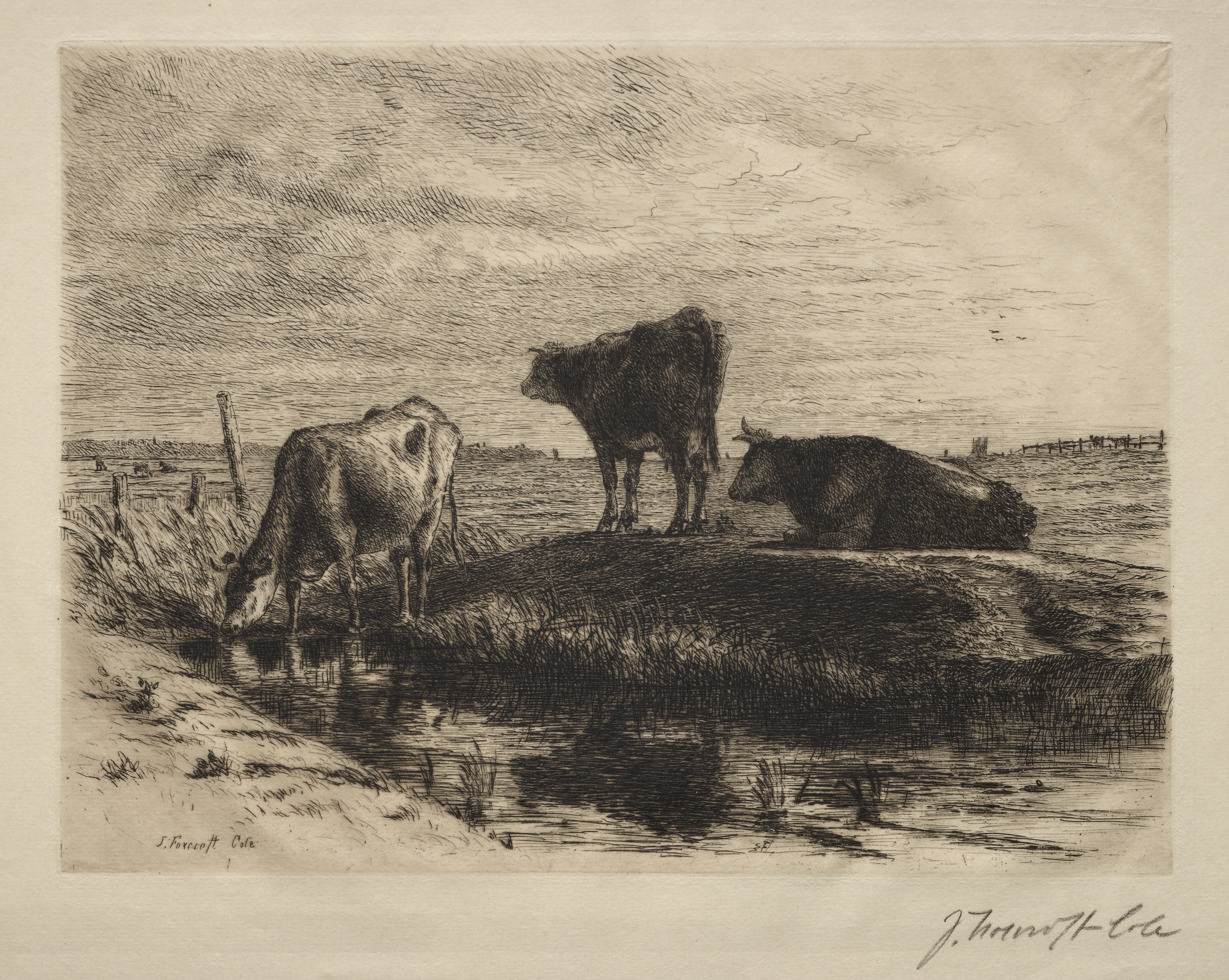
- The Three Cows, etching
- Born: 1837; Jay, Maine
- Died: 1892 (aged 54–55); Winchester, Massachusetts
- Known for: Painting
- Movement: Barbizon school

Joseph Foxcroft Cole (1837–1892) was an American landscape artist of the Barbizon style of landscape painting.

== Life and career ==
Cole and fellow apprentice Winslow Homer studied in Boston, before Cole moved to France to study with Émile Lambinet and Charles Jacque. Cole exhibited in Paris at the 1866-67 and 1873-75 Salons, and the Exposition Universelle (1867).
