= Elizabeth Murray Campbell Smith Inman =

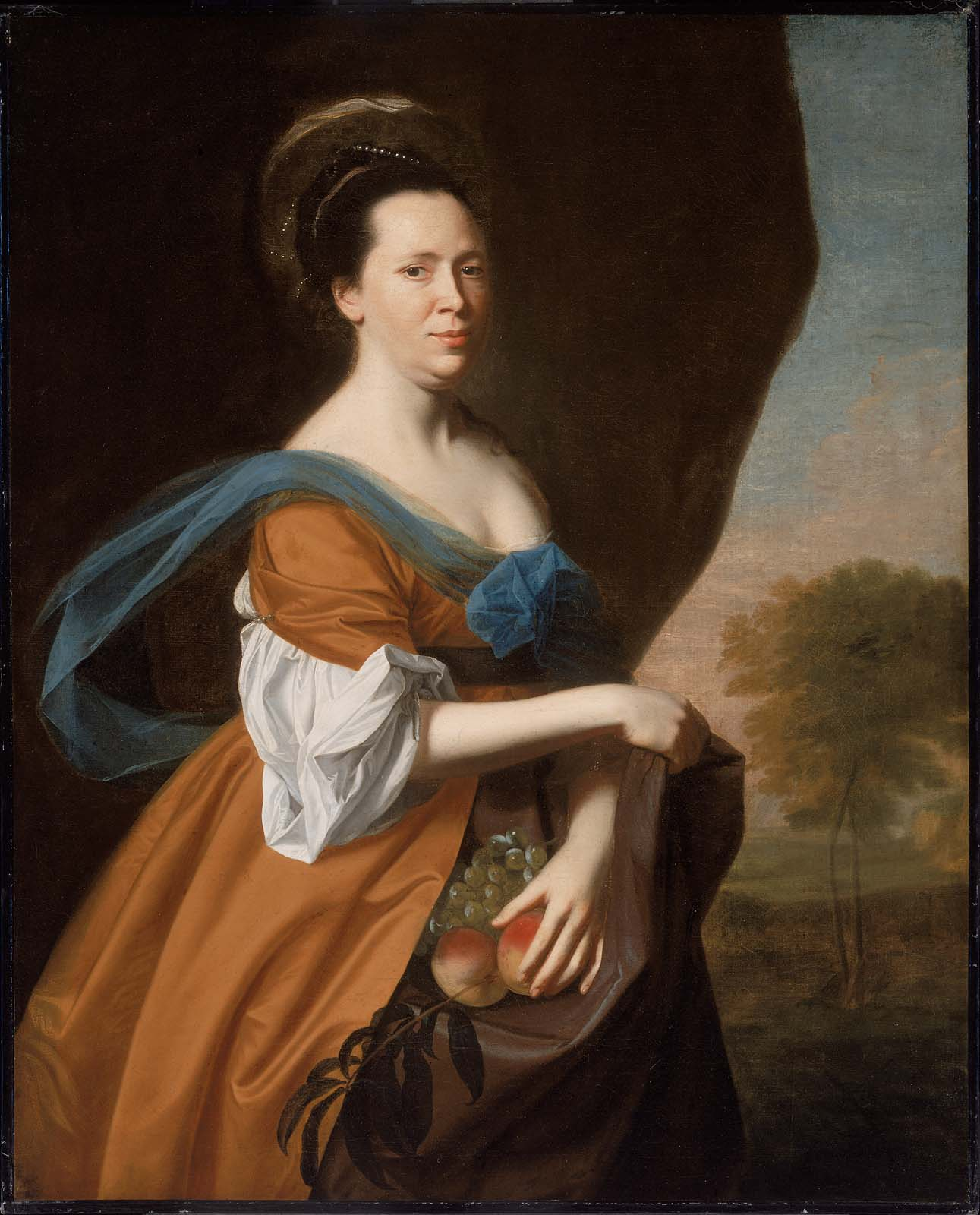
John Singleton Copley - Elizabeth Murray (Museum of Fine Arts)

Elizabeth Murray Campbell Smith Inman (July 7, 1726 – May 25, 1785) was a shopkeeper, teacher, and philanthropist in Boston, Massachusetts before, during, and after the American Revolution. Murray spent much of her adult life teaching her nieces and female friends the importance of personal financial autonomy through shopkeeping and other traditionally female domestic duties.

== Biography ==
=== Early life ===
Elizabeth Murray was born in and spent the first twelve years of her life in Unthank, Scotland, until her older brother James, an up-and-coming merchant, brought her to his new North Carolina home to be his housekeeper. In this capacity, Murray learned the attendant responsibilities, such as "keeping accounts with local merchants and vendors, selecting and purchasing the items needed for household consumption, overseeing the work of any servants, and performing numerous chores associated with housecleaning and preparing food and clothing"

At seventeen, she moved with James and his new bride to London, where Murray saw the city bustling with shop-owning women who sold wide arrays of cloth and other popular goods from all over the world. Also, London, offered her a chance to see the latest fashions in ladies' clothing that were so popular both in Great Britain and in its colonies.

Sailing back to America, the Murrays stopped in Boston, and Elizabeth Murray, now twenty-three, decided to stay in the bustling commercial hub to open her own shop. Because many urban women were running taverns and small schools, it was considered an appropriate extension of women's acceptable domestic duties to support themselves through businesses they ran out of their homes.

=== Career ===
Backed by her brother's mercantile connections in Great Britain, Elizabeth established credit in the commercial world and was able to sell the latest fashions from London in her Boston shop. She advertised in local newspapers, such as the Boston Gazette and the Boston Evening-Post, showcasing both her world-class ladies' apparel and her talents as a teacher of "Needle Works". Additionally, Elizabeth allowed her female students to board with her, to supplement her income. After a trip to London to make more business connections, Elizabeth returned to Boston and sent for James' daughter Dolly, wanting to give her the chance to pursue the "superior educational opportunities" in the northern city. Dolly worked under both Elizabeth and other local women to gain an education in arithmetic, shopkeeping, reading, and sewing.

In 1755, Elizabeth married Thomas Campbell, a trader and ship's captain, thereby trading in her status as an independent single woman for the protection (and legal limitations) of couverture. Their union signified a business partnership, in which Thomas handled the larger commercial transactions, while Elizabeth ran the shop. Additionally, she became part of a female network of shop-owners and teachers in Boston with whom she interacted and traded services with daily. However, by the age of thirty-two, Elizabeth became widowed when Thomas died of the measles in 1759.

By 1760, Elizabeth married for a second time to a wealthy old widower named James Smith, who would change her financial status for the rest of her life. Under their prenuptial agreement, James stipulated that she would not be rendered personally, legally, or financial dependent under couverture; instead, Elizabeth would be allowed to keep all of her own money that she had earned as a shopkeeper, and would be entitled to one-third of his considerable estate if he died before her. Because of their wealth, both Elizabeth and James stopped working and enjoyed a leisurely life in Brush Hill, outside of Boston. She did, however, continue to teach women the ways of shopkeeping and other business ventures, financially helping out young women like her nieces Dolly, Betsy, and Anne, as well as local up-and-coming merchants like Ame and Elizabeth Cumings. Additionally, Elizabeth's single, independent friend and protégé Jannette Day enjoyed the financial and emotional support of her friend.

By 1763, Elizabeth's ventures in helping her female friends and family were stymied by the violence in the Boston streets, when colonists became enraged at the taxes imposed on them by the British government. Growing out of the resentment of the Sugar Acts of 1764 and the Stamp Act of 1765 were boycotts on British goods and attacks on loyalists like Andrew Oliver and Thomas Hutchinson. Because Elizabeth's brother James and her husband were involved in housing British soldiers in James Smith's sugar factory when the British landed in Boston in 1768, she and her family became vulnerable to the rioters' hostilities. When her second husband died, Elizabeth became a woman of great wealth, further solidifying her status as an independent, wealthy widow. She decided to leave for London to escape the violence running rampant in Boston; but before she left on a dangerous journey across the Atlantic, Elizabeth wrote her will, leaving much money to her family and female friends like Jannette Day and her daughter Jackie.

When Elizabeth visited her brother John's family in Norwich, England, she decided to take his daughter Mary Murray (nicknamed Polly) under her wing, teaching her all that she herself had learned as a shopkeeper in Boston. She immediately set upon sending Polly to Boston to make connections in the commercial world and boarding with her merchant friends, the Cumings sisters. They would teach her all she needed to know about shopkeeping and running a business for herself. Additionally, Elizabeth sent her young nephew Jack to voyage with his sister across the Atlantic to Boston, in hopes of his becoming an apprentice for a successful merchant cousin in Rhode Island. Despite the unrest growing in Boston and many of her friends becoming attacked for importing British goods, Elizabeth decided to send Polly and Jack to Boston, anyway. To Elizabeth's surprise, when the Cumings sisters were publicly reviled in the press, their business turned even more successful, because of their insistence on " 'Striving in an honest way to Git there Bread'." Thus, women were finding themselves thrust into a world in which their decisions to purchase goods had become fraught with political meaning.

Returning to Boston in April 1771 with her new charge Jackie, Elizabeth found Boston much calmer than when she had left a year and a half earlier. She decided to remarry for a third time to fellow shopkeeper Ralph Inman, who would help improve her finances, which she realized were not in good order upon her return to Boston. She and Ralph signed a prenuptial agreement that allowed her to keep her wealth and continue to help young women get started in business. Unfortunately, she quickly learned that this marriage was not a good match, emotionally. Boston's turmoil with the British began to flare up again, and she removed to Cambridge with her niece Dolly to oversee her and her husband's estate, despite the fact that most women were leaving the area altogether. Her husband and her brother remained in Boston, now occupied and closed off by the British, under General Thomas Gage. Elizabeth wrote her husband repeatedly, even after rebel troops had kept her prisoner in her own house, but Ralph did not respond to her entreaties for him to join her in Cambridge. She stayed on in Cambridge, without her husband's protection, "overseeing crops, financial matters, and business decisions," all the while feeling abandoned by Ralph. When Ralph did contact his wife that he needed money, he urged her to come to Boston to join him, something she refused to do. When she insisted on defying her husband's wishes, Ralph made plans to sail to Great Britain without her, thereby separating from her indefinitely. Elizabeth decided that her brother James' daughter Betsy should stay with her and learn more shopkeeping, despite the Revolution taking place in Boston. She finally went to Boston to assist her niece Anne Murray, who was working in a Boston shop. When she realized Anne was unhappy with shopkeeping and wished to get married and leave America, Elizabeth did all she could to help solidify the union. Ralph was arrested before he could leave Boston and his property was seized by rebel forces in 1776.

She was later castigated in the press for befriending a Scottish officer taken prisoner in Boston named Archibald Campbell, perhaps related to her first husband. She sent him various items in prison to assuage the pain of his imprisonment, such as books, rum, coffee, and sugar. She continued this relationship, despite smears on her name that associated her with political activity and prostitution.

When the war drew to a close and her brother James died, many of Elizabeth's nieces and nephews came to live with her and Ralph in Cambridge or nearby. The war had destroyed her and her husband's finances, but they decided to stay with one another. Elizabeth continued to urge her kin to come to Boston to take up shopkeeping, until she fell ill in the spring of 1785. Prior to her death, she drew up a new will that bequeathed much of what was left of her estate to her family, particularly her nieces and family friends.

=== Death and afterward ===
Elizabeth Murray Campbell Smith Inman died on May 25, 1785, with Polly and Betsy at her side. She was buried in a tomb alongside her second husband, James Smith, at the cemetery in King's Chapel in Boston. Her husband, Ralph Inman, received relatively little of her fortune, causing a great deal of stress for Elizabeth's nieces and the rest of her family in disputing her will.
