= Mildred Davenport =

- Born: November 12, 1900; Roxbury, Massachusetts
- Died: 1990 (aged 89–90); Boston, Massachusetts
- Occupations: Dancer, Educator

Mildred Davenport (November 12, 1900 - 1990) was an African-American Broadway performer and dance teacher. She was the first African-American woman to appear with the Boston Pops orchestra.

== Biography ==
She was born in Roxbury, Massachusetts to Mary Davenport and Samuel Davenport, a Pullman porter. She attended Boston Girls' High School, graduating in 1918, and then went on to the Sargent School for Physical Culture at Boston University. Afterwards she studied dance with Ted Shawn.

In the 1920s, she opened her first dance school, the Davenport School of Dance, where she taught for a decade. In 1932, she founded her second dance school, the Silver Box Studio, at 522 Columbus Avenue in Boston.

In the 1930s, she performed in a number of musicals and revues on Broadway, including Blackbirds and Flying Colors. At a time when it was rare for African-American and white performers to appear together on the stage, she danced with performers like Imogene Coca and Clifton Webb. In 1938, she danced interpretations of spirituals with the Boston Pops orchestra, becoming the first African-American woman to appear with the Boston Pops. She toured the East Coast for five years in a show entitled Chocolate Review.

In World War II, Davenport became one of the first black women to enlist in the Women's Auxiliary Army Corps, rising from first lieutenant to captain during the war.

After the war, she worked for the Massachusetts Commission Against Discrimination for two decades (1947–1968) and served on the board of directors for the Boston branch of the NAACP.

In 1973 Davenport received the Sojourner Truth Award of the National Association of Negro Business and Professional Women's Clubs, Boston and Vicinity Club.

Davenport died in Boston, Massachusetts in 1990.

A collection of her papers, photographs, dance programs, and other ephemera is held by UC Irvine's Special Collections and Archives.
