= Action for Boston Community Development =

Non-profit organization in Massachusetts, US

Action for Boston Community Development, Inc. (ABCD)
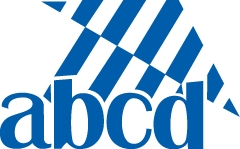
- Founded: 1961; 65 years ago - Boston Community Development Program (BCDP); July 24, 1962; 64 years ago - Action for Boston Community Development (ABCD)
- Founder: Melnea Cass
- Type: 501(c)(3)
- Purpose: Anti-poverty
- Location: 178 Tremont Street, Boston, Massachusetts 02111 US
- Coordinates: 42.35291°N 71.06411°W
- Origins: Boston Community Development Program (BCDP) in 1961
- Region served: Boston neighborhoods
- Method: centralized and neighborhood education, services, training, counseling, and advocacy; Area Planning Action Council (APAC); Neighborhood Services Center (NSC); Family Service Center (FSC)
- Key people: Sharon Scott-Chandler, President/CEO; Candice Caines-Francis, Chairperson of the Board
- Revenue: $377,827,246 (funding 2024)
- Employees: Approximately 1,000
- Website: bostonabcd.org

Action for Boston Community Development (ABCD) is an anti-poverty, community development and human services organization founded in 1961 as Boston Community Development Program (BCDP) in Boston, Massachusetts, and incorporated as Action for Boston Community Development in 1962, serving as a prototype for urban "human renewal" agencies. (Note: "ABCD History", ABCD website (archived 2008))

It is the largest non-profit human services agency in New England, annually serving more than 100,000 low-income Greater Boston-area residents through its central offices and a decentralized network of Neighborhood Service Centers (NSCs), Head Start centers, Family Planning sites, and Foster Grandparent sites.

Every year since 1974, ABCD has a Community Awards dinner honoring people and organizations who have made significant contributions to the Boston community especially through their volunteerism. (Note: ABCD Community Awards Dinner - ABCD website) (Note: ABCD 2010 Community Awards Dinner - website (archived 2011))

== Citywide network of service centers ==
ABCD provides services to the community through a decentralized, citywide network, which includes 15 neighborhood centers.

== Schools ==
ABCD operates two schools for specialized populations and serve as alternative learning environments.

- William J. Ostiguy High School
- University High School

== History ==
- 1961. Boston residents, with support from Mayor John F. Collins and the Permanent Charity Fund (now called The Boston Foundation), established the Boston Community Development Program (BCDP) to improve quality of life for city residents.
- 1962. BCDP was incorporated as Action for Boston Community Development (ABCD), a prototype for urban "human renewal" agencies (such as Community Action Agencies), with initial funding of $1.9 million from the Ford Foundation. Community activists, including Melnea Cass, founded ABCD.
- 1964. Congress passed the Economic Opportunity Act as part of President Lyndon B. Johnson's Great Society campaign and its War on Poverty. The City of Boston designated ABCD as its official anti-poverty agency. ABCD established a neighborhood-based Area Planning Action Council (APAC) system to manage 11 target neighborhoods of acutely concentrated poverty.
- 1967. ABCD started the Urban College Program to meet the educational, employment and career development needs of the adult community. This was a collaboration with major Boston area colleges and universities which enabled men and women over the years to earn academic credits toward undergraduate and graduate degrees while still acquiring job-related skills.
- 1973. ABCD and three other community action agencies filed a successful class action suit to prevent United States President Richard Nixon from abolishing the Office of Economic Opportunity.
- 1982. ABCD received an award received from United States President Ronald Reagan for the private sector initiative in the ABCD/Shawmut Bank/Bank of New England Training Program.
- 1993. The Massachusetts Board of Higher Education gives a charter as a degree-granting institution of higher education to the Urban College of Boston, a two-year college, set up by ABCD.
- 2006. The Urban College of Boston received continued accreditation from the New England Association of Schools and Colleges (NEASC), Inc. Commission on Institutions of Higher Education.
- 2009. Following the death of long-time president and CEO, Robert M. Coard (who had worked for ABCD since 1964 and was its Executive Director since 1968), ABCD's board of directors named John J. Drew as Coard's successor. Prior to his accepting the top post, Drew had served for more than 20 years as ABCD's Vice President.

== Selected program descriptions ==
=== Head Start ===
ABCD Head Start and Children's Services is the largest early childhood provider in Boston, and is among the top three early childhood providers in the state (Note: "Why Head Start?", Boston Head Start website)

ABCD Head Start and Children's Services is a family development program that serves pregnant women, children from birth to age five, and their families. The Head Start programs that ABCD runs are child-focused and designed to provide opportunities and services to low-income children and families of Boston.

=== Fuel Assistance ===
ABCD Fuel Assistance helps more than 24,000 low-income households in Boston, Brookline and Newton as well as residents of the Mystic Valley Cities, Towns of Malden, Medford, Everette, Melrose, Stoneham, Winchester and Woburn pay fuel bills during the heating season. During the 2008 season, the Fuel Assistance program was able to expand eligibility requirements thanks to increased federal and state funding, up to a family of four with an income of $53,608 being eligible for some assistance.

=== SummerWorks ===
ABCD's SummerWorks program, started in 1965, found jobs for 600 people between the ages of 14 and 24 during the summer of 2018. Participants receive guidance, comprehensive work readiness and life skills workshops ranging from resume writing, financial education, conflict resolution and workplace etiquette. Many of them will be placed at local non-profit organizations such as hospitals, health centers, museums, day camps, government agencies and child care centers.
