= Emily Greene Balch =

American economist, academic, and Nobel Laureate

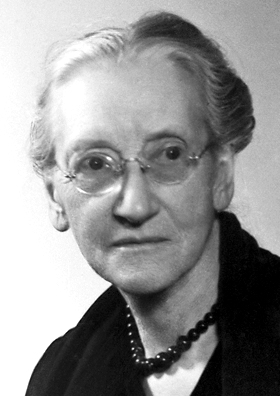
- Born: January 8, 1867; Boston, Massachusetts, U.S.
- Died: January 9, 1961 (aged 94); Cambridge, Massachusetts, U.S.
- Occupations: Writer, economist, professor
- Known for: Nobel Peace Prize in 1946 (shared with John Mott)

Emily Greene Balch (January 8, 1867 – January 9, 1961) was an American economist, sociologist and pacifist. Balch combined an academic career at Wellesley College with a long-standing interest in social issues such as poverty, child labor, and immigration, as well as settlement work to uplift poor immigrants and reduce juvenile delinquency.

She moved into the peace movement at the start of World War I in 1914, and began collaborating with Jane Addams of Chicago. She became a central leader of the Women's International League for Peace and Freedom (WILPF) based in Switzerland, for which she won the Nobel Peace Prize in 1946, sharing the win with John Mott.

== Early life and education ==
Balch was born to a prominent Yankee family in Jamaica Plain, Massachusetts (later a neighborhood of Boston), the daughter of Francis V. and Ellen (née Noyes) Balch. Her father was a successful lawyer and one time secretary to United States Senator Charles Sumner. She graduated from Bryn Mawr College in 1889 after reading widely in the classics and languages and focusing on economics. She did graduate work in Paris and published her research as Public Assistance of the Poor in France (1893). She did settlement housework in Boston before deciding on an academic career.

She then studied at Harvard University, the University of Chicago, and the University of Berlin.

== Career ==
Balch began teaching at Wellesley College in 1896. She focused on immigration, consumption, and the economic roles of women. In 1913, she was appointed to serve as Professor of Economics at Wellesley, following the resignation of political economist Katharine Coman, who had founded the department. That same year, Balch was promoted from Associate Professor to Professor of Political Economy and of Political and Social Science.

Balch served on numerous state commissions, such as the first commission on minimum wages for women. She was a leader of the Women's Trade Union League, which supported women who belonged to labor unions. She published a major sociological study of Our Slavic Fellow Citizens in 1910.

She was a longtime pacifist, and was a participant in Henry Ford's International Committee on Mediation, the follow-up organization to the Neutral Conference for Continuous Mediation. When the United States entered the war, she became a political activist opposing conscription in espionage legislation, and supporting the civil liberties of conscientious objectors. She collaborated with Jane Addams in the Woman's Peace Party and numerous other groups.

In a letter to the president of Wellesley, she wrote we should follow "the ways of Jesus." Her spiritual thoughts were that American economy was "far from being in harmony with the principles of Jesus which we profess." Wellesley College terminated her contract in 1919. Balch served as an editor of The Nation, a well-known magazine of political commentary.

Balch converted from Unitarianism to Quakerism in 1921. She stated, "Religion seems to me one of the most interesting things in life, one of the most puzzling, richest and thrilling fields of human thought and speculation... religious experience and thought need also a light a day and sunshine and a companionable sharing with others of which it seems to me there is generally too little... The Quaker worship at its best seems to me give opportunities for this sort of sharing without profanation."

Her major achievements were just beginning, as she became an American leader of the international peace movement. In 1919, Balch played a central role in the International Congress of Women. It changed its name to the Women's International League for Peace and Freedom and was based in Geneva.

She was hired by the League as its first international Secretary-Treasurer, administering the organization's activities. She helped set up summer schools on peace education and created new branches in over 50 countries. She cooperated with the newly established League of Nations regarding drug control, aviation, refugees, and disarmament. In World War II, she supported the Allied powers and did not criticize the war effort, but she did support the rights of conscientious objectors.

== Nobel Prize ==
John Randall, professor of philosophy at Columbia University, and his wife, Mercedes Randall, one of the leaders of the US section of the Women's International League for Peace and Freedom, initiated a campaign to nominate Balch for the peace prize. The campaign was supported by five US organizations that established a committee called the "Committee to sponsor Emily Greene Balch for the Nobel Peace Prize". The organizations were the Women's International League for Peace and Freedom, the National Federation of Settlements, the Women's Trade Union League of America, the National Council of Women of the US, and the NAACP.

Balch won the 1946 Nobel Peace Prize for her work with the Women's International League for Peace and Freedom (WILPF). She shared the win with John Mott. She donated her share of the prize money to the WILPF. Her acceptance speech highlighted the issues of nationalism and efforts for international peace.

== Personal life ==
Balch never married. She died the day after her 94th birthday.

== See also ==
- List of female Nobel laureates
- List of peace activists
- Boston Women's Heritage Trail

== Bibliography ==
- Emily Greene Balch, Public Assistance of the Poor in France, Vol. 8, Nos. 4 & 5, Publications of the American Economic Association.
- Emily Greene Balch, "A Study of Conditions of City Life: with Special Reference to Boston, A Bibliography", 1903, 13 pages
- Our Slavic Fellow Citizens By Emily Greene Balch, 1910, 536 pages.
- Women at the Hague: the International Congress of Women and its Results, By Jane Addams, Emily Greene Balch, and Alice Hamilton. 171 pages, New York: MacMillan, 1915.
- Approaches to the Great Settlement By Emily Greene Balch & Pauline Knickerbocker Angell (1918), 351 pages
