= Mary Kenney O'Sullivan =

American labor organizer (1864–1943)

- Mary Kenney O'Sullivan
- Born: Mary Kenney; January 8, 1864; Hannibal, Missouri
- Died: January 18, 1943 (aged 79); Medford, Massachusetts
- Occupations: Labor organizer, suffragist
- Spouse: Jack O'Sullivan (m. 1894; died in 1902)

Mary Kenney O'Sullivan (January 8, 1864 – January 18, 1943), was an organizer in the early U.S. labor movement. She learned early the importance of unions from poor treatment received at her first job in dressmaking. Making a career in bookbinding, she joined the Ladies Federal Local Union Number 2703 and organized her own group from within, Woman's Bookbinding Union Number 1.

Her women's bookbinding union became a branch of the American Federation of Labor (AFL) and she went on to become a full-salaried organizer. Though she would not hold the position for long she is remembered as being the first woman AFL employed on a full salary.

She was a member of the Jane Addams's settlement house movement, moving into Hull House in the 1880s. There she proceeded to organize women's work and clubs. Later in 1884, she married a labor editor and organizer named John O'Sullivan at Boston. They moved into Denison House, a settlement house where O'Sullivan continued to perform labor organizing. This was a unique opportunity for her as it was uncommon for husbands to support their wives working. Together they had 3 children.

In 1903 in what may be her greatest achievement, O'Sullivan would become a founder of the Women's Trade Union League. She worked with the union in many reform actions. She also aided the Industrial Workers of the World during the Lawrence Textile Strike. She ultimately ended her career in labor as an inspector for the Massachusetts Board of Labor and Industries, a position she held for 20 years.

== Early life ==
Mary Kenney was born in Hannibal, Missouri to Irish immigrants. She achieved only a fourth grade education but went on to apprentice as a dressmaker. She spent a two-year period dressmaking with no pay. Post-dressmaking O'Sullivan learned the bindery trade and became an accomplished book binder. It was this experience, and her early work in bookbinding that led her to understand the need for unionization. Working to support her mother, O'Sullivan moved to Chicago in 1888. There she continued her bindery career, but to garner support for herself and other women like her she joined Ladies Federal Local Union Number 2703 and started her union organization, Woman's Bookbinding Union Number 1.

While organizing women's labor she lived in Hull House. Upon meeting and getting to know Jane Addams she gained permission to hold union meetings at the house. Eventually she would establish her own co-op within the house specifically for women making low-wages. Her union organization became a part of the AFL and as a result she was elected to delegate to the Chicago Trades and Labor Assembly. Further along in 1892 she was made the first full salaried organizer for the AFL, where she was given the opportunity to travel extensively on the east coast, organizing a multitude of workers.

In the year after she was terminated Kenney would continue to work in labor organization, particularly with Florence Kelley. She also worked on women's suffrage while in Chicago, a bill which unfortunately did not pass.

== Boston Labor ==
Kenney married a labor editor named Jack O'Sullivan in 1894. They moved to Boston and lived in Denison House, a settlement house similar to Hull House. An unusual family for the time, Mary and Jack both worked and looked after the home. Throughout their marriage O'Sullivan continued her organizing mostly through the settlement house, holding discussion groups for working women, focused on the need for solidarity. Sadly her husband died in a tragic streetcar accident in 1902.

From these discussions came the beginnings of an organization that would provide working women from varied backgrounds a central voice, enabling them to unite for better wages and conditions. This organization would be the umbrella from which women's unions could develop prosper. O'Sullivan's opportunity came in November 1903 while at an AFL convention. Labor leader and President of AFL Samuel Gompers allowed her time at the microphone to announce the founding of the National Women's Trade Union League (WTUL). The first meeting included women from many previously established unions, as well as settlement house leaders and reformists. Mary Kenney O'Sullivan would be made secretary of the organization.

O'Sullivan's work for women included not only union organization but voting rights as well. In 1906 she spoke to a voting committee in the U.S. House of Representatives on the Constitutional amendment giving women the vote. She argued that women were producers in American society, and that every producer retains the right to vote. Similarly the WTUL was considered the "industrial branch" of the suffrage movement. When the AFL renewed its support of a Constitutional Amendment for suffrage every year O'Sullivan often announced its support. She wrote a circular (circa 1913-1915) for the National American Woman Suffrage Association entitled 'Why the Working Woman Needs the Vote'

== Lawrence Textile Strike ==
Her time with the WTUL came to an end in 1912 during the Lawrence Textile Strike. Initially the WTUL was able to offer support, opening a relief station providing strikers with survival goods, O'Sullivan was made the operator. However the AFL was opposed to the strike. The Industrial Workers of the World (IWW), a rival union organization which held opposing viewpoints, supported the strike. The AFL demanded that organizations under its control, which included WTUL withdraw any support. While WTUL did comply, O'Sullivan did not and stayed on with IWW. This gained her the "ire" of AFL and unfortunately the AFL also reprimanded WTUL. The relationship between both organizations was considerably rocky from this point forward.

O'Sullivan disagreed with the IWW's politics but saw merit in their organizing tactics. She was also very supportive of their inclusiveness policy. She thought that IWW's policy of including diverse ethnic and craft divisions would "lead to that 'spirit of confidence'". She played a key role in meeting with strikers and the strike committee. She even played negotiator with William Wood who was chairman of American Woolen Company. Ultimately the strike would end in favor of the workers.

== Later years ==
After O'Sullivan finished her relief work with the Lawrence Strike she went on to get legislation passed that would improve the conditions in Massachusetts's factories. She was hired in 1914 by the state as the inspector for the Massachusetts Board of Labor and Industries, a position which gave her the power to enforce the laws she helped pass. She held that position until she retired from labor organizing in 1934.

During her years as an inspector she participated in many speaking events. In 1926 she was a delegate to the Women's Peace Conference, and spoke often at Boston's Ford Hall Forum.

O'Sullivan died at 79 years old in 1943 at her home in Medford, Massachusetts. She and her husband are buried at St. Joseph's Cemetery in West Roxbury in Boston, Massachusetts.

== Tribute ==
In 1999 a series of six tall marble panels with a bronze bust in each was added to the Massachusetts State House; the busts are of O'Sullivan, Florence Luscomb, Dorothea Dix, Josephine St. Pierre Ruffin, Sarah Parker Remond, and Lucy Stone. As well, two quotations from each of those women (including O'Sullivan) are etched on their own marble panel, and the wall behind all the panels has wallpaper made of six government documents repeated over and over, with each document being related to a cause of one or more of the women.
