= List of active settlement houses =

This is a list of active settlement houses. It includes settlement houses in England, Australia, Canada, and the United States so far.

Name	Location	Country
The Arab American Family Support Center	New York, New York	United States
Alexandra Neighbourhood House	South Surrey, British Columbia	Canada
Association House of Chicago	Chicago, Illinois	United States
Association of Neighbourhood Houses of British Columbia	British Columbia	Canada
Barton Hill Settlement	Bristol	England
Benton House	Chicago, Illinois	United States
Bethany House of Laredo	Laredo, Texas	United States
Blackfriars Settlement (formerly Women's University Settlement)	Blackfriars, London	England
BronxWorks	Bronx, New York	United States
Cabbage Patch Settlement House	Louisville, Kentucky	United States
Cambridge House	Southwark, London	England
Central Community House	Columbus, Ohio	United States
Central Neighbourhood House	Toronto	Canada
Charles Settlement House	Rochester, New York	United States
Chicago Commons	Chicago, Illinois	United States
Clintonville-Beechwold Community Resources Center (CRC)	Columbus, Ohio	United States
College Settlement of Philadelphia and Henry J. & Willemina B. Kuhn Day Camp	Philadelphia, Pennsylvania	United States
Columbus Federation of Settlements	Columbus, Ohio	United States
East Side House Settlement	Bronx, New York	United States
The Educational Alliance	New York, New York	United States
Franklin-Wright Settlements, Inc	Detroit, Michigan	United States
Friendly Inn Settlement House	Cleveland, Ohio	United States
Gladden Community House	Columbus, Ohio	United States
Godman Guild Association	Columbus, Ohio	United States
Grace Hill Settlement House	St. Louis, Missouri	United States
Grand Street Settlement	New York, New York	United States
Greenwich House, Inc.	New York, New York	United States
Guardian Angel Settlement Association	St. Louis, Missouri	United States
Hamilton-Madison House	New York, New York	United States
Hartley House	New York, New York	United States
Henry Street Settlement	New York, New York	United States
The House of The Seven Gables Settlement	Salem, Massachusetts	United States
Hudson Guild	New York, New York	United States
Jacob A. Riis Neighborhood Settlement	Long Island City, New York	United States
John Hope Settlement House	Providence, Rhode Island	United States
Jones Memorial Community Center	Chicago Heights, Illinois	United States
Katherine Low Settlement	Battersea, London	England
Kingdom House	St. Louis, Missouri	United States
Kingsbridge Heights Community Center	The Bronx, New York	United States
Kingsley House	New Orleans, Louisiana	United States
Lady Margaret Hall Settlement	London	England
Lenox Hill Neighborhood House	New York, New York	United States
Lessie Bates Davis Neighborhood House	East St. Louis, Illinois	United States
Letchworth Settlement	Nevells Road, Garden City, Herts.	United Kingdom
Lincoln Square Neighborhood Center	New York, New York	United States
Lutheran Settlement House	Philadelphia, Pennsylvania	United States
Manchester Settlement	Manchester	England
The Matthew House	Fort Collins, Colorado	United States
The Music Settlement	Cleveland, Ohio	United States
The Neighborhood House	Columbus, Ohio	United States
Northwestern University Settlement House	Chicago, Illinois	United States
Oxford House	London	England
Palama Settlement	Honolulu, Hawaii	United States
Phyllis Wheatley Community Center	Minneapolis, Minnesota	United States
Pillsbury United Communities	Minneapolis, Minnesota	United States
Queens Community House	Forest Hills, New York	United States
Riverdale Neighborhood House	Bronx, New York	United States
St. Christopher House	Toronto	Canada
St. Stephen’s Community House	Columbus, Ohio	United States
The Shack Neighborhood House	Scott's Run, West Virginia	United States
Stanton Street Settlement	New York, New York	United States
Sydney University Settlement	Darlington	Australia
Toynbee Hall	Whitechapel, London	England
Union Settlement Association	East Harlem, New York	United States
United Neighborhood Houses of New York	New York, New York	United States
University Settlement Cleveland	Cleveland, Ohio	United States
University Settlement House	New York, New York	United States
Wolff Settlement dba Cornerstone Family Ministries	Tampa, Florida	United States
Rosa Valdez Settlement	Tampa, Florida	United States

== See also ==
- List of historical settlement houses
