= Houchen Settlement House =

Coordinates: 31.7551°N 106.4769°W

The Houchen Settlement House was founded in 1912 in El Segundo Barrio in El Paso, Texas.

The settlement movement was a reformist social movement that began in the 1880s and peaked around the 1920s in England and the United States. Its goal was to bring the rich and the poor of society together in both physical proximity and social interconnectedness. Its main object was the establishment of "settlement houses" in poor urban areas, in which volunteer middle-class "settlement workers" would live, hoping to share knowledge and culture with, and alleviate the poverty of, their low-income neighbours. The settlement houses provided services such as daycare, education, and healthcare to improve the lives of the poor in these areas.

== Background ==
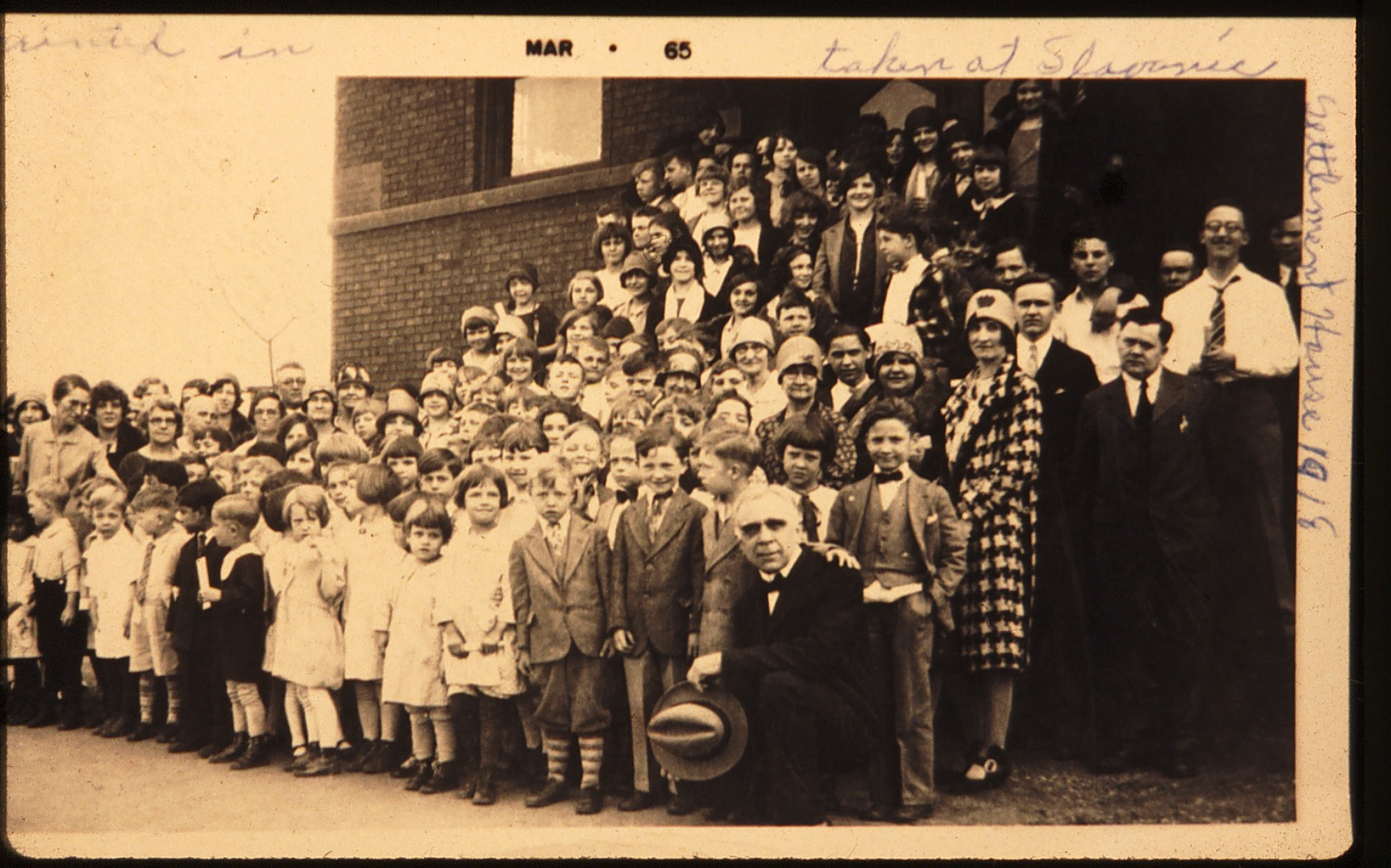
Bohemian immigrant youth at the Lessie Bates Davis Neighborhood House in 1918 in East St. Louis, Illinois

Between 1890 and 1910, more than 12 million European people immigrated to the United States. They came from Ireland, Russia, Italy and other European countries and provided cheap factory labor, a demand that was created with the country's expansion into the west following the Civil War. Many immigrants lived in crowded and disease-ridden tenements, worked long hours, and lived in poverty. Children often worked to help support the family. Jacob Riis wrote How the Other Half Lives about the lives of immigrants on New York City's Lower East Side to bring greater awareness of the immigrant's living conditions.

Famous settlements houses in the United States include Chicago's Hull House, founded by Jane Addams and Ellen Gates Starr in 1889 Denison House in Boston (1892), Lenox Hill Neighborhood House, founded in 1894, Henry Street Settlement, founded in 1893, Hiram House, founded in 1896, Houchen House, founded in 1912 and University Settlement House, founded in 1886 and the oldest in the United States, were, like Hull House, important sites for social reform. These and other settlement houses inspired the establishment of settlement schools to serve isolated rural communities in Appalachia, such as the Hindman Settlement School in 1902 and the Pine Mountain Settlement School in 1913.

By 1913, there were 413 settlements in 32 states. By the 1920s, there were almost 500 settlement houses in the country. The settlement house concept was continued by Dorothy Day's Catholic Worker "hospitality houses" in the 1930s.

American settlement houses functioned on a philosophy of “scientific philanthropy,” a belief that instead of giving direct relief, charities should give resources to the poor so they could break out of the circle of poverty. American charity workers feared that the deeply entrenched social class system in Europe would develop in the United States.

== Foundation ==
The Houchen Settlement House was founded in 1912 in Segundo Barrio in El Paso, Texas. El Paso was the chosen site to place a settlement house for Mexican immigrants because of its border location and risks linked with it. Poverty, education and high infant mortality were concerns Houchen staff had to contend with on a daily basis. With the Mexican Revolution creating uncertainty in the eyes of many Mexican citizens, El Paso was the rational move for many. Known as the Ellis Island for Mexican immigrants, Segundo Barrio's Mexican American populous exploded in the early twentieth century. In 1900, El Paso's Mexican community numbered only 8,748 residents, but by 1930 this population had swelled to 68,476. Mexican immigration into the U.S. is a common occurrence. Many Mexican Americans ancestors could potentially have a history in this specific location, making it ideal for the Houchen House. Methodist missionaries opened the Houchen Settlement as a community driven establishment that wanted to improve the lives of Segundo Barrio's citizens. They attempted to gain the trust of residents by serving the surrounding community by providing public health care, combating poverty and opening a day school for children. Houchen had “two initial goals: (1) Provide a roominghouse for single Mexicana wage earners and (2) open a kindergarten for area children. Houchen’s staff was geared toward assimilating Mexican American immigrants into mainstream American society. As the missionary was geographically placed on the border land of Mexico and the United States, Methodist staff embraced the idea of the melting pot. Dorothy Little, a Methodist missionary that served Houchen House states, “Houchen Settlement stands as a sentinel of friendship… between the people of America and the people of Mexico. We assimilate the best of their culture, their art, their ideals and they in turn gladly accept the best America has to offer as they… become one with us. For right here in our four walls is begun much of the “Melting” process of our “Melting Pot." Due to their religious and assimilation programs, many claim the Houchen House attempted to convert Mexican women and children to Methodism. Missionaries thought little of Catholicism and structured their curricula around Christian Americanization. This agenda was aimed toward the Mexican American youth and women who attended Houchen's medical and educational services. “While these programs did not regard immigrants as permanently alien to American society, they did look on their languages, religions, and cultural practices as foreign. Anglo missionaries faced challenges throughout their work during the early years by trying to attract Mexican American's to their programs and gain the trust of the Segundo Barrio populace. “They met resistance from community members not because of what they offered or stood for with relation to education and social change, but because of their association with Protestantism. Even though Houchen provided exceptional medical care and children's activities, Mexican American women utilized the House's services without losing sight of their Mexican heritage. Although, many mothers were reluctant to allow their children to attend Houchen programs, or even play on the Houchen public playground. “Thus, while the settlement's playground and programs were tempting, particularly to children, many mothers refused to allow their children to participate because of their association with Protestantism. Most notable was how Houchen evolved into a trusted community center by the Mexican American women who attended the House as children. Some Mexican American women became nurses working for the Freeman Clinic and Newark Maternity Hospital, while others became day teachers to the community's adolescents. While working within the Houchen establishments, these key women adopted new practices that led to a more trusting institution for the better of their community.

== Health care ==
For several decades, the Woman's Home Missionary Society (WHMS) was the only means of medical and social services in Segundo Barrio. They worked out of the settlement house's bathroom providing basic health care at an affordable cost and offering classes in hygiene and nutrition to the general public. The WHMS of Houchen also provided personalized visits to homes throughout the community conducting health and welfare checks. Often time's missionaries lacked the appropriate knowledge on more serious injuries and illnesses. When faced with dilemmas outside their scope of practice, they informed physicians to treat the sick and injured, thus becoming easily accessible facilitators for medical care within Segundo Barrio. In 1921 the temporary medical center at Houchen moved out of the bathroom and into a rented space. Known as the Freeman Clinic, this move was a step forward in creating a more productive medical practice for the surrounding community. Freeman Clinic gained attention and WHMS organizations around the nation donated medical supplies and equipment. “This move represented the first separation of the medical and settlement work and began a gradual reprioritization of the WHMS work in El Paso. Freeman Clinic offered residents medical care with an emphasis on pediatrics, maternal health, and infant care. However conflicts arose as patient numbers began to rise and the need for trained medical staff became a concern. Missionaries often acted as an authority in regards to maternal issues and childcare, yet lacked the knowledge of raising a family on a tight budget like many mothers in the community. This authoritative status became problematic for many Mexican American women. “Quite understandably, therefore, the Mexican American women whose homes settlement and clinic works visited and sought to uplift were not convinced that women without children and families really knew best and resisted missionary ideas. By 1937 enough money was raised to open the Newark Methodist Maternity Hospital, which furthered infant services, prenatal care, and delivery. In an evolving process to meet the healthcare of Segundo Barrio's needs, Mexican American women became nurses. Julie Gallegos began working for Newark Maternity Hospital, which was part of the Houchen Settlement House. Gallegos worked for 58 years with the surrounding community doing everything from working with senior citizens to teaching classes in nutrition before retiring. It is estimated that Gallegos has delivered thousands of babies during her employment at Newark Maternity Hospital, including one on a street corner a block from the clinic. Mexican American women like Gallegos helped the clinic overcome many interracial obstacles during her time by creating a trusted and welcoming environment. In an El Paso Times newspaper article, the executive director of Houchen, Kathy Jewell expressed her gratitude to Gallegos by stating; “Julie is probably the shining example of how Houchen has reinvented itself. She's gone from being a midwife in the clinic to running classes for people, and to the senior citizen program, and now into a new journey in her life. Gallegos, like many other Mexican American women fostered an environment that met the needs of Mexican American's in El Paso. Soon after, Catholic priests were able to perform baptisms inside the hospital when they were not allowed to do so before. “It is no coincidence that these changes occurred at a time when Latinas held a growing number of staff positions. Like Gallegos, their ability to understand the hardships of immigration, cultural affairs, and raising a family on a budget provided a more in tune system of trusting medical practices.

== Education ==
The Houchen Settlement House provided children who attended their Americanization programs an opportunity to learn various activities. Some of these included learning to read, write and speak English fluently. Houchen even provided a bilingual kindergarten class for a smooth transition from Spanish to English for their students, before reaching an English only first grade. The classroom offered a familiar and welcoming environment, as it was decorated with Mexico's national colors. “When the kindergarten opened in 1912, its room was decorated in red, white, and green (the Mexican national colors) as well as with the American flag. The kindergarten class also met another community need by providing childcare for dual working parents. Staff did not belittle the Spanish language and many became fluent Spanish speakers. Houchen missionaries worked diligently to express they were providing services and not charity to Segundo Barrio's residents. They charged a small fee for students and adults participating in extra curricular classes. These fees acted as an investment on behalf of the individual, their family, and overall community. The fee also “helped support programming, allowed it to be relatively self-sustaining, and reduced Houchen's economic dependence on the annual appropriations and solicited donations. The view of Houchen was to create a healthy community. One way of achieving this goal was to open a gymnasium class for boys and girls from age 8-16. Both girls and boys who attended learned about proper posture, developed muscles form various activities, and discussed the importance of sanitation. Themed parties were regularly scheduled for students. They presented opportunities for young men and women to enjoy each other's company in a chaperoned environment. “From the perspective of the missionaries, these parties were situations a little more like God intended young men and women to live. These festivities also acted as situations many Euro American young men and women enjoyed, which in turn gave Houchen students a taste of American life. Many students who attended the Houchen youth programs returned as adults to work with the House and their community. “Elizabeth Soto, for example, attended Houchen programs throughout her childhood and adolescence. On graduation from Bowie High School, she entered Asbury College to train as a missionary and then returned to El Paso as a Houchen resident. Missionaries provided an environment of encouragement, as they pushed their youth to pursue higher education.

== Key Mexican-American women ==
From the beginning when Houchen first opened its doors in 1912, Anglo missionary women composed the majority of the staff. The first Mexican American woman to be hired at the Settlement House was Ofilia Chavez who acted as a student helper for the schools youth. With the exception of individual Mexican American women such as Ofilia Chavez, until 1950 Chicanas had little say on how Houchen conducted its day-to-day operations. Over the span of Houchen, Latinas began to make their way through the ranks of the House's staff. The number of Mexican American women that gained these positions rose to seven by 1950. “Mary Lou López, María Rico, Elizabeth Soto, Febe, Bonilla, Clara Sarmiento, María Payan, and Beatrice Fernandez had participated in Methodist outreach activities as children and had decided to follow in the footsteps of their teachers. These young Latina's proved to be Houchen success stories. Later, they helped establish new procedures that led to the greatest changes in Houchen's policies. Many of the residents who called Segundo Barrio home finally saw an ethnic ally inside the mission. This growing Latina staff helped introduce necessary changes that forwarded a realistic approach of Houchen as a social service for Segundo Barrio instead of a religious mission. Their identities as young Mexican American women permitted them to bond with the community and their students in a way that their Anglo counterparts were unable to do. Catholic priests were permitted to come and perform baptisms on newborn infants at the parent's request. “Client desire became the justification for allowing Catholic clergy, a policy that would have been unthinkable in the not too distant past. Activities within the House also became more linked with the Mexican American populous it served. Two LULAC chapters were introduced through the Houchen Settlement House in the 1950s, one for adults and one for teenagers. Gender based courses such as carpentry were now available to young women, however they were broken into segregated classrooms.
