= Hoerr =

Hoerr is a German surname. Notable people with the surname include:

- Irv Hoerr (born 1946), American racing driver
- John Hoerr (1930–2015), American journalist and historian
- Lucile Hoerr Charles (1903–1965), American drama scholar, college professor

== See also ==
- Horr (disambiguation)
