= List of historical settlement houses =

This is a list of historical settlement houses. There were notable historic settlement houses in both England and the United States, at least.

Name	Location	Country
Amity Church Settlement	Manhattan, New York City	United States
Bermondsey Settlement	East London	England
Christodora House	Alphabet City, Manhattan, New York City	United States
Clintonville-Beechwold Community Resources Center	Columbus, Ohio	United States
Downtown Community House	Little Syria, Manhattan, New York City	United States
Friendly Inn Settlement House	Cleveland, Ohio	United States
Friendly Inn Settlement, Inc.	Cleveland, Ohio	United States
Godman Guild Association	Columbus, Ohio	United States
Hiram House	Cleveland, Ohio	United States
Holy Child Settlement	Poplar, East London	England
Hull House	Chicago, Illinois	United States
John Stewart Settlement House	Gary, Indiana	United States
North East Neighborhood House	Minneapolis, Minnesota	United States
Girls' Club of San Francisco	San Francisco, California	United States
Whittier House	Jersey City, New Jersey	United States

== See also ==
- List of active settlement houses
- List of settlement houses in Chicago
