= Louise Brigham =

American furniture designer (1875–1956)

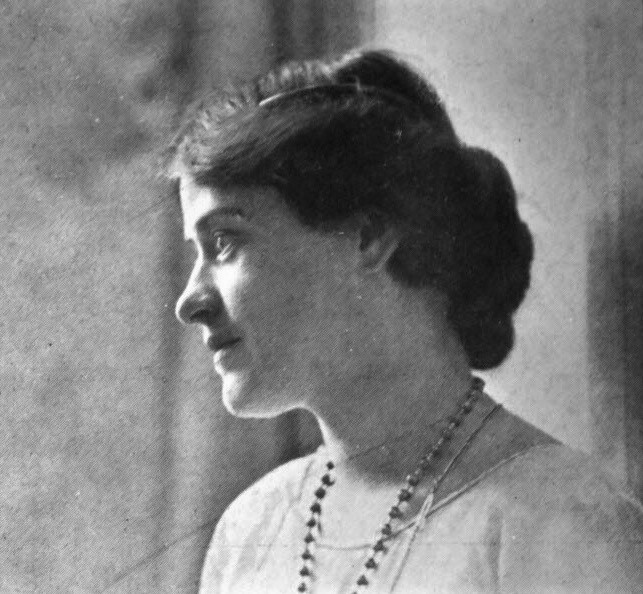
- Born: January 1, 1875; Boston, Massachusetts, U.S.
- Died: March 30, 1956 (aged 81); Trenton, New Jersey, U.S.
- Other name: Louise Brigham Chisholm
- Occupations: designer, teacher
- Spouse: Henry Arnott Chisholm (steel company executive)

Louise Brigham (January 1, 1875 – March 30, 1956) was an American early-20th-century designer and teacher. She was a pioneering champion of the use of recycled materials in furniture design. A system she invented for building furniture out of packing crates represents one of the earliest to adopt a modular approach to the design of individual units. She also founded one of the earliest ready-to-assemble furniture companies, as well as the Home Thrift Organization (HTA) to teach woodworking to New York City boys. In 1940, she received a medal from the HTA in honor of her quarter century of service to the organization.

== Early life and education ==
Louise Ashton Brigham was born in Boston, the fourth of five children of William Cleveland Brigham (b. 1840) and Maria Wilson Sheppard Brigham (b. 1845). She had an older brother, Waldo (b. 1869), and an older sister, Lucy (b. 1873). Another sister, Emma, was born four years before Louise but died in infancy. The final child of the family, Anna, was born a year after Louise. When Louise was only two years old, her mother died, and she was to lose her father when she was just 19.

Brigham studied art and design in New York at the Pratt Institute and the Chase School of Art (which became the New York School of Art in 1898 and is known today as Parsons The New School for Design), as well as at art schools in Europe.

== Career ==
At some point in the late 1890s, Brigham became involved in the settlement house movement and established Sunshine Cottage in Cleveland, Ohio. The 1900 census lists her as a teacher and "settlement worker" in Cleveland, living at Hiram House, a settlement house founded by George A. Bellamy. In the early 1900s, she founded another settlement house in Cleveland, Sunshine Cottage.

Information about Brigham’s youth and the circumstances of her upbringing is scanty. Her father was an apothecary; the 1880 census shows the family living in Medford, Massachusetts. Given that Brigham seems never to have had to work for a living and that for much of her adult life she was not supported by a husband (she did not marry until the age of 41), it seems reasonable to deduce that her family was relatively well-off for the time.

=== Travels abroad ===
During her early 30s, Brigham traveled widely in Europe, staying abroad for much of the period between 1905 and 1910. As she herself put it in a 1913 interview: "I spent the biggest part of five years in Europe, studying various kinds of handiwork with the peasants and the artists of nineteen different countries." Her destinations included the Netherlands, Germany, Denmark, and Sweden.

Highly influential for Brigham's later design work were two summers spent in a coal-mining camp on the Norwegian island of Spitsbergen, which sits well above the Arctic Circle in the Svalbard archipelago. Brigham does not precisely date these two summers in her published writings, but a reference to a visit by members of an expedition led by the American aviator Walter Wellman suggests that one of them was 1906, the year that Wellman set up headquarters in the Svalbard archipelago in an attempt to reach the North Pole by airship. Brigham stayed in a camp managed by John Munro Longyear, a fellow Bostonian of her father’s generation. In 1905, Longyear had co-founded the Arctic Coal Company to carry out mining operations in an area along the west coast of Spitsbergen that came to be called Longyear City (today Longyearbyen). The camp housed 80 men at the time Brigham was there—rising to several hundred in the years leading up to World War I—and conditions were extremely primitive. Enough food and equipment had to be brought in by ship during the summer months to supply the camp during the eight months it would be cut off from the outside world by winter ice, and the result of this stockpiling was large stacks of empty boxes. Under these difficult conditions, Brigham undertook to design what she called "box furniture" for the camp out of those cast-off packing crates, following up on some earlier experiments along the same lines.

=== Box furniture ===
In 1909, Brigham published a book of her designs for building furniture entirely out of packing crates entitled Box Furniture. Illustrated with line drawings by the interior designer Edward H. Aschermann (whom Brigham had met through their mutual friend, the Viennese Secessionist architect-designer Josef Hoffmann), Box Furniture was a how-to manual for a target audience of modestly skilled working-class householders. It offered dozens of different furniture plans, advice on how to select and break down crates, instruction in basic carpentry, and a list of necessary tools. Designs were grouped into suites for specific rooms, as well as organized along a trajectory of increasing complexity. Brigham also offered complementary advice on curtain materials and overall color schemes.

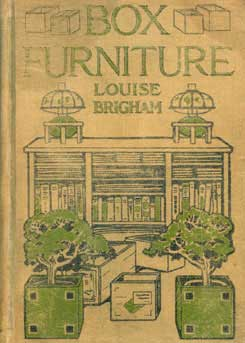
The cover of Brigham's 1909 book on creating furniture from packing crates.

In addition to working exclusively with recycled materials of the cheapest kind, Brigham planned many of her designs to be multifunctional and space-saving (a drop-leaf table, a set of nesting stools, a desk with built-in bookcases) as they were aimed primarily at urban apartment dwellers. Brigham also took a modular or sectional approach to some of her pieces, as several of the smaller pieces are designed in such a way that they can either stand alone or work as subunits of larger pieces.

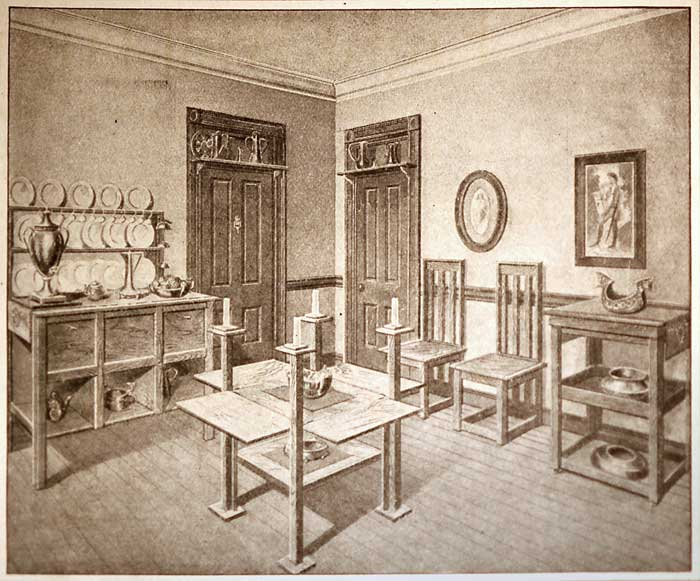
A room of furniture built according to Brigham's designs, illustrated for The Ladies' Home Journal, 1910.

Brigham specifically aligns her modernist aesthetic with that of Hoffmann, with its focus on the square as a fundamental unit of design. However, the raw surfaces and rough construction that were keystones of her approach don't become a mainstay of modern design for another two decades, when Gerrit Rietveld's crate furniture of the 1930s recapitulates Brigham's box furniture under the banner of De Stijl.

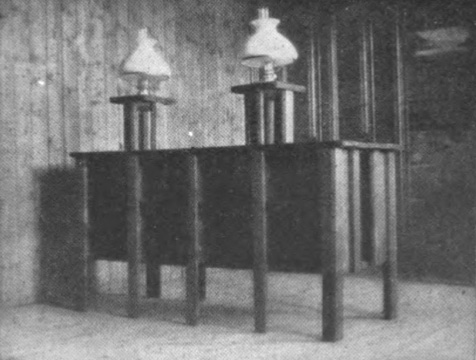
A combination desk, reading table, and bookcase built from crates during Brigham's sojourn on the island of Spitsbergen. The plans were later published in her book.

Brigham's ambitious project of combining up-to-date design with a do-it-yourself approach was both unusual in its own time and a forerunner of today's green design movement. One writer assesses Brigham's project as "a comprehensive system attached to a design theory and a social agenda".

=== Home Thrift Association ===
In 1910, Brigham showed "Room Delightful", an entire suite of box furniture for a child’s room at a Child Welfare Exhibit in New York City. Interested city officials offered Brigham the use of the then-closed Gracie Mansion for further experimentation. Brigham accepted and founded the Home Thrift Association, a woodworking "laboratory" for boys: "We give each boy a set of the seven simple tools and show him the beginnings of his work. Then he does the rest." The HTA, which later opened to girls as well, aimed "not only at thrift, but at the conservation of the home."

Initially headquartered in just two rooms of Gracie Mansion, the club quickly outgrew its space as it gained some 600 apprentices in its first year of operation. It then moved to 516 E. 89th Street, not far from Brigham’s own apartment at 539 E. 89th St., which Brigham furnished almost entirely out of box furniture made by the HTA apprentices as a kind of model showroom for the project. The total cost of the box furnishings for Brigham's apartment was around $4, or less than half of an average worker's weekly wage.

=== Ready-to-assemble furniture ===
During World War 1, Brigham founded a box furniture factory on the Lower East Side of New York. It aimed to capture the low-cost end of the emerging market in factory-made furniture while providing jobs for modestly skilled workers. It was eventually turned over the YMCA to run on behalf of returning war veterans.

Around the same time, Brigham and two partners set up Home Art Masters, a mail-order business offering ready-to-assemble furniture kits with instructions so that the item could be assembled at home with simple tools. This short-lived business was decades ahead of what are usually taken to the starting points of commercial RTA furniture, which include efforts by Australian designer Frederick Charles Ward (late 1940s), American cabinetmaker Erie J. Sauder (1953), and IKEA (1956).

== Later years ==
In part due to Brigham's teaching at the HTA and associated publicity, box furniture had something of a vogue in the years leading up to World War I. Her book went through several editions and was translated into a number of foreign languages. However, after the war information on Brigham again becomes thin. On August 21, 1916, Brigham married 64-year-old Henry Arnott Chisholm at the Mission Inn in Riverside, California. A graduate of the Harvard class of 1874, Chisholm lived in Cleveland, where he had worked for the Cleveland Rolling Mills and later become a partner in William Chisholm Steel Shovel Works.

Henry Chisholm died in 1920, and in the ensuing years Brigham worked on a new edition of her book (never published) and a memoir (since lost). In the 1930s, she became a disciple of the American healer and clairvoyant Edgar Cayce and spent much time with him and his family. She died in the Sylvan Nursing Home in Trenton, New Jersey, on March 30, 1956.

== Awards and honors ==
- 1940, medal from the HTA in honor of her quarter century of service to the organization she founded

== Publications ==
- Box Furniture: How to Make a Hundred Useful Articles for the Home. Illustrations by Edward H. Ascherman from designs by the author. New York: Century, 1909.
- "How Boys Made Toys from Boxes". St. Nicholas, vol. 42 (January 1915), p. 440.
- "How Boys Make Furniture from Boxes". St. Nicholas, vol. 42 (January 1915). Part I: p. 241. Part II: p. 339.
- "How I Furnished My Entire Flat from Boxes". Ladies' Home Journal, vol. 27. Part I: Sept. 1, 1910, pp. 70, 74. Part II (My Bedroom): Oct. 1, 1910, pp. 86, 92. Part III (My Dining Room): Nov. 1, 1910, pp. 80, 86. Part IV (My Kitchen): Dec. 1, 1910, pp. 68, 74.
- "Rugs and Baskets Which Cost Nothing". Ladies' Home Journal, August 1910.
