= Ruth Lercher Bornstein =

American children's book author and illustrator

Ruth Lercher Bornstein is an American author and illustrator of children's and young adult books, and painter.

== Biography ==
Ruth Janet Lercher grew up in Wisconsin and graduated from the University of Wisconsin-Madison in 1948 with a degree in Art Education, after which she taught art for children at the Lenox Hill Neighborhood House in New York. She later attended the Cranbrook Academy of Art in Michigan before moving with her husband, Harry Bornstein, to Los Angeles. Her first book Indian Bunny, reissued as Brave Bunny, was published in 1973.

== Books ==
- Indian Bunny, Golden Gate Junior Books, 1973; reissued as Brave Bunny, Gibbs Smith, 2003.
- Little Gorilla, Seabury Press/Clarion Books, 1976.
- The Dream of the Little Elephant, Seabury Press/Clarion, 1977
- Jim, Seabury Press/Clarion, 1978
- The Dancing Man, Seabury Press/Clarion, 1978
- I'll Draw a Meadow, Harper & Row, 1979
- Of Course a Goat, Harper & Row, 1980
- The Seedling Child, Harcourt Brace Jovanovich, 1987
- A Beautiful Seashell, Harper & Row, 1990
- Rabbit's Good News, Houghton Mifflin/Clarion, 1995
- That's How It Is When We Draw, Houghton Mifflin/Clarion, 1997
- Butterflies and Lizards, Beryl and Me, Cavendish Square Publishing, 2002
- The Summer Everything Changed, Wellstone Press, 2012
