= Nathaniel Hawthorne Birthplace =

Birthplace of Nathaniel Hawthorne

Coordinates: 42°31′17.36″N 70°53′03.11″W

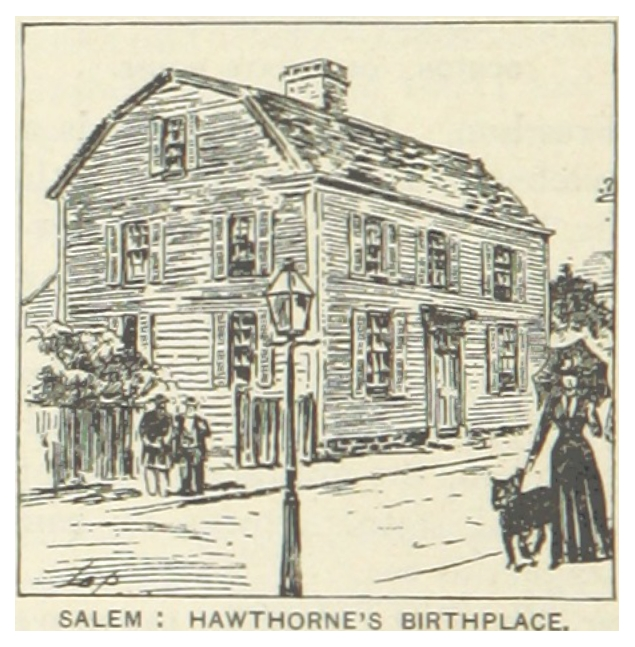
Nathaniel Hawthorne Birthplace (depicted in King's Hand-book of the United States planned and edited by M. King, 1891)

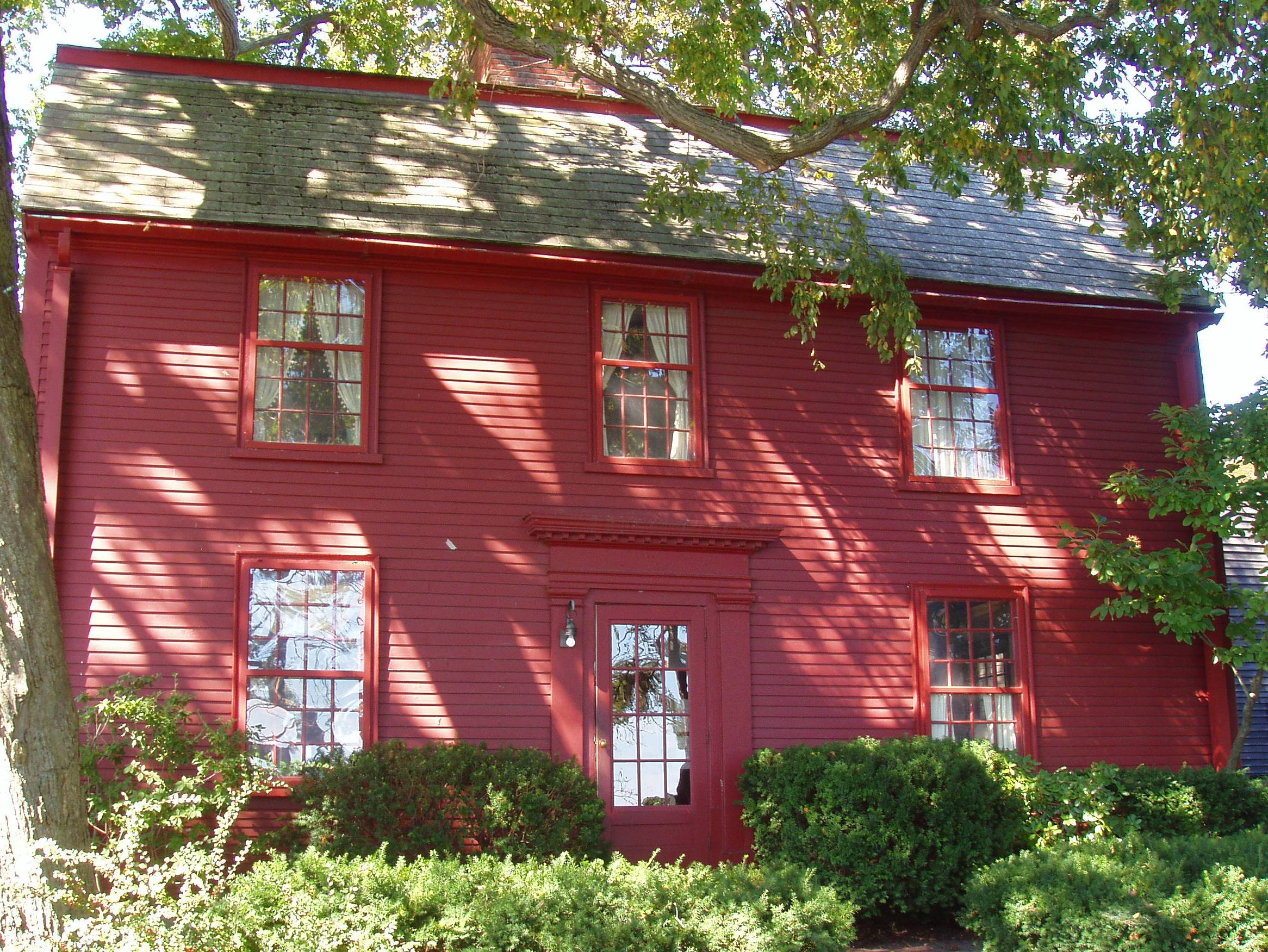
Nathaniel Hawthorne Birthplace in 2005

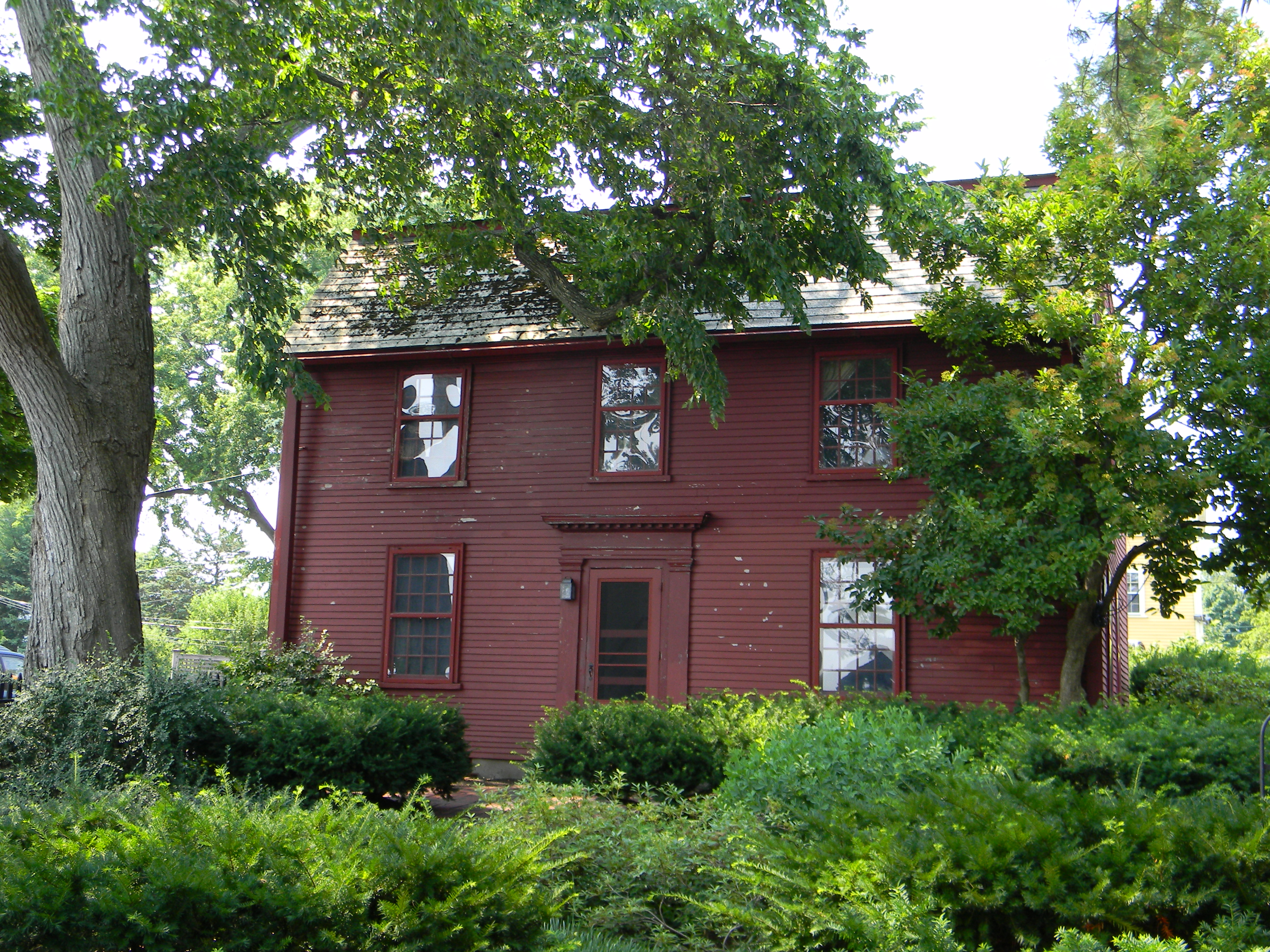
Nathaniel Hawthorne's Birthplace in 2015

The Nathaniel Hawthorne Birthplace is the home where American author Nathaniel Hawthorne was born. The structure is located in Salem, Massachusetts, having been relocated to the grounds of the House of the Seven Gables and restored by the non-profit House of the Seven Gables Settlement Association. Admission is free to Salem residents year-round and to the general public during winter months; a fee is charged during summer months.

== History ==
The house, originally standing at 27 Union Street, was built sometime between 1730 and 1745 for a Boston mariner named Joshua Pickman. The land had been deeded to Pickman by his father-in-law Joseph Hardy, and may have recycled structural timbers from a 17th-century Pickman house that earlier stood on its site. Hawthorne's grandfather Daniel Hathorne (the "w" was not yet added to the family name) lived here with his wife Rachel Phelps as early as 1765. He purchased the building in 1772.

After a courtship of more than six years, Nathaniel Hathorne Sr. married Elizabeth Clarke Manning on August 2, 1801, when the new Mrs. Hathorne was already pregnant. She had known the family for many years; only a small garden separated her own family house from the Hathorne's Union Street home. Unable to afford a home of their own, the couple moved into the Union Street house, where the groom's widowed mother and three unmarried siblings already lived. The Mannings, Hawthorne's maternal family, were wealthier and, by the time of the Hathornes' wedding, had bought most of the property on Union Street and Herbert Street.

Hawthorne was born in the house on July 4, 1804, and lived in the house until his father died at sea when the future author was four years old. The family then moved into property owned by the Mannings on Herbert Street. Sophia Peabody, who would eventually become the author's wife, moved with her family in 1812 to a home on Union Street at the Essex Street corner. The Hawthornes as a married couple would later live in Salem at 18 Chestnut Street (where son Julian Hawthorne was born) and 14 Mall Street (where The Scarlet Letter was written).

Years later, in 1853, Hawthorne wrote of his birthplace in the National Review: "I was born in the town of Salem, Massachusetts, in a house built by my grandfather, who was a maritime personage. The old household estate was in another part of the town, and had descended in the family ever since the settlement of the country; but this old man of the sea exchanged it for a lot of land situated near the wharves, and convenient to his business, where he built the house... and laid out a garden, where I rolled on a grass-plot under an apple-tree and picked abundant currants." His mother Elizabeth also described Hawthorne's birthplace in a letter to one of his daughters, circa 1865: "Your father was born in 1804, on the 4th of July, in the chamber over the little parlour in the house in Union Street, which then belonged to my grandmother [Rachel Phelps] Hathorne, who lived in one part of it... I remember that one morning my mother called my brother into her room, next to the one where we slept, and told him that his father was dead. He left very little property, and my grandfather [Richard] Manning took us home."

In 1958, the home was moved, without a later ell that had been added, to its current location at 27 Hardy Street on the grounds of the Turner-Ingersoll Mansion, which Hawthorne had made famous in his novel The House of the Seven Gables (1851).

It reflects typical architecture for the period: a central chimney, gambrel roof, front and back stairways, and a post-and-lintel doorway. The ground floor is laid out with kitchen to the right and main room to the left. The second floor has front and back rooms on each side. Most of the interior has been preserved intact.

== See also ==
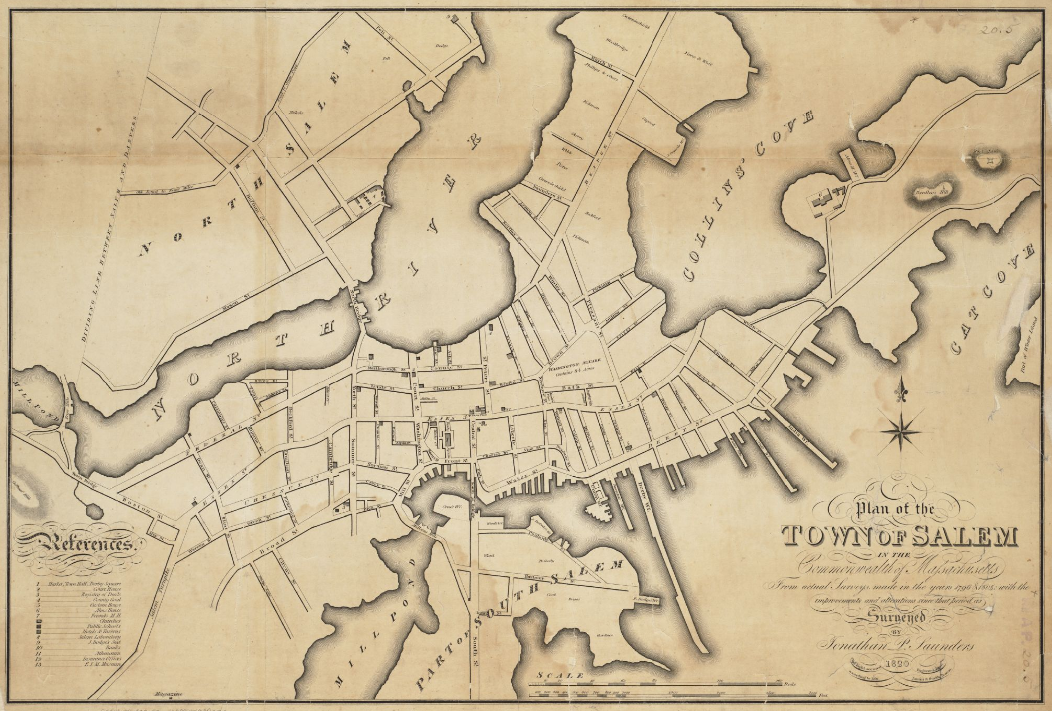
Salem - 1820

- List of historic houses in Massachusetts
- List of residences of American writers
