= Marian Pease =

University teacher and welfare worker (1859–1954)

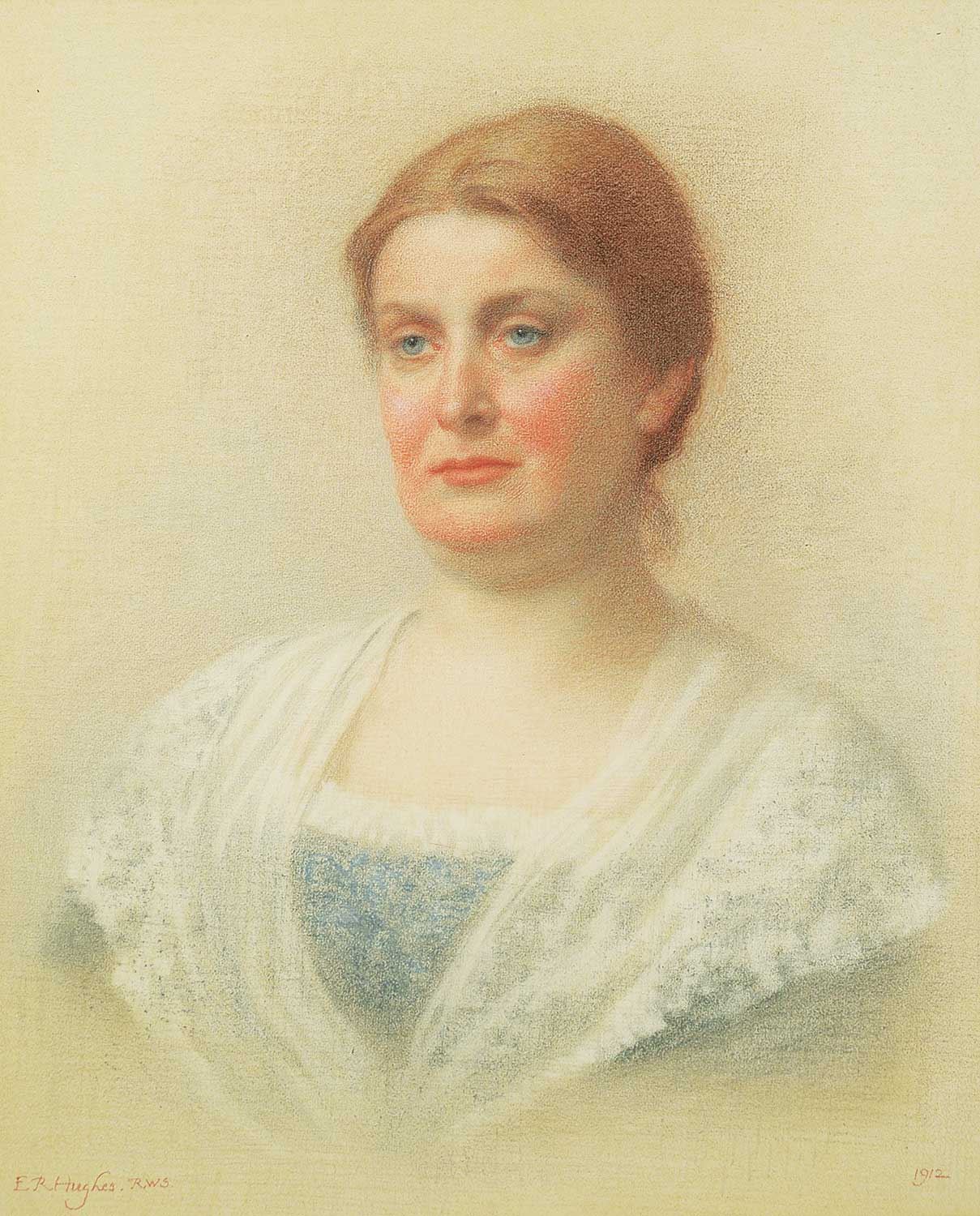
- Born: 3 April 1859; Westbury-on-Trym
- Died: 25 September 1954 (aged 95); Street
- Alma mater: University College, Bristol
- Occupation: Teacher

Marian "May" Fry Pease (3 April 1859 – 25 September 1954) was a British schoolteacher. She was one of the first women to attend University College, Bristol where she would later lecture and become a doctor of letters. She and Hilda Cashmore founded the Bristol University Settlement (later the Barton Hill Settlement).

== Life ==
Pease was born in Westbury-on-Trym the daughter of devoted Quakers, Thomas Pease (1816–1884) and Susanna Ann Fry (1829–1917; sister of the judge Edward Fry); she was one of her father's fifteen children as he had children by previous marriages. One of her brothers was the Fabian Edward R. Pease. Her father had been a wool comber and her mother came from the Fry family known for manufacturing chocolate.

When University College, Bristol took on its first female students in 1876, Pease was also one of the first three women (alongside Amy Bell and Emily Pakeman) to earn a scholarship. She obtained honours in all her subjects in 1880. She had been supported by the Clifton Association for the Higher Education of Women. Pease went on to Cambridge where she trained to be a teacher at the Cambridge Training College for Women.

By 1892 she was back at her alma mater where she lectured supporting women who wanted to be elementary teachers. In 1911, she and Hilda Cashmore founded the Bristol University Settlement. Pease was certain that teaching was important and she supported the ideals of the settlement movement. The settlement had a welfare units for infants and a school and the regional headquarters of the Works Educational Association. Students could take a two-year course in social work at the settlement which included Pease as a lecturer. Hilda Cashmore became the settlements first warden and she stayed there until 1926.

The university made her a doctor of letters in 1912 and she retired in the following year, although she returned occasionally until 1928.

Hilda Cashmore died in 1943 and the following year Pease wrote and privately published her biography, Hilda Cashmore 1876-1943.

Pease died in Street in 1954, certain that she would again see her mother. The settlement that she had co-founded in 1911 was still extant as the Barton Hill Settlement in 2020 when it merged to become part of the Wellspring Settlement.
