= Aschermann Studio =

American interior design firm

The Aschermann Studio was an interior design firm founded by Edward H. Aschermann (1878-1940) and Gladys G. Aschermann (d. 1948) that was active from 1911 to 1920. The firm is known for modernist designs emphasizing simple geometry and employing a palette of rich, vibrant colors. The Aschermanns were primarily influenced by the Vienna Secession and the Wiener Werkstätte, especially the designer Josef Hoffmann.

== Background of the partners ==
Edward H. Aschermann was born in Milwaukee to German immigrants. He studied art and design in Europe in the early 1900s, at the Académie Julian in Paris and elsewhere, including a stint in Vienna with Hoffmann. On his return to the United States, he illustrated the book Box Furniture (1909) by the Progressive designer Louise Brigham, whom he had met in Europe. Around the same time, he opened his own design studio in New York, and it was during this period that he met his future partner and wife, Gladys Goodwin.

Gladys Goodwin grew up in Halifax, Nova Scotia, and moved to New York to study art and design. Her aesthetic was influenced in part by the natural forms of Art Nouveau. By 1911, Edward and Gladys had married, and all their subsequent design work would be co-credited to "E.H. and G.G. Aschermann" or to the Aschermann Studio.

== The Aschermann Studio 1911-1915 ==
The Aschermanns began by designing their own apartment on 31st Street in New York. and using it as a showcase to get commissions. By 1914, they had redesigned it, apparently responding to critics who found their earlier design too radically modern. Already in evidence were several of their trademarks: a penchant for painting walls in rich colors like deep red and bright yellow offset by black, white, and grays; and the use of plain, factory-made furniture custom-painted to match the interior design scheme.

Many of the Aschermann Studio commissions were featured in design magazines such as Craftsman, The International Studio, The House Beautiful, Modern Art Collector, and Arts and Decoration, as well as in instructional books like The Practical Book of Furnishing the Small House and Apartment (1922). It has been argued that the Aschermanns' impact on American design was minimal because during their heyday they were slightly too far ahead of their time.

== Later years ==
The Aschermann Studio may have suffered from anti-German sentiment during World War I. After 1915 the studio carried out fewer commissions, and it effectively disappeared from the design scene around 1920.

In 1919, Edward Aschermann bought a house in Ogunquit, Maine, and the Aschermanns split their remaining years between Maine and New York. Their final commission, in the early 1930s, was the interior of the new Ogunquit Playhouse. They raised four sons during this period.

Edward died of cancer in 1940, and Gladys died eight years later.
