= North East Neighborhood House =

- U.S. National Register of Historic Places
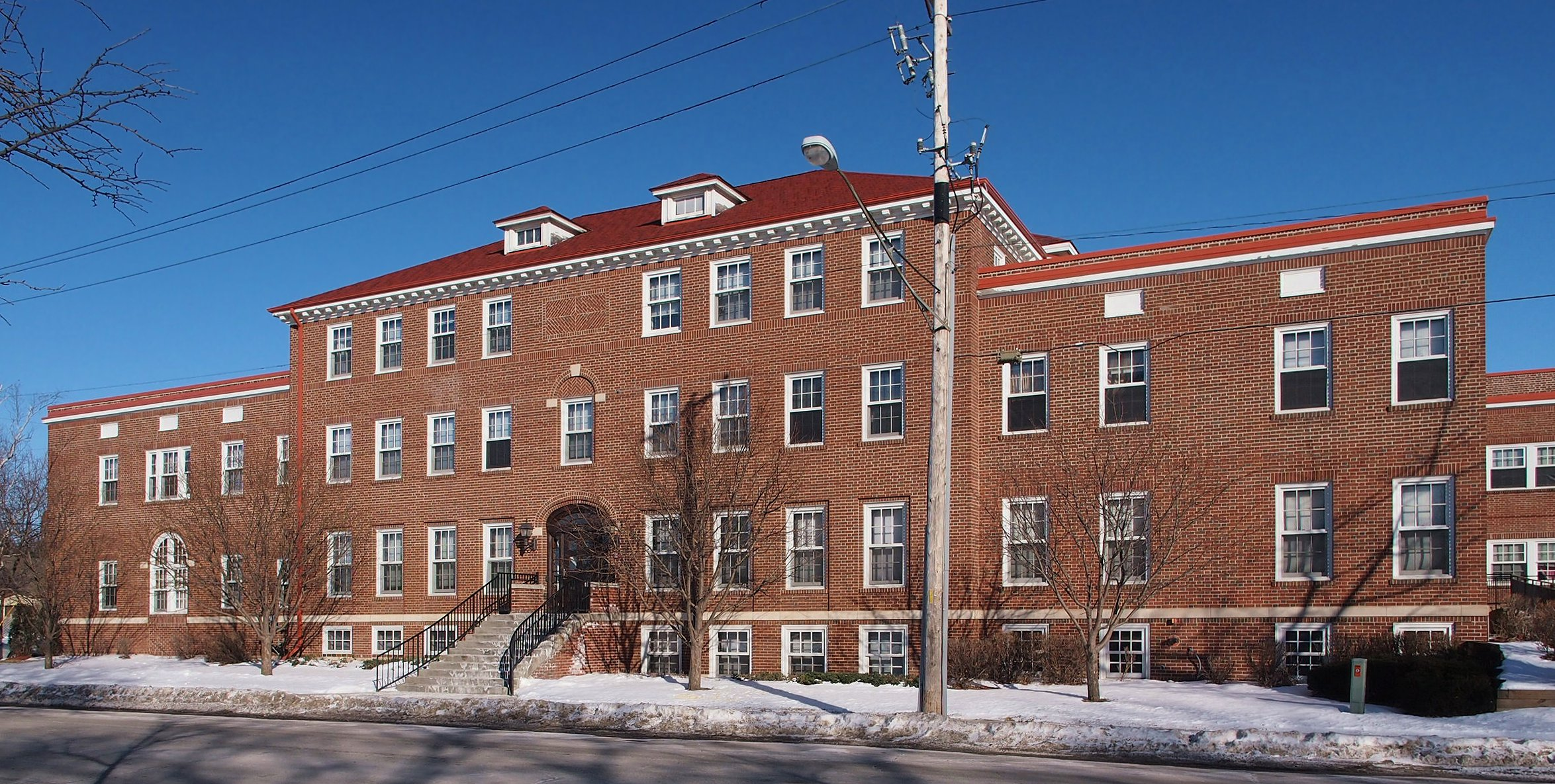
- The North East Neighborhood House from the southwest

- Location within Minnesota Location within the United States
- Location: 1929 Second Street NE, Minneapolis, Minnesota
- Coordinates: 45°0′29″N 93°15′57″W
- Built: 1919
- Architect: Kenyon and Maine; Pike and Cook
- Architectural style: Colonial Revival
- NRHP reference No.: 01000749
- Added to NRHP: July 19, 2001

North East Neighborhood House (NENH) is a building in the Northeast neighborhood of Minneapolis, Minnesota. The building housed a social services organization established in 1915 by Plymouth Church, a Minneapolis congregational church. The roots of the organization go back to Immanuel Sunday School, established in 1881 near Second Street Northeast and Broadway Street Northeast. The school later built a new building, Drummond Hall, near Second Street Northeast and 15th Avenue Northeast. The church expanded its programs to include various social services and clubs for neighborhood residents who had immigrated to Northeast Minneapolis from France, Germany, and Scandinavia. The demographics of the area had changed by the 1910s, though, and most of the newcomers were from eastern Europe. These newcomers still needed social services, but since most of them were Catholic, they were unwilling to accept Protestant religious education. The attendance dropped, forcing Drummond Hall to close in 1913.

Plymouth Church still wanted to provide social services in northeast Minneapolis, so they commissioned a study to determine what they could provide for social services. The key finding of the study was that the neighborhood needed a sense of unity, since immigrants from various ethnic groups had differences with each other. The study found that they could acquaint new immigrants with American cultural norms and provide education, health care, and recreation. The church established a settlement house and hired Robbins Gilman, who had recently been fired from University Settlement House because of his support for the Industrial Workers of the World. The house opened in the Drummond Hall building, but later moved to a new, larger building a few blocks north.

Robbins Gilman was aided by his wife, Catheryne, who was also a reformer. She influenced some of the NENH's programs but was more active in other organizations. When the NENH began operations on January 20, 1915, it was one of four settlement houses in the city. It offered classes in sewing, cooking, carpentry, and dancing. It also provided a supervised setting for the children of the neighborhood to socialize.

Robbins Gilman hired one supervisor for boys and one for girls. This allowed him to focus on his grander ideas for the facility. A program to help women find work in conjunction with a day nursery was created. Within the first three years the NENH helped over 7,000 women find work. Gilman also began a dental clinic for children. As services expanded, so did the NENH's popularity.

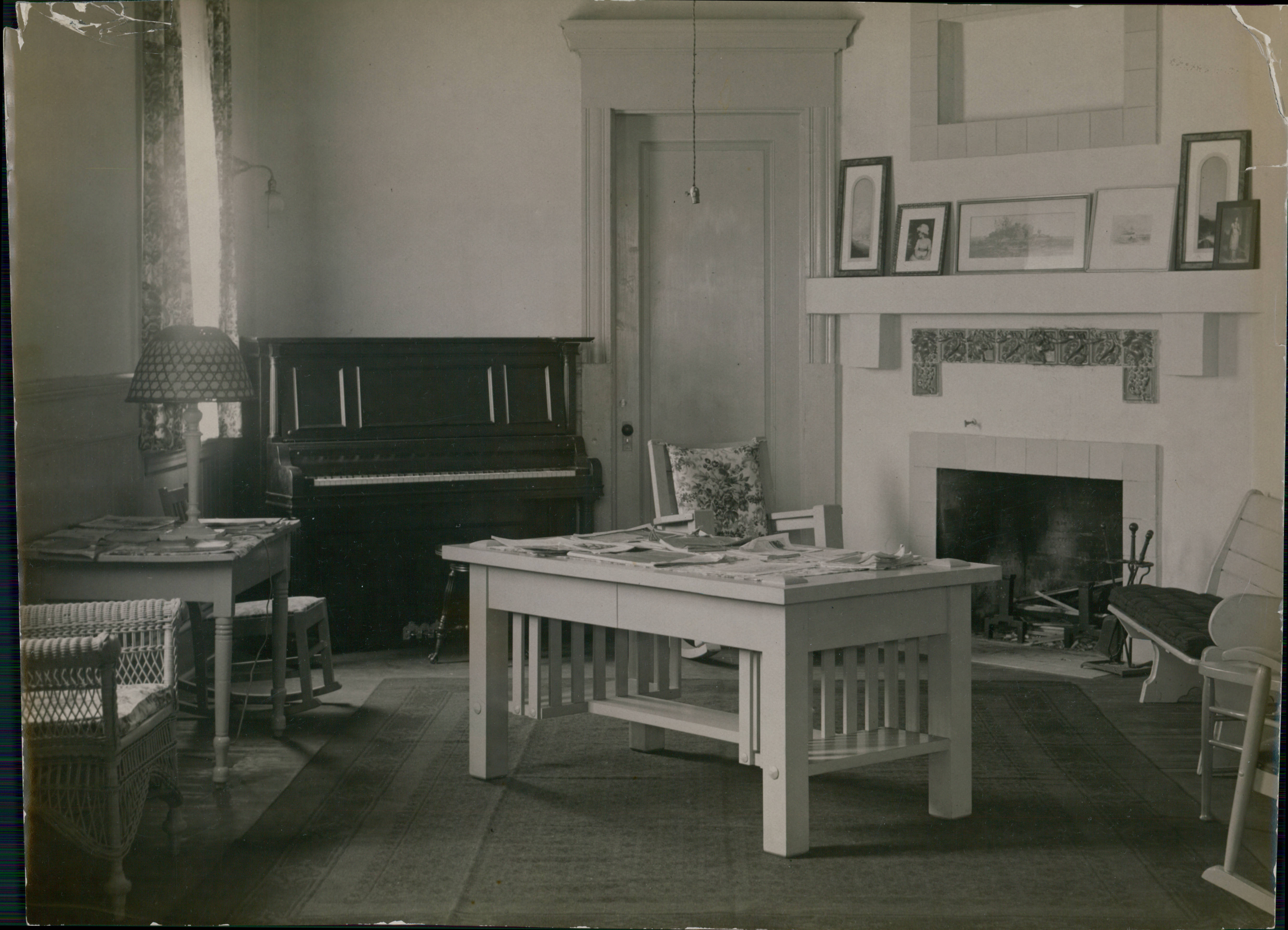
Meeting room of the Northeast Neighborhood House

In 1918 construction of a new facility in the neo-Georgian style designed by Kenyon and Main was begun. By August of the next year NENH staff had moved into the new building. During the 1920s the facility offered more services and continued to expand. Two new wings, which included a gymnasium and a dormitory, were completed in 1927. When the Great Depression hit, the NENH became a focal point for aid programs in the neighborhood.

In 1948 Gilman retired from his work at the NENH. He was succeeded by Lester Shaeffer and subsequently Joe Holewa, a native of the Northeast neighborhood. The latter half of the 20th century brought great changes to the NENH and other settlement houses. Government and well-funded private groups began dominating social services. The people who had grown up with the NENH moved out of the neighborhood; new arrivals were unfamiliar with its mission. The house continued in operation until the early 1960s, when it merged with the Margaret Barry House, another settlement house. The combined organization was renamed East Side Neighborhood Services. East Side Neighborhood Services moved out of the Georgian Revival building in 2001 and into a new, modern building. The 1919 building was renovated and now serves as apartments. It was listed on the National Register of Historic Places in 2001.

== Additional Resources ==
- The North East Neighborhood House Records are available for research use at the Minnesota Historical Society.
