= Horr (disambiguation) =

Horr is a book by the Iranian author Ali Shariati.

Horr may also refer to:

- Head of the River Race (HORR), a processional rowing race held annually on the Thames in London
- Roswell G. Horr (1830–1896), U.S. Representative from Michigan
- Ralph Horr (1884–1960), U.S. Representative from Washington
- Horr, Iran, a city in Khuzestan Province
- Horr Rural District, in Kermanshah Province, Iran

== See also ==
- Hurr (disambiguation)
