= Hilda Cashmore =

University teacher and welfare worker (1876–1943)

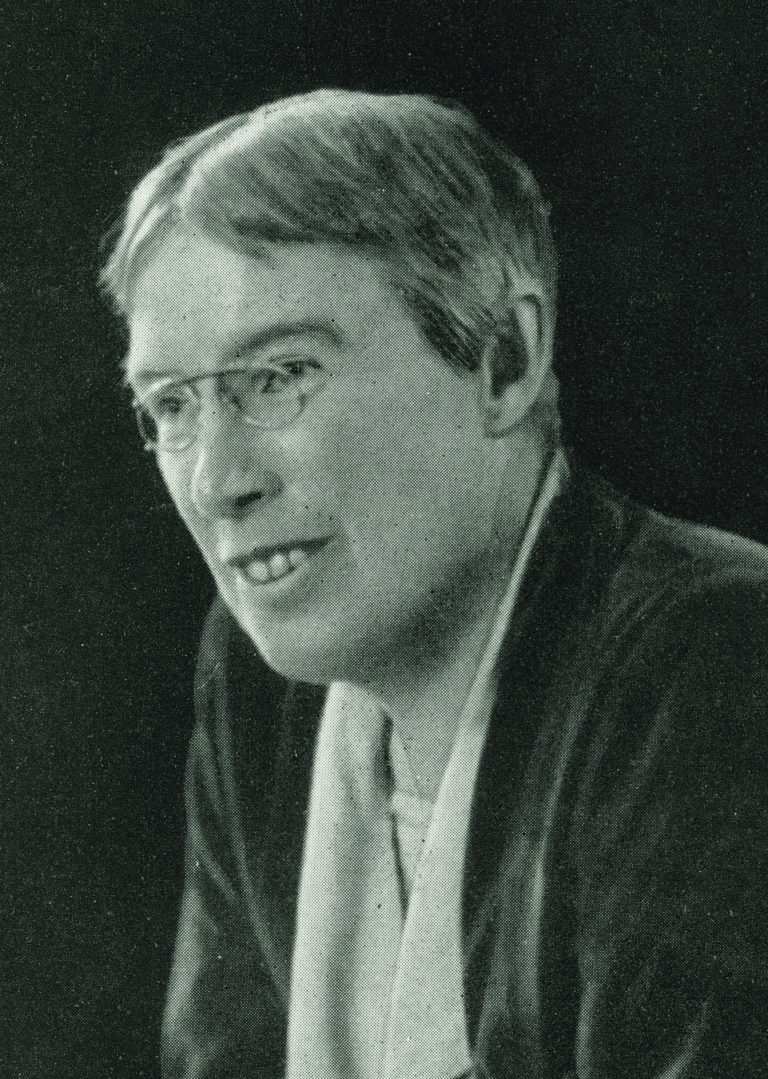
- Born: 22 August 1876; Norton Malreward
- Died: 15 November 1943 (aged 67); Woolwich
- Alma mater: Cheltenham Ladies' College; Somerville College
- Employer: University College, Bristol

Hilda Cashmore (1876 – 1943) was a Quaker who founded the Bristol University Settlement which was later known as the Barton Hill Settlement.

== Life ==
Cashmore was born in 1876 at Norton House in Norton Malreward. She was the penultimate child of six born to Mary, (previously Edmunds) and Samuel Cashmore. Her father was a Liberal merchant who believed in free trade. She went to Cheltenham Ladies College before she went to Somerville College to study modern history. She graduated in 1902 with a second class degree.

She was employed at Bristol University College's Women's Day Training College.

When the Bristol University Settlement opened in Bristol's Barton Hill she was the first warden. Bristol University Settlement was founded by Marian Pease and Cashmore in 1911. Cashmore was the main promoter and she saw the settlement achieving dual aims of assisting the welfare to the area and as a base for studies of the area. Other settlements had tried to partner with universities but Cashmore aimed for a strong link. A training syllabus was established for a course in social work and Cashmore was responsible for the course's practical work.

She became the chair of the British Association of Residential Settlements in 1920. She also worked in 1920 in Galicia during the Polish–Soviet War as part of the Friends' War Victims Relief Committee where she helped to reduce typhus.

She served in Bristol until 1926 when she left Bristol to lead the Manchester University Settlement in the poor area of Ancoats and to teach students taking a social study diploma. She returned in 1934 to Somerset which she preferred.

== Death and legacy ==
Cashmore died in 1943 and the following year Marian Pease wrote and privately published a biography, Hilda Cashmore 1876-1943.

On International Women's Day in 2023 a blue plaque was unveiled in Bristol. The plaque is near the Cashmore House flats and Cashmore Early Years Centre nursery which are also named for her.

Helen Mellor's biography, Hilda Cashmore: Pioneering Community Worker and Founder of Bristol's Barton Hill Settlement was published in 2021 by the Bristol Radical History Group.
