= Bethany House of Laredo =

Non-profit organization in Laredo, TX, US

Bethany House of Laredo is a non-profit organization based in Laredo, Texas, USA, serving homeless people, disabled people, impoverished people, elderly people and veterans Laredo and Webb County. The organization runs several centers providing shelters and services for homeless people and other vulnerable groups.

== History ==
Bethany House was founded in 1982 by Father Charles M. McNaboe, a Roman Catholic priest, and registered as a non-profit organization in 1984. The organization was initially housed in the former Texas Hat Company building. In 2002 an additional site was opened to create a homeless shelter (the Lamar Bruni Vergara Community Shelter) and transitional housing service (Guadalupe and Lilia Martinez Resource Center). The organization moved to 817 Hidalgo Street in 2009, and their Barbara A. Kazen Center Center for Hope was opened in 2014.

== Services ==
Services provided include:

- Onsite Meals Program
- Meal delivery service
- Case Management Program (assessment and referral to medical, mental health, social, employment, job training, and life skills support services)
- Emergency homeless shelters (Bethany House Emergency Shelters, Lamar Bruni Vergara Emergency Shelter, Barbara A. Kazen Center for Hope)
- Transitional housing for homeless people
- Rapid rehousing
- Homelessness prevention
- Guadalupe and Lilia Martinez Resource Center (including provision of sanitary, washing and laundry facilities, telephones, drinking water, a children's library and study space)
- Clothing Center and Thrift Shop
- Food Pantry
- Kid's Café
- Luz De Esperanza-Learning Program (Saturday school)
- After-school tuition
- Community Health and Service Fair
- Faith-based services

== Partnerships ==
Bethany House is a member of the "Laredo Homeless Coalition".
