= Lucile Hoerr Charles =

American college professor

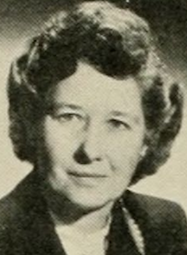
- Lucile Hoerr Charles, from the 1951 yearbook of East Carolina University
- Born: Lucile Marie Hoerr; August 13, 1903; Chicago, Illinois, U.S.
- Died: March 7, 1965 (aged 61); Cleveland, Ohio, U.S.
- Occupations: College professor, theatre professional, folklorist

Lucile Marie Hoerr Charles (August 13, 1903 – March 7, 1965) was an American college professor, theatre professional, and folklorist. She was the first director of dramatic arts at East Carolina University. Her scholarship focused on clowns, and on drama as an aspect of naming and other rituals. Later in life, she wrote about her own medical issues, and promoted a slower, gentler way to remove adhesive bandages.

== Early life and education ==
Hoerr was born in Chicago, the daughter of Charles Ferdinand Hoerr and Lillie Anna Sophia Obermann Hoerr. Her younger brother Stanley became a prominent surgeon. She studied piano as a girl, and graduated from the University of Chicago in 1930, where she wrote for the Daily Maroon. She earned master's degrees from Columbia University in 1941, and Yale University in 1942. She completed her Ph.D. in educational psychology at Yale in 1943. From 1955 to 1957, she held a Bollingen Foundation fellowship for further study at the C. G. Jung Institute in Zürich.

Hoerr began using her father's first name, Charles, as her surname in adulthood.

== Career ==
Charles worked at Lenox Hill Neighborhood House in New York City from 1930 to 1934, and taught at the American Peoples College in Europe from 1934 to 1936. She worked in the drama and speech department at Teachers College, Columbia University from 1937 to 1939. She also produced a radio drama series, The Land of Plenty, while she was based in New York City, and appeared in a Broadway show, Life Begins (1933).

Charles was on the faculty of Mary Washington College from 1943 to 1946, then became a professor of English at East Carolina University. She became a full professor in 1959. As the school's first director of dramatic arts, she directed three major plays per term and weekly one-act plays, and produced radio shows. She founded the Eastern Regional Play Festival, held on campus and welcoming theatre professionals from throughout the region. She also directed an annual children's play at East Carolina Playhouse.

== Publications ==
- "Snaring the Elusive Broadway Job" (1930)
- "So You're Going on the Stage" (1931)
- "And for a Backdrop the Tyrolean Alps!" (1935)
- "The Clown's Function" (1945)
- "Growing up Through Drama" (1946)
- "Regeneration Through Drama at Death" (1948)
- "Drama in First-Naming Ceremonies" (1951)
- "Drama in Shaman Exorcism" (1953)
- "Drama in War" (1955)
- The Story of the Baby Sphinx and Other Fables (1959)
- "Removing the Patient from the Tape" (1960)
- "How to avoid pain in removing adhesive tape" (1961)
- "Morale in Recovering from Guillain-Barré Disease: Account of an Ex-patient" (1961)

== Personal life ==
Charles was public about her experiences with Guillain-Barré disease. Her writing about the psychological toll of this disease was published in multiple periodicals. She died in 1965, at the age of 61, at the Cleveland Clinic, where her brother was a surgeon. Her papers are in the manuscript collection of East Carolina University.
