= Settlement movement =

Reformist social movement that began in the 1880s in England and the US

The settlement movement was a reformist social movement that began in the 1880s and peaked around the 1920s in the United Kingdom and the United States. Its main object was the establishment of settlement houses in poor urban areas, in which volunteer middle-class "settlement workers" would live, hoping to share knowledge and culture with, and alleviate the poverty of, their low-income neighbors. The settlement houses provided services such as daycare, English classes, and healthcare to improve the lives of the poor in these areas. The settlement movement also spawned educational/reform movements. Both in the United Kingdom and the United States, settlement workers worked to develop a unique activist form of sociology known as Settlement Sociology. This science of the social movement is neglected in the history of sociology in favor of a teaching-, theory- and research university–based model.

== History ==
=== United Kingdom ===
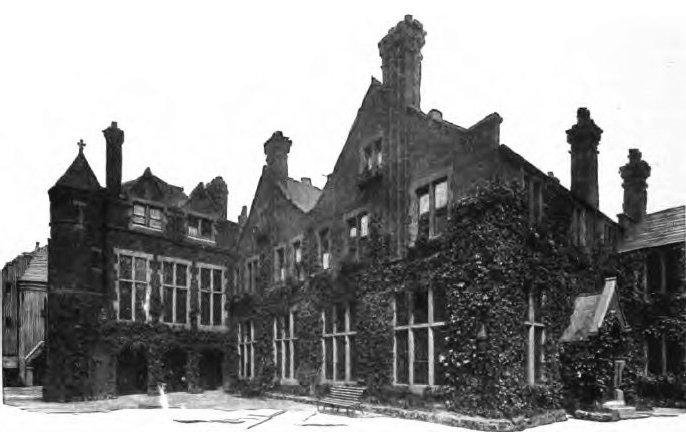
Toynbee Hall settlement house, founded 1884, pictured here in 1902

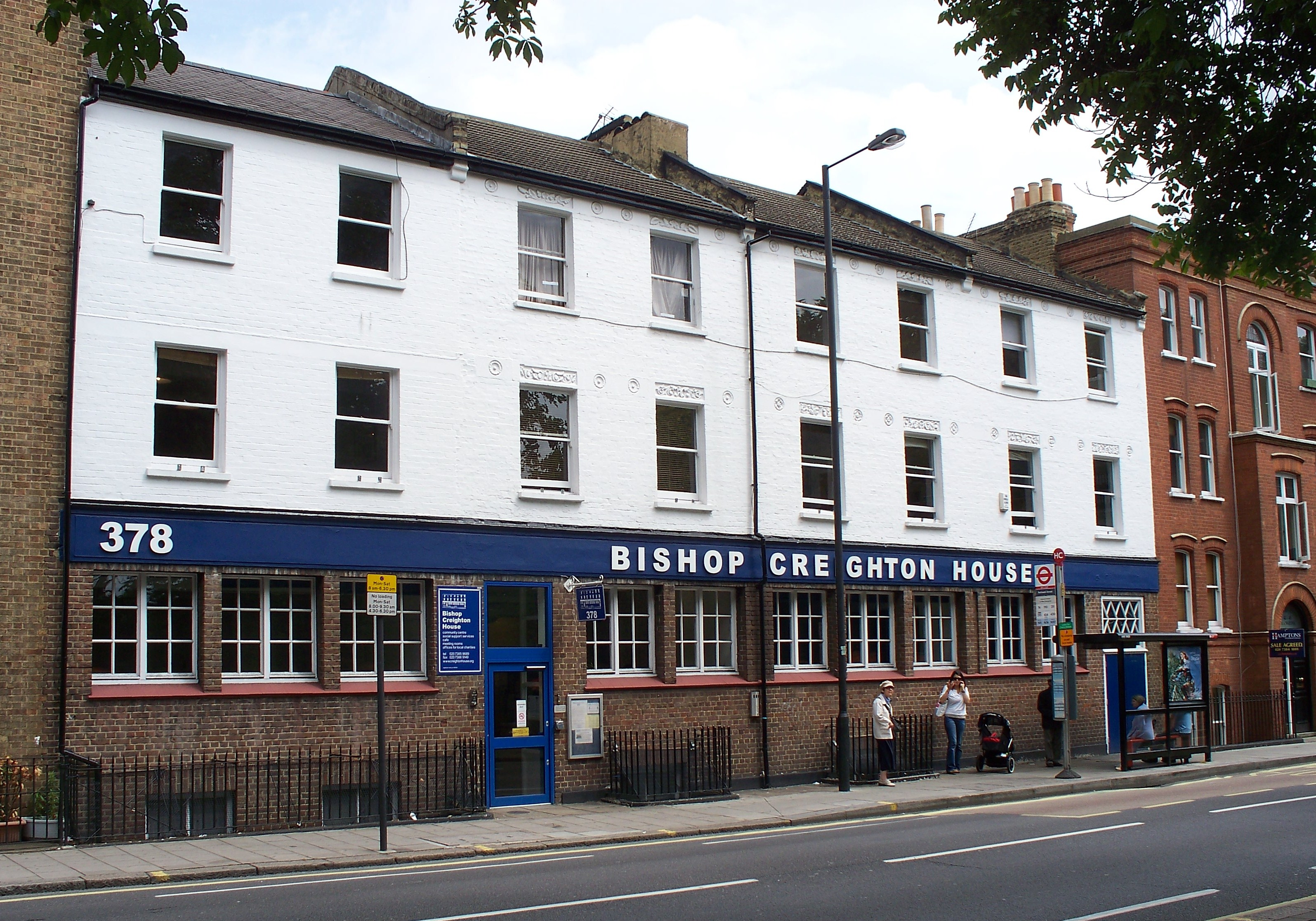
Bishop Creighton House, founded 1907 in Fulham in memory of the late Bishop of London

The movement started in 1884 with the founding of Toynbee Hall in Whitechapel, in the East End of London. These houses, radically different from those later examples in America, often offered food, shelter, and basic and higher education, provided by virtue of charity on part of wealthy donors, the residents of the city, and (for education) scholars who volunteered their time.

Victorian Britain, increasingly concerned with poverty, gave rise to the movement whereby those connected to universities settled students in slum areas to live and work alongside local people. Through their efforts settlement houses were established for education, savings, sports, and arts. Such institutions were often praised by religious representatives concerned with the lives of the poor, and criticised as normative or moralistic by radical social movements.

There were basic commonalities in the movement. These institutions were more concerned with societal causes for poverty, especially the changes that came with industrialisation, rather than personal causes which their predecessors believed were the main reason for poverty. The settlement movement believed that social reform was best pursued and pushed for by private charities. The movement was oriented toward a more collectivist approach and was seen as a response to socialist challenges that confronted the British political economy and philanthropy.

The British Association of Settlements and Social Action Centres is a network of such organisations. Other early examples include Browning Hall, formed in Walworth in 1895 by Francis Herbert Stead, and Mansfield House Settlement, also in east London (see Percy Alden). Oxford House in Bethnal Green was sponsored by High Church Anglicans associated with Oxford University. West London saw its first settlement not until 1907. Dogged by overcrowding, unsanitary conditions and rank poverty, the new arrivals attracted by work in Edwardian Fulham elicited the concern of the late Victorian Bishop of London, Mandell Creighton and his wife, Louise, lodged in Fulham Palace. After his early death, his widow founded Bishop Creighton House Settlement in Lillie Road, Fulham, in his memory. In Edinburgh, the New College Settlement was founded in 1893, followed by the Edinburgh University Settlement in 1905. Bristol University Settlement was founded by Marian Pease and Hilda Cashmore in 1911.

There is also a global network, The International Federation of Settlements and Neighborhood Centers (IFS).

The movement gave rise to many social policy initiatives and innovative ways of working to improve the conditions of the most excluded members of society. The Poor Man's Lawyer service came about because a barrister volunteered his time and encouraged his friends to do the same. In general, the settlement movement, and settlement houses in particular, "have been a foundation for social work practice in this country".

As higher education opened up to women, young female graduates came into the settlement movement. The Women's University Settlement (now Blackfriars Settlement) was founded in 1887 "by women from Girton and Newnham Colleges at Cambridge University, Lady Margaret, and Somerville Colleges at Oxford University and Bedford and Royal Holloway Universities".

=== Australia ===
Australia's first settlement activity was begun by the University of Sydney Women's Society. The Society was instigated by Helen Phillips when she was the first tutor of women students at the University of Sydney in 1891–1892. Before she took up that position, Phillips visited Cambridge and Oxford Universities in England to find out how they supported women students. She also visited her younger brother, William Inchbold Phillips, Priest in Charge, St John's College Mission (Lady Margaret Church) Walworth where she learned more about the work of the college mission. The mission involved university students in charitable works and educating poorer people in the area in the settlement movement tradition. She took the model back to Australia and formed the Women's Society which focused on visiting patients in hospitals and setting up night schools particularly a night school for girls at Millers Point, Sydney. After Phillips left the university for missionary and education work in Ceylon (now Sri Lanka) the founding principal of the new Women's College, Louisa Macdonald developed settlement work further through the Women's Association. Over the years The Settlement gained the support of other partners and provided services for Aboriginal and migrant families and is now known as The Settlement Neighbourhood Centre in Darlington, Sydney New South Wales.

=== United States ===
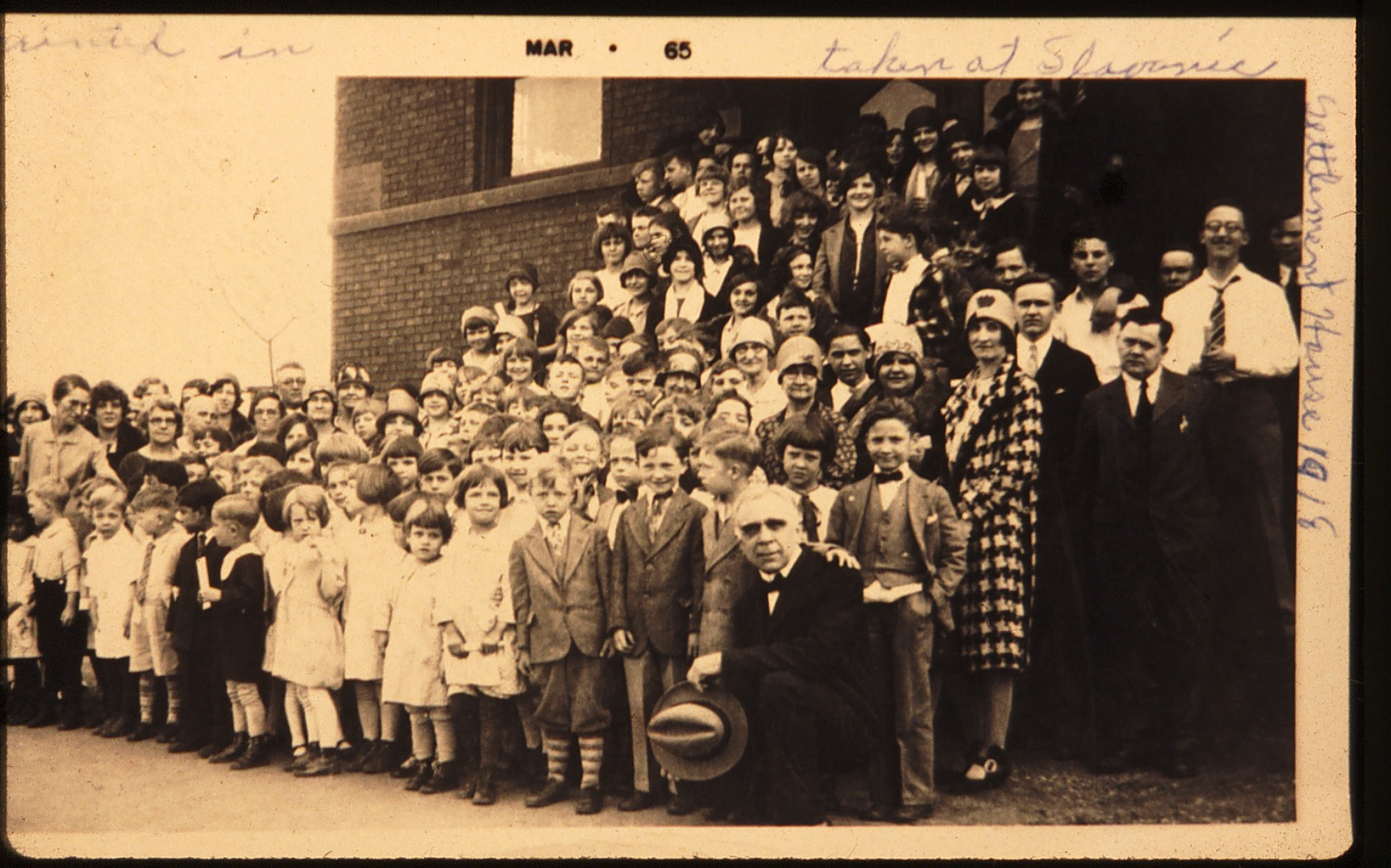
Bohemian immigrant youth at the Lessie Bates Davis Neighborhood House in 1918 in East St. Louis, Illinois

The settlement movement model was introduced in the United States by Jane Addams after travelling to Europe and learning about the system in England. It was Addams who became the leading figure of the settlement movement in the United States with the help of like-minded personalities such as Mary Rozet Smith, Mary Keyser, Alice Hamilton, Julia Lathrop, Florence Kelley, and Ella May Dunning Smith, among others.

The settlement movement became popular due to the socio-economic situation in the United States between 1890 and 1910, when more than 12 million European people immigrated to the country. They came from Ireland, Russia, Italy and other European countries and provided cheap factory labor, a demand that was necessitated by the country's expansion into the west and rapid industrialization following the Civil War. Many immigrants lived in crowded and disease-ridden tenements, worked long hours, and lived in poverty. Children often worked to help support the family. The movement's goal was to help first generation American-born children from the tenements make the transition from the cultures of their immigrant parents to that of the new country and to generally bring the rich and the poor of society together in both physical proximity and social connection. Jacob Riis wrote How the Other Half Lives in 1890 about the lives of immigrants on New York City's Lower East Side to bring greater awareness of the immigrant's living conditions.

The most famous settlement house in the United States is Chicago's Hull House, founded by Addams and Ellen Gates Starr in 1889 after Addams visited Toynbee Hall within the previous two years. Hull House, unlike the charity and welfare efforts which preceded it, was not a religious-based organization. Instead of Christian ethic, Addams opted to ground her settlement on democratic ideals. It focused on providing education and recreational facilities for European immigrant women and children.

Katharine Coman, Vida Scudder, and Katharine Lee Bates were among a group of women who founded Denison House in Boston in 1892. Union Settlement Association, founded in 1894, Whittier House, founded in 1894, Lenox Hill Neighborhood House, founded in 1894, Friendly Inn Settlement House, founded in 1894, Henry Street Settlement, founded in 1893, Hiram House, founded in 1896, Houchen House in El Paso Texas, founded in 1912 and University Settlement House, founded in 1886 and the oldest in the United States, were, like Hull House, important institutions for social reform in America's teeming, immigrant-dominant urban communities. United Neighborhood Houses of New York is the federation of 38 settlement houses in New York City. These and other settlement houses inspired the establishment of settlement schools to serve isolated rural communities in Appalachia, such as the Hindman Settlement School in 1902 and the Pine Mountain Settlement School in 1913.

A count of American settlements reported: 74 in 1897; 103 in 1900; 204 in 1905; and 413 by 1911 in 32 states. By the 1920s, the number of settlement houses in the country peaked at almost 500. The settlement house concept was continued by Dorothy Day's Catholic Worker "hospitality houses" in the 1930s. By 1993 the estimated number of houses dropped to 300 in 80 cities. In 2012, Boulevard House was established in Southwest Detroit, Michigan.

The American settlement movement sprang out of the then-fashionable philosophy of "scientific philanthropy", a model of social reform that touted the transmission of "proper" (i.e. WASP) values, behavior, and morals to the working classes through charitable but also rigorously didactic programs as a cure to the cycle of poverty. Many settlement workers joined the movement out of a strong conviction that effective social welfare programs were the only thing that could prevent the pernicious development in the United States of a European-style entrenched social class system.

=== Russia ===
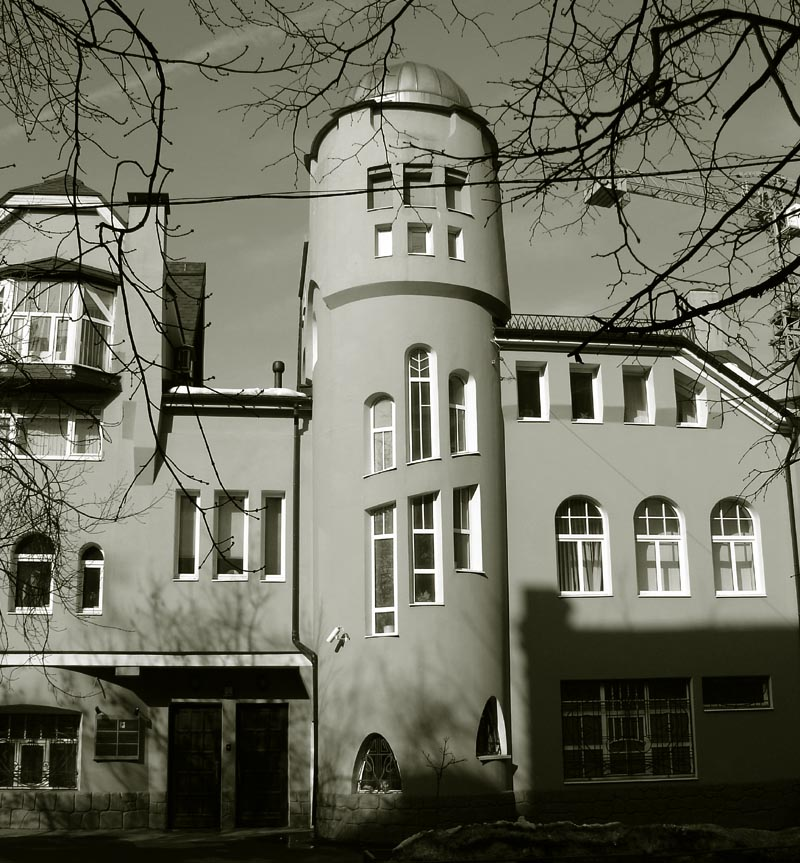
Site of the Communal Club for Working Children, a cornerstone of the Russian Settlement network.

The movement also spread to late imperial Russia, as Stanislav Shatsky and Alexander Zelenko set up a network of educational and social institutions in northern Moscow in 1905, naming it "Settlement" ("Сетлемент", the English word transliterated to Russian). This network of institutions was closed down by the government in 1908, due to alleged socialist activities.

== Description ==
Today, settlements are still community-focused organizations, providing a range of services including early education, youth guidance and crime intervention, senior programs, and specialized programs for young people who have "aged out" of the foster care system. Since they are staffed by professional employees and students, they no longer require that employees live alongside those they serve.

== Legacy and impact ==
Settlement houses influenced urban design and architecture in the twentieth century. For example, James Rossant of Conklin + Rossant agreed with Robert E. Simon's social vision and consciously sought to mix economic backgrounds when drawing up the master plan for Reston, Virginia. The New Monastic movement has a similar goal and model.

The settlement house, in fact, was the first effective effort, not merely to overcome the barbarism of the submerged areas of the metropolis, but to establish in its random neighborhoods an appropriate social nucleus which could serve as a meeting-point for its social and educational activities ... The colonization of the slums by means of the Settlement House was an important event: not merely did it give the slum dweller himself his first glimpse of art, literature, drama, music, play : not merely did it provide a place for clubs and social groups to meet. Something else happened. The success of the Settlement House called attention to the fact that more prosperous neighborhoods were in fact equally devoid of the elementary organs of association: civically speaking, every middle-class neighborhood was a nonentity, too. It was, then, precisely out of the most degrading poverty and the most disorganized environment that the new conception of an organized urban neighborhood, with a central building adapted to a varied round of communal activities, took shape. This conception is fundamental to the best housing and community building that have been done during the past generation : it will probably remain, even though the name disappear and the institution be modified, the most fundamental cultural contribution of the metropolis to the new order.

— Lewis Mumford, The Culture of Cities (Brace, Harcourt and Company, 1938), p.298

== See also ==
- Down to the Countryside Movement
- Gentrification
- List of active settlement houses
- List of historical settlement houses
- Social work
- Sonoratown, Los Angeles, for description of one of the houses
