= Lessie Bates Davis Neighborhood House =

Coordinates: 38°37′57″N 90°8′8″W

Logo

Lessie Bates Davis Neighborhood house is a 103-year-old comprehensive social services organization based in East St. Louis, Illinois. It is a United Way organization and is a United Methodist settlement house operating 22 programs at five sites in the Metro East St. Louis Metro East.

The neighborhood house is part of the United Methodist General Board of Global Ministries, meaning it is part of the United Methodist Church's global mission.

== Mission of the Lessie Bates Davis Neighborhood House's programs ==
The LBDNH programs address basic human needs by providing food; clothing and emergency help with medical, utility and rent expenses and school supplies.

The programs of the Lessie Bates Davis Neighborhood House provide training and support for new and young parents with high risk predictors for abuse and neglect, operate quality pre-school programs and runs after-school enrichment programs for teens.

It helps troubled youth, ages 11 to 17, by working with individual families using the case management approach. It assists individuals with job searches, access to job training and employment coaching.

Its homemakers program provides the elderly with in-home household care, transportation to help them remain in their homes, a day care program offering healthy activities for seniors with disabilities and respite for caregivers.

In each program dealing with client, LBDNH uses the wraparound approach. Provide multiple services to individuals and their families to ensure quality of life improving outcomes.

Finally, the LBDNH works with other regional agencies to apply for grants, use funds effectively and efficiently and address needs region-wide to foster cooperation among organizations.

== History of the Lessie Bates Davis Neighborhood House ==
The original mission of the neighborhood house was serving Bohemian immigrants who came to East St. Louis in the early 1900s to work in National Stockyards.

Through the support of the Women's Home Missionary Society, Rev. W.F. Fransee, of Bohemian descent, came to the area as a missionary to these people. A small cottage near the comer of 9th and Winstanley was obtained and thus began the Slavonic Settlement, as it was first known.

Church services and Sunday School were held regularly, but from the beginning, the work sought to meet the social, physical and spiritual needs of the community. A Day Care for children of working mothers was one of the first programs to be started. The programs met a ready response and the mission work grew rapidly. In response to the rapidly growing programs, the Women's Home Missionary Society of Southern Illinois Conference in 1914 provided the funds for a new building at the comer of 9th and Winstanley.

In 1939, the a new building was constructed and names the after Mrs. Frank L. Davis (Lessie Bates, the wife of a physician, who raised the $125,000 necessary for the construction.

Elizabeth Provence served as executive director during the tumult of the 1960s and early 1970s, strengthening and expanding the agency's recreational and educational programs at the agency. In addition, she was able to get the community residents more actively involved in the programming at Neighborhood House. As the city's population fell from 75,000 in the 1960s to slightly over 40,000 by 1990, the housing stock continued to decline and the number of impoverished people in the city increased. The needs of the children and families in the community also continued to grow and change. In response to this growing need the Neighborhood House began offering additional programs and services, with the goal of "Empowering and Strengthening the Individuals and Families throughout the greater East St. Louis community."

== Locations ==
Lessie Bates Davis Neighborhood operates five sites in the Greater St. Louis Metro East area. St. Louis Metro East

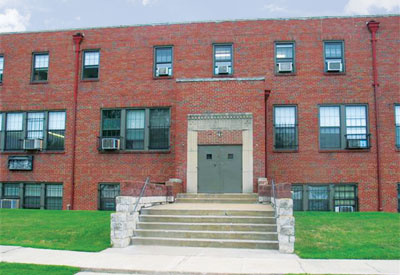
Administrative offices

Lessie Bates Davis Neighborhood House houses the administrative offices of Lessie Bates Davis organization.

The building was dedicated in 1939 and named after Lessie Bates Davis, who raised the funds for the building. The original building held dorms for missionaries. Year round the site hosts an open and supervised gymnasium for area youth. Programs today include emergency services programs, utility assistance, outreach programs, youth services including recreation, education, jobs program and cultural arts, and a wide range of comprehensive family support and family preservation services. Services to adults entering/re-entering the job market includes; computer and internet access, job readiness training, and access to social service experts. The food pantry is housed in LBDNH's 1200 N. 13th Street location, serving four Illinois county areas: St. Clair County, Madison County, Monroe County and Clinton County. An extension of The PASS Program (Providing a Sure Start) is also house in this building. This program provides early childhood prevention services for parents with children from birth to three (3) years old.

The Lessie Bates Davis Family Development Center is the site of LBDNH's day care, Pre-K, Head Start and The PASS Program (Providing a Sure Start). This program provides early childhood prevention services for parents with children from birth to three (3) years old. . The site was formerly a grocery store in downtown East St. Louis that was converted into class rooms in 1989.

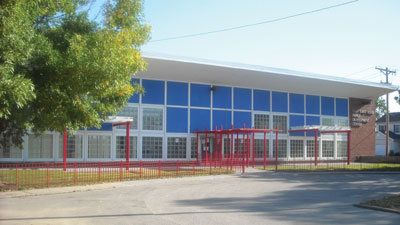
Family Development Center

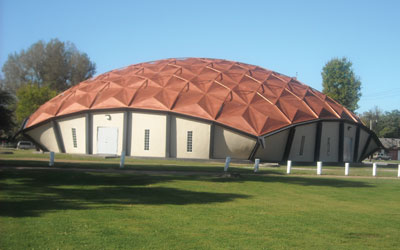
Mary E. Brown Center

The Mary E. Brown Center is the primary youth center for Lessie Bates Davis youth programs. It houses after school and summer time school hours recreation, classes, tutoring, and arts. It is on site of the Teen-REACH programs which mentor youth and provide positive and educational activities. The building is unique in itself, with the gymnasium housed under a geodesic dome designed by Buckminster Fuller.

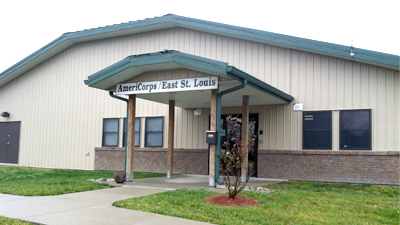
Continuum of Life Care Center/Paulyn House

Continuum of Life Care Center/Paulyn House is located at 1274 N. 37th St, East Saint Louis, IL 62204. It houses a Senior Services Program, Meals on Wheels and intermittently serve as a homeless resources center during time of extreme weather conditions. Resources include counselors, meals, cool shelter in times of heat, showers, computer and internet access, job readiness training, and access to social service experts.

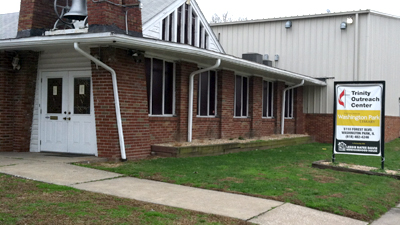
Trinity Outreach Center

Trinity Outreach Center is the location of LBDNH's Teen TeenREACH (Responsibility, Education, Achievement, Caring, and Hope), which provides youth activities during non-school hours and throughout the school year as well as during the summer through the use of six core components:

1. Improving Academic Performance
2. Recreation, Sports, and Cultural & Artistic Activities
3. Positive Adult Mentors
4. Life Skills Education
5. Parental Involvement
6. Service Learning

The building houses a gymnasium, computer lab, activity areas, as well as administration space for youth supervisors case workers.
