= Lenox Hill Neighborhood House =

Coordinates: 40.76695°N 73.95788°W

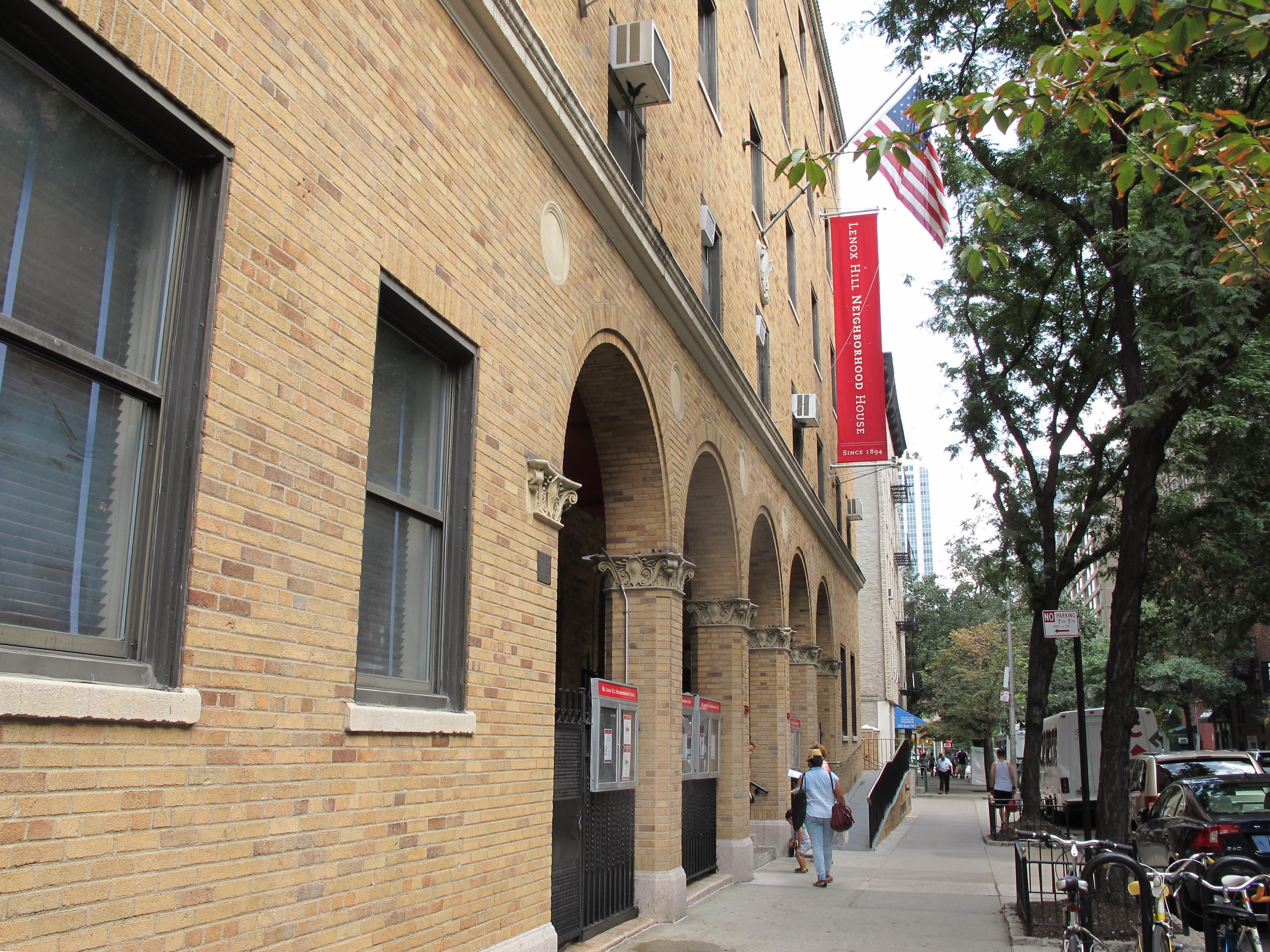
A view of the headquarters of Lenox Hill Neighborhood House, on 70th Street in Manhattan

Lenox Hill Neighborhood House (the “Neighborhood House”) is a multi-service, community-based organization that serves people in need on the East Side of Manhattan and on Roosevelt Island. Founded in 1894 as a free kindergarten for the children of indigent immigrants and as one of the first settlement houses in the nation, Lenox Hill Neighborhood House is the oldest and largest provider of social, educational and supportive services on Manhattan's Upper East Side. Each year, they assist thousands of individuals and families who range in age from 3 to 103, represent dozens of races, ethnicities and countries of origin and "live, work, go to school or access services" on the East Side from 14th Street to 143rd Street and on Roosevelt Island. Their clients include indigent families and the working poor who live in the East Side's housing projects and tenements or who travel to the Upper East Side to work in low-wage jobs such as cashiers, housekeepers, nannies and laborers; 10,000 seniors; and hundreds of mentally ill homeless and formerly homeless adults. They have five locations between 54th and 102nd Streets, offer programs at dozens of East Side locations; their headquarters is located on East 70th Street.

The Neighborhood House has served the community for 132 years and has multiple departments (Older Adult Services, Children and Family Services, Homelessness and Housing, Food Services, Health and Wellness, Adult Education, Visual and Performing Arts and more), more than 20 different programs, nearly 200 staff and over 1,100 regular volunteers. Their mission is to help those in need who live, work, or go to school on Manhattan's East Side and to improve the quality of life for all individuals and families in their community. They define need broadly to include economic, social, emotional, and physical need, but give priority to those in economic need.

== Foundation ==
The Neighborhood House was founded in 1894 as a free kindergarten for the children of immigrants living and working on the Upper East Side of Manhattan. As the community has grown and diversified over the last 130 years, so has the Neighborhood House. It has long been a center of community activism and leadership, addressing such issues as affordable housing, poor working conditions, health care, hunger, childcare, poverty, unemployment, homelessness, juvenile delinquency, crime prevention, and long-term care for older adults. In addition to creating New York City's first tenants' rights group, the Neighborhood House helped organize New York City's first "Meals on Wheels" program, first government-funded social adult day care program, and helped create a continuum of care for homeless people in New York City. The Neighborhood House was profiled as “Agency of the Month” by the New York Nonprofit Press.

== Programs ==
=== Adult education ===
The Neighborhood House offers classes in English for Speakers of Other Languages (ESOL) and offers technology support to low-tech older adult clients and neighbors.

=== Children and family services ===
The Early Childhood Center is a year-round program that ensures that children can attend the Neighborhood House from 9 a.m. to 4 p.m., five days a week, 12 months a year. Their rich curriculum includes computers, field trips, art and music activities, outdoor play and swimming. In 2024, the Early Childhood Center was re-accredited by the National Association for the Education of Young Children.

=== Food services ===
Their Food Services staff prepare and serve more than 400,000 meals a year to older adults, children and homeless and formerly homeless adults.

=== Homelessness and Housing ===
Through the Homelessness and Housing Department, the Neighborhood House provides a comprehensive network of programs and services to homeless and formerly homeless men and women each year to help them gain independence and stability.

The Department provides support to more than 500 homeless men and women each year who are homeless, formerly homeless, or threatened with eviction and life on the streets. The Department's programs include: an 80-bed women's mental health shelter serving women age 45 and over who are mentally ill; a supportive housing residence with apartments for 54 formerly homeless adults who are mentally ill; and the Homelessness Prevention Program, which helps individuals to avoid homelessness through a variety of interventions well-suited for their multidisciplinary settlement house model.

=== Older adult services ===
The Neighborhood House's Older Adult Services Department serves more than 10,000 seniors throughout Manhattan each year. The majority of these older adults are low-income individuals on fixed incomes.

=== The Teaching Kitchen® at Lenox Hill Neighborhood House ===
The Teaching Kitchen is a training and technical assistance program to help nonprofit organizations to convert their food services to a farm-to-institution model by serving more fresh, healthy and local food—without raising costs. The Teaching Kitchen has trained more than 300 nonprofit staff from 300 programs serving 35 million meals annually and is free of charge to most nonprofit community-based organizations.

=== Visual and performing arts ===
The Visual and Performing Arts Department integrates arts instruction including visual art, creative movement, music and drama and performance into most of the Neighborhood House's programs.

=== Volunteer program ===
Lenox Hill Neighborhood House has more than 1,100 active volunteers who provide support to their programs and operations.

== Notable people ==
- James Cagney (1899–1986), attended after school programs as a child
- Alice P. Gannett (1875–1962), head resident, Lenox Hill settlement house, 1907-12
- Albert Hadley (1920–2012), former board member and longtime gala design chair
- Lucile Hoerr Charles (1903–1965), directed drama programs at Lenox Hill in 1930s
- Jacqueline Kennedy Onassis (1929 – 1994), former benefactor
- Ruth Lercher Bornstein, taught art classes at Lenox Hill in 1940s
