= Hiram House =

Coordinates: 41°27′1″N 81°26′52″W

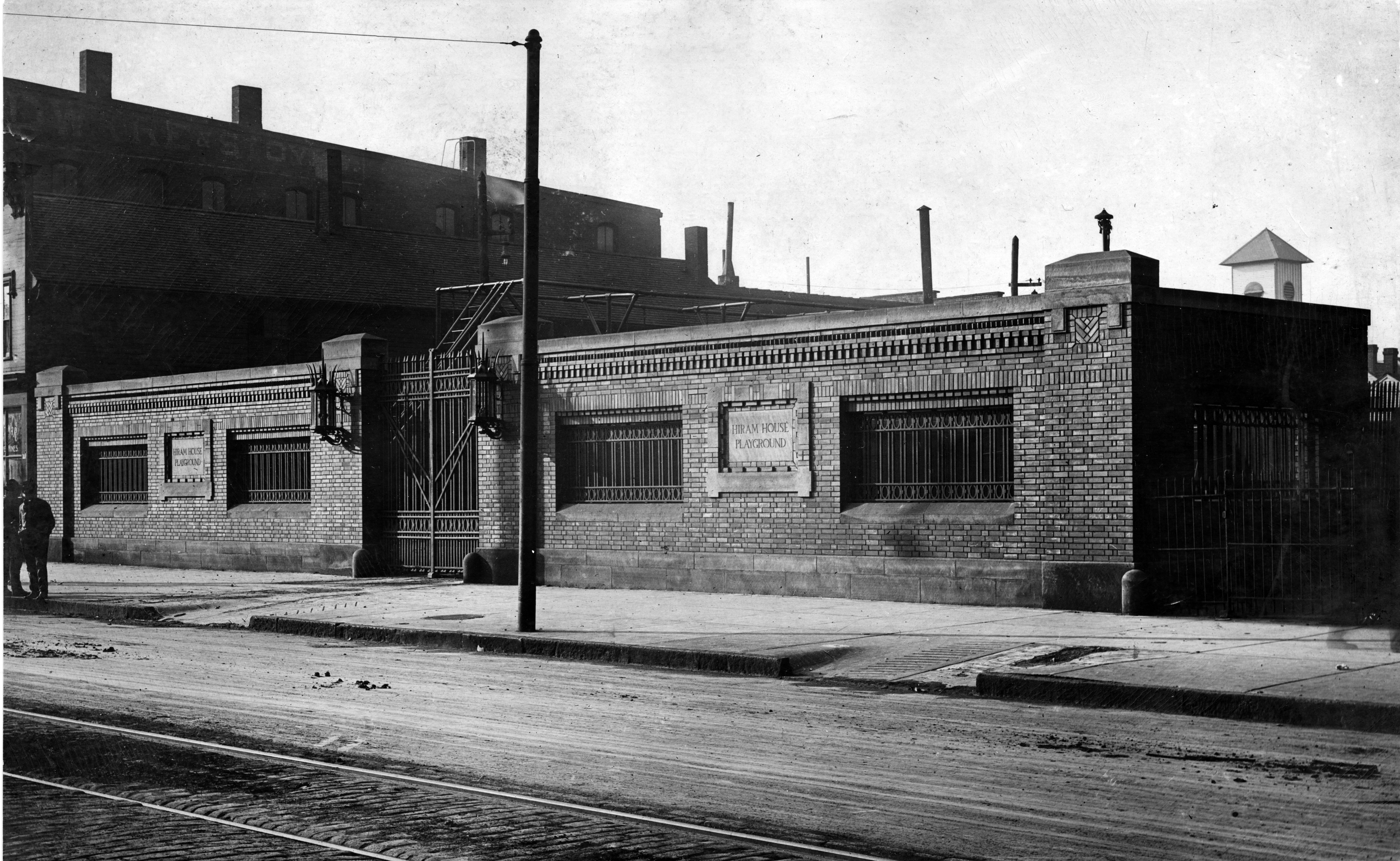
Hiram House (1915)

The Hiram House was the first settlement house in Cleveland, and one of the first in the United States. It was founded in 1896 by George A. Bellamy and students from Hiram College.

== History ==
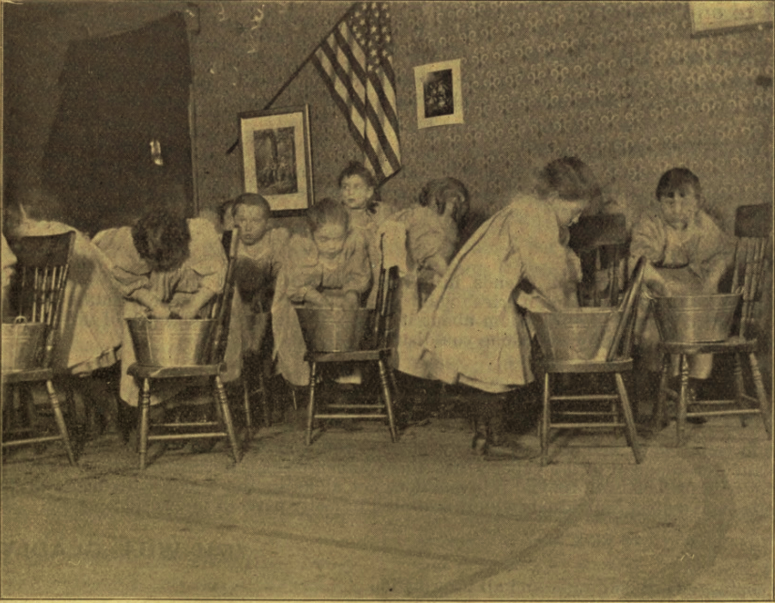
Wash day in the Hiram House kindergarten (1898)

Hiram House was founded by students from Hiram College who had been studying settlement work. In June 1896, the students rented a house near the Whiskey Island area of Cleveland, which was predominantly populated by Irish immigrants at that time. George Bellamy joined the group, which shortly thereafter moved the settlement house to a site on Orange Avenue, in what was then the city's main Jewish neighborhood. Hiram House was incorporated in 1899, and within a year had raised enough funds to construct a new four-story building, which served until 1941. Financial support came from the Mather, Prentiss, and Hunt families.

Hiram House initially offered English classes for immigrants to assist in passing the exams for citizenship. With the new building came college preparatory courses, a kindergarten, a summer camp, various clubs and space to host other recreational activities. Among the teachers at Hiram House in 1900 was Louise Brigham, who later became known for designing furniture out of packing crates.

The Hiram House Camp, located on a 172-acre (0.70 km^{2}) site in the nearby Chagrin River Valley village of Moreland Hills, was donated in 1902. The organization has operated a summer camp continuously since 1897.

George A. Bellamy, a Hiram College divinity graduate, formally took control of the house in 1897 and developed it into the largest and most financially secure settlement in Cleveland.

In 1926, Hiram House partnered with Cleveland Public Schools to establish branch efforts inside school buildings, expanding its educational reach. The demographics of the surrounding neighborhood shifted over time from East European Jewish immigrants in 1900, to Italian Americans by 1914, and later to African Americans following World War I.

The Orange Avenue location ceased operation in 1941, and the building was demolished shortly after. Branch programming officially ended in 1948 based on recommendations by the Welfare Federation. Since then, Hiram House has functioned primarily as a year-round camping and recreational facility, serving children and families throughout Greater Cleveland.

== Social impact ==
Hiram House significantly influenced the social reform landscape of early 20th-century Cleveland by pioneering settlement work that emphasized community integration and intercultural engagement. As one of the first American settlement houses outside a major coastal city, it served as a model for regional efforts to support immigrants, low-income families, and urban youth. By offering inclusive programs regardless of race, ethnicity, or religion, it challenged prevailing segregationist norms and fostered cross-cultural understanding at a time of rapid demographic change in the city.

The organization's early adoption of immersive, community-based programming including neighborhood clubs, vocational guidance, and health education contributed to the broader Progressive Era movement advocating for social equity through grassroots involvement. Hiram House was also part of the national network of settlement houses affiliated with the National Federation of Settlements and Neighborhood Centers, sharing practices and influencing policies on urban poverty, child welfare, and immigrant assimilation.

In addition to serving immediate needs, Hiram House played a generational role in youth development through its camp in Moreland Hills. Thousands of children from underserved neighborhoods attended summer programs emphasizing leadership, nature education, and cooperative play principles that predicted later trends in experiential education.

Today, Hiram House's continued operation as a nonprofit camp represents one of the longest-standing legacies of the American settlement movement, preserving its core mission of building inclusive, service-oriented communities.
