= Jane Elizabeth Robbins =

American physician and social worker (1860–1946)

Jane E. Robbins
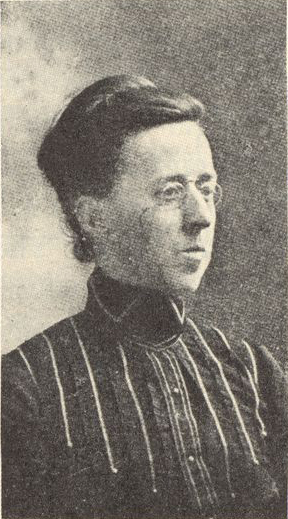
- Robbins in 1902
- Born: December 28, 1860; Wethersfield, Connecticut, U.S.
- Died: August 16, 1946 (aged 85); Hartford, Connecticut, U.S.
- Education: Smith College
- Occupations: Physician, settlement house leader
- Employer(s): Rivington Street Settlement; New York Infirmary

Jane Elizabeth Robbins (1860–1946) was an American physician and social worker. She was a pioneer in the settlement house movement, founding the Rivington Street Settlement with Jean Gurney Fine in 1889. Robbins advocated for civic reform and on behalf of residents of tenement housing and immigrant families. She graduated from Smith College and taught obstetrics at the Women's Medical College of the New York Infirmary. She headed settlement houses in New York's Lower East Side, Cleveland, and Baltimore. She worked with the Red Cross and served as a nurse in the Spanish–American War and World War I, later working in Italy and Greece.

== Early life and education ==
Jane Elizabeth Robbins was born on December 28, 1860, in Wethersfield, Connecticut, to Harriet (née Welles) and Richard Austin Robbins. Robbins graduated from Smith College in 1883 before moving to New York City to study medicine.

== Career ==
Robbins was a pioneer in the settlement house movement in the U.S. She advocated for tenements, civic reform, labor issues, education, and public parks.

In 1888 and 1889, Robbins lived across the street from the Neighborhood Guild (later the University Settlement Society of New York) with Jean Gurney Fine. They established Girl's Clubs, providing activities for girls. By September 1889, they had established College Settlement (later known as the Rivington Street Settlement) in a brick building at 95 Rivington Street, just north of the Neighborhood Guild. Robbins served as the settlement's physician-in-residence. Fine served as director of College Settlement until 1892, when Robbins succeeded her, staying in the role of director for five years.

Robbins started her own medical practice in Little Italy around 1891. By 1893, she was an instructor in obstetrics at the Women's Medical College of the New York Infirmary for Indigent Women and Children. During the 1894 tailors' strike in New York, Robbins served as a representative of the tailors' interests alongside Josephine Shaw Lowell. She was a nurse during the Spanish–American War in 1898.

In 1901 Robbins headed New York's Normal College Alumnae House. She worked with Jacob Riis to secure a law requiring New York schools to have outdoor playgrounds. In 1902, she moved to Ohio to engage in settlement work with the Italian American community. She worked at the Alta House in Cleveland. From December 1904 to April 1905 she was the head of the Locust Point Social Settlement House in Baltimore, Maryland.

Robbins was part of an influential group of social progressives who argued that public schools should be involved in welfare work. She "wrote that it was necessary for the school to assume a parental role because under modern conditions it was not possible for the poor to protect the young adequately." In 1911, she worked in Brooklyn at the Little Italy Settlement. In 1914, she worked at the Jacob A. Riis Neighborhood Settlement. Robbins wrote articles for newspapers, including The Outlook and Charities magazines. She gave many public lectures. In a 1918 talk about sympathy for immigrants, she spoke out on behalf of anarchist Emma Goldman, whom she said she had known since Goldman had come to the United States.

After World War I, Robbins worked with the Red Cross in Italy and in Greece where she assisted in the organization of temporary hospitals. Following the uprising against Turkey, she returned to Greece in 1927 where she helped refugees until 1929. In the 1930s, she toured the United States as part of the National Federation of Settlements.

Robbins died on August 16, 1946, in Hartford, Connecticut.

== See also ==
- College Settlements Association
