= James Graham Phelps Stokes =

American railroad president (1872–1960)

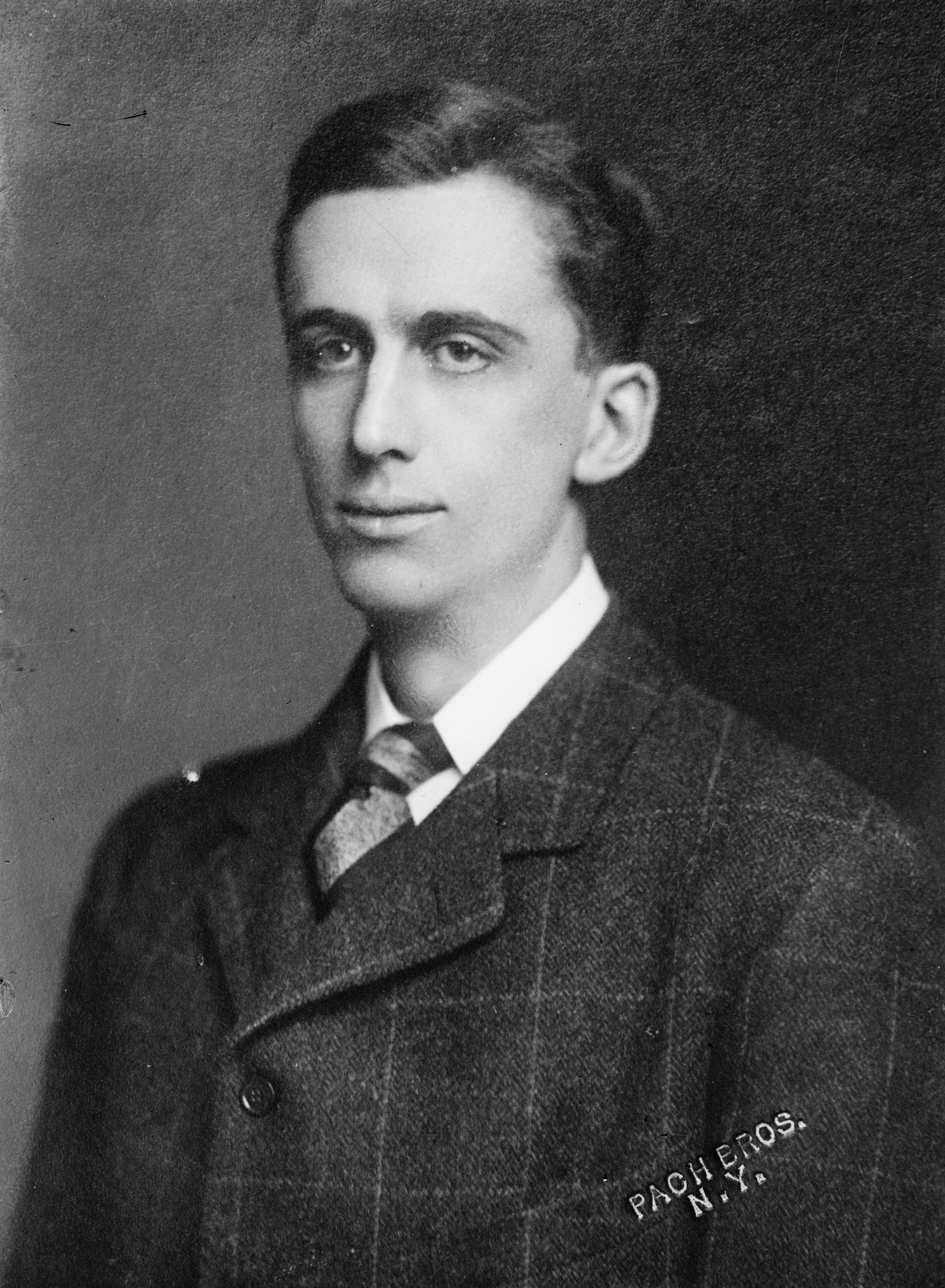
- Portrait by Pach Brothers c. 1900s
- Born: March 18, 1872; New York City, New York, U.S.
- Died: April 8, 1960 (aged 88); New York City, New York, U.S.
- Other name: "Millionaire Socialist"
- Education: Columbia University; Yale University
- Occupation: Railroad president
- Employer: Nevada Central Railroad
- Organization: Intercollegiate Socialist Society
- Political party: Socialist (1906–1917)
- Other political affiliations: Municipal Ownership League (1905)
- Spouse: Rose Pastor Stokes (m. 1905; div. 1925)
- Parent(s): Anson Phelps Stokes; Helen Louise Phelps
- Relatives: Isaac Newton Phelps Stokes (brother); Anson Phelps Stokes (brother); James Boulter Stokes (paternal grandfather); Caroline Phelps Stokes (paternal aunt); Olivia Egleston Phelps Stokes (paternal aunt); William Earle Dodge Stokes (paternal uncle); Edward Stiles Stokes (first cousin once removed)

James Graham Phelps Stokes, known as Graham Stokes (March 18, 1872 – April 8, 1960) was an American socialist, railroad president, political activist, and philanthropist. He was president of the Nevada Central Railroad for forty years.

He is best remembered as a founding member and key figure in the Intercollegiate Socialist Society and as the husband of Rose Pastor Stokes, a radical union organizer, birth control advocate and activist in the Communist Party of America.

== Early years ==
Stokes was born in New York City to one of the city's most prosperous families. His parents were Helen Louisa Phelps and Anson Phelps Stokes, a banker, railroad owner, and real estate developer. He grew up in a large house on 229 Madison Avenue in Manhattan. His family spent the summers in their 100-room house in the Berkshires— the largest private home in the United States at the time. The family fortune came from Manhattan real estate, the Phelps Dodge mining empire, a and railroad in Nevada.

He attended the Sheffield Scientific School of Yale University, receiving his Ph.B. degree there in 1892. There, he was a member of the Fraternity of Delta Psi (St. Anthony Hall). He celebrated his graduation with a trip around the world in 1892.

He also attended the College of Physicians and Surgeons of Columbia University, receiving an M.D. in 1896. While at Columbia University, Stokes became concerned with the plight of the American underclass and poverty. In 1895, Stokes became a member of the Council of the University Settlement and worked for the YMCA. Although his goal was to become a medical missionary, he never practiced medicine because he had to take over the family businesses from his ailing father. Following receipt of his medical degree, Stokes continued with a year of graduate study of political science at Columbia.

Stokes served in Squadron A of New York National Guard from 1896 to 1901. During the Spanish–American War, he was a private in the U.S. Army cavalry, but he did not deploy overseas. At this same time, Graham's father was active in the Anti-Imperialist League, described by one historian as "a group of substantial citizens" opposed to American intervention in the Philippines.

== Career ==
Stokes was president of the Nevada Central Railroad from 1898 to 1938. He was also president of the Nevada Company with offices at 47 Cedar Street and president of the Woodbridge Company at 100 Williams Street. While Stokes did participate in commercial affairs throughout his life, serving variously as an officer of businesses such as the Phelps Stokes Corporation, the Austin Mining Company, and the State Bank of Nevada, Stokes's primary interests and concerns lay in the realm of public affairs.

In 1902, Stocks moved to the Lower East Side to take up settlement work. One of his friends explained, "Mr. Stokes is very much interested in social problems and he takes deep interest in questions concerning capital and labor. He is a thorough democrat in his spirit and feeling, and is opposed to social distinctions which separate the classes... He believes in plain people and feels that every effort which helps them to develop themselves is something to their advantage. He therefore feels that he can serve society best by living in a house which denies the existence of classes and which claims equal opportunities for everybody."

Volunteer workers at the University Settlement received no pay, but did receive modest quarters on the top floor. Historians Arthur Zipser and Pearl Zipser describe the scene: "There was a lively intellectual atmosphere on the top floor of the University Settlement house, where the highly educated, mostly rich, young social workers had their residence, dining, and club rooms. It was a world apart from the lower floors of the building, where the regular settlement house functions were carried out among the denizens of the surrounding ghettoized slum. This separation between leaders and led was not the goal they were aiming for, which was the outreach of the privileged to the downtrodden. But the separation was real."

In addition to being a member of the Council of the University Settlement, Stokes founded and became chair of the board of Hartley House in New York City. He also served on committees of the Church Federation, the People's Institute, the Prison Association of New York, and the Trade School Committee. He was also associated with American Alliance for Labor and Democracy, Constitutional Democracy Association, The Legal Aid Society, National Security League, and the Outdoor Recreation League. In 1905, Stokes was the United States delegate at the International Prison Congress in Budapest, Hungary.

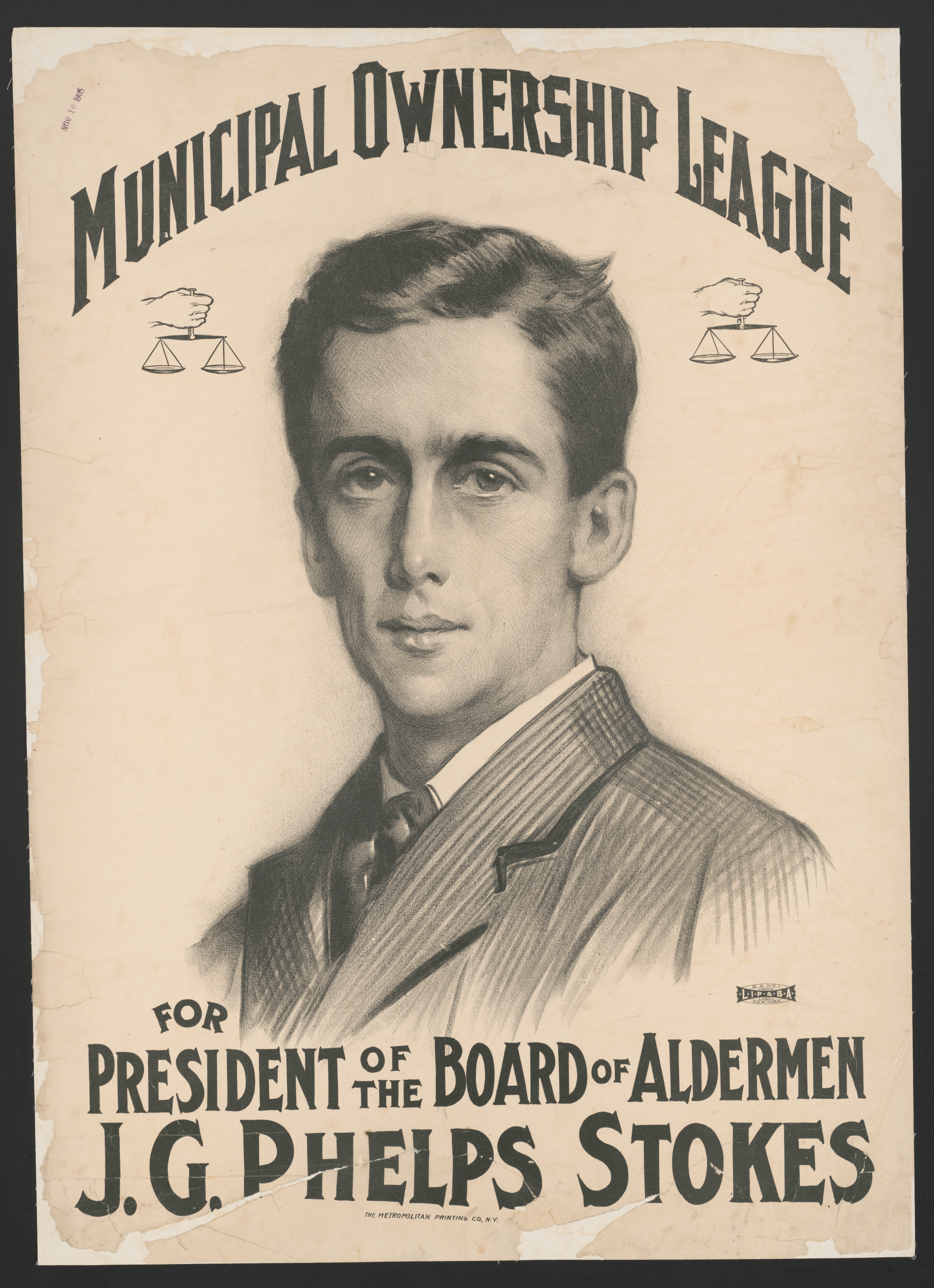
Municipal Ownership League poster advertising Stokes's candidacy for president of the Board of Aldermen, 1905

In 1905, Stokes became a candidate for public office, running for president of the New York Board of Aldermen, representing the Municipal Ownership League. Stokes was the second name on a ticket that featured William Randolph Hearst for Mayor of New York, causing contemporaries to refer to the Municipal Ownership League as "Hearst's League." The decision to run down the ticket with the multimillionaire publisher was not a popular one with Stokes' radical new wife, who wanted defeat for Hearst and his associates. She later recalled:

"One evening, passing my living-room window, I heard Graham's name flung upward from the street below. I leaned out to see. A very fiery young man was making a speech from a soapbox on the corner. A little knot of men, women, and children had collected about him. He was pointing up at my window—at me. He was saying things about us. I strained to hear... 'Municipal Ownership is no solution,' he cried, 'so long as the propertied classes own the municipalities. J.G. Phelps Stokes is a rich man—a man of property; he belongs to the capitalist class. The Municipal Ownership League is a rich man's creation. W.R. Hearst belongs to the millionaire class. This is his government. He doesn't want to change the government. The Socialist Party, the workers' party, and what we want is a government of, for, and by the people who work.' 'Hear, hear!' I called down, leaning far out of the window and clapping my hands.

The campaign did well, but Stokes was disillusioned with the reform movement at the end of the campaign. He joined the Socialist Party of America in 1906. Even before that, Stokes was enlisted in the Socialist cause by the author Upton Sinclair, who sought to establish a new group fostering the dispassionate study of socialist ideas on college campuses around America, an organization to be called the Intercollegiate Socialist Society (ISS). Stokes was one of ten signatories of the published call for the new organization which appeared in the spring of 1905, joining Sinclair, author Jack London, attorney Clarence Darrow, sociologist and author Charlotte Perkins Gilman, and others. The first formal meeting of the organization, held at a restaurant in New York City late in the summer of 1905, elected Stokes as second vice president of the ISS, serving with London as president and Sinclair as first vice president.

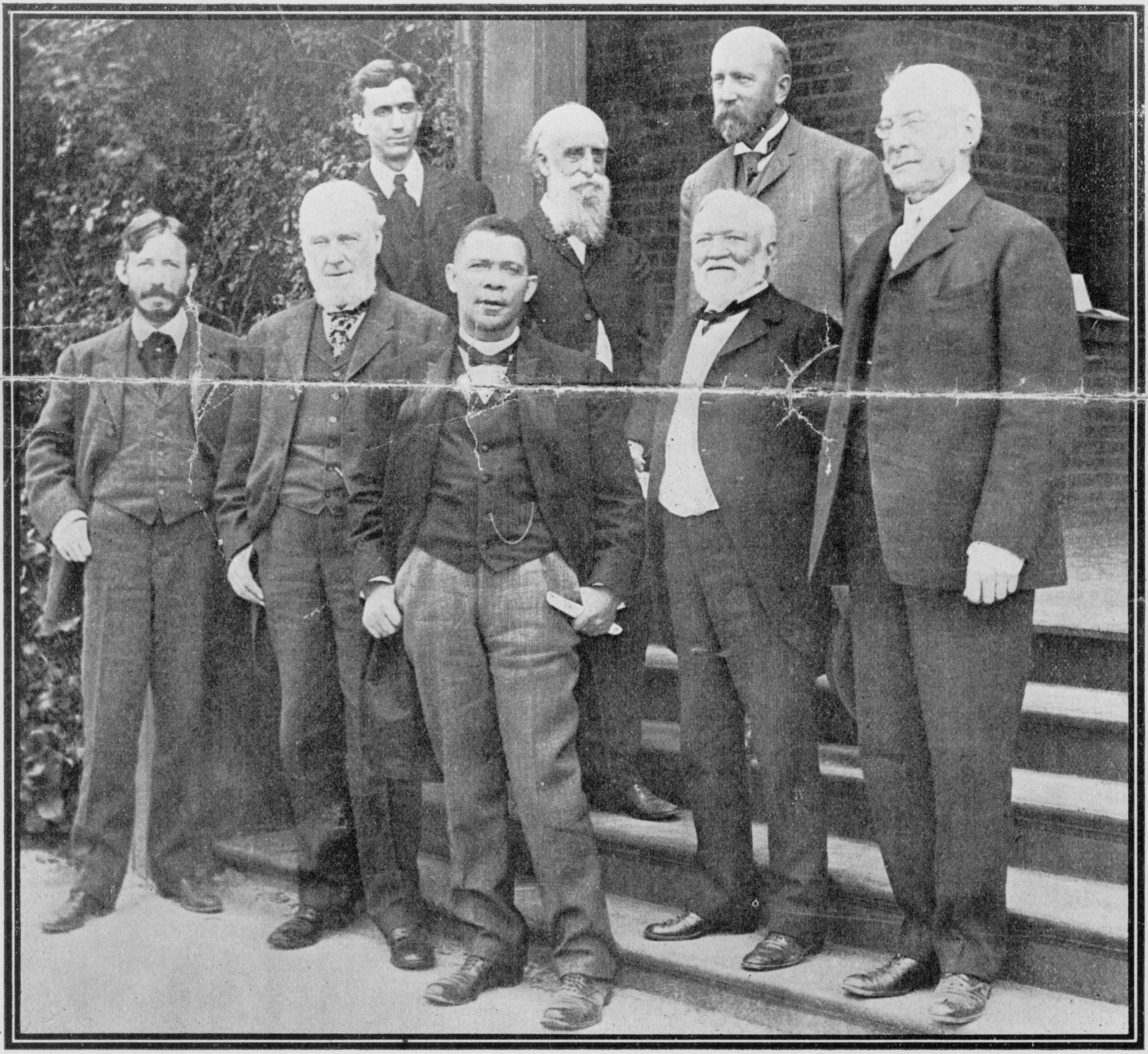
Stokes with Booker T. Washington and others, 1906

In May 1907, London resigned from the ISS presidency and Stokes assumed the position. Stokes had a leading role in the organization for the next decade, serving as president until 1917 and speaking far and wide on topics of contemporary concern under ISS auspices. In the spring of 1909, Stokes and his wife went on the road for a full month, speaking at colleges throughout New England, where they distributed ISS literature for free or at a nominal charge to interested undergraduates.

Stokes ran for New York State Assembly in 1908 as a Socialist candidate. However, he was not an effective speaker and could not engage well with audiences. He also ran for mayor of Stamford, Connecticut. However, Stokes was living a split life—a socialist who was running the family railroad and silver mine.

Stokes resigned from the Socialist Party of America in April 1917 over the question of American participation in World War I, objecting to the party's staunchly antimilitarist stance and its vote against the Selective Service System. He left radical politics after this period and joined several military and patriotic organizations.

Stokes was a frequent author of articles on current social problems and letters of opinion to various journals and newspapers. He also served as a member of the Board of Directors of the Tuskegee Institute.

== Publications ==
=== Books and pamphlets ===
- Hartley House: And Its Relations to the Social Reform Movement. New York: Hartley House, 1897.
- Dear Comrade: The Intercollegiate Socialist Society Has Now Entered Upon its Second Year. with Jack London and Upton Sinclair. New York City: The Society, 1906.
- Down with Democracy! Down with Authority!: Lenine. New York : National Security League, circa 1919.
- Industrial Paralysis under the Bolsheviki: An Examination of Falling Off of Productivity of Manufacturing Centers under 'Dictatorship of Proletariat'. New York: American Alliance for Labor and Democracy, 1919.
- A Brief Sketch of the History of the 244th Coast Artillery (9th Regiment, N.Y.) 16731924. New York: 1924.
- The Gap in the "Lineage of the Ninth Regiment of the State of New York," with Leonhard A. Keyes. New York: 1953.
- The One Lord of East and West. (Introduction by Swami Sivananda) India: Yoga-Vedanta Forest Academy, 1956.
- The Ever-Returning Christ: And Other Writings. Rishikesh, India: Yoga Vedanta Forest University, 1958.

=== Articles ===
- "On the Relation of Settlement Work to the Evils of Poverty," International Journal of Ethics, vol. 11, no. 3, (April 1901) pp. 340–345.
- "Public Schools as Social Centres," The Annals of the American Academy of Political and Social Science, vol. 23 (May 1904), pp. 49–55.

=== As editor ===
- The Socialism of To-day: A Source-Book of the Present Position and Recent Development of the Socialist and Labor Parties in All Countries, Consisting Mainly of Original Documents. Editor, with William English Walling, Jessie Wallace Hughan, and Harry W. Laidler. New York: Henry Holt & Co., 1916

== Honors ==
- He received the Military Cross of the State of New York in 1920.
- Stokes' papers are housed at Columbia University in New York City. The collection includes more than 1600 cataloged letters.
- A collection of letters received by Stokes and his wife are housed at Yale University.
- The Hartley House records, which include extensive correspondence with Graham Phelps Stokes, are housed at the University of Minnesota at Minneapolis.

== Personal life ==
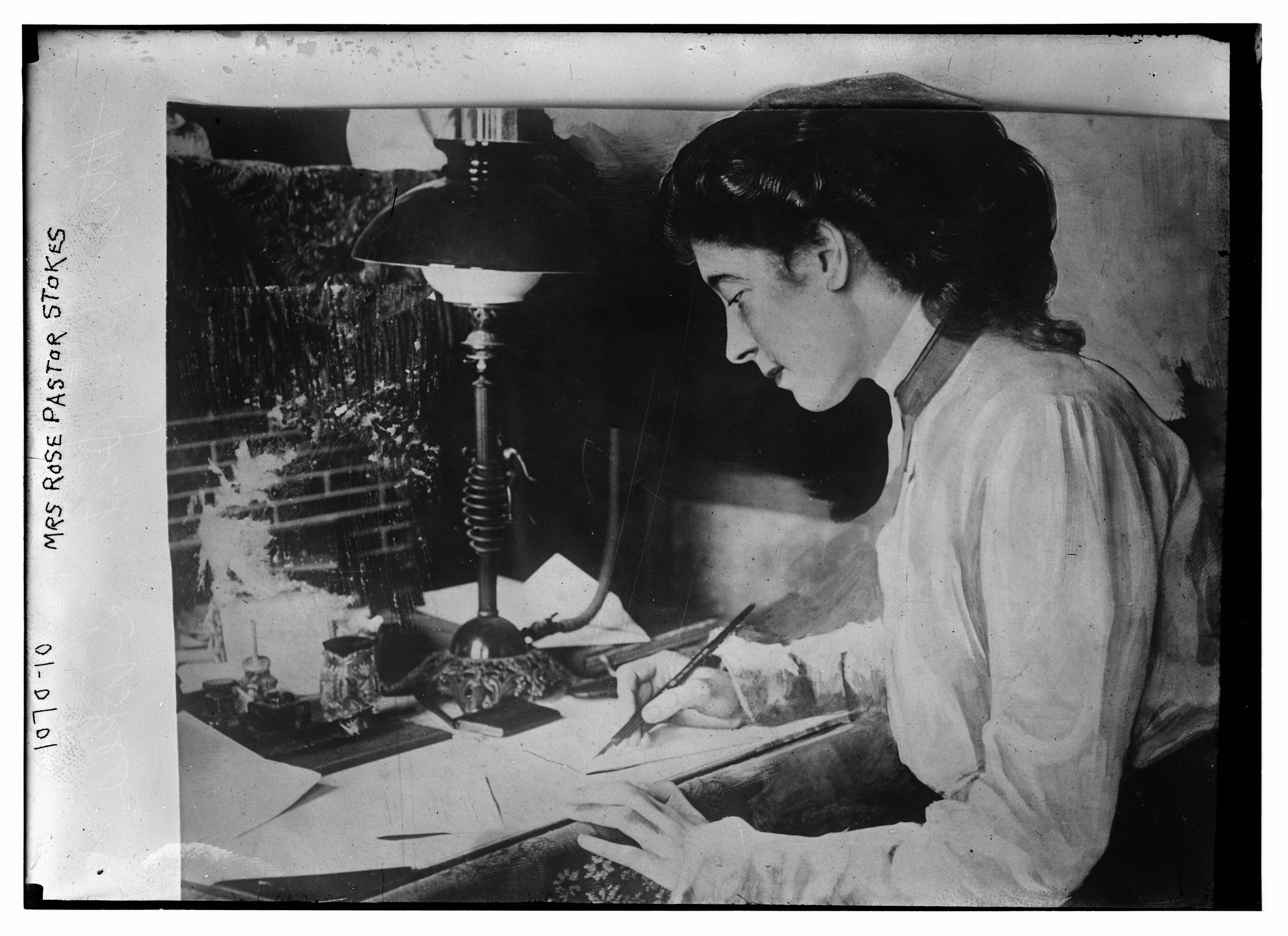
Rose Pastor Stokes

In November 1902, Stokes moved from his father's house to live in the University Settlement house on Eldridge Street the Lower East Side of Manhattan, one of the poorest areas of New York City. Because of the settlement house, Stokes met Rose Harriet Pastor (née Wieslander), a news reporter who interviewed him for the Yiddish Daily News. She was a Jewish–Polish immigrant and former cigar factory employee with less than two years of formal education; the newspapers called her the "Cinderella of the Sweatshops." The couple married on July 18, 1905. With his own hands, Stokes built their home on the two-acre Waite's Island (Caritas Island), New York which he had inherited; the site became populated with reformers and societies of all types.

Their marriage was "the" celebrity wedding of its day, and newspapers reported their every move for nearly two decades. However, they separated when he left radical politics during World War I. He told a reporter for the New York Tribune, "Mrs. Stokes and I still have the same ideals, the same aims, but we differ on the means of attaining them." Stokes was so supportive of the war that he enlisted, serving as a major in the New York National Guard because he was too old to serve overseas. His promotion of the war resulted in an invitation to the White House to meet President Woodrow Wilson.

In the meantime, Rose persisted in war and other protests, getting arrested in Kansas City and sentenced to ten years in prison. Although Stokes rushed to his wife's aid and paid her $10,000 bail—and her conviction was overturned—they divorced in 1925. She refused alimony on principle and lived in poverty. When she became ill with cancer, she was unable to pay for a doctor. Their mutual friend Upton Sinclair wrote Stokes, asking for help to cover the cost of her treatment. Stokes replied, "I am now assured by friends of hers in New York, that sufficient funds for her care for a year have been raised. If I could help her without helping her work, much of which appears to me to be so very abominable, I should gladly do so, but I don't see how I can." Rose died of cancer in 1933.

Stokes joined the Liberal Catholic Church in 1925 when it established the Church of St Michael the Archangel in New York City. In April 1926, he married Lettice Lee Sands at the Liberal Catholic Church. She was the daughter of a railroad baron and was much younger than Stokes.

On November 9, 1931, Stokes was among a small group that was the first to meet Meher Baba when he travel to the United States. Stokes invited Bab to stay at his Greenwich Village home at 88 Grove Street whenever he was in New York. Baba stayed for two days in November, and returned in December 1931. On May 22, 1932, the Stokes hosted a dinner party for Baba at their home that had more than 300 guests. They hosted a reception and silent darshan for Baba and some 200 people on December 13, 1934.

Stokes was an active supporter of the Humane Society. He was a member of the City Club of New York, the Knickerbocker Club, the Riding Club, the St. Anthony Club of New York, the University Club of New York, and The Yale Club of New York City.

In 1960, Stokes died at his home on Grove Street in New York City at the age of 88 years.
