= Current Opinion =

Current Opinion may refer to:

- Current Opinion (Elsevier), a series of academic journals published by Elsevier
- Current Opinion (Lippincott Williams & Wilkins), a series of academic journals published by Lippincott Williams & Wilkins
- Current Opinion (Current Drugs), a series of academic journals published by Current Drugs
- Current Literature, an American magazine which was published under the name Current Opinion from 1913 to 1925
