= Carolyn Hamilton (disambiguation) =

Carolyn Hamilton or Caroline Hamilton may refer to:

- Carolyn Hamilton (born 1951), English barrister
- Carolyn Hamilton (historian), South African anthropologist
- Carolyn Hamilton, character in the American television series Wonder Woman (played by Jayne Kennedy)

== See also ==
- Marianne-Caroline Hamilton (1777–1861), Irish artist and memoirist
- Caroline Hamilton Pier (1870–1938), American lawyer
- Lady Caroline Blackwood (Caroline Maureen Hamilton-Temple-Blackwood, 1931–1996), English writer and socialite
- Carolyn Scott-Hamilton (born 1976), American nutritionist, television host and media personality
- Caroline Frances Hamilton (1861–1944), American physician and medical missionary in Turkey
