= Rose Pastor Stokes =

American activist and writer (1879–1933)

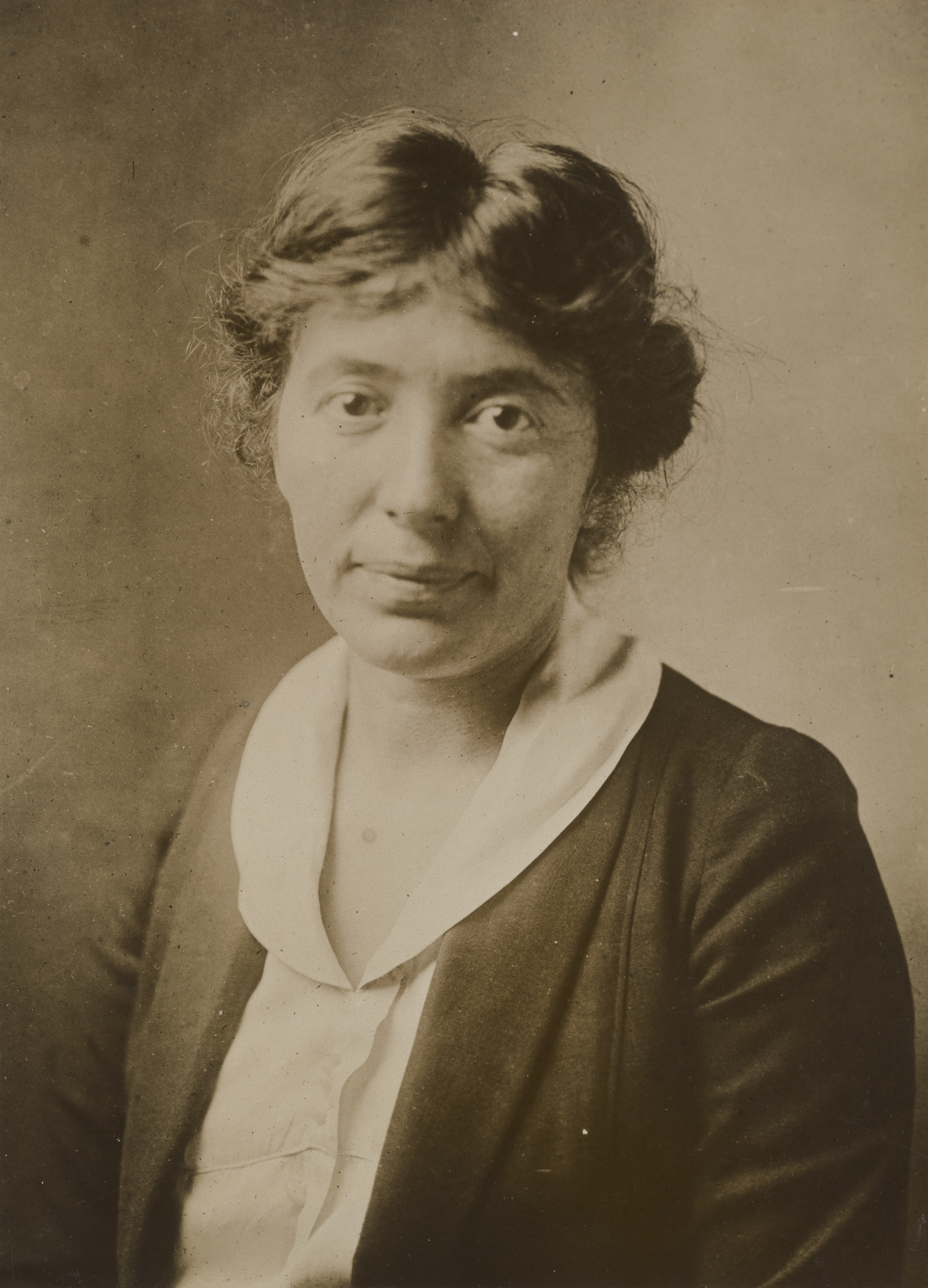
- Portrait by Underwood & Underwood, 1918
- Born: Rose Harriet Wieslander; July 18, 1879; Augustów, Congress Poland, Russian Empire
- Died: June 20, 1933 (aged 53); Frankfurt, Germany
- Occupations: Writer; Labor activist; Birth control advocate
- Political party: Socialist (1905–1917, 1918–1919); Communist (1919–1933)
- Spouses: James Stokes (m. 1905; div. 1925) Jerome Isaac Romain (m. 1929)

Rose Harriet Pastor Stokes (née Wieslander; July 18, 1879 – June 20, 1933) was an American socialist activist, writer, birth control advocate, and feminist. She was a figure of some public notoriety after her 1905 marriage to Episcopalian millionaire J. G. Phelps Stokes, a member of elite New York society, who supported the settlements in New York. Together they joined the Socialist Party. Pastor Stokes continued to be active in labor politics and women's issues, including promoting access to birth control, which was highly controversial at the time.

In 1919, Pastor Stokes was a founding member of the Communist Party of America and helped develop it into the 1930s. In addition to her writing on politics, she wrote poetry and plays; one was produced in 1916 by the Washington Square Players. She started her autobiography in 1924 but had not completed it at her death; it was published in 1992.

== Early life ==
Rose Harriet Wieslander was born into an Orthodox Jewish family in Augustów, in the Russian Empire (present-day Poland) on July 18, 1879, the daughter of Jacob and Hindl (later known as Anna) Wieslander. Her mother had loved a Catholic man, but her father refused to allow her to marry him. Rose's parents separated after she was born, and her father emigrated to the United States. In 1882 when Rose was three, her mother emigrated with her parents and child to London. There Anna married Israel Pastor, who gave his surname to his stepdaughter Rose, and had six more children with Anna. The family lived in the East End, a neighborhood of poor immigrants. Rose Pastor attended classes for a time at the Bell Lane Free School (Israel Zangwill was once a pupil there and later an instructor).

In 1891, when Pastor was twelve, her family immigrated to Cleveland, Ohio, in the United States. In 1892, she took a job in a Cleveland cigar factory, where she worked as a cigar maker for the next eleven years. According to a 1910 New York Times article, her stepfather was reported as having died a few years after the family arrived in Cleveland. Pastor helped support her six siblings and mother.

== Writing and activism ==
During this time, Pastor discovered her talent for writing. Responding to a solicitation from the Yidishes Tageblatt (Jewish Daily News) for letters from Jewish workers, she submitted a letter. When it was published, she was encouraged to write more. The paper continued to publish her letters, in which she expressed her ideas about the working class. The Jewish Daily News hired her and she moved to New York in 1903. She became a columnist in the English-language section, offering advice to other young women. She also wrote human interest features. The paper was published mostly in Yiddish. With a salary of $15 a week, after a couple of years, Pastor had saved enough to bring her mother and siblings from Cleveland to New York City.

In July 1903, Pastor was assigned to interview James Graham Phelps Stokes, known by friends as "Graham", a prominent, wealthy, upper-class businessman who supported a settlement house on the Lower East Side. He had gained media attention because of his high social status and his charitable work for the needy. Descended from families prominent since the colonial history of New England, Stokes was a railway president and prominent in high society. He gave up his mansion at 299 Madison Avenue to be closer to the work he found most satisfying, that of social projects. Stokes moved to the University Settlement on the Lower East Side, which ministered to the masses of new immigrants from Europe. It was near the Jewish Daily News. Pastor praised Stokes' ideals in her article.

Soon, Pastor also became active in work of University Settlement. Her friendship with Stokes deepened, and in early-1905, they announced their engagement. The couple was married on July 18, 1905—her 26th birthday—and joined the Socialist Party of America together soon thereafter. Stokes was an Episcopalian, she Jewish, but neither practiced their religions, instead devoting themselves to Socialism.

In September 1905, together with Upton Sinclair, Jack London, Clarence Darrow, and Florence Kelley, Graham Phelps Stokes helped found the Intercollegiate Socialist Society (ISS) to encourage study and discussion of socialism in colleges. Over the next decade, both Graham and Rose lectured frequently on socialist themes on behalf of the ISS on US college campuses.

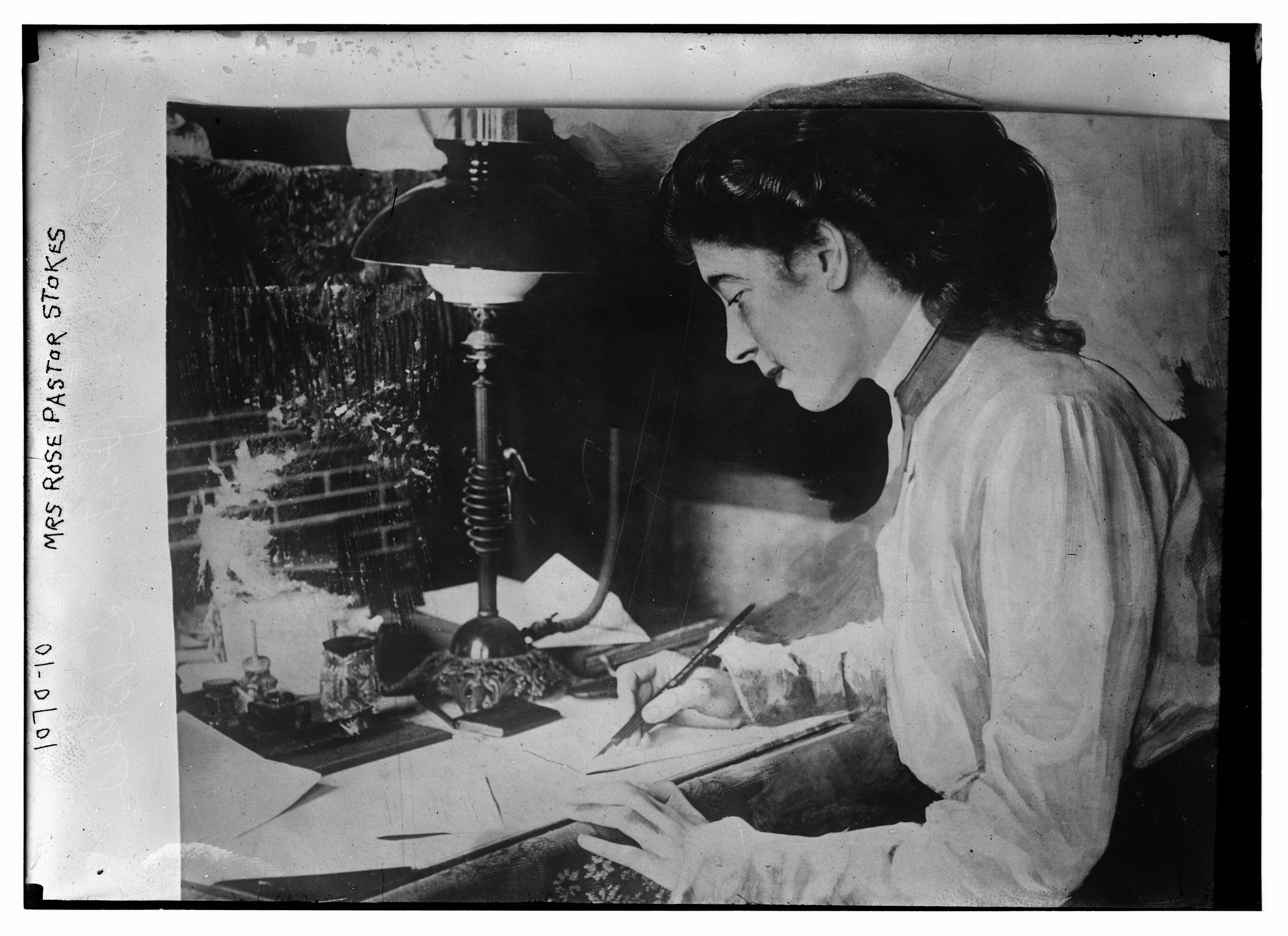
Rose Pastor Stokes at work at her desk c. 1910

In 1909, a few years after their marriage, the Stokeses moved to a house in Westport, Connecticut, where Rose was integrated into her husband's circle of intellectual socialists, including William English Walling, Anna Strunsky Walling and Helen Stokes. Both Graham and Rose Stokes continued their activities on behalf of the Socialist movement. She frequently traveled around the country to speak and debate about the cause and helped picket, strike and organize for specific events. She wrote regularly for the New York Call.

In 1909, Pastor Stokes took part in the Shirtwaist Strike, to show support for the 40,000 garment workers in New York. She attracted media attention because of her marriage to Graham Phelps Stokes, and reporters came to cover her appearance at the strike headquarters at Clinton Hall. She said, "My ideal is that we all be economically interdependent. We should not be independent like millionaires, nor dependent like laborers. My ideal is that we all be interdependent. And I'm not working in a losing cause."

In May and June 1912, Pastor Stokes helped lead a strike by the New York City restaurant and hotel workers. In the winter of 1913, she aided the New York garment workers in another "bitter strike." Graham began to devote more time to writing, but Rose continued her activism. She distributed birth control information, and frequently organized meetings with Margaret Sanger and Emma Goldman, who led efforts for women to have birth control.

She also continued writing, contributing poetry to such publications as The Masses, Independent and The Century Magazine. During this period she also wrote several plays; The Woman Who Wouldn't (1916), about a labor leader, was produced by the Washington Square Players.

== War and prosecution ==
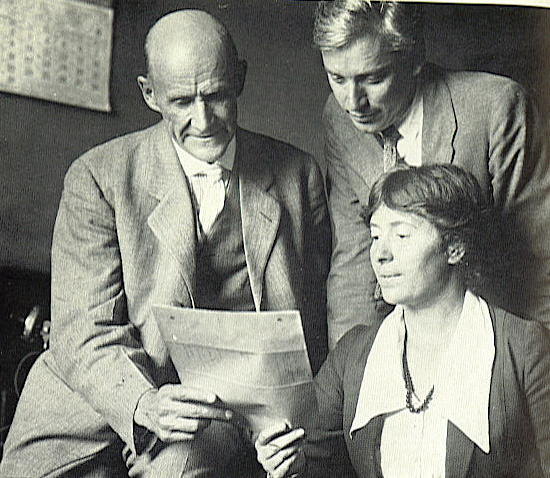
Eugene V. Debs, Max Eastman and Rose Pastor Stokes in 1918

In 1917, the Socialists denounced the American war program. But Graham Stokes withdrew from the party and joined the New York Army National Guard. At first Rose also left the Socialists, as she was disappointed with the party's official position on the war, endorsing "active interference with the war effort". She believed that Germany was a threat to democratic nations. Shortly she rejoined the Socialists, as she doubted whether President Woodrow Wilson's policies furthered international democracy. She became associated with the left wing of the Socialists. In 1919, she was among the founders of the American Communist Party.

Pastor Stokes began to travel throughout the United States, speaking and contributing articles to various newspapers. In 1918, after her comments following a speech in Kansas City were incorrectly reported, Pastor Stokes wrote a letter to the editor of the Kansas City Star in which she criticized US involvement in World War I. She accused the US government of being allied with profiteers. Controversy over the letter led to a federal indictment for violating the Espionage Act of 1917. Pastor Stokes was tried and convicted in Kansas City, Missouri. This was one of several indictments of activist women during the World War I years. Their criticism of the war threatened the national power of the patriotic mothers.

After being sentenced to 10 years in Missouri State prison, Pastor Stokes and her attorney, Seymour Stedman of Chicago, Illinois, successfully appealed to the United States Court of Appeals for the Eighth Circuit in St. Paul, Minnesota. In reaction to this, Pastor Stokes moved to the left in her political leanings. The government ultimately dismissed the case against her in 1920. Judge Walter H. Sanborn authored the opinion that overturned the decision, citing a bias by the District Judge. Despite tensions due to their differing positions on World War I, relations between Pastor Stokes and her husband were relatively congenial.

Graham had been embarrassed before World War I by her public activism related to birth control, not widely accepted, and labor politics. Some of his family were among those who were quite opposed to her politics. With increasing strain between them, in 1925 Graham brought a petition for divorce in Nyack, New York, on grounds of "misconduct by his wife". He won a decree. Pastor Stokes issued a statement denouncing New York's divorce laws, and saying that she and her husband had lived as "friendly enemies" for some time. She said she would cherish her freedom.

By 1929, Pastor Stokes had remarried. Her second husband was Jerome Isaac Romain, a Polish-Russian Jewish immigrant and a language teacher who was seventeen years younger than she. He was an active member of the Communist Party and became its cultural chief in New York. He later changed his name to Victor Jeremy Jerome, called V.J., serving as editor for decades for Political Affairs. The couple lived at 215 Second Avenue on the Lower East Side. But Pastor Stokes also kept her cottage in Westport, and frequently lived there.

== Communist Party activity ==
After World War I, Pastor Stokes had left the Socialist Party again; in 1919, she became a founding member of the Communist Party of America and helped develop it into the 1930s. In 1922, she traveled to Moscow as an American delegate to the Fourth Congress of the Communist International (Comintern). She served there as the reporter for the special Negro Commission at the Congress and adopted the pseudonym "Sasha". After returning to the United States, Stokes was elected to the Executive Committee of the newly formed Workers' Party.

She participated in strikes and made court appearances to support men and women arrested for picketing and/or demonstrating. Her activities were met by spirited anti-Communist opposition during the First Red Scare, such as a 1919 incident in Yonkers, New York, when a group of local men led by Rev. Francis T. Brown loudly sang the "Star-Spangled Banner" to drive her off the stage at a meeting of the Communist Council of America. In 1929 she was arrested for demonstrating during a garment workers' strike. Due to her years of working with activists of the Lower East Side, she was called "Rose of the Ghetto".

She was the most-mentioned woman in American newspapers from 1918 to 1921.

== Death and legacy ==
Pastor Stokes was diagnosed with breast cancer in 1930. In 1933, she went to Germany for radiation therapy. In April 1933, friends collected funds for hospital expenses. Pastor Stokes entered Municipal Hospital in Frankfurt, Germany, on April 15, where she was operated on for cancer by Professor Vito Schmiden. While under treatment, she died in the hospital on June 20, 1933, aged 53. Her body was cremated and her ashes sent to New York, where a memorial service was held at Webster Hall.

At the time of death, Pastor Stokes was working on her autobiography, which she had started in 1924. Before her death, she had sent numerous documents related to her writing to her agents in the United States. She asked her friend Samuel Ornitz, also a communist and a writer, to complete it, sharing her views with him.

He finally abandoned the work in 1937. During the 1950s, he was among the Hollywood Ten, blacklisted after their refusal to testify to the House Un-American Activities Committee (HUAC) during the Joseph McCarthy era of a Red scare.

Her unfinished autobiography was published posthumously in 1992. Pastor Stokes' papers are held by New York University, where they are held at the Tamiment Library and Robert F. Wagner Archives, and at Yale University in New Haven, Connecticut. Much of this material is also available on microfilm.

In 2020, author Adam Hochschild published a biography of Stokes: Rebel Cinderella: From Rags to Riches to Radical, the Epic Journey of Rose Pastor Stokes.

== Works ==
- Phelps Stokes, Rose H (1981). "The Condition of Working Women, from the Working Woman's Viewpoint". In Marcus, Jacob R (ed.). American Jewish Woman; A Documentary History. KTAV Publishing House. p. 538. ISBN 0-87068-752-2.
- Songs of Labor and Other Poems, by Morris Rosenfeld. Translated by Rose Pastor Stokes in collaboration with Helena Frank. Boston: Richard G. Badger, 1914.
- The Woman Who Wouldn't New York/London: G.P. Putnam's Sons 1916, drama.
- Stokes, Rose Pastor (1992). Shapiro, Herbert; Sterling, David L (eds.). I Belong to the Working Class: The Unfinished Autobiography of Rose Pastor Stokes. Athens: University of Georgia Press. ISBN 9780820313832.

== Notes ==
1.During her testimony at her espionage trial in 1918, Stokes reportedly said that at the age of 23 she became the editor of the Jewish Daily News. An "emphatic denial of that statement" was issued by Sarasohn & Son, the publishers of the Jewish Daily News, though they noted that Stokes did write for the English department of the newspaper.
