= Charles Spahr =

Charles Spahr may refer to:

- Charles E. Spahr (1913–2009), American oil industry executive and engineer
- Charles Barzillai Spahr (1860–1904), American political economist
