= Hartley House (New York City) =

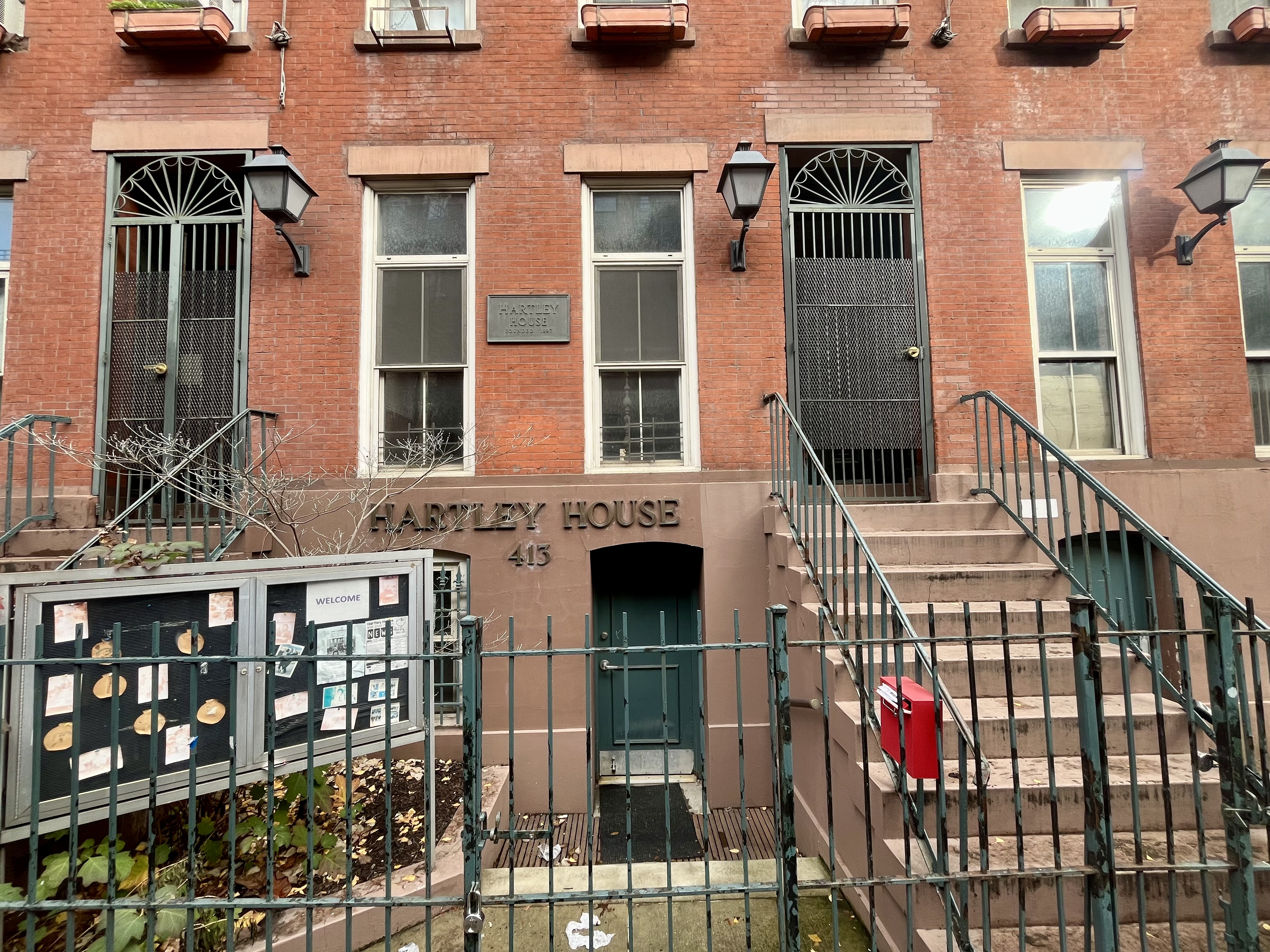
- Hartley House in December 2023
- Formation: use 1897; 129 years ago
- Type: Not for profit corporation
- Legal status: Charity
- Headquarters: 413 West 46th Street, Manhattan
- Location: New York City
- Region served: Hell's Kitchen

Hartley House, formerly known as Hartley House Settlement, is a not for profit corporation, operating since 1897 as a charity serving the Hell's Kitchen neighborhood of Manhattan in New York City. Since its founding, the Hartley House has been operating from 413 West 46th Street in Manhattan.

== Hartley Farms ==
The Hartley Farms are affiliated with the Hartley House Settlement.

== Leadership ==
- May Mathews was Executive Director of Hartley House for 50 years, beginning in the early 1900s following her graduation from Wellesley. Her dedication was commemorated by the naming of a neighborhood playground in her honor.
- Grace Hartley Jenkins Mead (1896–1991) was president of Hartley House from 1940 to 1965; she was the great granddaughter of Robert Milham Hartley

== Other settlement houses in New York City ==
- Lincoln House Settlement – 202 W 63rd Street, Manhattan; founded by the leaders of the Henry Street Settlement to serve New York's African American community
- Henry Street Settlement – Lower East Side, Manhattan; founded in 1893 by Lillian Wald
- Third Street Settlement – 235 E 11th Street, now called Third Street Music School Settlement; founded in 1894 by Emilie Wagner
- Lenox Hill Neighborhood House – 331 E 70th Street; founded in 1894 by the Alumnae Association of Hunter College
- University Settlement House – the oldest settlement house in the United States, founded in 1886 by Stanton Coit, Charles B. Stover, and Carl Schurz
- Union Settlement Association – founded in 1895 by alumni, faculty, and students of Union Theological Seminary at 202 E 69th Street in response to the desperate conditions of immigrants struggling to make a new life in America ... within five months, the agency moved to its present site at 237 E 104th Street

== See also ==
- Settlement movement
