= William George Jordan =

American editor, lecturer and essayist (1864–1928)

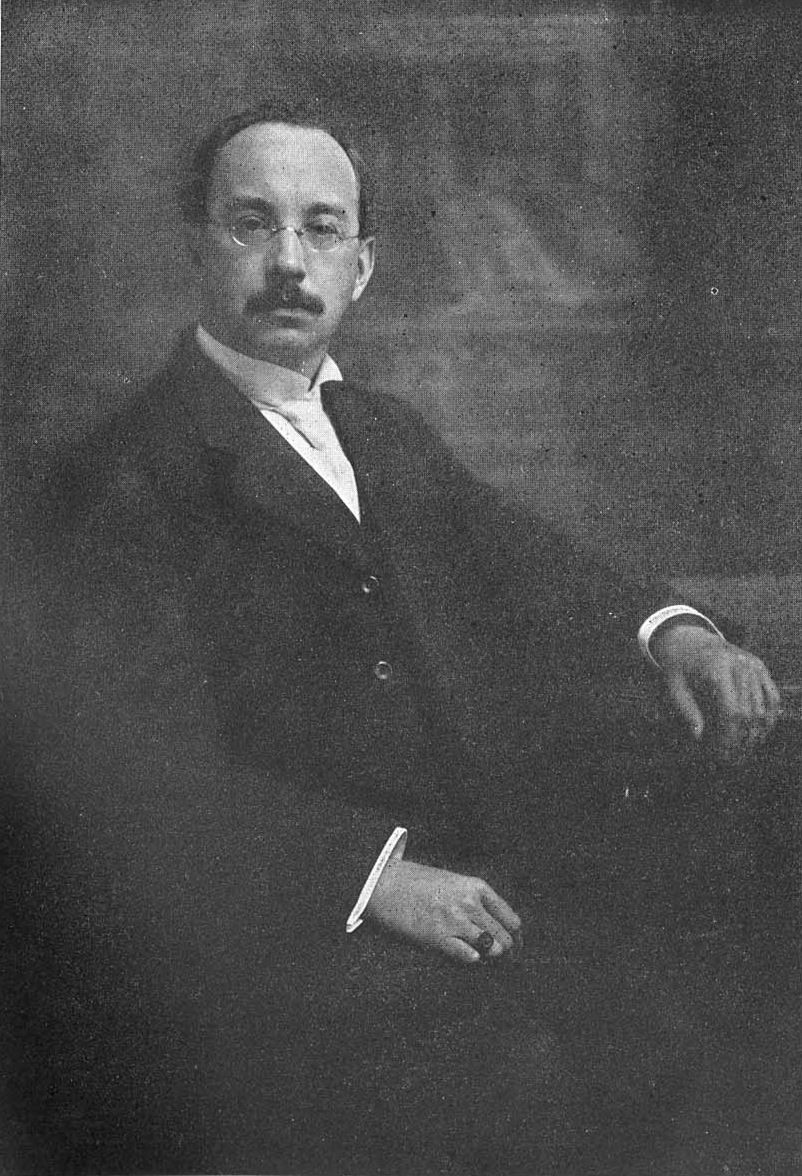
- Born: March 6, 1864; New York City
- Died: April 20, 1928 (aged 64); New York City
- Occupations: editor, lecturer, essayist
- Known for: The Majesty of Calmness

William George Jordan (March 6, 1864 - April 20, 1928) was an American editor, lecturer and essayist.

== Life ==
Jordan was born in New York City on March 6, 1864. He graduated from the City College of New York and began his literary career as editor of Book Chat in 1884. He joined Current Literature in 1888 and became its managing editor. In 1891 he left Current Literature and moved to Chicago where he started a lecture program on his system of Mental Training. He returned to Current Literature in January 1894 as its managing editor and then resigned again in August 1896. In 1897 he was hired as the managing editor for The Ladies Home Journal, after which he edited The Saturday Evening Post (1888–89). From 1899 to 1905 he was the editor and vice-president of Continental Publishing Company. He was the editor of the publication Search-Light between 1905 and 1906.

On July 26 of 1891, the Chicago Inter-Ocean published an interview with Mr. Jordan where he discussed his thoughts about education and "Mental Training." Based on the reception his article received, he decided to relocate to Chicago to host lectures on the subject. The Inter-Ocean in a September 24 article reported that:

During the past few weeks the calls from Chicago have been so numerous, enthusiastic and positive for lecture courses and private society classes that he has concluded to resign his position in New York and come to Chicago.

He remained in Chicago for two years and then returned to Current Literature in 1894. In 1894 he published a short 20-page pamphlet entitled Mental Training, a Remedy for Education (this was republished again in 1907), that summarized his lectures. The opening paragraph starts as follows:

There are two great things that education should do for the individual—It should train his senses, and teach him to think. Education, as we know it to-day, does not truly do either; it gives the individual only a vast accumulation of facts, unclassified, undigested, and seen in no true relations. Like seeds kept in a box, they may be retained, but they do not grow.

This writing style was generally representative of his typical tone and approach.

After he returned to New York, The Literary Review said the following:

Though Mr. Jordan has won a fine reputation as an editor he is one of the youngest of the magazine editors in this city. He has delivered many lectures on mental training in New York, Chicago, Minneapolis, and other cities, and his system has been received with great favor in all of these. During the last year he has brought Current Literature to a place of really notable excellence by the keen watchfulness which he keeps over the literary work that is being done both in this country and in England, by his catholic taste, and by his swift judgment. Besides being a first-rate editor and lecturer he is an admirable writer, as his vigorous editorials prove. Thus far nearly all of his contributions to the magazine have been unsigned, and his forthcoming book, it is thought, will establish his reputation as an author with a distinct and forcible style as well as of strong and original thought.

He published his first book, The Kingship of Self-Control, in 1898 and his last in 1926, two years before his death.

In 1907 he published a pamphlet entitled The House of Governors; A New Idea in American Politics Aiming to Promote Uniform Legislation on Vital Questions, to Conserve States Rights, to Lessen Centralization, to Secure a Fuller, Freer Voice of the People, and to Make a Stronger Nation. This work was circulated to each state governor, US President Theodore Roosevelt and members of his cabinet. The concept was well received, and the first meeting of the governors was held in Washington January 18 through 20, 1910. Jordan was elected secretary of this body at the first meeting and then dropped as secretary in September 1911. Nevertheless, the group became part of his legacy, and his part in its formation was often cited in later references to him by the press.

Jordan was married to Nellie Blanche Mitchell on May 6, 1922, in New York City at the Grace Episcopal Church.

He died of pneumonia in New York City on 20 April 1928 at his home.

== Works ==
Jordan wrote a number of personal improvement and self-help books in the early 1900s, one of the most popular being The Majesty of Calmness.

His other works include:

- Mental Training, 1894
- The Kingship of Self-Control, 1898
- The Majesty of Calmness, 1900
- The Power of Truth, 1902
- Self-Control, Its Kingship and Majesty, 1905, The Kingship of Self-Control and The Majesty of Calmness published as a single book.
- The House of Governors, 1907
- The Crown of Individuality, 1909
- The Power of Purpose, 1910, subset of The Crown of Individuality.
- Little Problems of Married Life, 1910
- Five National Platforms: Dissected, Classified and Indexed, 1912
- What Every American Should Know, A Voters Handbook of the Presidential Campaign …, 1916
- Feodor Vladimir Larrovitch: An Appreciation of His Life and Works, 1918
- What Every American Should Know About the League of Nations, 1919
- One Hundred Years of Fire Insurance, 1919 — co-authored with Henry R. Gall
- The Trusteeship of Life, 1921
- Charles Waldo Haskins, An American Pioneer in Accountancy, 1923
- At the Historic Center of the United States—The New Independence Building, 1925 – co-authored with William C. Sproul, and Howell Lewis Shay
- The Vision of High Ideals, 1926. This books consists of the last three chapters from The Trusteeship of Life

The rights to The Power of Truth were purchased by Heber J. Grant, president of the Church of Jesus Christ of Latter-day Saints, in conjunction with the Deseret Book Company around 1933. Grant had come across the book while in England sometime between 1903 and 1906. He purchased more than four thousand copies from the English publisher and before leaving England ordered another thousand. He also distributed more than seven thousand copies of just the first chapter. In a letter to Jordan dated October 5, 1907, Grant said: "I know of no book of the same size, that has made a more profound impression upon my mind, and whose teachings I consider of greater value."
