= Nevada Central Railroad =

Narrow gauge railroad between Battle Mountain and Austin, Nevada

Overview
- Headquarters: Austin, Nevada
- Locale: Battle Mountain - Austin, Nevada
- Dates of operation: 1879–1938

Technical
- Track gauge: 3 ft (914 mm)

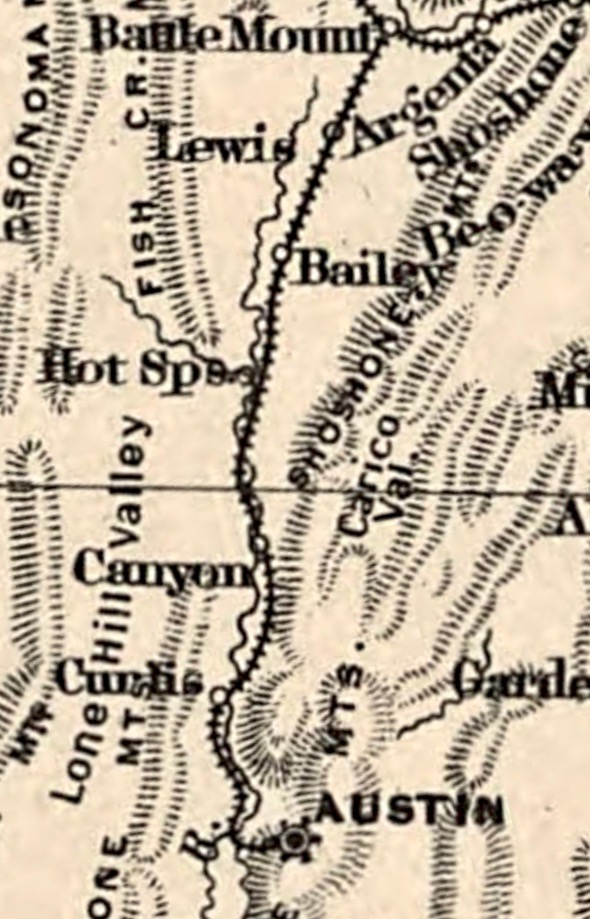
Route in 1883

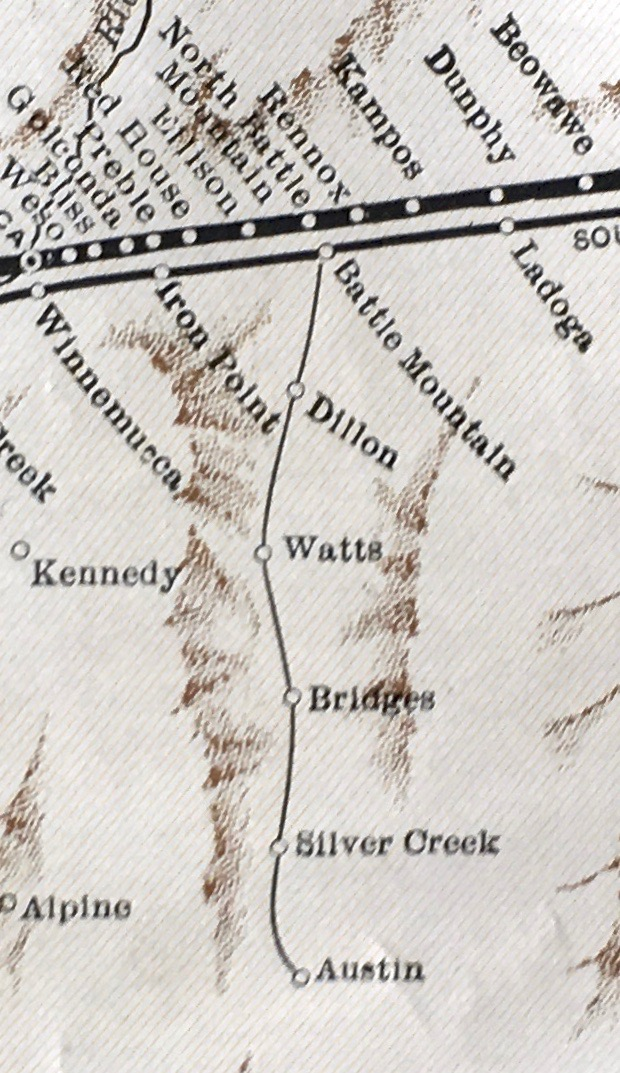
Route in 1931

The Nevada Central Railroad was a 3 ft (914 mm) narrow gauge railroad completed in 1880 between Battle Mountain and Austin, Nevada. The railroad was constructed to connect Austin, the center of a rich silver mining area, with the Southern Pacific transcontinental railroad, at Battle Mountain.

However, by the time that the line was finished, the boom was almost over. Major silver production ended by 1887, although there was a slight revival later.

== History ==
Austin was founded in 1862, as part of a silver rush reputedly triggered by a Pony Express rider, William Talcott whose horse kicked over a rock. By summer 1863, Austin and the surrounding Reese River Mining District had a population of over 10,000, and it became the county seat of Lander County. The Central Pacific Railroad came through Battle Mountain, Nevada in 1868, but the cost to get from Austin to Battle Mountain was high. Stage passengers paid $15 for the 90-mile ride, and freight cost $1.25 per hundred pounds, and more if the road was wet. Lumber was brought in by 18-mule teams, which often spent days stuck in the mud, and cost $80 or more per thousand feet. Only the highest grade ore was shipped because transportation cost too much to make shipping the lower grades profitable. Austin was more than desirous of building a railroad, and the significantly lower freight rates that it would bring.

In 1871 the Manhattan Silver Mining Company had consolidated most of the claims. The company grew to have a lot of influence in the area and its secretary M.J. Farrell was the state senator for Lander County. Farrell estimated that building a railroad would result in transportation costs being cut in half.

He set out to fix the lack of a railroad with a controversial project, approved only after a bitter debate in the 1874 legislature, overriding the Governor's veto. The legislature authorized Lander County in 1875 to grant a $200,000 of its bonds as a subsidy to build a railroad, a time limit of five years was set to finish the project.

The Nevada Central Railroad (NCRR) wasn't started until 4½ years later. Anson Phelps Stokes, the grandson of the founder of the Phelps Dodge Corporation, and a partner in the mining company came to town. Stokes brought in General James H. Ledlie, a former Union officer in the Civil War. The crews went to work desperately, only to bring the line within 2 miles (3.2 km) of the Austin town limits with less than a day left before the deadline. A popular story states that an emergency meeting of the Austin Town Board extended the town limits by two miles and the last rails were laid just minutes before the deadline. However, historian Mallory Hope Ferrell finds no evidence in newspapers or court records to support this story (The railroad beat the deadline, but without needing a change in city limits). The line from Battle Mountain to Austin was 92 miles (148 km). Nevada Central was only profitable as long as the mines at Austin were operating at full capacity.

Stokes' son, James Graham Phelps Stokes, was president of the NCRR from 1898 to 1938. By the middle 1930s most of the mines that generated traffic at Battle Mountain were shut down and boarded up and the NCRR had passed into receivership for the last time in 1938.

== Steam Locomotives ==
#	Builder	Type	SN	Built	Acq	Ret	Disposition	Notes
1	Brook Locomotive Works	2-6-0	230	5/1875	1879	1880	Sold to Utah Eastern #1	
1	Baldwin Locomotive Works	2-6-0	Unknown	1881	1881	1938	Scrapped	Sister engine to second #2.
2	Mason Machine Works	0-4-4t	461	7/1872	1879	1881	Renumbered #3	Purchased from Eureka & Palisade #1. See history.
2	Baldwin Locomotive Works	2-6-0	5575	4/1881	1881	1938	Sold to Ward Kimball	See below.
3	Baldwin Locomotive Works	2-6-0	3625	7/1874	1879	1880	Sold to Utah Eastern #3	Purchased from the Monterey & Salinas Valley #1.
3	Mason Machine Works	0-4-4t	461	7/1872	1881	1882	Sold to Utah & Northern #45	Was #2. See history.
4	Baldwin Locomotive Works	4-4-0	3682	1875	1879	1938	Scrapped	Purchased from the Monterey & Salinas Valley #2.
5	Baldwin Locomotive Works	4-4-0	3843	3/1876	1879	1938	Sold to Golden Gate International Exposition	See history. Built for the North Pacific Coast #12. Preserved at the California State Railroad Museum.
6	Baldwin Locomotive Works	2-6-0	4562	3/1879	1924	1938	Sold to Golden Gate International Exposition	See history. Purchased from Nevada Short Line #1. Preserved at the California State Railroad Museum.

== Remaining equipment ==
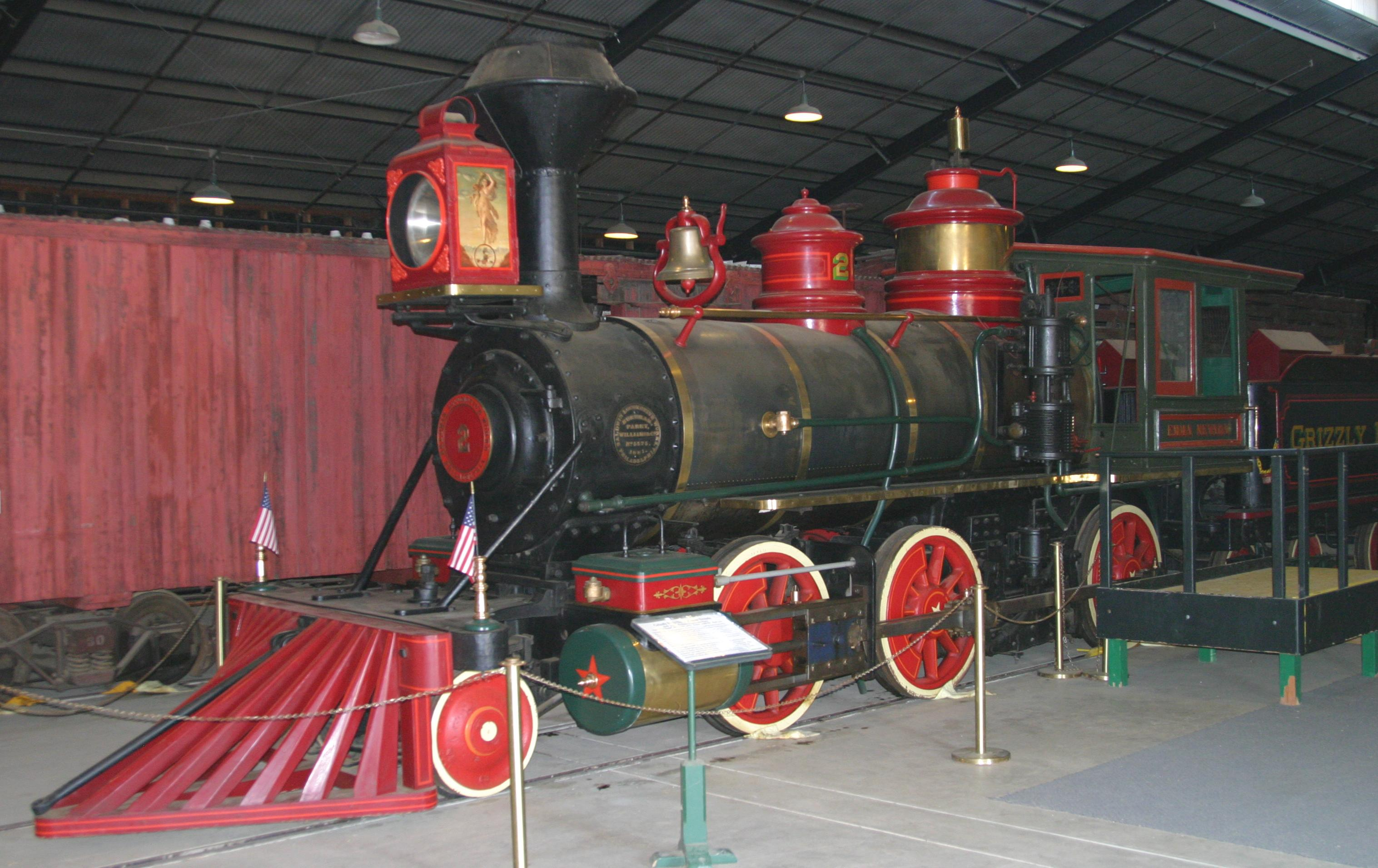
Emma Nevada (former Nevada Central #2) at the Southern California Railway Museum.

- The Emma Nevada once named "Sidney Dillon" (Nevada Central #2) is an 1881 Baldwin Locomotive Works 2-6-0 "Mogul" 3 ft (914 mm) narrow gauge steam locomotive purchased by Disney animator Ward Kimball and his wife Betty for their backyard "Grizzly Flats Railroad" in 1938. Originally built for the short line Nevada Central Railroad connecting Battle Mountain with Austin, the beautifully restored locomotive features Kimball's own artwork on the cab and headlight and was finally fired up in 1942. Complaints of Kimball's neighbors because of the coal smoke forced Kimball to sideline the locomotive in 1951 and operated his railroad with a small 0-4-2T locomotive. Kimball, one of the Orange Empire Railway Museum's founders, donated the locomotive to the museum and it can be seen today in the museum's "Grizzly Flats" car barn. The Orange Empire Railway Museum is now known as the Southern California Railway Museum.
