= The Power of Truth =

William George Jordan self-help book

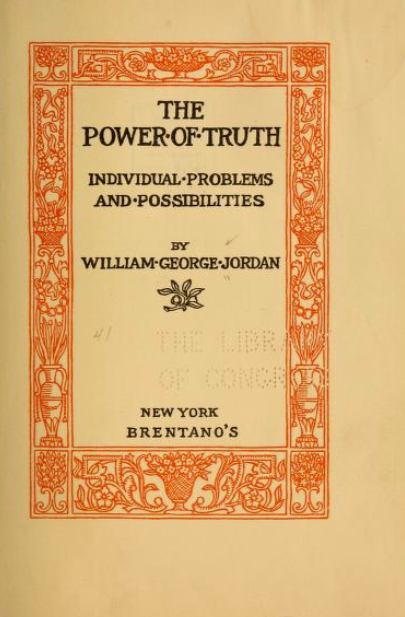
- Title page for The Power of Truth (1902)
- Author: William George Jordan
- Language: English
- Genre: Self-help
- Publication date: 1902
- Publication place: United States
- Pages: 151

The Power of Truth: Individual problems and possibilities, is a book written by essayist and Saturday Evening Post editor, William George Jordan first published in 1902. It is a self-help book that was originally 151 pages long. Circa 1933 the copyright and printing plates for this book were purchased by Heber J. Grant, the president of the Church of Jesus Christ of Latter-day Saints, in conjunction with Deseret Book Company, from Nellie Jordan, William's widow. Deseret Book re-published it in 1935 as the 8th edition. Grant first encountered the book while he was in England between 1903 and 1906 serving as president of the LDS Church's European Mission. He purchased over 4,000 copies of it before returning to the United States. He thereafter started a long-running correspondence with William George Jordan.
