= Pauline Arnoux MacArthur =

American clubwoman, writer, pianist and librettist

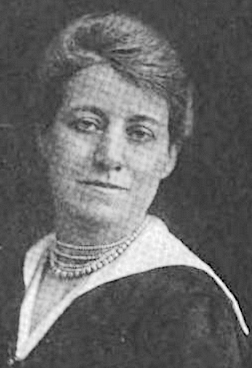
- Pauline Arnoux MacArthur, from a 1915 publication
- Born: Pauline Arnoux; 1867; New York
- Died: May 22, 1941 (aged 73); New York
- Occupations: Librettist, writer, clubwoman

Pauline Arnoux MacArthur (1867 – May 22, 1941) was an American clubwoman, writer, pianist and librettist.

== Early life ==
Pauline Arnoux was the daughter of judge William H. Arnoux and Pauline Arnoux. She claimed to be Austrian royalty, through a grandmother who was a princess.

== Career ==
=== Activism ===
MacArthur was active in social causes, including bringing concerts to prisons and to settlement houses. She was president of the Women's Auxiliary of the University Settlement Society of New York. During World War I, MacArthur was founder and president of Le Cercle Rochambeau, a women's war relief organization, and president of the National Association for Mothers of Defenders of Democracy. She had an apartment on the Champs-Élysées in Paris, and may have been involved in the Allied secret service during the war. She wrote "Short Talk on Suffrage" (1915), noting that "We suffer from inertia and from the dread of big changes which seem in the nature of upheavals. We will often go on reading in a failing light rather than move and turn on a full light."

She was active in the National Council of Women's Department of Community Music, and founder and president of New York's Thursday Musical Club. She was not a professional pianist, but played socially, on the radio, and at benefit concerts with other musicians.

=== The Apocalypse ===
As a librettist, MacArthur was known as co-writer (with Henri Pierre Roché) of The Apocalypse (1921), a dramatic oratorio. The Apocalypse was based on Biblical themes (with sections titled "Belshazzar's Feast", "Armageddon", "Babylon", and "The Millennium"), but also had clear references to the more recent trauma of World War I. The National Federation of Music Clubs held a contest, and awarded $5000 to the MacArthur/Roché libretto and the music by Paolo Gallico. The Apocalypse was first performed at the Federation's biennial meeting in Davenport, Iowa, in 1921; the following year, was performed by the Oratorio Society of New York, at Carnegie Hall.

== Personal life ==
Pauline Arnoux married lawyer and diplomat John Roofe MacArthur II in 1889. They divorced in 1930. She died in 1941, in New York, aged 73 years.
