= Howard Brubaker =

- Born: June 26, 1882; Warsaw, Indiana
- Died: February 2, 1957 (aged 74); Greens Farms, Connecticut
- Known for: Magazine editor and writer

Howard Brubaker (June 26, 1882 – February 2, 1957) was an American magazine editor and writer.

Brubaker was born in Warsaw, Indiana and attended Indiana University. In 1902 he moved to New York, where he lived at the University Settlement House for several years before becoming an associate editor for Success from 1907 to 1911. He went on to become an editor for Collier's Weekly (1914–19) and The Liberator (1918–24) as well as a contributor to many other magazines including The New Yorker, The Saturday Evening Post, Life, The New Republic and Country Gentleman.

He published over 100 short stories and a number of non-fiction pieces on contemporary affairs, especially national politics, in which he tended to espouse a left-of-center viewpoint. He was best known for "Of All Things", a by-liner column that ran weekly in The New Yorker magazine from 1925 to 1951. This column was composed of a series of brief paragraphs that offered humorous and satirical comments on contemporary happenings and personages. Many of these witticisms were reprinted in newspapers across the country. Brubaker died at his home in Greens Farms, Connecticut, at the age of 74.

== Bibliography ==
- Brubaker, Howard (1917). Ranny, otherwise Randolph Harrington Dukes : a tale of those activities which made him an important figure in his town, in his family – and in other families. New York: Harper & Brothers.
- — (May 9, 1925). "Of all things". The New Yorker. 1 (12): 17.
- — (May 16, 1925). "Of all things". The New Yorker. 1 (13): 17.
- — (May 23, 1925). "Of all things". The New Yorker. 1 (14): 19.
- — (May 30, 1925). "Of all things". The New Yorker. 1 (15): 6.
- — (June 6, 1925). "Of all things". The New Yorker. 1 (16): 6.
- — (June 13, 1925). "Of all things". The New Yorker. 1 (17): 6.
- Ray, Felix (1932). White House blues : Elmer Durkin, the garrulous newsdealer, expresses his thoughts upon the current administration. Illustrated by Frueh. New York: Vanguard Press. (Note: Felix Ray is a Brubaker pseudonym.)
- Brubaker, Howard (January 1, 1938). "Of all things". The New Yorker. 13 (46): 30.

———————
