= Elizabeth Sprague Williams =

Social worker (1869 – 1922)

- Born: August 31, 1869; Buffalo, New York, U.S.
- Died: August 19, 1922 (aged 52); New York City, New York, U.S.
- Education: Smith College (B.S.)
- Alma mater: Columbia University (A.M.), Barnard College
- Occupation: Social worker
- Known for: Settlement house movement, social work

Elizabeth Sprague Williams (August 31, 1869 – August 19, 1922) was an American social worker notable for her involvement in the settlement house movement. She was a leader at the Rivington Street Settlement in New York City, where she developed programs aimed at helping immigrants assimilate through educational, recreational, and vocational club activities. Williams also participated in reconstruction work in Serbia, where she was recognized for her contributions. Her work in improving the lives of immigrants and developing club-based social work programs has had a lasting influence on the field.

== Biography ==
=== Early life and education ===
Elizabeth Sprague Williams was born on August 31, 1869, in Buffalo, New York, to Frank Williams, a civil engineer and businessman, and Olive French, a former schoolteacher. She attended Smith College, earning a Bachelor of Science degree in 1891. During her time at Smith, Williams developed an interest in the settlement house movement and joined the newly founded College Settlement Association (CSA) in 1889.

After graduating, Williams returned to Buffalo and helped establish a settlement house with the support of her local Unitarian congregation. Although she received some professional backing from the CSA, the challenges of settlement work led her to seek more formal training. In 1896, she moved to New York City to enroll at Columbia University, where she earned a Master of Arts degree in 1897. She continued her studies at Barnard College for two additional years.

=== Career ===
In 1896, Williams joined the Rivington Street Settlement in New York as a resident and was appointed head worker in 1898. She remained in this role until 1919, with a sabbatical year in 1911–1912 to establish a settlement in Lackawanna City, New York. At Rivington Street, Williams focused on improving the living and working conditions of the neighborhood's residents and emphasized the "Americanization" of immigrants. She developed various programs to teach immigrants the responsibilities and civic values necessary for integration into American society.

==== Club work and community programs ====
Under Williams's leadership, the Rivington Street Settlement emphasized club work. These clubs included literary, social, and athletic activities, offering immigrants alternatives to urban entertainments. They also provided vocational skills such as sewing, cooking, and woodworking, as well as intellectual pursuits like debating, reading, and music. Williams believed that club membership fostered self-control and cooperation, essential for effective citizenship. She regularly reported to the CSA that these clubs functioned as "small republics," teaching practical measures and civic values of self-government.

Williams and the settlement's residents were also involved in various associations, including the local school board, the Charity Organization Society, the Consumers' League, the Public Education Association, the Outdoor Recreation League, and the New York Committee on Amusements and Vacation Resources of Working Girls.

In 1896, Williams founded "Mount Ivy," a summer home community for the settlement located in Rockland County, New York. This rural setting provided a place for immigrants to enjoy nature and reinforced the Americanization efforts of the Rivington Street Settlement. The cooperative and simple lifestyle at Mount Ivy was designed to promote self-government and cooperation.

=== Later life ===
In 1919, Williams left the Rivington Street Settlement to join several Smith College alumnae in reconstruction work in Serbia. She served as head of an orphanage in Veles, Serbia, for two years, learning the native language to communicate better with the children. The children affectionately called her "Mother Elizabeth." In 1921, she returned to the United States with a two-year-old orphan girl, she had adopted. The Serbian government took over the orphanage, continuing the programs Williams had introduced. She was posthumously awarded a Serbian royal decoration for her work.

Elizabeth Sprague Williams died from cancer in New York City on August 19, 1922. She never married and had an adopted daughter. A group of her friends and colleagues took responsibility for the care and education of her adopted daughter, honoring Williams's dedication to improving others' lives.

== Sources ==
- Schulte, Janet E. (February 2000). "Williams, Elizabeth Sprague". American National Biography. New York: Oxford University Press. doi:10.1093/anb/9780198606697.article.1500858. (subscription required)
- Radcliffe College (1971). James, Edward T.; James, Janet Wilson; Boyer, Paul S. (eds.). Notable American Women, 1607-1950: A Biographical Dictionary. Vol. 2 (illustrated, reprint ed.). Harvard University Press. pp. 619–620. ISBN 9780674627345.
