= Jean Spahr =

American social reformer

- Born: Jean Gurney Fine; 1861; Chambersburg, Pennsylvania, USA
- Died: September 25, 1935 (aged 73–74); New York City, USA
- Other name: Jean Fine Spahr
- Education: Smith College
- Organization: Rivington Street Settlement
- Known for: Social reform
- Movement: Settlement movement
- Spouse: Charles Barzillai Spahr (m. 1892; died 1904)
- Children: 5 daughters
- Relatives: Henry Burchard Fine (brother)

Jean Gurney Spahr (née Fine; 1861 – September 25, 1935) was an American social reformer. A pioneer in the U.S. settlement movement, she was a co-founder and officer of the College Settlements Association (CSA), and the head of the Rivington Street Settlement in New York City.

== Early life and education ==
Jean Gurney Fine was born in Chambersburg, Pennsylvania, 1861. Her parents were Lambert Suydam and Mary Ely (Burchard) Fine. Her siblings included the educators, Henry Burchard Fine, John B. Fine, and May Margaret Fine.

She graduated from Smith College with a B.A. degree in 1883.

== Career ==
Spahr taught at Clinton College (Kentucky, 1883–1885); and at the Brearley School (New York City, 1885–1889).

After teaching at Brearley School, Spahr went to London and visited Toynbee Hall where she became acquainted with the British-model of the settlement movement. Back in New York City in 1889, Spahr shared the idea with other college women and proposed the establishment of a settlement home in the city's Lower East Side at 95 Rivington Street. Spahr became the headworker of the New York College Settlement from 1889 until her marriage in 1892, to Charles B. Spahr, a co-founder of the University Settlement Society of New York.

Her focus was not on "do something for" the poor, but rather living with them and seeing them as equals. After her marriage, she continued as a director of the settlement. In 1935, she was serving as honorary president of the "Art Workshop for Industrial and College Women", a change in programming initiated by the New York College Settlement five years earlier.

Spehr was a member of the Smith College Alumnae Association, and served as president of the Present Day Club of Princeton. She was also active in woman's suffrage work.

== Personal life and death ==
On July 5, 1892, at Princeton, New Jersey, she married Charles Barzillai Spahr, Ph.D. (1860–1904), political economist, author, and associate editor of the Outlook. They had five daughters: Margaret (b. 1893), Elizabeth Fine (b. 1894), Mary Burchard (b. 1896), Jean Gurney (b. 1899), and Helen Thayer (b. 1902).

In religion, she was a Presbyterian.

Jean Spahr died of pneumonia in New York City on September 25, 1935. In her will, she bequeathed US$10,000 for the endowment of graduate fellowships at Smith College.
