= Rivington Street Settlement =

Settlement house in New York City

Rivington Street Settlement (New York College Settlement)
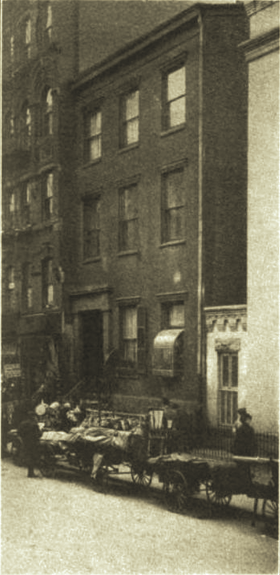
- Rivington Street Settlement (1914)
- Purpose: social reform
- Headquarters: 95 Rivington Street
- Coordinates: 40°43′12.3″N 73°59′19″W
- Region served: Lower East Side of the Manhattan
- Headworker: Jean Gurney Fine Spahr
- Parent organization: College Settlements Association

Rivington Street Settlement (also known as the New York College Settlement) was an American settlement house which provided educational and social services on the Lower East Side of the Manhattan borough of New York City, New York. Under the auspices of the College Settlements Association (CSA), it focused on the mostly immigrant population of the neighborhood. Originally located at 95 Rivington Street (1889-), other locations later included 96 Rivington Street (1892-1901), 188 Ludlow Street (1902–), 84-86 First Street (1907-), and Summer Home, Mount Ivy, New York (1900-). The Rivington Street Settlement was established by college women, was controlled by college women, and had a majority of college women as residents. The Rivington Street Settlement was a kind of graduate school in economics and sociology, with practical lessons in a tenement–house district - a kind of sociological laboratory.

== History ==
The first Rivington Street Settlement house was established September 1, 1889, by the CSA with Jean Gurney Fine Spahr as head worker, with the purpose of "establishing a home in a neighborhood of working people in which educated women might live, in order to furnish a common meeting ground for all classes for their mutual benefit and education". The CSA organized to support this and other settlements. It was maintained by yearly donations from CSA and funds raised by local executive committee. Residents of the neighborhood were predominantly Jews.

Early in the year 1891, No. 95 Rivington Street, which had been occupied by the Rivington Street Settlement ever since its foundation, was thrown suddenly upon the market. But the Settlement was not in a position financially to purchase the property, nor legally, being unincorporated, to hold it. At this crisis, six friends of the settlement being found willing to advance at four per cent, the $23,400 necessary to its purchase (equivalent to $800,000 in 2025), the Riving Settlement Company was organized to buy and hold the property for the Settlement's use, the officers of this company being the Treasurer of the Settlement and two of her predecessors in office. Mortgage bonds, bearing four per cent interest, were issued to the original subscribers, to the amounts of the respective subscriptions, the New York Settlement undertaking to pay, in lieu of rent, the interest on these bonds, the taxes, insurance and outside repairs. the bonds did not fall due until 1922, but the right to redeem any or all of the in September or March of any year was specially reserved. It was hoped that the Settlement, through the generosity of its friends, would be enabled by gradual redemption to acquire all the bonds and become virtual possessor of the property.

== Activities ==
=== Investigations ===
For many years, the Rivington Street Settlement carried on a series of sociological studies; largely into aspects of women's and children's life and labor. It also carried on a number of special local studies; into unemployment, 1894; data for the Tenement House Committee, 1894-1900; for the Reinhard Committee in 1895; into conditions of working women; into evictions in 1897; the congestion exhibit and many others.

=== Efforts for district improvement ===
(1) Housing. In 1894-5 and again in 1900, the Rivington Street Settlement gave testimony before housing commissions. In 1899-1900, four residents lived for a year in a neighborhood tenement, and reported findings on the experience. The Rivington Street Settlement provided material for the Congestion Exhibit in 1908. In addition, much educational work was done in reporting sanitary delinquencies and stimulating tenants to their own responsibility.

(2) Streets and refuse. There was constant work for better sanitary conditions. In 1894-5, the Rivington Street Settlement helped the commissioner of streets in a neighborhood publicity plan; in 1894, it protested against the unjust treatment of push-cart peddlers.

(3) Play spaces. There was co-operation in the various movements for more parks and playgrounds. In 1897-8, the Rivington Street Settlement became the headquarters of the East Side Recreation Society; stimulated the board of education to organize vacation school playgrounds; and took into residence one of the official school visitors.

(4) Public schools. Close relations with the schools of the district. Since 1889, it endeavored to create public opinion in favor of adequate facilities for children of school age. Early placed small libraries in the schools; entered into hearty co-operation with the teachers in efforts for individual children; carried on informal school visiting; provided a night school after the public night school closed; kindergartens; a special day class for children unprovided for; special work with backward children; and for some years at different times has had a resident as school inspector for the ward. The head worker of the Rivington Street Settlement was a member of the local school board for eight years.

(5) Labor. In 1894, the Rivington Street Settlement secured moral and financial support for the garment makers, and since that time, interested itself in such unions as it could reach. It gave testimony before all legislative committees and other organizations looking toward the betterment of the working conditions of women and children; and its various studies into the work of women and children were potent in awakening public opinion. In connection with other agencies, it made numerous efforts to secure the enforcement of labor laws in the stores and factories of its quarter.

(6) Economic. Assisted the University Settlement in its co-operative experiment of 1893. Headquarters for relief work in the economic depression of 1893-4; and in the depression of 1900 and 1907-8, kept neighborhood needs before the public and rendered assistance to its own clientele.

=== Local institutional improvement ===
The Rivington Street Settlement provided public baths for women; maintained a private playground in its yard; a library service, and for some years a visiting library service. The NYSC also started a music school which later developed into the Third Street Music School Settlement.

== Operations ==
In 1911, twelve women and two men resided at the Rivington Street Settlement.

A potent factor of the Rivington Street Settlement was in keeping the needs of the district before the city; in educating the well-to-do to the human interest of the East Side; and in bringing the college women of the East to a knowledge of modern urban conditions.

The Rivington Street Settlement maintained a kindergarten (nursing service discontinued); school visiting; gymnasium and boys' club house; athletic association; cooking school; gymnastic, singing and dancing class; clubs for married women, men, young people and children; entertainments, concerts, lectures, etc.

Summer work included house open for dances and games; gymnasium organized as a playground; back yard playground; ice-water fountain; flowers; picnics and excursions; summer home at Mount Ivy, New York, perhaps the most consistent piece of settlement summer vacation work in the country.

== Notable people ==
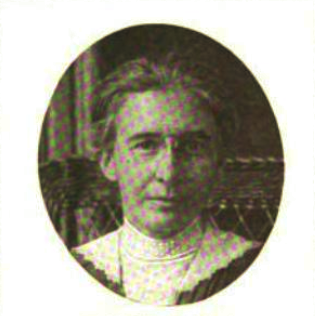
Elizabeth Williams ("The Survey", 1914)

- Caroline Frances Hamilton, physician, before 1892
- Fannie W. McLean, resident, July, 1892-July, 1893
- Dr. Jane Elizabeth Robbins, resident, 1893-Jan. I, 1898
- Eleanor Roosevelt, taught calisthenics and dancing
- Mary Kingsbury Simkhovitch, resident, Jan., 1898-Nov., 1898
- Jean Gurney Fine Spahr, resident, Oct., 1889-July, 1892
- Elizabeth Sprague Williams, resident, Nov. I, 1898
- Helen Rand Thayer, co-founder

== See also ==
- Settlement and community houses in the United States
