= Carolyn Scott-Hamilton =

Carolyn Scott-Hamilton (also known as Carolyn Scott; born August 24, 1976) is an American nutritionist. She is a bilingual TV show host and media personality, holistic nutritionist, vegan chef, cookbook author, consultant and speaker.

== Life ==
Scott-Hamilton was born in Bogotá, Colombia. She launched The Healthy Voyager travel show in 2006, which was followed by the launch of her online magazine, HealthyVoyager.com, as well as a number of other products, services and shows, including her cooking show, The Healthy Voyager's Global Kitchen. She is a double major graduate of the University of Miami and received her master's degree in Holistic Nutrition and PhD in Naturopathic Medicine from Clayton College. She also holds various culinary certifications.

Scott-Hamilton was featured on the Discovery Channel and has appeared on The Better Show, Hallmark Home & Family, CNN, HLN, Daytime, EXTRA TV, the Ricki Lake Show, NBC affiliates, and many other national shows. In 2011, Scott-Hamilton published her first cookbook, The Healthy Voyager's Global Kitchen.

In 2013, she developed vegan and gluten free dishes for Knott's Berry Farm theme park in Buena Park, California and continues to consult around the globe on nutrition, recipe and menu creation and special diets for hotels, cruise lines, restaurants, companies and more.

Scott-Hamilton published her first cookbook, The Healthy Voyager's Global Kitchen: 150 Plant-Based Recipes from Across the Globe with Fair Winds Press in 2011. Her second cookbook, the 10-year anniversary of The Healthy Voyager's Global Kitchen: 175 Plant-Based Recipes from Across the Globe, was published in December 2021. In the Spring of 2024, Carolyn launched her third cookbook, "The Healthy Voyager's Global Kitchen:Latin America".

Her travel show, The Healthy Voyager, has been syndicated around the world online on a wide variety of digital channels such as MSN Travel, Yahoo Travel, AOL On, Tastemade, Cooking Channel and many others. Her podcast, Healthy Voyager Radio, is available on all major podcast networks such as Spotify, Audacy, IHeartRadio, iTunes and more.
