= Current Literature =

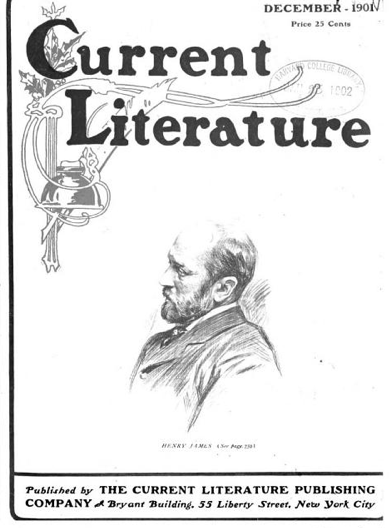
Current Literature, 1901 (with portrait of Henry James)

Current Literature was an American magazine published in New York City from 1888 to 1925. Its first owner and editor, Frederick Somers, debuted the periodical in July 1888. Editors and contributors included: George W. Cable, Bliss Carman, Leonard D. Abbott, William Bayard Hale, William George Jordan, George Sylvester Viereck, and Charles Barzillai Spahr (1903–04).

Current Literature was intended initially "to deal with current literature in an eclectic way." As the publication developed over time, it began to resemble an illustrated news magazine in form and content, a process that was accelerated in March 1903 when the publication absorbed a younger competing publication, the Boston-based Current History. This gradual transition from popular literary magazine to illustrated news monthly was consummated in 1913 with a name change to Current Opinion.

With the exception of a single skipped issue, Current Opinion remained in continuous monthly publication until its termination in April 1925, when the publication was absorbed by its rival, The Literary Digest.
