= Charles B. Stover =

American social activist (1861–1929)

Charles Bunstein Stover
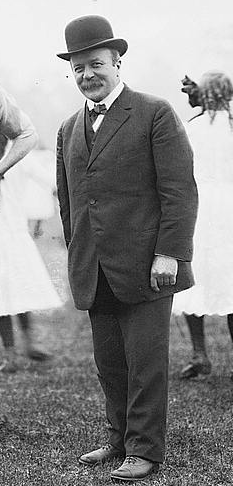
- Stover in 1913

Parks Commissioner for New York City

Personal details
- Born: July 14, 1861 Riegelsville, Pennsylvania
- Died: April 25, 1929 (aged 67) University Settlement House; New York City
- Education: Lafayette College

Charles Bunstein Stover (July 14, 1861 – April 25, 1929) was a social activist and the Parks Commissioner for New York City from 1910 to 1913.

== Biography ==
Stover was born in Riegelsville, Pennsylvania, on July 14, 1861. He attended Lafayette College and graduated in 1881. He studied to become a Presbyterian minister at the Union Theological Seminary and graduated in 1884. He also took classes at the University of Berlin, before moving to Manhattan's Lower East Side.

In 1886, Stover founded the Neighborhood Guild on Forsyth Street, the first settlement house in the United States. In 1898, he and Lillian Wald, director of the nearby Henry Street Settlement, founded the Outdoor Recreation League (ORL), whose mission was to provide play spaces and organize games for the children of the densely populated Lower East Side. The ORL opened nine privately sponsored playgrounds and advocated that the City itself build and operate playgrounds. In 1902 the City assumed the operation of the ORL playgrounds, and in 1903 opened what is presumed to be the first municipally built playground in the nation, Seward Park in Manhattan's Lower East Side; the ORL had opened an outdoor gymnasium there in May 1899, on city-owned land.

In January 1910, Stover was named parks commissioner for Manhattan by New York City's newly elected mayor, William Jay Gaynor. Stover's tenure was controversial; in July 1911 The New York Times reported that he was being asked to hand in his resignation. This was due to his firing Samuel Parsons, the department's landscape architect. Parsons had many well-placed friends in the city, who spread negative stories about Stover in the newspapers. Stover did not resign and was not fired; in August 1911 he announced major plans were underway for Central Park and Riverside Drive Park. In April 1913 Stover said "I do not believe in the policy that the parks are merely places people to walk through and look at the trees and gaze at the landscape from a distance, nor do I believe that any one should be permitted to destroy anything, but I take the position that certain parks of the asphalt and the lawns should be open most liberally to the young people for amusement, proper athletics, and recreation, under proper circumstances."

== Disappearance and reappearance ==
In October 1913, Stover told his staff and coworkers that he was going out for lunch then he disappeared. In mid-November he was erroneously thought to have died in Delaware when a body resembling him was found. A week later, he was seen in Washington, D.C., by a former city official. In late November, a nationwide search began, which included sending a short film clip to 10,000 moving-picture places across the United States. Shortly thereafter, Stover mailed his letter of resignation from Cincinnati, and Ardolph Loges Kline, the Mayor of New York City, replaced Stover with Louis F. La Roche, Stover's deputy.

Stover eventually admitted that he had disappeared on purpose because the newspaper attacks from Parsons' allies had driven him to despair. On January 28, 1914, Stover returned to the University Settlement House.

== Later life and death ==
Stover spent the rest of his life developing a summer camp at Beacon, New York, operated by the University Settlement House. He died at the University Settlement House on April 24, 1929, at the age of 67, leaving an estate valued at only $500.

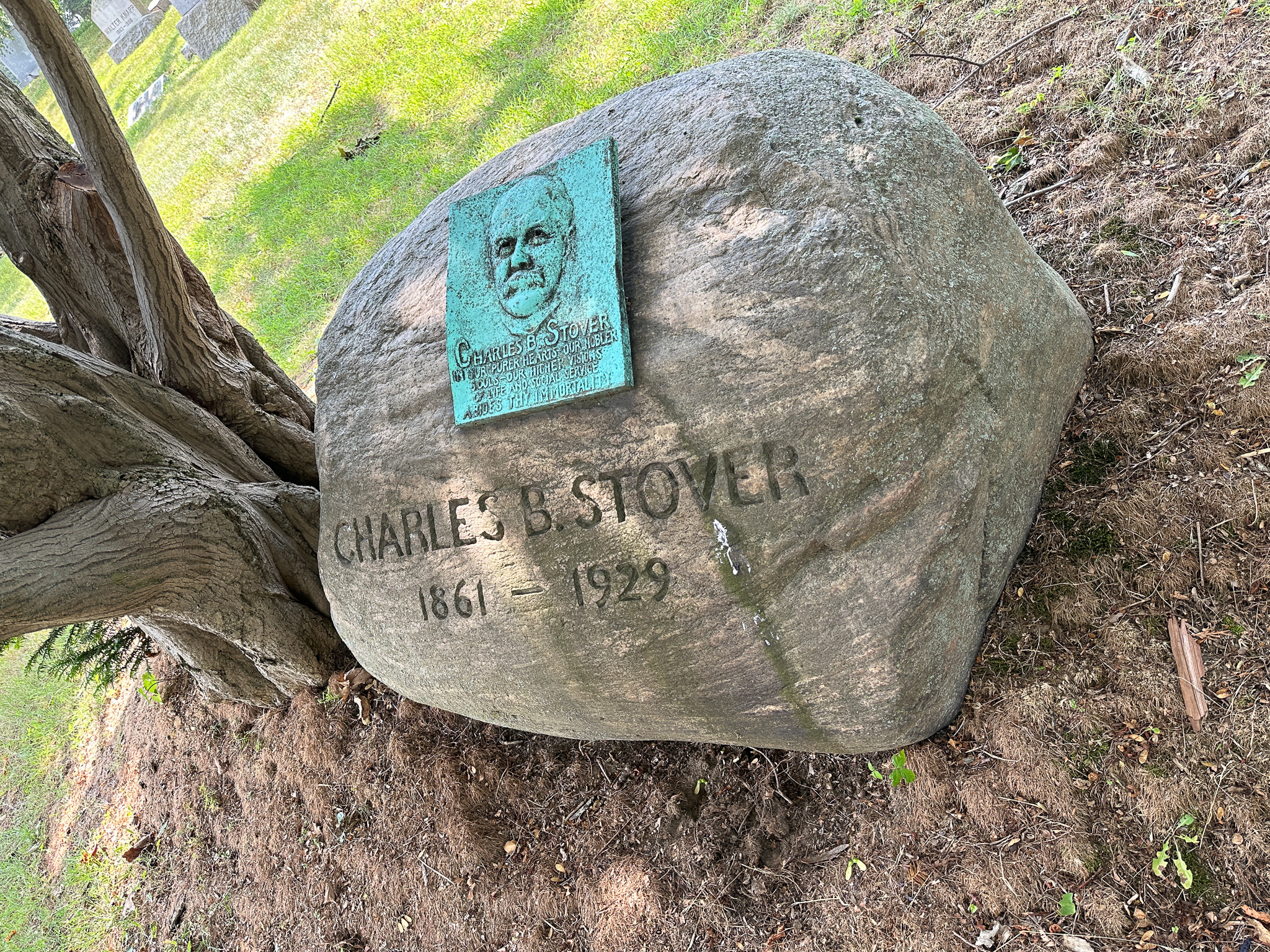
Charles B. Stover Grave Memorial

== Legacy ==
The granite Stover Memorial Bench overlooking Central Park's Shakespeare Garden, to commemorate Stover, was approved in 1935 by Robert Moses and installed in 1936. It is a whispering gallery. Under Stover's name is inscribed Founder of Outdoor Playgrounds.

Charles B. Stover Memorial Bench

== See also ==
- List of solved missing person cases (pre-1950)
