= Charles Barzillai Spahr =

Charles Barzillai Spahr (July 20, 1860 – August 30, 1904) was an American political economist, author, newspaper publisher and editor. He was also prominently identified with University Settlement work. He numbered among his intimate friends such people as Carl Schurz, Ernest Howard Crosby, and Henry George.

== Early life and education ==
Spahr was born in Columbus, Ohio, July 20, 1860. He was the son of the Rev. Barzillai Nelson, and Elizabeth (Tallman) Spahr. He was the grandson of Gideon and Phoebe (Hegler) Spahr, and of George and Jane (Douglas) Tallman, and a descendant of Spahr, who was born in Basel, Switzerland.

Spahr was graduated from Amherst College, in 1881. He studied at Leipzig, 1884–85. The honorary degree of Ph.D. was conferred upon him by the School of Political Science, Columbia University, New York City, in 1886.

== Career ==
In 1886, with Stanton Coit, Spahr co-founded the University Settlement New York on the Lower East Side of New York City. In the same year, he became associate editor of The Outlook, and continued to be associated with the periodical until February 1904.

Spahr was one of the primary workers in the formation of the American League, which organization was strongly opposed to imperialism. he was one of the chief movers against the imperialistic policy of the U.S., and fought hard against the acquisition of the Philippines by the U.S. government.

In 1903, he purchased Current Literature, a successful magazine with offices on West 26th Street in New York City. He found in this undertaking that his duties, although lucrative, were onerous, and he gave way to the worry of the business p art of the enterprise, a phase of the publication trade with which he had had no previous experience.

He was the author of: Present Distribution of Wealth (1896); America's Working People (1900), and essays on "The Taxation of Labor"; "Single Tax", and "Giffeus Case against Bimetallism".

== Personal life ==
On July 5, 1892, he married Jean Gurney, daughter of Lambert and Mary (Burchard) Fine, of Princeton, New Jersey. They had five daughters: Margaret (b. 1893; Smith 1914), Elizabeth Fine (b. 1894), Mary Burchard (b. 1896), Jean Gurney (b. 1899), and Helen Thayer (b. 1902).

== Death ==
Spahr either fell or jumped overboard from the steamer Prince Albert midway between Ostend and Dover on August 30, 1904. He had been suffering from a complication of severe indigestion, and the nervous strain of overwork in his editorial duties; he was traveling for his health.

== Selected works ==
- Present Distribution of Wealth (1896)
- America's Working People (1900)

=== Essays ===
- "The Taxation of Labor"
- "Single Tax"
- "Giffeus Case against Bimetallism"
