= Current Opinion (Current Drugs) =

Current Opinion is a series of medical journals published by Current Drugs from 1998 to 2010. Current Drugs was acquired by Thomson Corporation in 2004.

Journals in the series included:

- Current Opinion in Drug Discovery & Development (ISSN 1367-6733)
- Current Opinion in Investigational Drugs (ISSN 0967-8298), established in 1992 continued as Expert Opinion on Investigational Drugs in 1994
- Current Opinion in Investigational Drugs (ISSN 1472-4472), established in 2000, formed by the merger of
  - Current Opinion in Anti-infective Investigational Drugs (ISSN 1464-8458)
  - Current Opinion in Anti-inflammatory & Immunomodulatry Investigation Drugs (ISSN 1464-8474)
  - Current Opinion in Cardiovascular, Pulmonary and Renal Investigational Drugs (ISSN 1464-8482)
  - Current Opinion in Central & Peripheral Nervous System Investigational Drugs (ISSN 1464-844X)
  - Current Opinion in Oncologic, Endocrine & Metabolic Investigational Drugs (ISSN 1464-8466)
- Current Opinion in Molecular Therapeutics (ISSN 1464-8431)
