= Caroline Frances Hamilton =

American physician

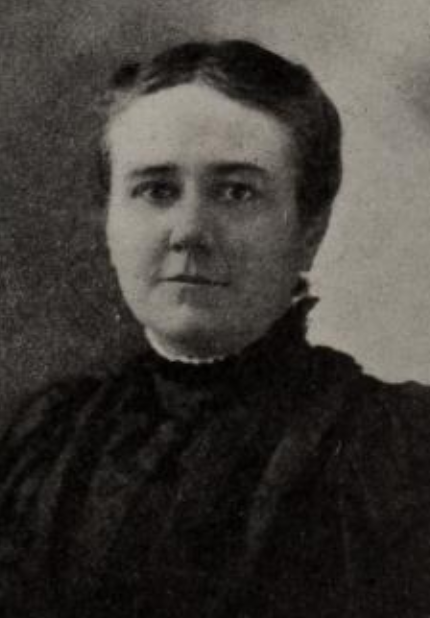
- Caroline Frances Hamilton, from an 1899 publication
- Born: September 18, 1861; West Hartford, Connecticut, U.S.
- Died: September 10, 1944 (aged 82); White Plains, New York, U.S.
- Occupations: Physician, medical missionary

Caroline Frances Hamilton (September 18, 1861 – September 10, 1944) was an American physician and medical missionary based in Gaziantep, Turkey, from 1892 to 1932.

== Early life and education ==
Hamilton was born in West Hartford, Connecticut, the daughter of Benedict Wood Hamilton and Electa Sophia Millard Hamilton. She graduated from Smith College in 1885. She earned her medical degree in 1888, at the Woman's Medical College of the New York Infirmary for Women and Children.

== Career ==
Hamilton was a co-founder and resident physician of the Rivington Street Settlement in New York.

Hamilton and Mary Pierson Eddy were the first two Western women licensed to practice medicine by the Sultan of Turkey, in 1893. She was a medical missionary in Turkey, at a mission station maintained by the American Board of Commissioners for Foreign Missions. She was associated with Azariah Smith Memorial Hospital in Gaziantep (Aintab). She traveled often on horseback, staying in villages to treat women and refugees who had limited access to obstetric and gynecological care, and training local healthcare workers. She wrote letters home, describing atrocities and political upheaval. She spent some time during World War I on house arrest, forbidden to practice. "In all of these wearying tasks, her hearty fellowship, and her power of imparting to fainting hearts her own courage and good cheer make the doctor in a peculiar sense a trusted friend," commented the Smith College magazine in 1908.

Hamilton attended the second interdenominational Medical Missionary Conference in Battle Creek, Michigan, in 1910. In 1898 and 1919 she attended the annual meetings of the Women's Board of Missions, in New England. During furloughs and after she retired from the mission field, she spoke about her experiences before women's clubs and church groups in New England.

== Publications ==
- "At the Hospital in Aintab" (1899)

== Personal life ==
Hamilton died in 1944, at the age of 82, in White Plains, New York.
