= University Settlement Society of New York =

- U.S. National Register of Historic Places
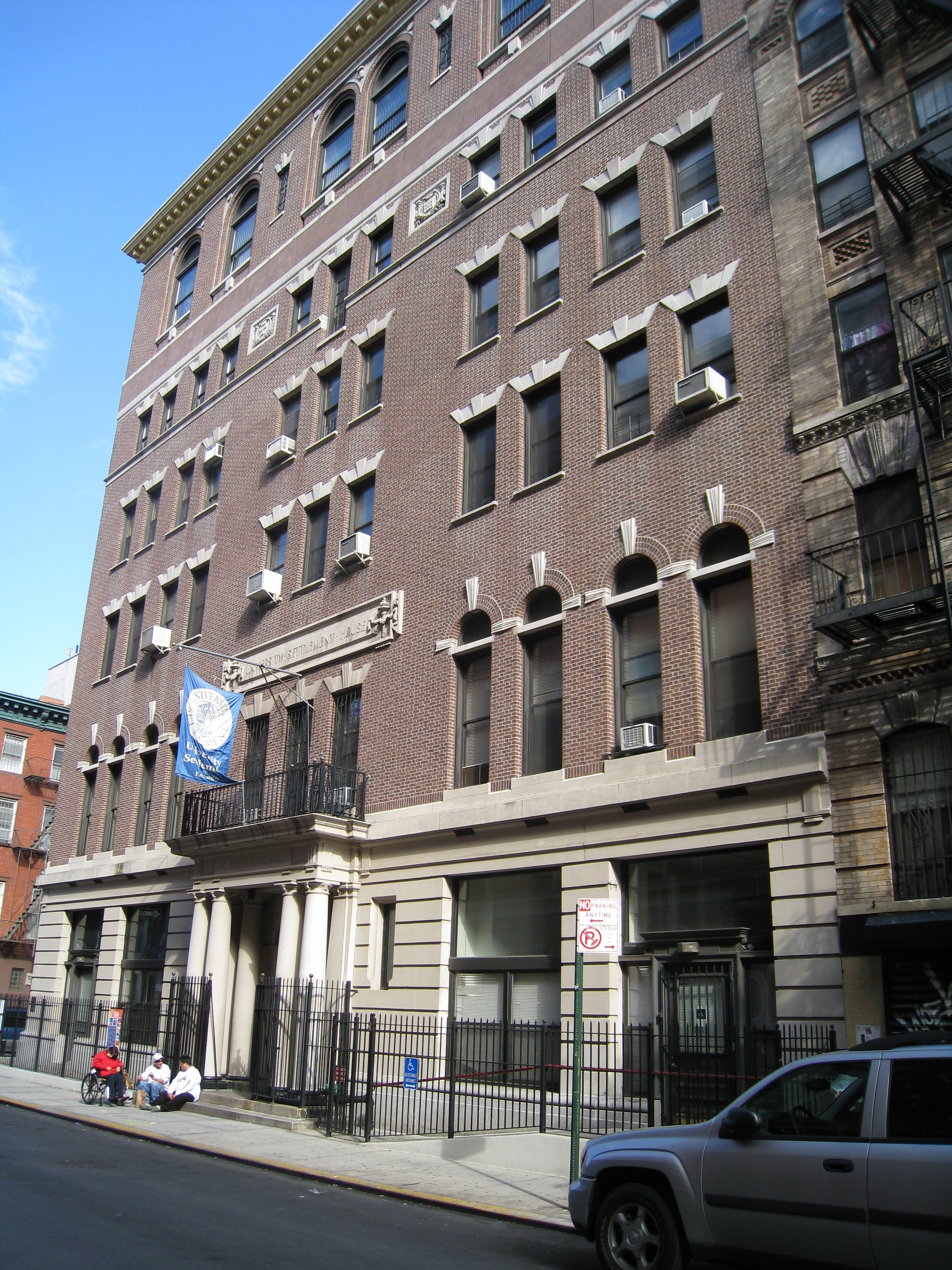
- University Settlement Society of New York

- Location within Lower Manhattan Location within the United States
- Location: 184 Eldridge Street; Manhattan New York City
- Coordinates: 40°43′14″N 73°59′26″W
- Architect: Howells & Stokes
- Architectural style: Classical Revival
- NRHP reference No.: 86002515
- Added to NRHP: September 11, 1986

The University Settlement Society of New York is an American organization which provides educational and social services to immigrants and low-income families, located at 184 Eldridge Street (corner of Eldridge and Rivington Streets) on the Lower East Side of Manhattan in New York City, New York. It provides numerous services for the mostly immigrant population of the neighborhood and has since 1886, when it was established as the first settlement house in the United States.

== History ==
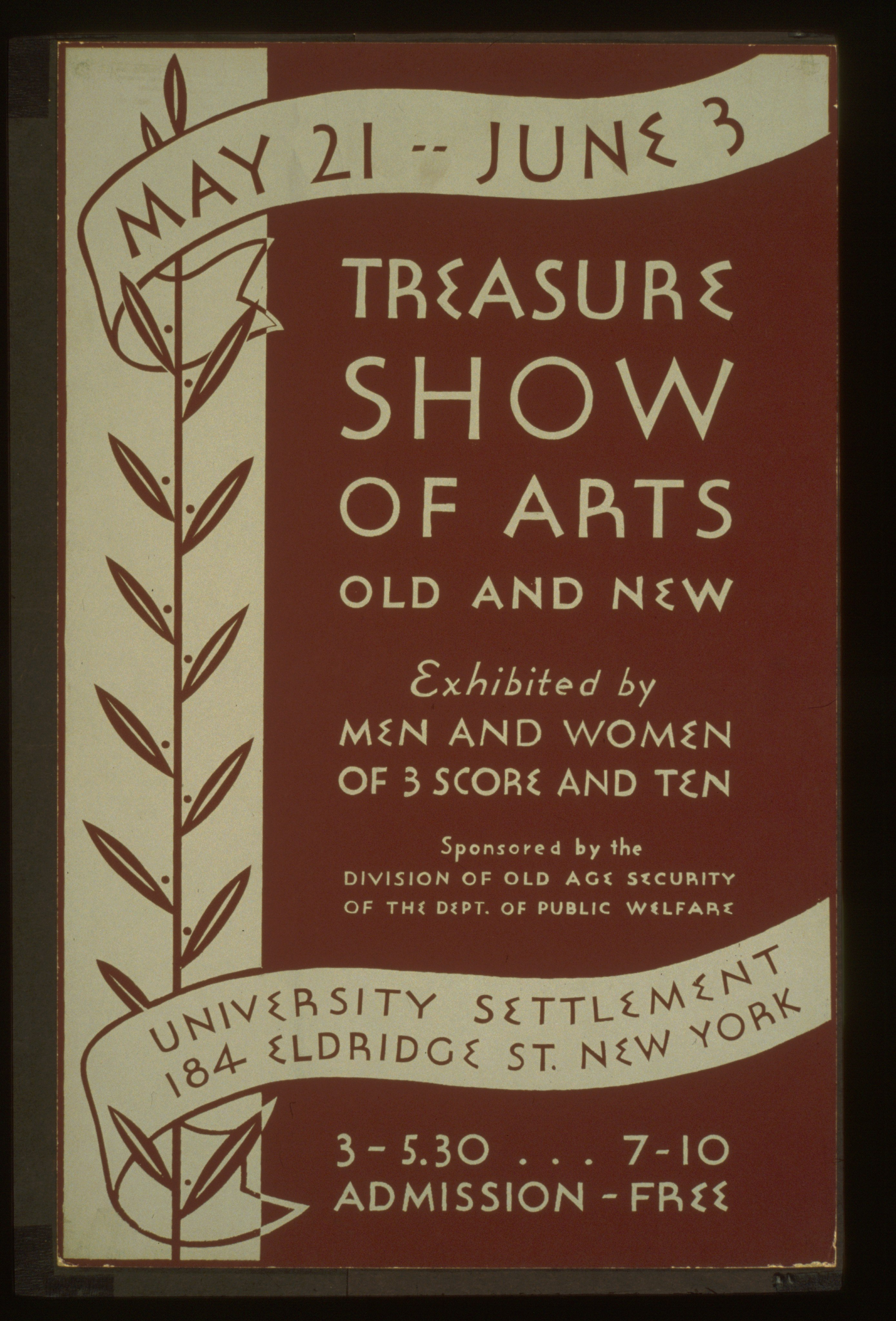
Federal Art Project poster for an exhibition of art at the University Settlement (1937)

University Settlement was founded by Stanton Coit, Charles Bunstein Stover, and Charles Barzillai Spahr, in 1886 as The Neighborhood Guild, in a basement on Forsyth Street.

Historically, the settlement house, much like other settlement houses like Hull House (in Chicago, Illinois) and the Henry Street Settlement (also on the Lower East Side), served as a homes for hundreds of thousands of immigrants who arrived in the United States in the late-19th and early-20th century. They provided courses for new immigrants on everything from politics to the English language to basketball. The University Settlement House also included a library, kindergarten and the first public baths. These settlements were also loci of Progressive Era reform.

When founded, the resident workers at the University Settlement were all male and recent graduates of colleges. Several of these men were writers in addition to settlement house workers and used their writing as social protest and a means of reform. Residents between 1900 and 1907 included socialist writer William English Walling, a founder of the National Association for the Advancement of Colored People; Pulitzer Prize-winner Ernest Poole; Howard Brubaker, who later became a columnist for The New Yorker; writer Arthur Bullard; journalist Hamilton Holt; and author Walter Weyl, a founding editor of The New Republic. Their interest in reform led to several articles and books on the housing and employment situation of workers on the Lower East Side, particularly women and children.

One issue that captured the imagination of many of the University Settlement writers was revolution in Russia. Many of the immigrants they met on the Lower East Side were Jews from the Russian Empire who were typically severely repressed under Nicholas II of Russia. Through their interaction with these immigrants several of the residents became vocal advocates of reform in Russia. During 1905 and 1906, Poole, Walling and Bullard traveled to Russia to cover the abortive 1905 Russian Revolution. They established contacts and helped establish a connection between radical writers in the U.S. and Russian revolutionaries.

During his administration, U.S. President Franklin D. Roosevelt described University Settlement as "a landmark in the social history of the nation."

== Legacy ==
University Settlement continues to provide support services to residents of the Lower East Side, and now offers programs in 31 locations across Manhattan and Brooklyn. Programs serve New Yorkers of all ages and include child care, pre-school, housing assistance, mental health services, college and career preparation, crisis intervention, activities for seniors, arts events, English classes, after-school programs and summer camps.

== Notable alumni and staff ==
- Howard Brubaker – columnist, The New Yorker
- Nicholas Murray Butler – Nobel Peace Prize recipient
- Andrew Carnegie – industrialist and businessman
- George Gershwin – musician
- Ira Gershwin – musician
- Joseph Benson Gilder – editor, The New York Times Review of Books
- Samuel Halpert – artist
- Hamilton Holt – journalist
- Henry Holt – publisher
- Seth Low – Mayor of New York City
- Pauline Arnoux MacArthur – clubwoman, suffragist, librettist
- Clara Pasvolsky – concert singer
- Gifford Pinchot – Governor of Pennsylvania
- Ernest Poole – Pulitzer Prize winner
- Peter Riegert – actor
- Eleanor Roosevelt
- Elihu Root – Nobel Peace Prize recipient
- Jean Toomer - Author, "Cane"
- Carl Schurz – US Senator and Cabinet member
- Jacob Schiff – banker and philanthropist
- Barney Sedran – Basketball Hall of Famer
- Charles Bunstein Stover – New York City Parks Commissioner
- Mary van Kleeck, social feminist
- William English Walling – founder, National Association for the Advancement of Colored People
- Walter Weyl – author; founding editor, The New Republic
- Jacob Javits – American Lawyer, Politician
- Abraham Beame – Mayor of New York City

== See also ==
- New York Association for New Americans
- Settlement and community houses in the United States
