= Griffith R. Harsh IV and Margaret C Whitman Charitable Foundation =

American foundation

The Griffith R. Harsh IV and Margaret C Whitman Charitable Foundation
- Founded: 2006
- Founder: Meg Whitman, Griffith R. Harsh
- Type: Private foundation
- Location: Saratoga Springs, New York
- Key people: Trustees Meg Whitman, Griffith R. Harsh
- Ayco Company, L.P., a Goldman Sachs Company, is the administrator

The Griffith R. Harsh IV and Margaret C Whitman Charitable Foundation are a Saratoga Springs, New York private foundation managed by Griffith R. Harsh and Meg Whitman. The Telluride, CO-based couple, Whitman, the former eBay CEO, and her husband, a Stanford neurosurgeon, formed the foundation by donating 300,000 shares of eBay stock in the last weeks of 2006. In 2007, the first operational year, the foundation made charitable contributions totaling US$125,000 with $100,000 going to the Environmental Defense Fund (EDF), assets for the same time period were reported as US$48 million. The foundation also invested US$4 million in offshore hedge funds, $3 million in Cayman Island and $1 million in Ireland. Tax and foundation experts say young foundations often give very little away in "their infancy", but the foundation will face penalties if it doesn't give away "five percent of the average annual assets" during 2008.

The foundation became a point of scrutiny during the 2010 California gubernatorial election, especially during the Republican primary when Whitman's campaign was presenting itself as conservative on various issues and her foundation's donations were shown to be in tension with her stated positions. Ultimately she became the Republican candidate for the gubernatorial election. The foundation was also brought up in the governor debates when she started the foundation "supports higher education and health care" when asked what higher good she was doing with her wealth.

== Organization ==
The couple is the trustees and the foundation is administered by Ayco Company, L.P., a Goldman Sachs company. Whitman was "paid an estimated $475,000 as a member of the board" and Goldman Sachs has been tied to controversies around the subprime mortgage crisis and was sued by the Securities and Exchange Commission.

== 2008 ==
For the foundation's second year they lost about $27 million, mostly in eBay stock. The biggest donation of 2008, $1.15 million, went to a campaign to protect 572 acres of meadows and wetlands outside the resort town Telluride, Colorado, where she and her husband own a condo, valued at $4.8 million, a dude ranch valued at $18 million and 847 acres surrounding a mountain lake that they purchased for $16 million in 2009. The campaign was to prevent the land from being developed into condos and a golf course.

The couple donated an additional 500,000 shares of eBay stock to the foundation, which they valued at the time at more than $8.8 million.

== 2010 California gubernatorial election ==
Whitman became the Republican candidate in the 2010 California gubernatorial election. And aspects of her foundation were scrutinized in relation to where she donated monies and how they were held in tension to her "tightly scripted" campaign.

The foundation donated $300,000 to the Environmental Defense Fund's (EDF), an environmental advocacy group, Center for Rivers and Deltas which is "at odds" with Whitman over water policy. The EDF supports water conservation and preservation of the Sacramento-San Joaquin Delta, an environmentally endangered waterway. EDF also supports court decisions that protect endangered species such as the Delta smelt. Whitman during the campaign has given answers "couched in vague language that sounds good" and on the Delta, the issue has stated it is a "humanitarian crisis" that requires coming down on the side of people." She was criticized as writing "huge checks to opponents of California farmers."

"[A]ctions that would draw little notice in the private sector can appear differently when a wealthy individual wades into politics." Barbara O'Connor, director of the Institute for the Study of Politics and Media at California State University-Sacramento, called the documents a "window into the candidates' value systems", she noted if there is a change in that value system as someone moves from business person to politician, "then it's reasonable to question the shift" leading to calls to release their personal tax returns." Her opponent in the race for governor had done so many months prior and calls for her to release her taxes have been made since the beginning of 2010.

The Caymans investments have been a target of politicians in recent years for apparent tax avoidance and tax evasion issues as taxation of private equity and hedge funds vary considerably from country to country. In March 2009 U.S. Senator Carl Levin, (D-Michigan), and Representative Lloyd Doggett, (D-Texas), introduced the "Stop Tax Haven Abuse Act" to "restrict the use of offshore tax havens and abusive tax shelters" in places "such as the Caymans".

As part of the campaign, Whitman was asked if she would join the Billionaire's Pledge started by Microsoft Corp. co-founder Bill Gates and multibillionaire investor Warren Buffett. The pledge is for the "world's wealthiest people to donate at least 50% of their fortunes to charities". Whitman, who has a net worth of $1.4 billion and was 326th on Forbes' list of the 400 richest Americans in 2009, stated she said she had donated to "education and the environment and other areas," and would "continue to build our foundation".

== See also ==
- Forbes list of billionaires
- List of female billionaires
