= Griffith R. Harsh =

American neurosurgeon

- Born: Griffith Rutherford Harsh IV
- Education: Harvard University (AB, MD); New College, Oxford (MA); Boston University (MBA)
- Occupation: Neurosurgeon
- Spouse: Meg Whitman (m. 1980)
- Children: 2

Griffith Rutherford Harsh IV is an American neurosurgeon, and chair of neurosurgery at the University of New Mexico.

== Early life and education ==
Dr. Harsh attended Indian Springs School in Alabama, Harvard College, Oxford University, and Harvard Medical School. His father, Griffith R. Harsh III, former Chair of the Division of Neurological Surgery at the University of Alabama, Birmingham and Chairman of the American Board of Neurological Surgery.

== Career ==
Dr. Harsh completed his residency and fellowship training in neurological surgery at the University of California, San Francisco (UCSF). His clinical research has involved the development and testing of emerging techniques and technologies, such as skull base surgery, intraoperative imaging, proton beam radiation, radiosurgery, and gene therapy.

== Personal life ==
Harsh is married to Meg Whitman, the former CEO of eBay, former CEO of Hewlett Packard Enterprise, and the 2010 Republican nominee for governor of California.
