= 2010 California gubernatorial election =

- November 2, 2010
- Turnout: 59.59% ▲26.82pp
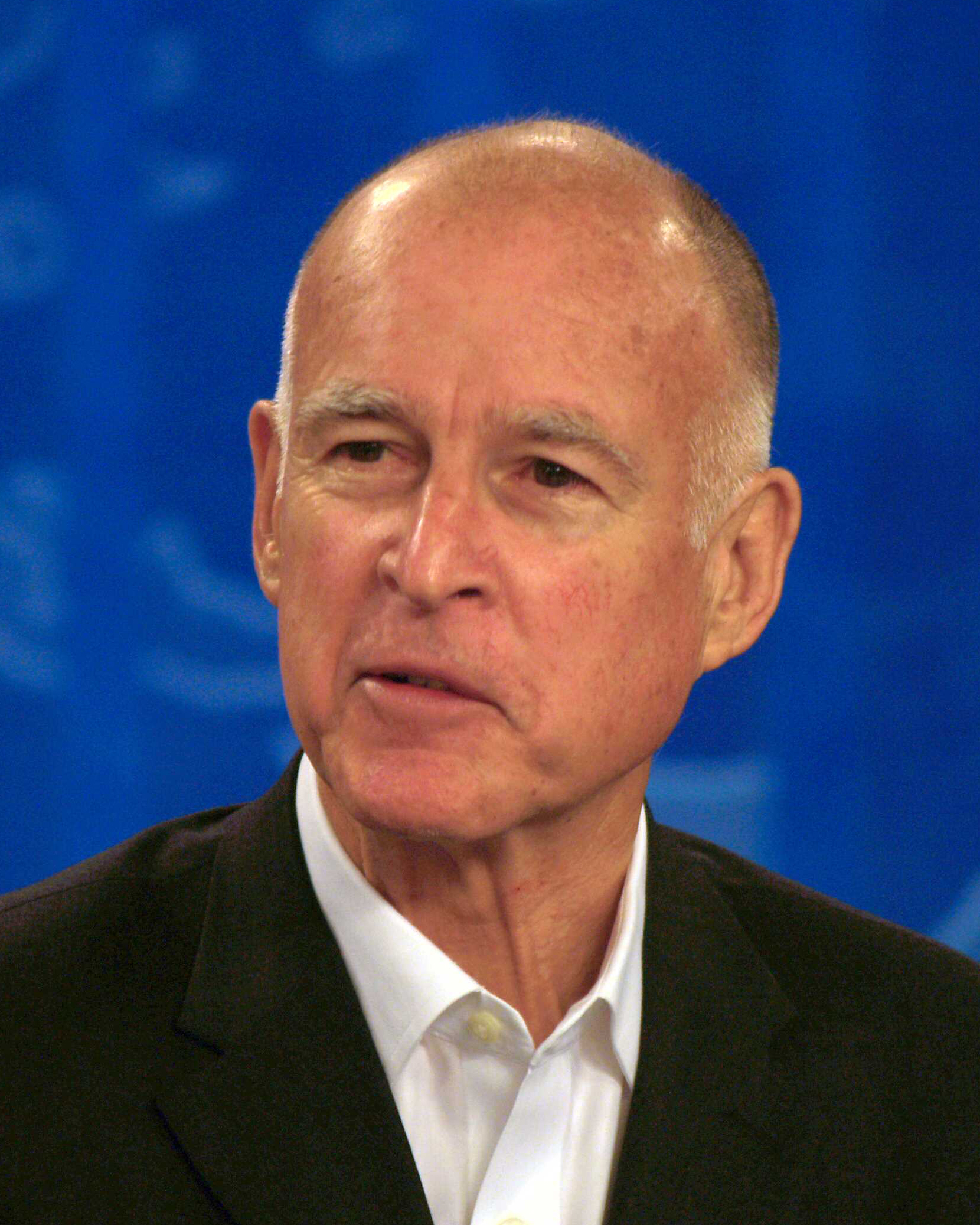

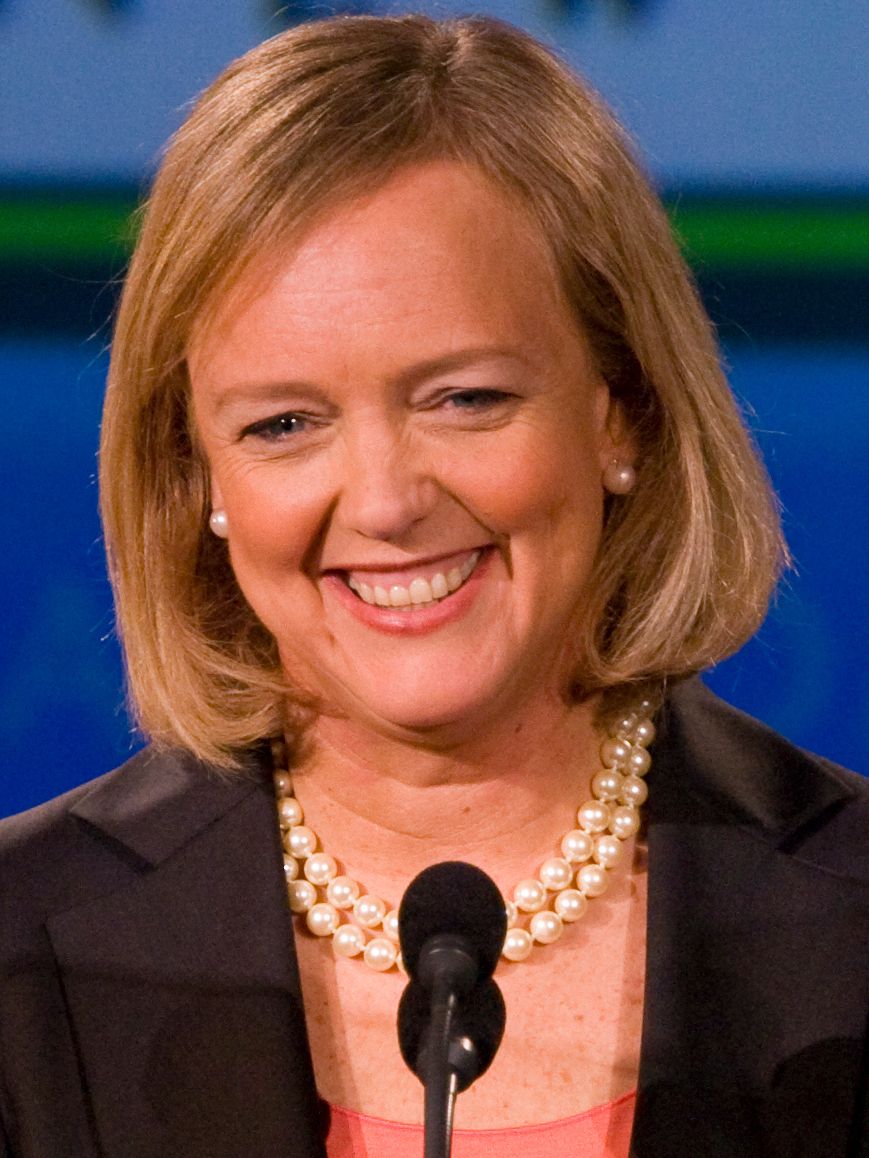
Nominee	Jerry Brown	Meg Whitman
Party	Democratic	Republican
Popular vote	5,428,149	4,127,391
Percentage	53.77%	40.88%
- Brown: 40–50% 50–60% 60–70% 70–80% 80–90% Whitman: 40–50% 50–60% 60–70%
Governor before election
Arnold Schwarzenegger
Republican
Elected Governor
Jerry Brown
Democratic

The 2010 California gubernatorial election was held November 2, 2010, to elect the governor of California. The primary elections were held on June 8, 2010. Because constitutional office holders in California have been prohibited from serving more than two terms in the same office since November 6, 1990, incumbent Republican Arnold Schwarzenegger was ineligible to run for re-election due to term limits. Former Governor Jerry Brown, who served as the 34th governor of California from 1975 to 1983, to whom the term limits did not apply due to a grandfather clause, defeated Meg Whitman in the general election and was sworn into office on January 3, 2011. As of 2026, this remains the most recent time the governor's office in California has changed partisan control.

== Primary election ==
=== Republican Party ===
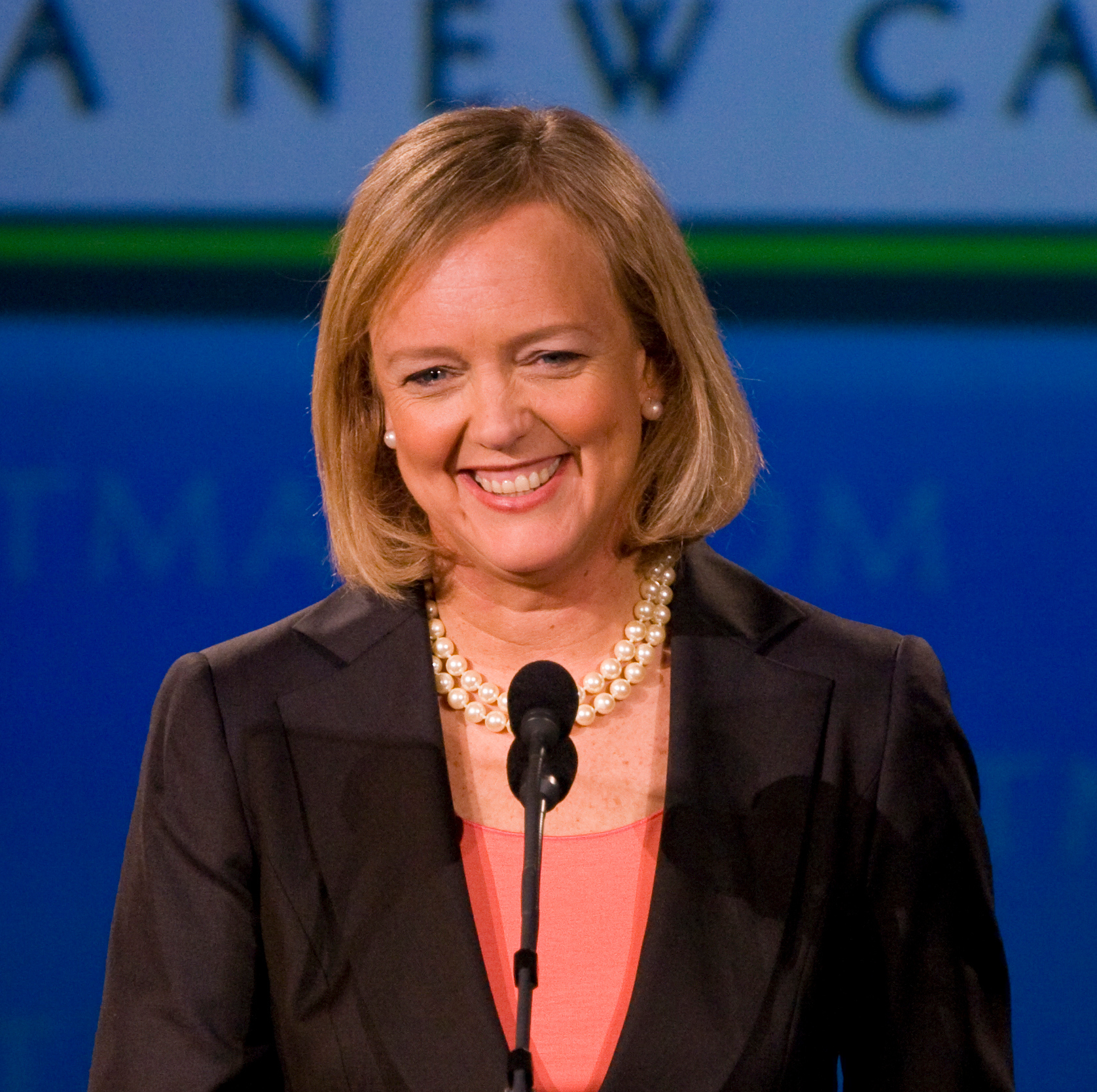
Republican nominee Meg Whitman campaigning

==== Candidates ====
- Bill Chambers, railroad switchman
- Douglas Hughes, retired business owner
- Ken Miller, former broadcast manager
- Steven Mozena (write-in candidate)
- Lawrence Naritelli, accountant and controller
- Robert Newman, psychologist and farmer
- Steve Poizner, businessman and then-California Insurance Commissioner
- David Tully-Smith, primary care physician
- Meg Whitman, businesswoman, former CEO of eBay

==== Polling ====
Poll source	Date(s) administered	Tom Campbell*	Meg Whitman	Steve Poizner	Peter Foy*
Capitol Weekly/Probolsky	January 5–22, 2009	15%	14%	4%	1%
The Field Poll	February 20 – March 1, 2009	18%	21%	7%	—
Capitol Weekly/Probolsky	May 25, 2009	13%	10%	8%	1%
Research 2000	August 9, 2009	19%	24%	9%	—
The Field Poll	September 18 – October 5, 2009	20%	22%	9%	—
USC/Los Angeles Times	October 27 – November 3, 2009	27%	35%	10%	—
Public Policy Institute of California	December 16, 2009	12%	32%	8%	—
The Field Poll	January 5–17, 2010	—	45%	17%	—
The Field Poll	January 5–17, 2010	22%	36%	9%	—
Public Policy Institute of California	January 27, 2010	—	41%	11%	—
Research 2000	March 10, 2010	—	52%	19%	—
The Field Poll	March 17, 2010	—	63%	14%	—
Public Policy Institute of California	March 24, 2010	—	61%	11%	—
USC/Los Angeles Times	March 23–30, 2010	—	60%	20%	—
Survey USA	April 19–21, 2010	—	49%	27%	—
Survey USA	May 6–9, 2010	—	39%	37%	—
Research 2000	May 17–19, 2010	—	46%	36%	—
Public Policy Institute of California	May 19, 2010	—	38%	29%	—
Public Policy Polling	May 21–23, 2010	—	51%	26%	—
USC/Los Angeles Times	May 19–26, 2010	—	53%	29%	—
Survey USA	June 3–6, 2010	—	59%	30%	—

==== Results ====
Results by county: Whitman—70–80% Whitman—60–70% Whitman—50–60%

Republican primary results
Party	Candidate	Votes	%
Republican	Meg Whitman	1,529,534	64.35%
Republican	Steve Poizner	632,940	26.63%
Republican	Lawrence Naritelli	54,202	2.28%
Republican	Robert C. Newman II	38,462	1.62%
Republican	Ken Miller	36,609	1.54%
Republican	Bill Chambers	34,243	1.44%
Republican	Douglas R. Hughes	26,085	1.10%
Republican	David Tully-Smith	24,978	1.05%
Republican	Steven Paul Mozena (write-in)	26	0.00%
Total votes		2,377,079	100.00%

=== Democratic party ===
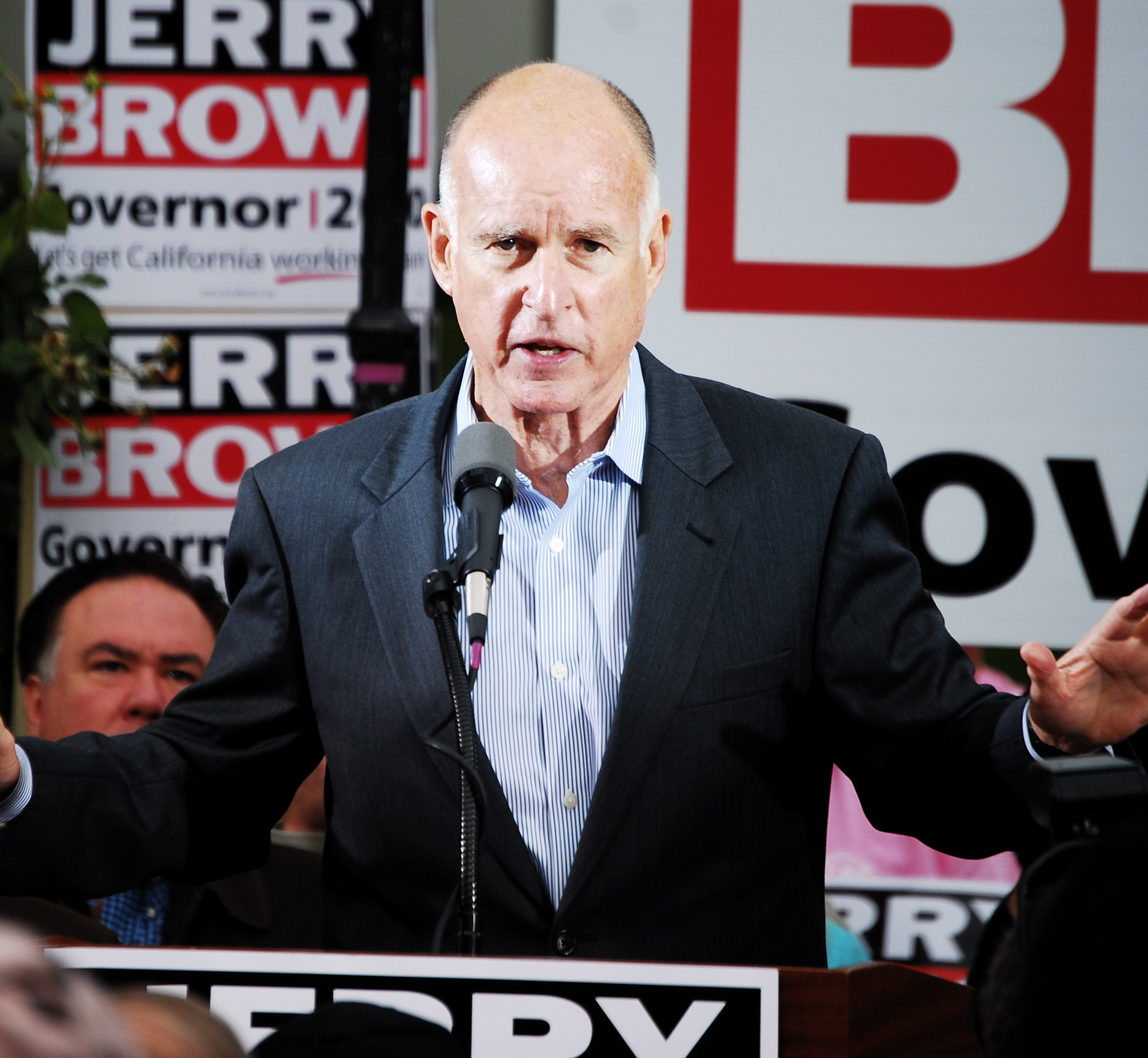
Democratic nominee Jerry Brown campaigning

==== Candidates ====
===== Declared =====
- Richard Aguirre, businessman
- Jerry Brown, incumbent California Attorney General and former Governor of California
- Lowell Darling, independent artist
- Vibert Greene, mechanical engineer and CEO
- Charles Pineda, parole board judge
- Peter Schurman, non-profit organization consultant who dropped out of the race
- Nadia Smalley (write-in candidate)
- Joe Symmon, president of a non-profit organization

===== Withdrew =====
- John Garamendi, incumbent California Lieutenant Governor and former California Insurance Commissioner (ran for U.S. Congress)
- Gavin Newsom, Mayor of San Francisco (ran for Lieutenant Governor)

===== Declined =====
- Dianne Feinstein, U.S. Senator
- Antonio Villaraigosa, Mayor of Los Angeles

==== Polling ====
Poll source	Dates administered	Dianne Feinstein*	Jerry Brown	Antonio Villaraigosa*	Gavin Newsom*	John Garamendi*	Jack O'Connell*	Steve Westly*	Bill Lockyer*
Capitol Weekly/Probolsky	January 22–25, 2009	36%	14%	9%	9%	4%	3%	1%	––
Lake Research Partners	February 17–19, 2009	––	27%	20%	14%	8%	1%	3%	––
The Field Poll	February 20 – March 1, 2009	38%	16%	16%	10%	4%	1%	2%	1%
The Field Poll	February 20 – March 1, 2009	––	26%	22%	16%	8%	2%	2%	2%
Tulchin Poll	April 23, 2009	––	31%	12%	16%	11%	6%	––	––
Capital Weekly	May 25, 2009	––	24%	15%	16%	7%	5%	3%	––
J. Moore	June 20, 2009	––	47%	––	26%	––	––	––	––
Research 2000	June 10–16, 2009	––	29%	––	20%	––	––	––	––
Research 2000	June 10–16, 2009	40%	27%	––	16%	––	––	––	––
The Field Poll	September 18 – October 5, 2009	––	47%	––	27%	––	––	––	––

==== Results ====
Results by county: Brown—>90% Brown—80–90% Brown—70–80% Brown—60–70% Brown—50–60%

Democratic primary results
Party	Candidate	Votes	%
Democratic	Jerry Brown	2,021,189	84.38%
Democratic	Richard Aguirre	95,596	3.99%
Democratic	Charles Pineda	94,669	3.95%
Democratic	Vibert Greene	54,225	2.26%
Democratic	Joe Symmon	54,122	2.26%
Democratic	Lowell Darling	39,930	1.67%
Democratic	Peter Schurman	35,450	1.48%
Democratic	Nadia B. Smalley (write-in)	106	0.00%
Total votes		2,395,287	100.00%

=== American Independent primary ===
==== Candidates ====
- Chelene Nightingale, business owner
- Markham Robinson, owner of a software firm

==== Results ====
American Independent primary results
Party	Candidate	Votes	%
American Independent	Chelene Nightingale	24,000	58.07%
American Independent	Markham Robinson	17,327	41.93%
Total votes		41,327	100.00%

=== Libertarian primary ===
==== Candidates ====
- Jordan Llamas, Doctor of Psychology and Political Science
- Dale Ogden, business consultant and actuary

==== Results ====
Libertarian primary results
Party	Candidate	Votes	%
Libertarian	Dale Ogden	17,477	100.00%
Total votes		17,477	100.00%

=== Green primary ===
==== Candidates ====
- S. Deacon Alexander, student
- Laura Wells, financial systems consultant

==== Results ====
Green primary results
Party	Candidate	Votes	%
Green	Laura Wells	17,548	79.47%
Green	S. Deacon Alexander	4,533	20.53%
Total votes		22,081	100.00%

=== Peace and Freedom primary ===
==== Candidates ====
- Stewart Alexander, political consultant and former vice presidential candidate for Socialist Party USA
- Carlos Alvarez, retail worker
- Mohammad Arif, businessman

==== Results ====
Results by county: Alvarez: 40–50%; 50–60%; 60–70%; 100%; Alexander: 40–50%; 50–60%; 60–70%; 100%; Tie: 30–40%; 50%; No Vote

Peace and Freedom primary results
Party	Candidate	Votes	%
Peace and Freedom	Carlos Alvarez	1,906	45.25%
Peace and Freedom	Stewart Alexander	1,693	40.19%
Peace and Freedom	Mohammad Arif	613	14.54%
Total votes		4,212	100.00%

== General election ==
=== Campaign ===
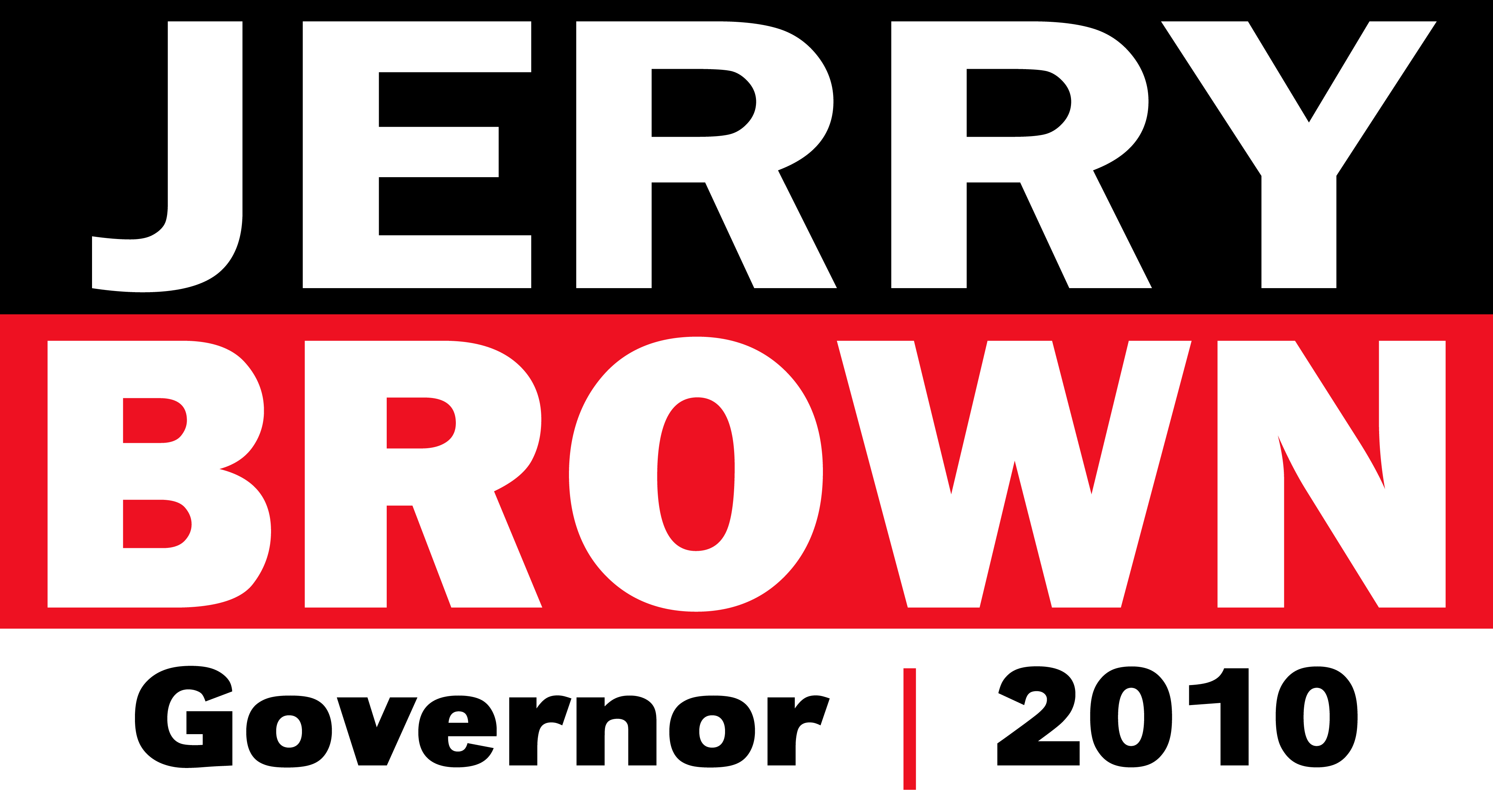
Brown's campaign logo

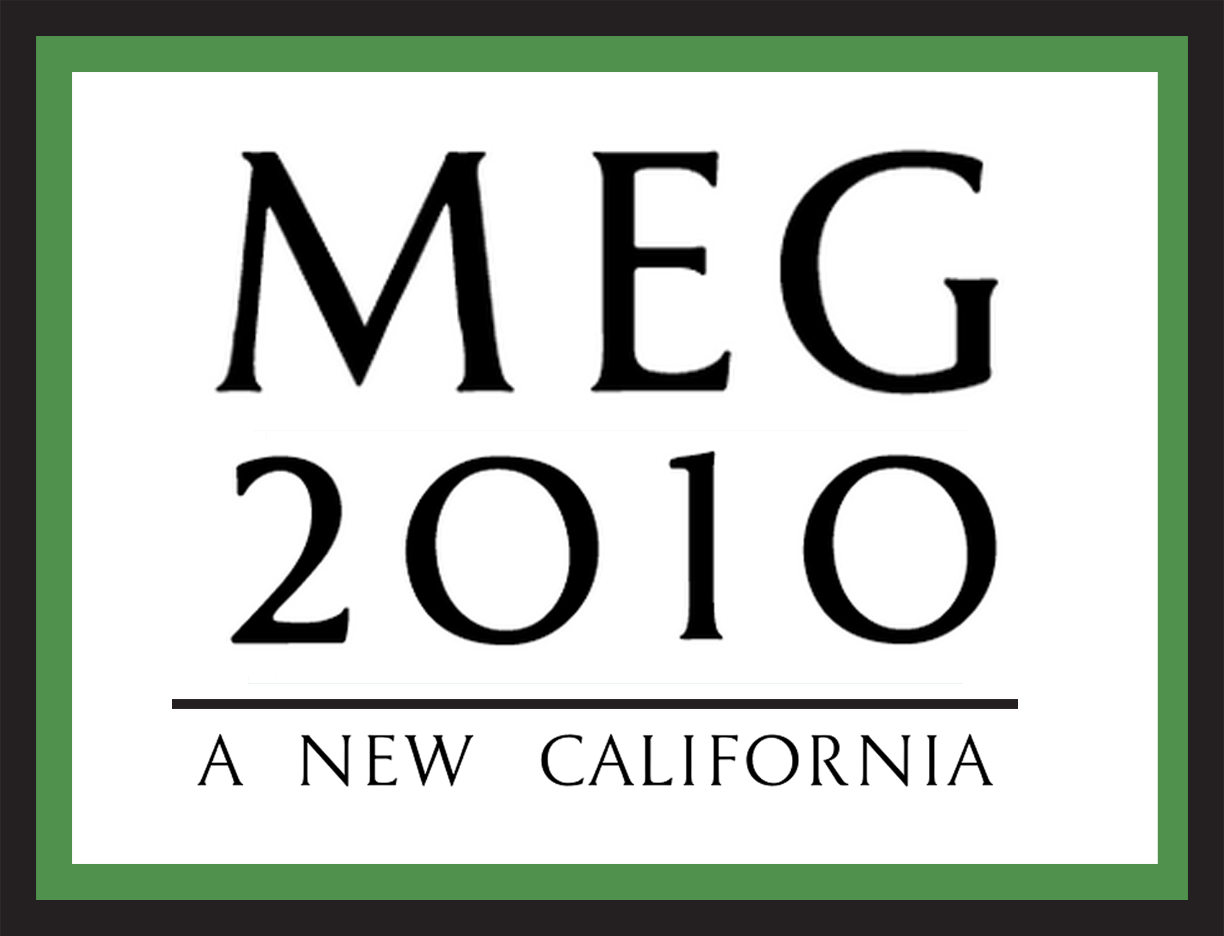
Whitman's campaign logo

Both Whitman and Brown were criticized for negative campaigning during the election. During their final debate at the 2010 Women's Conference a week before the election, moderator Matt Lauer asked both candidates to pull attack ads for the rest of the election, which elicited loud cheers from the audience. Brown agreed and picked one ad each of his and Whitman's that he thought, if Whitman would agree, should be the only ones run, but Whitman, who had been loudly cheered earlier as the prospective first woman governor of the state, was booed when she stated that she would keep "the ads that talk about where Gov. Brown stands on the issues."

The Los Angeles Times reported that nearly $250 million was spent on the Governor's race. At least two spending records were broken during the campaign. Whitman broke personal spending records by spending $140 million of her own money on the campaign, and independent expenditures exceeded $31.7 million, with almost $25 million of that spent in support of Brown.

In an interview with CNN, the reporter opined that Whitman was hurt most during the campaign by a matter involving Nicky Diaz, her former Mexican maid, whom Whitman fired after Diaz asked for help as she was an illegal immigrant.

As of 2024, this is the last time the American Independent Party ran in a California gubernatorial election.

=== Candidates' stances on issues ===
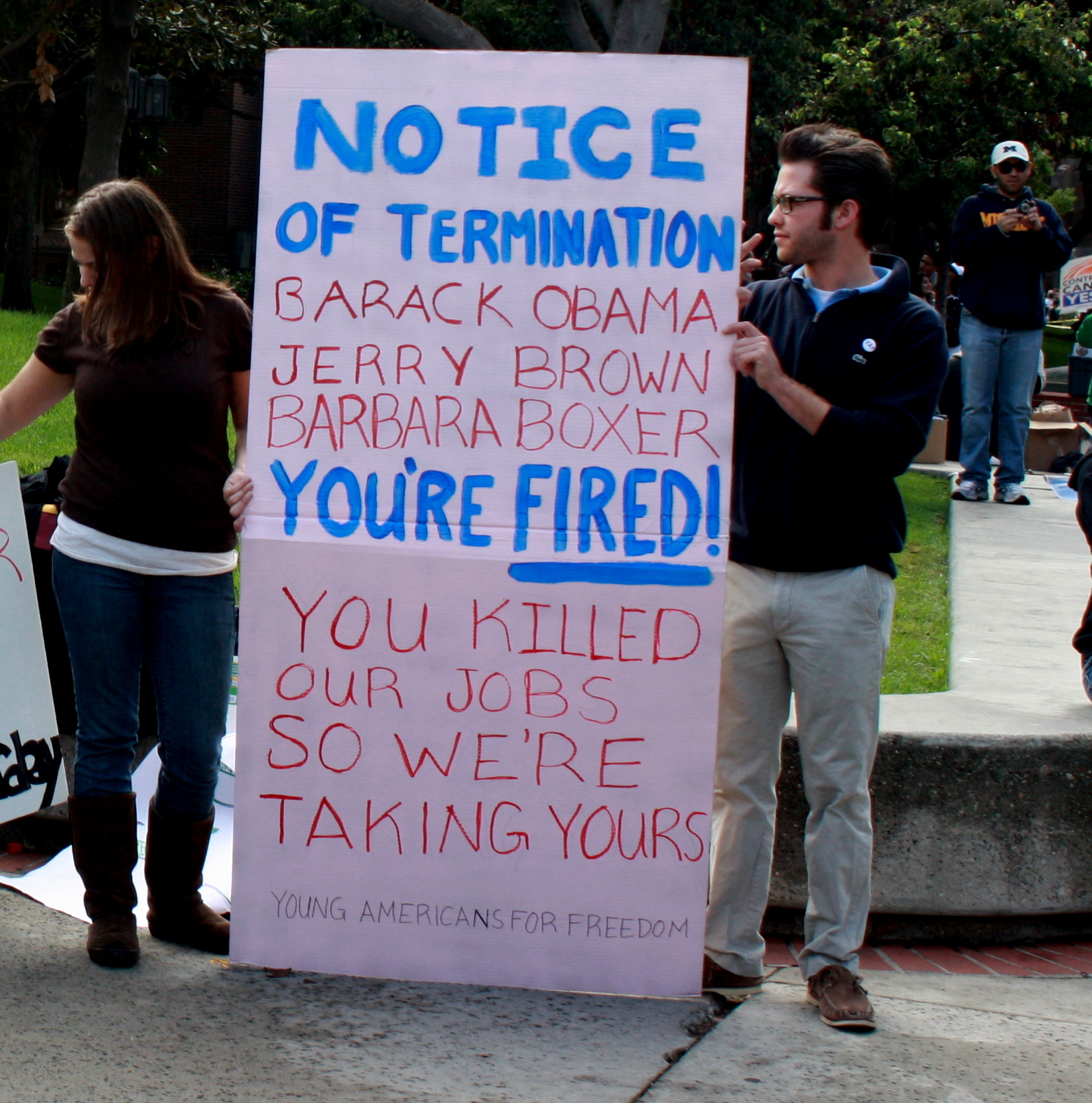
Republican supporter holds a sign criticizing Brown and other Democrats on jobs.

Jobs: Meg Whitman
1. Eliminate small business start-up tax ($800 fee for new business start-ups)
2. Eliminate factory tax
3. Increase R&D tax credit (increase from 15% to 20%)
4. Promote investments in agriculture
5. Eliminate the state tax on capital gains

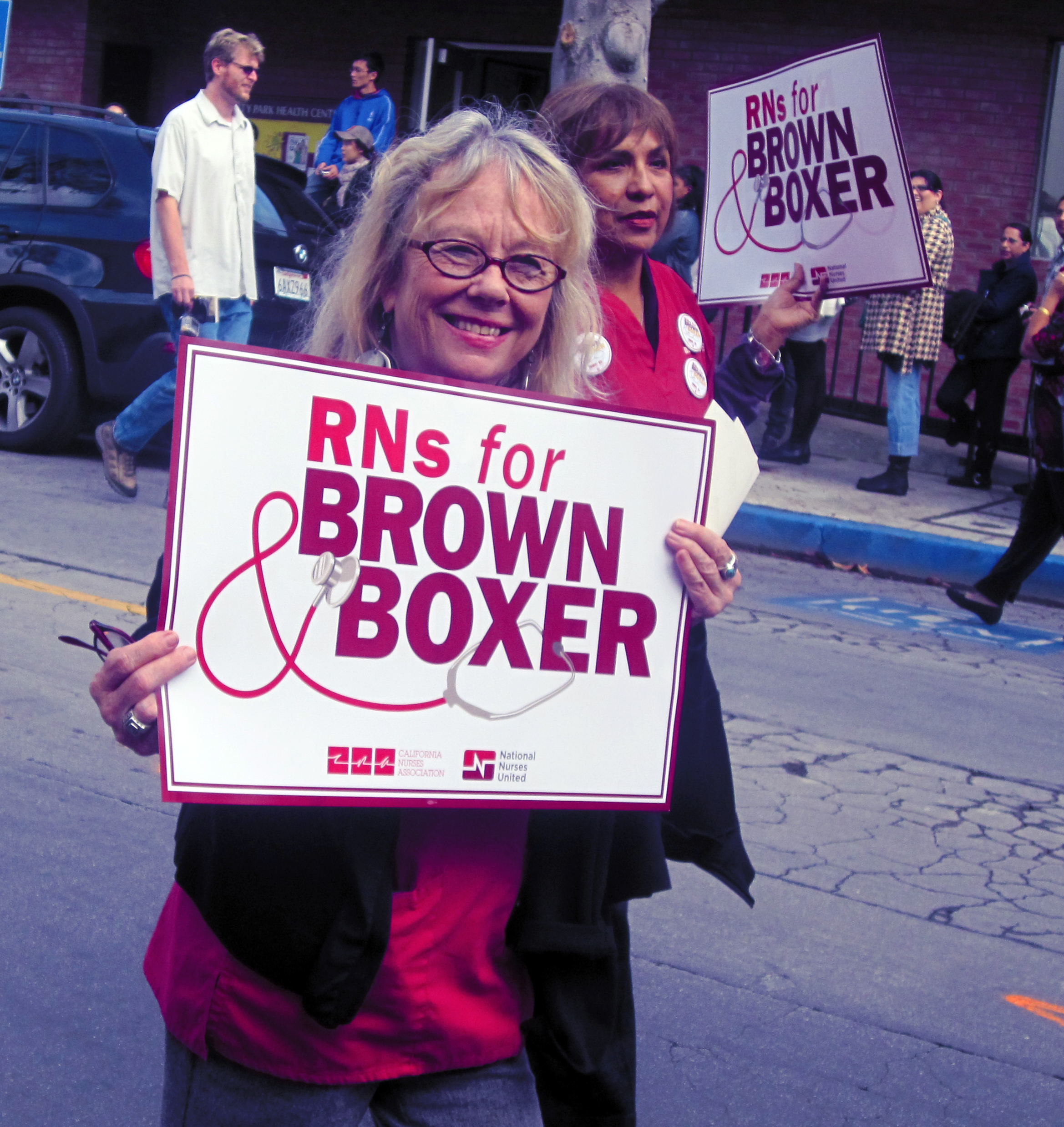
Registered nurses demonstrate their union support of Brown (and US Senate candidate Barbara Boxer).

Jerry Brown
1. Stimulate clean energy jobs (build 12,000MW of localized electricity generation; build 8,000MW of large-scale renewables; appoint a Clean Energy Czar)
2. Invest in infrastructure/construction jobs (federal dollars for projects; prioritize water needs; high-speed rail; strengthen the port system; prioritize use of existing funds for job creation; infill development
3. Create strike team to focus on job retention
4. Cut regulations (speed up regulatory processes and eliminate duplicative functions; develop CEQA guidelines; fully utilize administrative law; update outdated technology systems
5. Increase manufacturing jobs
6. Deliver targeted workforce training programs
7. Invest in education

Education: Meg Whitman
1. Direct more money to classroom
2. Reward outstanding teachers
3. Eliminate cap on charter schools
4. Grade public schools A-F
5. Establish fast-track parent process for charter school conversions
6. Invest $1 billion in UC and CSU University systems
7. Utilize alternative paths to the classroom to attract high quality teachers

Jerry Brown
1. Higher education (create new state master plan; focus on community colleges and transfer credits)
2. Overhaul state testing program
3. Change school funding formulas and consolidate the 62 existing categorical programs
4. Teacher recruitment and training
5. Simplify the Education Code and return more decision-making to local school districts
6. A more balanced and creative school curriculum (science, history, and humanities; experiment with online, etc.)
7. Place special emphasis on teaching science, technology, engineering, and math
8. Increase proficiency in English
9. Improve high school graduation rates
10. Charter schools
11. Magnet or theme schools
12. Citizenship and character

=== Predictions ===
Source	Ranking	As of
Cook Political Report	Tossup	October 14, 2010
Rothenberg	Lean D (flip)	October 28, 2010
RealClearPolitics	Lean D (flip)	November 1, 2010
Sabato's Crystal Ball	Lean D (flip)	October 28, 2010
CQ Politics	Lean D (flip)	October 28, 2010

=== Polling ===
View source data.

Poll source	Date(s) administered	Sample size	Margin of error	Jerry Brown (D)	Meg Whitman (R)	Other	Undecided
Rasmussen Reports	January 14, 2009	500	±4.5%	40%	38%	––	––
Research 2000	August 9, 2009	600	±4.0%	42%	36%	––	––
Rasmussen Reports	September 24, 2009	500	±4.5%	44%	35%	3%	18%
The Field Poll	Sept. 15–Oct. 5, 2009	1,005	±3.2%	50%	29%	––	21%
Rasmussen Reports	November 17, 2009	500	±4.5%	41%	41%	3%	14%
Public Policy Institute of California	December 16, 2009	2,004	±2.0%	43%	37%	––	20%
The Field Poll	January 5–17, 2010	958	±3.3%	46%	36%	––	18%
Rasmussen Reports	January 19, 2010	500	±4.5%	43%	39%	7%	11%
Public Policy Institute of California	January 27, 2010	2,001	±2.0%	41%	36%	––	23%
Rasmussen Reports	February 15, 2010	500	±4.5%	43%	43%	6%	8%
Research 2000	March 10, 2010	600	±4.0%	45%	41%	––	14%
Rasmussen Reports	March 15, 2010	500	±4.5%	40%	40%	6%	14%
The Field Poll	March 17, 2010	748	±3.7%	43%	46%	––	11%
Public Policy Institute of California	March 24, 2010	2,002	±2.0%	39%	44%	––	17%
USC/Los Angeles Times	March 23–30, 2010	––	––	41%	44%	––	––
Rasmussen Reports	April 19, 2010	500	±4.5%	44%	38%	9%	9%
Public Policy Institute of California	May 9–16, 2010	2,003	±2.0%	42%	37%	––	21%
Research 2000	May 17–19, 2010	600	±4.0%	46%	42%	––	18%
Public Policy Polling	May 21–23, 2010	921	±3.2%	48%	36%	––	16%
Rasmussen Reports	May 24, 2010	500	±4.5%	45%	41%	8%	7%
USC/Los Angeles Times	May 19–26, 2010	––	––	44%	38%	––	––
Rasmussen Reports	June 9, 2010	500	±4.5%	45%	44%	4%	7%
Reuters	June 30, 2010	600	±4.5%	45%	39%	3%	14%
The Field Poll	June 22-July 5, 2010	1,005	±3.2%	44%	43%	––	13%
Survey USA	July 8–11, 2010	614	±4.0%	39%	46%	7%	8%
Rasmussen Reports	July 12, 2010	500	±4.5%	46%	47%	4%	3%
Public Policy Polling	July 23–25, 2010	614	±3.95%	46%	40%	––	14%
Rasmussen Reports	August 3, 2010	750	±4.0%	43%	41%	6%	10%
Survey USA	August 9–11, 2010	602	± 4.1%	43%	44%	—	13%
Rasmussen Reports	August 24, 2010	750	±4.0%	40%	48%	6%	6%
Survey USA	August 31-September 1, 2010	569	±4.2%	40%	47%	9%	4%
Rasmussen Reports	September 6, 2010	750	±4.0%	45%	48%	3%	4%
CNN	September 2–7, 2010	866	± 3.5%	46%	48%	—	—
FOX News	September 11, 2010	1,000	± 3%	43%	49%	4%	4%
Public Policy Polling	September 14–16, 2010	630	±3.9%	47%	42%	––	12%
Field Poll	September 14–21, 2010	599	±4.1%	41%	41%	––	18%
Fox News/Pulse Opinion Research	September 18, 2010	1,000	±3.0%	45%	45%	4%	6%
Rasmussen Reports	September 20, 2010	750	±4.0%	47%	46%	4%	3%
Survey USA	September 19–21, 2010	610	±4.0%	46%	43%	8%	3%
The Los Angeles Times/USC	September 15–22, 2010	1,500	±3.3%	49%	44%	--	--
PPIC	September 19–26, 2010	1,104	±3%	37%	38%	7%	18%
CNN/Time/Opinion Research Corporation	September 24–28, 2010	786	±3.5%	52%	43%	5%	3%
Rasmussen Reports	October 3, 2010	750	±4.0%	49%	44%	4%	4%
Reuters/Ipsos	October 4, 2010	600	±4%	50%	43%	—	—
Angus Reid Public Opinion	October 6, 2010	501	±4.5%	53%	41%	6%	—
Rasmussen Reports	October 13, 2010	750	±4.0%	50%	44%	2%	4%
Los Angeles Times/USC	October 13–20, 2010	1,501	±2.5%	52%	39%	3%	6%
Reuters (report)	October 12–14, 2010	601	± 4.0%	48%	44%	3%	6%
FOX News/POR-Rasmussen	October 16, 2010	1,000	±3%	48%	43%	4%	4%
PPIC	October 10–17, 2010	1,067	±3.1%	44%	36%	4%	16%
SurveyUSA	October 15–18, 2010	621	±4%	47%	40%	8%	5%
Rasmussen Reports	October 21, 2010	750	±4%	48%	42%	4%	6%
FOX News/POR-Rasmussen	October 23, 2010	1,000	±3%	50%	41%	6%	3%
Suffolk University	October 21–24, 2010	600	±4%	50%	42%	5%	3%
CNN/Time	October 20–26, 2010	888	±3.5%	51%	44%	2%	2%
Rasmussen Reports	October 27, 2010	750	±4%	49%	45%	2%	3%
Angus Reid Public Opinion	October 28–29, 2010	486	±4.5%	49%	44%	7%	—
Survey USA	October 26–31, 2010	587	± 4%	48%	37%	6%	9%
Public Policy Polling	October 29–31, 2010	882	± 3.3%	51%	46%	—	3%

Hypothetical polling

Poll source	Dates administered	Steve Poizner (R)	Jerry Brown (D)
Rasmussen Reports	May 24, 2010	42%	43%
Public Policy Polling	May 21–23, 2010	32%	48%
Research 2000	May 17–19, 2010	37%	47%
PPIC	May 2010	32%	45%
Rasmussen Reports	April 19, 2010	32%	50%
PPIC	March 24, 2010	31%	46%
Rasmussen Reports	March 15, 2010	27%	42%
Research 2000	March 10, 2010	33%	48%
Rasmussen Reports	February 15, 2010	34%	46%
PPIC	January 27, 2010	29%	44%
Rasmussen Reports	January 19, 2010	35%	45%
The Field Poll	January 5–17, 2010	31%	48%
PPIC	December 16, 2009	31%	47%
Rasmussen Reports	November 17, 2009	32%	43%
The Field Poll	September 18–Oct. 5, 2009	25%	50%
Rasmussen Reports	September 24, 2009	32%	45%
Research 2000	August 9, 2009	34%	43%
Lake Research Partners	February 17–19, 2009	30%	41%

=== Results ===
California gubernatorial election, 2010
Party	Candidate	Votes	%	±%
Democratic	Jerry Brown	5,428,149	53.77%	+14.86%
Republican	Meg Whitman	4,127,391	40.88%	−15.00%
American Independent	Chelene Nightingale	166,312	1.65%	+0.93%
Libertarian	Dale Ogden	150,895	1.49%	+0.18%
Green	Laura Wells	129,224	1.28%	−1.09%
Peace and Freedom	Carlos Alvarez	92,851	0.92%	+0.11%
Write-in		363	0.00%	
Total votes		10,095,185	100.00%	
Democratic gain from Republican		Swing	+29.86%	

==== By county ====
County	Jerry Brown Democratic		Meg Whitman Republican		Chelene Nightingale AIP		Dale Ogden Libertarian		Laura Wells Green		Carlos Alvarez PFP		All Others Write-in		Margin		Total votes cast
County	#	%	#	%	#	%	#	%	#	%	#	%	#	%	#	%	Total votes cast
Alameda	340,190	73.79%	103,947	22.55%	3,694	0.80%	3,646	0.79%	6,323	1.37%	3,207	0.70%	14	0.00%	236,243	51.24%	461,021
Alpine	319	56.56%	228	40.43%	1	0.18%	7	1.24%	4	0.71%	5	0.89%	0	0.00%	91	16.13%	564
Amador	6,750	41.53%	8,511	52.37%	431	2.65%	267	1.64%	192	1.18%	102	0.63%	0	0.00%	-1,761	-10.83%	16,253
Butte	32,789	43.11%	37,557	49.38%	2,190	2.88%	1,518	2.00%	1,359	1.79%	639	0.84%	0	0.00%	-4,768	-6.27%	76,052
Calaveras	7,737	39.06%	10,655	53.79%	617	3.12%	373	1.88%	271	1.37%	154	0.78%	0	0.00%	-2,918	-14.73%	19,807
Colusa	1,878	35.93%	3,063	58.60%	107	2.05%	59	1.13%	70	1.34%	50	0.96%	0	0.00%	-1,185	-22.67%	5,227
Contra Costa	211,125	60.64%	123,606	35.50%	3,880	1.11%	3,360	0.97%	3,971	1.14%	2,209	0.63%	0	0.00%	87,519	25.14%	348,151
Del Norte	4,093	49.98%	3,373	41.18%	288	3.52%	145	1.77%	207	2.53%	84	1.03%	0	0.00%	720	8.79%	8,190
El Dorado	29,826	38.55%	43,417	56.12%	1,643	2.12%	1,234	1.59%	886	1.15%	361	0.47%	0	0.00%	-13,591	-17.57%	77,367
Fresno	85,743	42.73%	104,780	52.22%	3,565	1.78%	1,891	0.94%	2,532	1.26%	2,141	1.07%	0	0.00%	-19,037	-9.49%	200,652
Glenn	2,407	30.35%	4,841	61.05%	282	3.56%	171	2.16%	131	1.65%	98	1.24%	0	0.00%	-2,434	-30.69%	7,930
Humboldt	28,464	56.26%	18,277	36.12%	597	1.18%	857	1.69%	2,030	4.01%	370	0.73%	1	0.00%	10,187	20.13%	50,596
Imperial	16,019	59.61%	9,118	33.93%	360	1.34%	245	0.91%	269	1.00%	860	3.20%	0	0.00%	6,901	25.68%	26,871
Inyo	3,008	43.18%	3,406	48.89%	277	3.98%	112	1.61%	114	1.64%	49	0.70%	0	0.00%	-398	-5.71%	6,966
Kern	63,347	36.69%	96,249	55.74%	5,263	3.05%	3,262	1.89%	2,248	1.30%	2,292	1.33%	3	0.00%	-32,902	-19.06%	172,664
Kings	10,607	40.29%	13,868	52.68%	765	2.91%	298	1.13%	342	1.30%	444	1.69%	0	0.00%	-3,261	-12.39%	26,324
Lake	11,004	52.04%	8,455	39.99%	567	2.68%	332	1.57%	539	2.55%	247	1.17%	0	0.00%	2,549	12.06%	21,144
Lassen	3,895	42.13%	4,632	50.10%	302	3.27%	198	2.14%	152	1.64%	66	0.71%	0	0.00%	-737	-7.97%	9,245
Los Angeles	1,455,184	62.68%	749,439	32.28%	30,310	1.31%	34,910	1.50%	27,373	1.18%	24,315	1.05%	21	0.00%	705,745	30.40%	2,321,552
Madera	12,528	36.71%	19,287	56.52%	946	2.77%	415	1.22%	511	1.50%	437	1.28%	0	0.00%	-6,759	-19.81%	34,124
Marin	80,236	70.40%	30,920	27.13%	616	0.54%	836	0.73%	999	0.88%	371	0.33%	1	0.00%	49,316	43.27%	113,979
Mariposa	3,077	37.38%	4,513	54.83%	298	3.62%	138	1.68%	136	1.65%	69	0.84%	0	0.00%	-1,436	-17.45%	8,231
Mendocino	20,186	63.28%	9,524	29.86%	565	1.77%	424	1.33%	901	2.82%	297	0.93%	0	0.00%	10,662	33.43%	31,897
Merced	21,887	45.76%	23,021	48.13%	1,075	2.25%	488	1.02%	582	1.22%	779	1.63%	0	0.00%	-1,134	-2.37%	47,832
Modoc	1,001	26.56%	2,444	64.84%	135	3.58%	77	2.04%	77	2.04%	35	0.93%	0	0.00%	-1,443	-38.29%	3,769
Mono	2,028	46.09%	2,079	48.13%	84	1.91%	86	1.95%	88	2.00%	35	0.80%	0	0.00%	-51	-1.16%	4,400
Monterey	60,015	60.08%	35,119	35.16%	1,185	1.19%	1,137	1.14%	1,260	1.26%	1,179	1.18%	0	0.00%	24,896	24.92%	99,895
Napa	26,766	57.06%	17,873	38.10%	645	1.38%	537	1.14%	752	1.60%	335	0.71%	0	0.00%	8,893	18.96%	46,908
Nevada	20,740	45.43%	22,545	49.38%	605	1.33%	874	1.91%	725	1.59%	168	0.37%	0	0.00%	-1,805	-3.95%	45,657
Orange	328,663	37.35%	499,878	56.81%	15,153	1.72%	18,514	2.10%	10,635	1.21%	7,085	0.81%	9	0.00%	-171,215	-19.46%	879,937
Placer	54,576	38.21%	81,410	56.99%	2,706	1.89%	2,082	1.46%	1,449	1.01%	618	0.43%	2	0.00%	-26,834	-18.79%	142,843
Plumas	3,444	37.42%	5,168	56.16%	231	2.51%	135	1.47%	160	1.74%	65	0.71%	0	0.00%	-1,724	-18.73%	9,203
Riverside	206,398	42.70%	244,659	50.61%	12,107	2.50%	9,653	2.00%	5,420	1.12%	5,138	1.06%	1	0.00%	-38,261	-7.92%	483,376
Sacramento	239,599	56.74%	162,369	38.45%	7,185	1.70%	5,693	1.35%	4,622	1.09%	2,838	0.67%	2	0.00%	77,230	18.29%	422,308
San Benito	8,304	51.52%	6,993	43.39%	253	1.57%	170	1.05%	214	1.33%	183	1.14%	0	0.00%	1,311	8.13%	16,117
San Bernardino	197,578	45.40%	202,217	46.47%	13,337	3.06%	9,972	2.29%	6,318	1.45%	5,778	1.33%	2	0.00%	-4,639	-1.07%	435,202
San Diego	399,845	44.03%	452,205	49.79%	18,135	2.00%	15,362	1.69%	12,409	1.37%	9,989	1.10%	277	0.03%	-52,360	-5.77%	908,222
San Francisco	219,330	78.85%	49,151	17.67%	1.211	0.44%	2,203	0.79%	4,052	1.46%	2,208	0.79%	11	0.00%	170,179	61.18%	278,166
San Joaquin	77,623	48.86%	71,999	45.32%	3,548	2.23%	1,881	1.18%	1,915	1.21%	1,900	1.20%	1	0.00%	5,624	3.54%	158,867
San Luis Obispo	47,663	45.11%	52,056	49.27%	1,916	1.81%	1,847	1.75%	1.563	1.48%	606	0.57%	1	0.00%	-4,393	-4.16%	105,652
San Mateo	145,970	65.68%	69,212	31.14%	1,468	0.66%	1,946	0.88%	2,449	1.10%	1,197	0.54%	4	0.00%	76,758	34.54%	222,246
Santa Barbara	65,011	49.40%	59,615	45.30%	2,017	1.53%	1,931	1.47%	1,834	1.39%	1,202	0.91%	1	0.00%	5,396	4.10%	131,611
Santa Clara	314,022	61.29%	178,695	34.88%	4,880	0.95%	5,707	1.11%	5,685	1.11%	3,362	0.66%	7	0.00%	135,327	26.41%	512,358
Santa Cruz	67,107	69.72%	24,390	25.34%	1,126	1.17%	1,215	1.26%	1,683	1.75%	728	0.76%	2	0.00%	42,717	44.38%	96,251
Shasta	20,797	31.86%	39,702	60.82%	1,969	3.02%	1,337	2.05%	971	1.49%	500	0.77%	0	0.00%	-18,905	-28.96%	65,276
Sierra	635	34.76%	1,042	57.03%	54	2.96%	41	2.24%	26	1.42%	29	1.59%	0	0.00%	-407	-22.28%	1,827
Siskiyou	7,274	39.58%	9,839	53.54%	480	2.61%	357	1.94%	278	1.51%	150	0.82%	0	0.00%	-2,565	-13.96%	18,378
Solano	69,597	58.79%	43,323	36.59%	1,843	1.56%	1,398	1.18%	1,369	1.16%	860	0.73%	0	0.00%	26,274	22.19%	118,390
Sonoma	119,079	64.70%	55,472	30.14%	2,558	1.39%	2,301	1.25%	3,195	1.74%	1,445	0.79%	0	0.00%	63,607	34.56%	184,050
Stanislaus	52,510	43.64%	60,084	49.93%	3,173	2.64%	1,508	1.25%	1,642	1.36%	1,412	1.17%	1	0.00%	-7,574	-6.29%	120,330
Sutter	9,614	37.56%	14,346	56.05%	663	2.59%	442	1.73%	270	1.05%	262	1.02%	0	0.00%	-4,732	-18.49%	25,597
Tehama	6,542	32.42%	11,935	59.14%	734	3.64%	466	2.31%	311	1.54%	192	0.95%	0	0.00%	-5,393	-26.72%	20,180
Trinity	2,463	44.23%	2,569	46.13%	165	2.96%	115	2.07%	212	3.81%	45	0.81%	0	0.00%	-106	-1.90%	5,569
Tulare	30,607	37.51%	46,261	56.69%	2,059	2.52%	786	0.96%	958	1.17%	925	1.13%	1	0.00%	-15,654	-19.18%	81,597
Tuolumne	9,023	40.21%	11,963	53.32%	646	2.88%	354	1.58%	317	1.41%	134	0.60%	0	0.00%	-2,940	-13.10%	22,437
Ventura	117,800	45.32%	128,082	49.27%	4,130	1.59%	4,545	1.75%	3,315	1.28%	2,067	0.80%	1	0.00%	-10,282	-3.96%	259,940
Yolo	37,894	63.27%	19,456	32.48%	755	1.26%	707	1.18%	690	1.15%	392	0.65%	0	0.00%	18,438	30.78%	59,894
Yuba	6,332	39.35%	8,553	53.15%	517	3.21%	330	2.05%	218	1.35%	143	0.89%	0	0.00%	-2,221	-13.80%	16,093
Total	5,428,149	53.77%	4,127,391	40.88%	166,312	1.65%	150,895	1.49%	129,224	1.28%	92,851	0.92%	363	0.00%	1,300,758	12.88%	10,095,185

Counties that flipped from Republican to Democratic

- Alpine (largest municipality: Markleeville)
- Contra Costa (largest municipality: Concord)
- Del Norte (largest municipality: Crescent City)
- Humboldt (largest municipality: Eureka)
- Imperial (largest municipality: El Centro)
- Lake (largest municipality: Clearlake)
- Mendocino (largest municipality: Ukiah)
- Monterey (largest municipality: Salinas)
- Napa (largest municipality: Napa)
- Sacramento (largest municipality: Sacramento)
- San Benito (largest municipality: Hollister)
- San Joaquin (largest city: Stockton)
- Santa Barbara (largest municipality: Santa Barbara)
- Santa Clara (largest municipality: San Jose)
- Solano (largest municipality: Vallejo)
- Sonoma (largest municipality: Santa Rosa)
- Yolo (largest municipality: Davis)

==== By congressional district ====
Brown won 34 of 53 congressional districts, with the remaining 19 going to Whitman. Each candidate won a district that elected a representative of the other party.

District	Whitman	Brown	Representative
1st	35%	59%	Mike Thompson
2nd	55%	38%	Wally Herger
3rd	47%	48%	Dan Lungren
4th	55%	39%	Tom McClintock
5th	27%	68%	Doris Matsui
6th	28%	68%	Lynn Woolsey
7th	28%	67%	George Miller
8th	16%	80%	Nancy Pelosi
9th	11%	85%	Barbara Lee
10th	39%	57%	John Garamendi
11th	49%	47%	Jerry McNerney
12th	29%	68%	Jackie Speier
13th	27%	69%	Pete Stark
14th	33%	64%	Anna Eshoo
15th	36%	60%	Mike Honda
16th	33%	62%	Zoe Lofgren
17th	31%	64%	Sam Farr
18th	41%	52%	Dennis Cardoza
19th	55%	40%	George Radanovich (111th Congress)
19th	55%	40%	Jeff Denham (112th Congress)
20th	37%	56%	Jim Costa
21st	58%	36%	Devin Nunes
22nd	58%	34%	Kevin McCarthy
23rd	39%	56%	Lois Capps
24th	54%	41%	Elton Gallegly
25th	51%	41%	Buck McKeon
26th	50%	44%	David Dreier
27th	37%	58%	Brad Sherman
28th	26%	69%	Howard Berman
29th	35%	61%	Adam Schiff
30th	35%	62%	Henry Waxman
31st	17%	78%	Xavier Becerra
32nd	29%	65%	Judy Chu
33rd	13%	83%	Diane Watson (111th Congress)
33rd	13%	83%	Karen Bass (112th Congress)
34th	23%	72%	Lucille Roybal-Allard
35th	16%	79%	Maxine Waters
36th	39%	56%	Jane Harman
37th	20%	74%	Laura Richardson
38th	26%	68%	Grace Napolitano
39th	34%	60%	Linda Sánchez
40th	56%	38%	Ed Royce
41st	53%	38%	Jerry Lewis
42nd	59%	35%	Gary Miller
43rd	30%	62%	Joe Baca
44th	53%	41%	Ken Calvert
45th	50%	44%	Mary Bono
46th	56%	39%	Dana Rohrabacher
47th	38%	54%	Loretta Sanchez
48th	59%	36%	John B. T. Campbell III
49th	57%	36%	Darrell Issa
50th	55%	40%	Brian Bilbray
51st	36%	56%	Bob Filner
52nd	57%	37%	Duncan L. Hunter
53rd	36%	58%	Susan Davis

==== By city ====
By municipality

Official outcome by city and unincorporated areas of counties, of which Brown won 314, Whitman won 223, & 1 tied.
City	County	Jerry Brown Democratic		Meg Whitman Republican		Various candidates Other parties		Margin		Total Votes	2006 to 2010 Swing %
City	County	#	%	#	%	#	%	#	%	Total Votes	2006 to 2010 Swing %
Alameda	Alameda	20,923	74.78%	6,167	22.04%	888	3.17%	14,756	52.74%	27,978	39.20%
Albany	Alameda	6,245	87.49%	710	9.95%	183	2.56%	5,535	77.54%	7,138	32.64%
Berkeley	Alameda	44,247	90.91%	2,958	6.08%	1,466	3.01%	41,289	84.83%	48,671	29.12%
Dublin	Alameda	6,953	56.13%	4,899	39.55%	536	4.33%	2,054	16.58%	12,388	37.19%
Emeryville	Alameda	2,659	84.17%	409	12.95%	91	2.88%	2,250	71.23%	3,159	23.91%
Fremont	Alameda	33,547	62.24%	18,458	34.25%	1,891	3.51%	15,089	28.00%	53,896	32.00%
Hayward	Alameda	21,139	73.17%	6,375	22.07%	1,376	4.76%	14,764	51.10%	28,890	29.17%
Livermore	Alameda	14,323	48.61%	13,791	46.81%	1,350	4.58%	532	1.81%	29,464	34.17%
Newark	Alameda	7,081	65.45%	3,268	30.21%	470	4.34%	3,813	35.24%	10,819	27.60%
Oakland	Alameda	108,234	88.22%	10,010	8.16%	4,444	3.62%	98,224	80.06%	122,688	28.66%
Piedmont	Alameda	4,484	72.67%	1,610	26.09%	76	1.23%	2,874	46.58%	6,170	52.70%
Pleasanton	Alameda	13,904	50.18%	13,013	46.96%	794	2.87%	891	3.22%	27,711	35.83%
San Leandro	Alameda	17,217	72.46%	5,563	23.41%	982	4.13%	11,654	49.04%	23,762	29.70%
Union City	Alameda	11,728	71.22%	4,170	25.32%	570	3.46%	7,558	45.90%	16,468	26.25%
Unincorporated Area	Alameda	27,506	65.80%	12,546	30.01%	1,753	4.19%	14,960	35.79%	41,805	33.52%
Unincorporated Area	Alpine	319	56.56%	228	40.43%	17	3.01%	91	16.13%	564	30.28%
Amador	Amador	38	44.71%	38	44.71%	9	10.59%	0	0.00%	85	40.86%
Ione	Amador	706	44.04%	816	50.90%	81	5.05%	-110	-6.86%	1,603	42.24%
Jackson	Amador	769	42.30%	942	51.82%	107	5.89%	-173	-9.52%	1,818	35.05%
Plymouth	Amador	139	39.49%	181	51.42%	32	9.09%	-42	-11.93%	352	41.18%
Sutter Creek	Amador	627	47.72%	611	46.50%	76	5.78%	16	1.22%	1,314	41.22%
Unincorporated Area	Amador	4,471	40.35%	5,923	53.45%	687	6.20%	-1,452	-13.10%	11,081	38.41%
Biggs	Butte	153	37.68%	215	52.96%	38	9.36%	-62	-15.27%	406	34.36%
Chico	Butte	14,427	52.00%	11,404	41.10%	1,914	6.90%	3,023	10.90%	27,745	34.80%
Gridley	Butte	659	44.47%	706	47.64%	117	7.89%	-47	-3.17%	1,482	25.78%
Oroville	Butte	1,417	41.54%	1,643	48.17%	351	10.29%	-226	-6.63%	3,411	33.03%
Paradise	Butte	4,339	39.34%	5,792	52.52%	898	8.14%	-1,453	-13.17%	11,029	30.97%
Unincorporated Area	Butte	11,794	36.88%	17,797	55.65%	2,388	7.47%	-6,003	-18.77%	31,979	29.73%
Angels	Calaveras	640	38.62%	891	53.77%	126	7.60%	-251	-15.15%	1,657	37.65%
Unincorporated Area	Calaveras	7,097	39.10%	9,764	53.80%	1,289	7.10%	-2,667	-14.69%	18,150	31.51%
Colusa	Colusa	634	40.10%	855	54.08%	92	5.82%	-221	-13.98%	1,581	36.70%
Williams	Colusa	310	48.90%	284	44.79%	40	6.31%	26	4.10%	634	34.12%
Unincorporated Area	Colusa	934	31.01%	1,924	63.88%	154	5.11%	-990	-32.87%	3,012	23.27%
Antioch	Contra Costa	15,603	63.28%	7,802	31.64%	1,253	5.08%	7,801	31.64%	24,658	32.72%
Brentwood	Contra Costa	8,042	50.77%	7,088	44.75%	710	4.48%	954	6.02%	15,840	34.58%
Clayton	Contra Costa	2,550	47.46%	2,653	49.38%	170	3.16%	-103	-1.92%	5,373	38.70%
Concord	Contra Costa	21,903	59.26%	13,121	35.50%	1,939	5.25%	8,782	23.76%	36,963	34.65%
Danville	Contra Costa	8,997	44.67%	10,694	53.09%	451	2.24%	-1,697	-8.43%	20,142	37.74%
El Cerrito	Contra Costa	8,639	82.49%	1,549	14.79%	285	2.72%	7,090	67.70%	10,473	31.23%
Hercules	Contra Costa	5,422	73.60%	1,691	22.95%	254	3.45%	3,731	50.64%	7,367	31.09%
Lafayette	Contra Costa	7,159	56.88%	5,168	41.06%	260	2.07%	1,991	15.82%	12,587	43.82%
Martinez	Contra Costa	9,262	62.39%	4,848	32.66%	736	4.96%	4,414	29.73%	14,846	37.67%
Moraga	Contra Costa	4,115	53.30%	3,443	44.60%	162	2.10%	672	8.70%	7,720	40.69%
Oakley	Contra Costa	4,879	55.95%	3,259	37.37%	583	6.69%	1,620	18.58%	8,721	30.45%
Orinda	Contra Costa	5,813	57.53%	4,104	40.61%	188	1.86%	1,709	16.91%	10,105	46.07%
Pinole	Contra Costa	4,560	69.25%	1,774	26.94%	251	3.81%	2,786	42.31%	6,585	30.91%
Pittsburg	Contra Costa	9,721	73.08%	2,865	21.54%	716	5.38%	6,856	51.54%	13,302	29.84%
Pleasant Hill	Contra Costa	8,207	61.43%	4,554	34.09%	598	4.48%	3,653	27.34%	13,359	37.08%
Richmond	Contra Costa	21,140	84.25%	3,057	12.18%	894	3.56%	18,083	72.07%	25,091	27.56%
San Pablo	Contra Costa	3,281	80.54%	555	13.62%	238	5.84%	2,726	66.91%	4,074	23.01%
San Ramon	Contra Costa	11,529	50.90%	10,406	45.94%	717	3.17%	1,123	4.96%	22,652	37.95%
Walnut Creek	Contra Costa	17,747	57.81%	12,070	39.31%	884	2.88%	5,677	18.49%	30,701	40.65%
Unincorporated Area	Contra Costa	32,556	56.53%	22,905	39.77%	2,131	3.70%	9,651	16.76%	57,592	32.26%
Crescent City	Del Norte	550	55.28%	350	35.18%	95	9.55%	200	20.10%	995	24.37%
Unincorporated Area	Del Norte	3,543	49.24%	3,023	42.02%	629	8.74%	520	7.23%	7,195	25.57%
Placerville	El Dorado	1,657	45.62%	1,732	47.69%	243	6.69%	-75	-2.06%	3,632	40.67%
South Lake Tahoe	El Dorado	2,647	56.94%	1,694	36.44%	308	6.63%	953	20.50%	4,649	38.44%
Unincorporated Area	El Dorado	25,522	36.94%	39,991	57.89%	3,573	5.17%	-14,469	-20.94%	69,086	33.87%
Clovis	Fresno	9,287	31.11%	19,244	64.47%	1,317	4.41%	-9,957	-33.36%	29,848	21.20%
Coalinga	Fresno	1,015	48.06%	950	44.98%	147	6.96%	65	3.08%	2,112	35.45%
Firebaugh	Fresno	515	60.30%	286	33.49%	53	6.21%	229	26.81%	854	29.74%
Fowler	Fresno	622	49.40%	582	46.23%	55	4.37%	40	3.18%	1,259	24.46%
Fresno	Fresno	11,969	67.08%	4,775	26.76%	1,099	6.16%	7,194	40.32%	17,843	68.18%
Huron	Fresno	353	79.50%	59	13.29%	32	7.21%	294	66.22%	444	15.81%
Kerman	Fresno	1,163	51.51%	979	43.36%	116	5.14%	184	8.15%	2,258	24.53%
Kingsburg	Fresno	925	26.48%	2,360	67.56%	208	5.95%	-1,435	-41.08%	3,493	18.44%
Mendota	Fresno	652	77.34%	141	16.73%	50	5.93%	511	60.62%	843	29.87%
Orange Cove	Fresno	960	73.56%	230	17.62%	115	8.81%	730	55.94%	1,305	16.32%
Parlier	Fresno	1,091	79.87%	207	15.15%	68	4.98%	884	64.71%	1,366	19.63%
Reedley	Fresno	1,816	41.67%	2,337	53.63%	205	4.70%	-521	-11.96%	4,358	23.57%
San Joaquin	Fresno	211	73.78%	57	19.93%	18	6.29%	154	53.85%	286	23.42%
Sanger	Fresno	2,491	57.48%	1,626	37.52%	217	5.01%	865	19.96%	4,334	23.64%
Selma	Fresno	1,969	51.87%	1,610	42.41%	217	5.72%	359	9.46%	3,796	27.58%
Unincorporated Area	Fresno	15,686	33.00%	29,520	62.10%	2,327	4.90%	-13,834	-29.10%	47,533	20.78%
Multiple Districts	Fresno	35,018	44.48%	39,817	50.58%	3,885	4.94%	-4,799	-6.10%	78,720	N/A
Orland	Glenn	619	35.17%	961	54.60%	180	10.23%	-342	-19.43%	1,760	29.62%
Willows	Glenn	528	32.67%	948	58.66%	140	8.66%	-420	-25.99%	1,616	31.10%
Unincorporated Area	Glenn	1,260	27.67%	2,932	64.38%	362	7.95%	-1,672	-36.71%	4,554	24.30%
Arcata	Humboldt	4,994	73.53%	1,132	16.67%	666	9.81%	3,862	56.86%	6,792	26.81%
Blue Lake	Humboldt	337	62.52%	165	30.61%	37	6.86%	172	31.91%	539	27.19%
Eureka	Humboldt	5,107	56.75%	3,197	35.53%	695	7.72%	1,910	21.22%	8,999	29.00%
Ferndale	Humboldt	322	46.46%	338	48.77%	33	4.76%	-16	-2.31%	693	24.87%
Fortuna	Humboldt	1,633	40.23%	2,104	51.84%	322	7.93%	-471	-11.60%	4,059	24.36%
Rio Dell	Humboldt	388	39.27%	502	50.81%	98	9.92%	-114	-11.54%	988	25.28%
Trinidad	Humboldt	145	72.50%	47	23.50%	8	4.00%	98	49.00%	200	25.92%
Unincorporated Area	Humboldt	15,538	54.86%	10,792	38.10%	1,995	7.04%	4,746	16.76%	28,325	27.97%
Brawley	Imperial	2,710	59.51%	1,637	35.95%	207	4.55%	1,073	23.56%	4,554	27.60%
Calexico	Imperial	4,141	80.13%	634	12.27%	393	7.60%	3,507	67.86%	5,168	25.63%
Calipatria	Imperial	366	70.25%	122	23.42%	33	6.33%	244	46.83%	521	38.42%
El Centro	Imperial	4,307	59.19%	2,504	34.41%	465	6.39%	1,803	24.78%	7,276	29.06%
Holtville	Imperial	494	50.31%	416	42.36%	72	7.33%	78	7.94%	982	24.27%
Imperial	Imperial	1,467	52.79%	1,147	41.27%	165	5.94%	320	11.51%	2,779	26.00%
Westmorland	Imperial	202	61.21%	107	32.42%	21	6.36%	95	28.79%	330	40.53%
Unincorporated Area	Imperial	2,332	44.33%	2,551	48.49%	378	7.18%	-219	-4.16%	5,261	25.64%
Bishop	Inyo	516	47.56%	457	42.12%	112	10.32%	59	5.44%	1,085	30.03%
Unincorporated Area	Inyo	2,492	42.37%	2,949	50.14%	440	7.48%	-457	-7.77%	5,881	29.48%
Arvin	Kern	991	69.50%	321	22.51%	114	7.99%	670	46.98%	1,426	37.80%
Bakersfield	Kern	29,414	38.16%	42,953	55.73%	4,713	6.11%	-13,539	-17.56%	77,080	29.70%
California City	Kern	960	34.01%	1,520	53.84%	343	12.15%	-560	-19.84%	2,823	31.95%
Delano	Kern	3,324	71.53%	1,046	22.51%	277	5.96%	2,278	49.02%	4,647	41.53%
Maricopa	Kern	56	19.79%	185	65.37%	42	14.84%	-129	-45.58%	283	20.85%
McFarland	Kern	750	69.12%	250	23.04%	85	7.83%	500	46.08%	1,085	30.39%
Ridgecrest	Kern	2,325	27.22%	5,410	63.34%	806	9.44%	-3,085	-36.12%	8,541	18.43%
Shafter	Kern	1,124	48.98%	996	43.40%	175	7.63%	128	5.58%	2,295	37.37%
Taft	Kern	390	22.49%	1,211	69.84%	133	7.67%	-821	-47.35%	1,734	23.75%
Tehachapi	Kern	917	37.23%	1,303	52.90%	243	9.87%	-386	-15.67%	2,463	30.05%
Wasco	Kern	1,345	56.99%	823	34.87%	192	8.14%	522	22.12%	2,360	42.53%
Unincorporated Area	Kern	21,751	32.02%	40,231	59.23%	5,942	8.75%	-18,480	-27.21%	67,924	27.15%
Avenal	Kings	384	60.19%	188	29.47%	66	10.34%	196	30.72%	638	27.60%
Corcoran	Kings	1,148	61.65%	577	30.99%	137	7.36%	571	30.67%	1,862	29.44%
Hanford	Kings	5,033	40.99%	6,404	52.15%	842	6.86%	-1,371	-11.17%	12,279	30.44%
Lemoore	Kings	2,004	39.63%	2,692	53.23%	361	7.14%	-688	-13.60%	5,057	33.34%
Unincorporated Area	Kings	2,038	31.41%	4,007	61.76%	443	6.83%	-1,969	-30.35%	6,488	20.84%
Clearlake	Lake	1,867	57.62%	1,057	32.62%	316	9.75%	810	25.00%	3,240	30.26%
Lakeport	Lake	876	50.46%	734	42.28%	126	7.26%	142	8.18%	1,736	30.46%
Unincorporated Area	Lake	8,261	51.09%	6,664	41.22%	1,243	7.69%	1,597	9.88%	16,168	32.71%
Susanville	Lassen	1,432	49.60%	1,237	42.85%	218	7.55%	195	6.75%	2,887	36.02%
Unincorporated Area	Lassen	2,463	38.74%	3,395	53.40%	500	7.86%	-932	-14.66%	6,358	28.02%
Agoura Hills	Los Angeles	4,037	46.49%	4,295	49.46%	352	4.05%	-258	-2.97%	8,684	24.86%
Alhambra	Los Angeles	11,075	64.58%	5,267	30.71%	807	4.71%	5,808	33.87%	17,149	26.51%
Arcadia	Los Angeles	6,012	41.00%	8,070	55.03%	583	3.98%	-2,058	-14.03%	14,665	26.83%
Artesia	Los Angeles	1,618	54.75%	1,160	39.26%	177	5.99%	458	15.50%	2,955	34.31%
Avalon	Los Angeles	456	46.72%	447	45.80%	73	7.48%	9	0.92%	976	23.29%
Azusa	Los Angeles	5,505	60.43%	2,914	31.99%	690	7.57%	2,591	28.44%	9,109	29.24%
Baldwin Park	Los Angeles	8,403	73.63%	2,235	19.58%	775	6.79%	6,168	54.04%	11,413	17.30%
Bell	Los Angeles	3,732	79.93%	727	15.57%	210	4.50%	3,005	64.36%	4,669	13.85%
Bell Gardens	Los Angeles	3,647	80.35%	652	14.36%	240	5.29%	2,995	65.98%	4,539	8.57%
Bellflower	Los Angeles	8,462	59.17%	4,924	34.43%	915	6.40%	3,538	24.74%	14,301	28.49%
Beverly Hills	Los Angeles	7,156	54.95%	5,579	42.84%	288	2.21%	1,577	12.11%	13,023	16.39%
Bradbury	Los Angeles	117	30.95%	247	65.34%	14	3.70%	-130	-34.39%	378	22.56%
Burbank	Los Angeles	17,818	56.19%	12,079	38.09%	1,811	5.71%	5,739	18.10%	31,708	36.20%
Calabasas	Los Angeles	4,194	49.92%	3,988	47.47%	219	2.61%	206	2.45%	8,401	25.45%
Carson	Los Angeles	19,010	75.28%	5,060	20.04%	1,181	4.68%	13,950	55.25%	25,251	26.15%
Cerritos	Los Angeles	8,087	51.12%	7,109	44.93%	625	3.95%	978	6.18%	15,821	24.49%
Claremont	Los Angeles	8,254	57.72%	5,426	37.94%	621	4.34%	2,828	19.77%	14,301	28.44%
Commerce	Los Angeles	2,126	78.13%	437	16.06%	158	5.81%	1,689	62.07%	2,721	4.65%
Compton	Los Angeles	14,783	91.69%	759	4.71%	580	3.60%	14,024	86.99%	16,122	16.18%
Covina	Los Angeles	6,364	50.60%	5,409	43.01%	804	6.39%	955	7.59%	12,577	30.47%
Cudahy	Los Angeles	1,932	80.60%	337	14.06%	128	5.34%	1,595	66.54%	2,397	8.90%
Culver City	Los Angeles	11,810	72.89%	3,759	23.20%	634	3.91%	8,051	49.69%	16,203	33.27%
Diamond Bar	Los Angeles	7,271	47.03%	7,449	48.18%	741	4.79%	-178	-1.15%	15,461	26.52%
Downey	Los Angeles	14,314	57.29%	9,269	37.10%	1,400	5.60%	5,045	20.19%	24,983	25.21%
Duarte	Los Angeles	3,576	59.00%	2,125	35.06%	360	5.94%	1,451	23.94%	6,061	28.44%
El Monte	Los Angeles	9,385	70.03%	3,175	23.69%	842	6.28%	6,210	46.34%	13,402	25.24%
El Segundo	Los Angeles	2,925	43.00%	3,489	51.29%	389	5.72%	-564	-8.29%	6,803	29.81%
Gardena	Los Angeles	9,995	73.54%	2,936	21.60%	661	4.86%	7,059	51.93%	13,592	23.82%
Glendale	Los Angeles	24,362	56.38%	16,771	38.81%	2,079	4.81%	7,591	17.57%	43,212	30.58%
Glendora	Los Angeles	6,582	36.71%	10,251	57.17%	1,099	6.13%	-3,669	-20.46%	17,932	24.51%
Hawaiian Gardens	Los Angeles	1,186	70.18%	393	23.25%	111	6.57%	793	46.92%	1,690	12.75%
Hawthorne	Los Angeles	11,037	73.09%	3,260	21.59%	804	5.32%	7,777	51.50%	15,101	18.73%
Hermosa Beach	Los Angeles	3,948	48.15%	3,907	47.65%	345	4.21%	41	0.50%	8,200	34.10%
Hidden Hills	Los Angeles	336	36.80%	562	61.56%	15	1.64%	-226	-24.75%	913	23.01%
Huntington Park	Los Angeles	5,561	81.67%	896	13.16%	352	5.17%	4,665	68.51%	6,809	12.06%
Industry	Los Angeles	19	33.93%	31	55.36%	6	10.71%	-12	-21.43%	56	78.57%
Inglewood	Los Angeles	22,667	88.85%	1,810	7.09%	1,035	4.06%	20,857	81.75%	25,512	21.73%
Irwindale	Los Angeles	306	69.39%	93	21.09%	42	9.52%	213	48.30%	441	15.10%
La Canada Flintridge	Los Angeles	3,744	39.12%	5,569	58.19%	258	2.70%	-1,825	-19.07%	9,571	28.60%
La Habra Heights	Los Angeles	739	29.82%	1,645	66.38%	94	3.79%	-906	-36.56%	2,478	5.27%
La Mirada	Los Angeles	6,275	42.73%	7,474	50.89%	937	6.38%	-1,199	-8.16%	14,686	22.89%
La Puente	Los Angeles	4,798	73.57%	1,290	19.78%	434	6.65%	3,508	53.79%	6,522	14.69%
La Verne	Los Angeles	4,954	40.63%	6,523	53.50%	716	5.87%	-1,569	-12.87%	12,193	23.37%
Lakewood	Los Angeles	12,636	49.13%	11,322	44.02%	1,761	6.85%	1,314	5.11%	25,719	29.56%
Lancaster	Los Angeles	14,276	43.59%	15,632	47.73%	2,846	8.69%	-1,356	-4.14%	32,754	25.83%
Lawndale	Los Angeles	3,610	64.56%	1,545	27.63%	437	7.81%	2,065	36.93%	5,592	16.03%
Lomita	Los Angeles	2,836	47.98%	2,691	45.53%	384	6.50%	145	2.45%	5,911	34.97%
Long Beach	Los Angeles	68,343	61.14%	36,700	32.83%	6,745	6.03%	31,643	28.31%	111,788	30.59%
Los Angeles	Los Angeles	590,793	70.15%	213,305	25.33%	38,075	4.52%	377,488	44.82%	842,173	27.88%
Lynwood	Los Angeles	7,739	82.84%	1,055	11.29%	548	5.87%	6,684	71.55%	9,342	9.77%
Malibu	Los Angeles	2,919	52.17%	2,528	45.18%	148	2.65%	391	6.99%	5,595	24.09%
Manhattan Beach	Los Angeles	7,162	44.12%	8,587	52.90%	483	2.98%	-1,425	-8.78%	16,232	24.73%
Maywood	Los Angeles	2,723	83.40%	391	11.98%	151	4.62%	2,332	71.42%	3,265	8.02%
Monrovia	Los Angeles	5,984	50.98%	5,037	42.91%	717	6.11%	947	8.07%	11,738	27.17%
Montebello	Los Angeles	9,631	72.88%	2,983	22.57%	600	4.54%	6,648	50.31%	13,214	23.27%
Monterey Park	Los Angeles	7,632	61.74%	4,138	33.48%	591	4.78%	3,494	28.27%	12,361	23.40%
Norwalk	Los Angeles	13,042	64.24%	5,862	28.88%	1,397	6.88%	7,180	35.37%	20,301	21.47%
Palmdale	Los Angeles	15,179	49.96%	12,707	41.83%	2,495	8.21%	2,472	8.14%	30,381	22.29%
Palos Verdes Estates	Los Angeles	2,329	33.23%	4,535	64.70%	145	2.07%	-2,206	-31.47%	7,009	22.92%
Paramount	Los Angeles	5,627	76.10%	1,315	17.78%	452	6.11%	4,312	58.32%	7,394	18.89%
Pasadena	Los Angeles	28,307	64.50%	13,897	31.66%	1,685	3.84%	14,410	32.83%	43,889	33.93%
Pico Rivera	Los Angeles	10,777	75.00%	2,806	19.53%	786	5.47%	7,971	55.47%	14,369	12.80%
Pomona	Los Angeles	15,825	66.19%	6,406	26.79%	1,679	7.02%	9,419	39.39%	23,910	23.79%
Rancho Palos Verdes	Los Angeles	7,322	39.67%	10,508	56.94%	625	3.39%	-3,186	-17.26%	18,455	20.89%
Redondo Beach	Los Angeles	12,730	49.52%	11,692	45.48%	1,287	5.01%	1,038	4.04%	25,709	26.80%
Rolling Hills	Los Angeles	238	22.80%	784	75.10%	22	2.11%	-546	-52.30%	1,044	19.33%
Rolling Hills Estates	Los Angeles	1,334	34.36%	2,432	62.65%	116	2.99%	-1,098	-28.28%	3,882	25.90%
Rosemead	Los Angeles	5,144	66.61%	2,157	27.93%	421	5.45%	2,987	38.68%	7,722	18.52%
San Dimas	Los Angeles	4,852	40.85%	6,357	53.52%	668	5.62%	-1,505	-12.67%	11,877	25.61%
San Fernando	Los Angeles	2,855	72.41%	828	21.00%	260	6.59%	2,027	51.41%	3,943	8.61%
San Gabriel	Los Angeles	4,263	56.61%	2,852	37.88%	415	5.51%	1,411	18.74%	7,530	18.76%
San Marino	Los Angeles	1,817	34.80%	3,266	62.54%	139	2.66%	-1,449	-27.75%	5,222	28.72%
Santa Clarita	Los Angeles	21,113	37.93%	31,224	56.09%	3,332	5.99%	-10,111	-18.16%	55,669	27.46%
Santa Fe Springs	Los Angeles	2,739	65.29%	1,203	28.68%	253	6.03%	1,536	36.62%	4,195	21.38%
Santa Monica	Los Angeles	26,817	72.07%	9,164	24.63%	1,227	3.30%	17,653	47.44%	37,208	30.94%
Sierra Madre	Los Angeles	2,759	49.67%	2,559	46.07%	237	4.27%	200	3.60%	5,555	30.81%
Signal Hill	Los Angeles	1,871	61.04%	1,007	32.85%	187	6.10%	864	28.19%	3,065	30.77%
South El Monte	Los Angeles	2,070	75.41%	492	17.92%	183	6.67%	1,578	57.49%	2,745	16.50%
South Gate	Los Angeles	11,093	76.91%	2,502	17.35%	828	5.74%	8,591	59.56%	14,423	9.08%
South Pasadena	Los Angeles	6,456	63.64%	3,353	33.05%	336	3.31%	3,103	30.59%	10,145	37.18%
Temple City	Los Angeles	4,318	49.71%	3,923	45.16%	445	5.12%	395	4.55%	8,686	26.90%
Torrance	Los Angeles	20,974	44.68%	23,561	50.19%	2,406	5.13%	-2,587	-5.51%	46,941	24.81%
Vernon	Los Angeles	10	32.26%	14	45.16%	7	22.58%	-4	-12.90%	31	N/A (Note: City recorded no votes in the 2006 election.)
Walnut	Los Angeles	4,223	48.80%	4,021	46.46%	410	4.74%	202	2.33%	8,654	26.50%
West Covina	Los Angeles	14,056	57.56%	8,930	36.57%	1,435	5.88%	5,126	20.99%	24,421	22.15%
West Hollywood	Los Angeles	11,026	79.06%	2,457	17.62%	464	3.33%	8,569	61.44%	13,947	28.13%
Westlake Village	Los Angeles	1,628	40.13%	2,308	56.89%	121	2.98%	-680	-16.76%	4,057	30.97%
Whittier	Los Angeles	12,770	52.02%	10,409	42.40%	1,371	5.58%	2,361	9.62%	24,550	27.40%
Unincorporated Area	Los Angeles	144,758	61.35%	78,196	33.14%	12,983	5.50%	66,562	28.21%	235,937	33.60%
Chowchilla	Madera	829	34.53%	1,377	57.35%	195	8.12%	-548	-22.82%	2,401	29.89%
Madera	Madera	4,313	51.25%	3,520	41.83%	582	6.92%	793	9.42%	8,415	33.33%
Unincorporated Area	Madera	7,386	31.69%	14,390	61.74%	1,532	6.57%	-7,004	-30.05%	23,308	23.00%
Belvedere	Marin	621	50.57%	591	48.13%	16	1.30%	30	2.44%	1,228	47.62%
Corte Madera	Marin	3,205	72.18%	1,147	25.83%	88	1.98%	2,058	46.35%	4,440	40.89%
Fairfax	Marin	3,569	85.69%	476	11.43%	120	2.88%	3,093	74.26%	4,165	37.88%
Larkspur	Marin	4,341	71.13%	1,641	26.89%	121	1.98%	2,700	44.24%	6,103	44.67%
Mill Valley	Marin	5,819	78.62%	1,476	19.94%	106	1.43%	4,343	58.68%	7,401	45.98%
Novato	Marin	13,320	63.06%	7,059	33.42%	744	3.52%	6,261	29.64%	21,123	40.54%
Ross	Marin	638	53.17%	541	45.08%	21	1.75%	97	8.08%	1,200	44.68%
San Anselmo	Marin	5,210	80.10%	1,159	17.82%	135	2.08%	4,051	62.28%	6,504	39.37%
San Rafael	Marin	15,186	70.98%	5,631	26.32%	578	2.70%	9,555	44.66%	21,395	40.61%
Sausalito	Marin	2,825	70.77%	1,097	27.48%	70	1.75%	1,728	43.29%	3,992	42.08%
Tiburon	Marin	2,702	60.19%	1,727	38.47%	60	1.34%	975	21.72%	4,489	44.34%
Unincorporated Area	Marin	22,707	71.35%	8,357	26.26%	761	2.39%	14,350	45.09%	31,825	40.38%
Multiple Districts	Marin	93	82.30%	18	15.93%	2	1.77%	75	66.37%	113	N/A
Unincorporated Area	Mariposa	3,077	37.38%	4,513	54.83%	641	7.79%	-1,436	-17.45%	8,231	23.23%
Fort Bragg	Mendocino	1,385	67.20%	540	26.20%	136	6.60%	845	41.00%	2,061	33.22%
Point Arena	Mendocino	116	78.38%	26	17.57%	6	4.05%	90	60.81%	148	43.33%
Ukiah	Mendocino	2,802	60.65%	1,481	32.06%	337	7.29%	1,321	28.59%	4,620	32.82%
Willits	Mendocino	885	62.41%	402	28.35%	131	9.24%	483	34.06%	1,418	33.91%
Unincorporated Area	Mendocino	14,998	63.42%	7,075	29.92%	1,577	6.67%	7,923	33.50%	23,650	34.47%
Atwater	Merced	2,401	43.81%	2,726	49.74%	354	6.46%	-325	-5.93%	5,481	27.09%
Dos Palos	Merced	384	40.98%	496	52.93%	57	6.08%	-112	-11.95%	937	20.68%
Gustine	Merced	575	47.64%	571	47.31%	61	5.05%	4	0.33%	1,207	29.05%
Livingston	Merced	1,395	73.27%	386	20.27%	123	6.46%	1,009	52.99%	1,904	28.29%
Los Banos	Merced	3,472	52.55%	2,666	40.35%	469	7.10%	806	12.20%	6,607	30.06%
Merced	Merced	7,300	49.95%	6,398	43.78%	916	6.27%	902	6.17%	14,614	29.44%
Unincorporated Area	Merced	6,360	37.23%	9,778	57.24%	944	5.53%	-3,418	-20.01%	17,082	21.50%
Alturas	Modoc	324	32.40%	548	54.80%	128	12.80%	-224	-22.40%	1,000	23.10%
Unincorporated Area	Modoc	677	24.45%	1,896	68.47%	196	7.08%	-1,219	-44.02%	2,769	15.87%
Mammoth Lakes	Mono	1,013	51.74%	813	41.52%	132	6.74%	200	10.21%	1,958	33.18%
Unincorporated Area	Mono	1,015	41.56%	1,266	51.84%	161	6.59%	-251	-10.28%	2,442	25.93%
Carmel-by-the-Sea	Monterey	1,141	53.80%	920	43.38%	60	2.83%	221	10.42%	2,121	43.55%
Del Rey Oaks	Monterey	429	60.76%	255	36.12%	22	3.12%	174	24.65%	706	45.56%
Gonzales	Monterey	957	72.61%	279	21.17%	82	6.22%	678	51.44%	1,318	30.92%
Greenfield	Monterey	1,667	77.00%	362	16.72%	136	6.28%	1,305	60.28%	2,165	21.11%
King City	Monterey	938	63.34%	466	31.47%	77	5.20%	472	31.87%	1,481	34.24%
Marina	Monterey	3,006	61.45%	1,618	33.07%	268	5.48%	1,388	28.37%	4,892	42.15%
Monterey	Monterey	5,558	62.48%	2,965	33.33%	372	4.18%	2,593	29.15%	8,895	41.60%
Pacific Grove	Monterey	4,470	65.83%	2,074	30.54%	246	3.62%	2,396	35.29%	6,790	42.32%
Salinas	Monterey	17,332	64.77%	7,858	29.37%	1,568	5.86%	9,474	35.41%	26,758	34.44%
Sand City	Monterey	53	60.92%	32	36.78%	2	2.30%	21	24.14%	87	59.28%
Seaside	Monterey	4,121	66.96%	1,672	27.17%	361	5.87%	2,449	39.80%	6,154	38.77%
Soledad	Monterey	2,043	78.88%	409	15.79%	138	5.33%	1,634	63.09%	2,590	28.77%
Unincorporated Area	Monterey	18,300	50.92%	16,209	45.10%	1,429	3.98%	2,091	5.82%	35,938	35.74%
American Canyon	Napa	3,175	65.64%	1,421	29.38%	241	4.98%	1,754	36.26%	4,837	33.38%
Calistoga	Napa	1,025	64.14%	492	30.79%	81	5.07%	533	33.35%	1,598	38.82%
Napa	Napa	14,775	58.61%	9,156	36.32%	1,277	5.07%	5,619	22.29%	25,208	33.79%
St. Helena	Napa	1,351	57.74%	918	39.23%	71	3.03%	433	18.50%	2,340	37.39%
Yountville	Napa	931	60.26%	531	34.37%	83	5.37%	400	25.89%	1,545	34.28%
Unincorporated Area	Napa	5,509	48.41%	5,355	47.06%	516	4.53%	154	1.35%	11,380	35.08%
Grass Valley	Nevada	2,231	51.23%	1,864	42.80%	260	5.97%	367	8.43%	4,355	35.92%
Nevada City	Nevada	1,003	66.34%	439	29.03%	70	4.63%	564	37.30%	1,512	45.18%
Truckee	Nevada	3,083	54.44%	2,261	39.93%	319	5.63%	822	14.52%	5,663	38.81%
Unincorporated Area	Nevada	14,423	42.26%	17,981	52.69%	1,723	5.05%	-3,558	-10.43%	34,127	33.33%
Aliso Viejo	Orange	5,363	37.53%	8,067	56.45%	861	6.02%	-2,704	-18.92%	14,291	27.00%
Anaheim	Orange	29,395	42.74%	34,529	50.21%	4,851	7.05%	-5,134	-7.46%	68,775	26.82%
Brea	Orange	4,546	32.31%	8,698	61.82%	827	5.88%	-4,152	-29.51%	14,071	23.39%
Buena Park	Orange	8,044	45.37%	8,476	47.81%	1,209	6.82%	-432	-2.44%	17,729	26.62%
Costa Mesa	Orange	11,389	39.02%	15,715	53.84%	2,083	7.14%	-4,326	-14.82%	29,187	24.83%
Cypress	Orange	6,129	38.57%	8,836	55.61%	925	5.82%	-2,707	-17.04%	15,890	24.58%
Dana Point	Orange	4,808	33.98%	8,555	60.46%	787	5.56%	-3,747	-26.48%	14,150	25.71%
Fountain Valley	Orange	6,960	33.23%	12,816	61.19%	1,170	5.59%	-5,856	-27.96%	20,946	23.98%
Fullerton	Orange	14,349	38.90%	20,155	54.64%	2,382	6.46%	-5,806	-15.74%	36,886	24.12%
Garden Grove	Orange	16,601	42.65%	19,682	50.57%	2,640	6.78%	-3,081	-7.92%	38,923	32.07%
Huntington Beach	Orange	24,769	34.10%	43,552	59.95%	4,326	5.95%	-18,783	-25.86%	72,647	21.60%
Irvine	Orange	25,659	43.19%	30,915	52.04%	2,835	4.77%	-5,256	-8.85%	59,409	29.13%
La Habra	Orange	5,750	41.25%	7,176	51.48%	1,013	7.27%	-1,426	-10.23%	13,939	24.27%
La Palma	Orange	2,109	41.90%	2,672	53.08%	253	5.03%	-563	-11.18%	5,034	25.65%
Laguna Beach	Orange	5,707	50.17%	5,259	46.23%	410	3.60%	448	3.94%	11,376	31.02%
Laguna Hills	Orange	3,703	32.48%	6,975	61.18%	722	6.33%	-3,272	-28.70%	11,400	25.00%
Laguna Niguel	Orange	8,450	32.94%	16,007	62.41%	1,193	4.65%	-7,557	-29.46%	25,650	23.62%
Laguna Woods	Orange	4,849	46.98%	5,096	49.38%	376	3.64%	-247	-2.39%	10,321	20.50%
Lake Forest	Orange	8,048	31.61%	15,745	61.84%	1,667	6.55%	-7,697	-30.23%	25,460	23.84%
Los Alamitos	Orange	1,607	40.99%	2,077	52.98%	236	6.02%	-470	-11.99%	3,920	26.40%
Mission Viejo	Orange	11,727	31.11%	23,818	63.19%	2,148	5.70%	-12,091	-32.08%	37,693	22.48%
Newport Beach	Orange	10,546	27.26%	26,983	69.75%	1,159	3.00%	-16,437	-42.49%	38,688	21.24%
Orange	Orange	13,839	34.19%	24,103	59.55%	2,535	6.26%	-10,264	-25.36%	40,477	24.61%
Placentia	Orange	5,344	33.50%	9,681	60.68%	929	5.82%	-4,337	-27.18%	15,954	21.73%
Rancho Santa Margarita	Orange	4,701	28.98%	10,550	65.03%	972	5.99%	-5,849	-36.05%	16,223	22.44%
San Clemente	Orange	7,829	31.00%	16,243	64.33%	1,179	4.67%	-8,414	-33.32%	25,251	23.47%
San Juan Capistrano	Orange	3,838	31.42%	7,681	62.88%	696	5.70%	-3,843	-31.46%	12,215	24.19%
Santa Ana	Orange	27,616	59.17%	15,471	33.15%	3,585	7.68%	12,145	26.02%	46,672	26.56%
Seal Beach	Orange	5,018	39.76%	6,999	55.46%	603	4.78%	-1,981	-15.70%	12,620	21.85%
Stanton	Orange	3,052	47.49%	2,837	44.14%	538	8.37%	215	3.35%	6,427	32.24%
Tustin	Orange	6,838	38.53%	9,770	55.05%	1,140	6.42%	-2,932	-16.52%	17,748	26.98%
Villa Park	Orange	658	19.87%	2,552	77.05%	102	3.08%	-1,894	-57.19%	3,312	16.81%
Westminster	Orange	9,356	39.75%	12,705	53.98%	1,476	6.27%	-3,349	-14.23%	23,537	33.59%
Yorba Linda	Orange	6,889	24.52%	19,832	70.59%	1,373	4.89%	-12,943	-46.07%	28,094	17.56%
Unincorporated Area	Orange	13,177	29.27%	29,650	65.87%	2,186	4.86%	-16,473	-36.60%	45,013	20.39%
Auburn	Placer	2,723	44.09%	3,117	50.47%	336	5.44%	-394	-6.38%	6,176	35.93%
Colfax	Placer	260	42.07%	287	46.44%	71	11.49%	-27	-4.37%	618	33.30%
Lincoln	Placer	6,931	38.45%	10,355	57.44%	741	4.11%	-3,424	-18.99%	18,027	35.97%
Loomis	Placer	989	33.70%	1,753	59.73%	193	6.58%	-764	-26.03%	2,935	35.03%
Rocklin	Placer	7,931	37.71%	12,059	57.34%	1,039	4.94%	-4,128	-19.63%	21,029	34.28%
Roseville	Placer	17,792	40.55%	24,125	54.98%	1,959	4.46%	-6,333	-14.43%	43,876	36.50%
Unincorporated Area	Placer	17,950	35.77%	29,714	59.21%	2,516	5.01%	-11,764	-23.44%	50,180	30.71%
Portola	Plumas	260	39.57%	333	50.68%	64	9.74%	-73	-11.11%	657	27.33%
Unincorporated Area	Plumas	3,184	37.26%	4,835	56.58%	527	6.17%	-1,651	-19.32%	8,546	25.98%
Banning	Riverside	3,498	42.12%	4,219	50.81%	587	7.07%	-721	-8.68%	8,304	29.12%
Beaumont	Riverside	3,413	40.20%	4,484	52.82%	593	6.98%	-1,071	-12.61%	8,490	27.03%
Blythe	Riverside	1,739	62.00%	881	31.41%	185	6.60%	858	30.59%	2,805	34.63%
Calimesa	Riverside	919	32.61%	1,635	58.02%	264	9.37%	-716	-25.41%	2,818	24.75%
Canyon Lake	Riverside	1,000	24.71%	2,829	69.90%	218	5.39%	-1,829	-45.19%	4,047	21.21%
Cathedral City	Riverside	5,475	53.99%	4,102	40.45%	563	5.55%	1,373	13.54%	10,140	30.76%
Coachella	Riverside	2,806	77.43%	530	14.62%	288	7.95%	2,276	62.80%	3,624	19.42%
Corona	Riverside	13,285	40.21%	17,573	53.20%	2,177	6.59%	-4,288	-12.98%	33,035	26.27%
Desert Hot Springs	Riverside	2,044	51.53%	1,657	41.77%	266	6.71%	387	9.76%	3,967	37.55%
Eastvale	Riverside	4,222	48.43%	4,012	46.03%	483	5.54%	210	2.41%	8,717	N/A (Note: City not incorporated until after 2006 election)
Hemet	Riverside	7,235	37.90%	10,213	53.50%	1,642	8.60%	-2,978	-15.60%	19,090	24.90%
Indian Wells	Riverside	567	23.89%	1,764	74.34%	42	1.77%	-1,197	-50.44%	2,373	21.94%
Indio	Riverside	6,854	48.50%	6,578	46.55%	700	4.95%	276	1.95%	14,132	22.74%
La Quinta	Riverside	4,119	33.52%	7,699	62.65%	470	3.82%	-3,580	-29.13%	12,288	26.34%
Lake Elsinore	Riverside	3,619	41.73%	4,314	49.74%	740	8.53%	-695	-8.01%	8,673	26.69%
Indio	Riverside	7,538	35.16%	12,231	57.05%	1,671	7.79%	-4,693	-21.89%	21,440	N/A
Moreno Valley	Riverside	19,145	58.20%	11,567	35.16%	2,184	6.64%	7,578	23.04%	32,896	29.94%
Murrieta	Riverside	8,544	31.84%	16,493	61.47%	1,793	6.68%	-7,949	-29.63%	26,830	25.04%
Norco	Riverside	2,100	29.76%	4,499	63.75%	458	6.49%	-2,399	-33.99%	7,057	22.49%
Palm Desert	Riverside	6,043	36.79%	9,839	59.90%	543	3.31%	-3,796	-23.11%	16,425	28.02%
Palm Springs	Riverside	9,848	61.98%	5,518	34.73%	523	3.29%	4,330	27.25%	15,889	38.37%
Perris	Riverside	4,755	65.32%	1,911	26.25%	614	8.43%	2,844	39.07%	7,280	31.28%
Rancho Mirage	Riverside	2,870	39.39%	4,269	58.58%	148	2.03%	-1,399	-19.20%	7,287	29.08%
Riverside	Riverside	31,925	49.54%	28,034	43.50%	4,485	6.96%	3,891	6.04%	64,444	30.45%
San Jacinto	Riverside	3,323	44.09%	3,493	46.34%	721	9.57%	-170	-2.26%	7,537	28.49%
Temecula	Riverside	7,956	30.87%	16,088	62.41%	1,732	6.72%	-8,132	-31.55%	25,776	24.10%
Wildomar	Riverside	2,601	32.33%	4,757	59.12%	688	8.55%	-2,156	-26.80%	8,046	N/A
Unincorporated Area	Riverside	38,955	38.97%	53,470	53.49%	7,540	7.54%	-14,515	-14.52%	99,965	26.37%
Citrus Heights	Sacramento	12,119	45.52%	12,779	48.00%	1,726	6.48%	-660	-2.48%	26,624	41.84%
Elk Grove	Sacramento	26,876	57.53%	17,969	38.47%	1,868	4.00%	8,907	19.07%	46,713	48.31%
Folsom	Sacramento	10,115	40.46%	13,900	55.60%	986	3.94%	-3,785	-15.14%	25,001	38.92%
Galt	Sacramento	2,864	47.15%	2,793	45.98%	417	6.87%	71	1.17%	6,074	38.97%
Isleton	Sacramento	141	62.67%	66	29.33%	18	8.00%	75	33.33%	225	50.12%
Rancho Cordova	Sacramento	9,537	54.97%	6,730	38.79%	1,083	6.24%	2,807	16.18%	17,350	46.78%
Sacramento	Sacramento	89,540	70.33%	32,274	25.35%	5,509	4.33%	57,266	44.98%	127,323	46.25%
Unincorporated Area	Sacramento	88,407	51.10%	75,858	43.85%	8,731	5.05%	12,549	7.25%	172,996	43.23%
Hollister	San Benito	4,970	58.80%	3,002	35.52%	480	5.68%	1,968	23.28%	8,452	27.54%
San Juan Bautista	San Benito	389	62.14%	212	33.87%	25	3.99%	177	28.27%	626	28.83%
Unincorporated Area	San Benito	2,945	41.84%	3,779	53.69%	315	4.48%	-834	-11.85%	7,039	27.78%
Adelanto	San Bernardino	1,739	54.75%	1,078	33.94%	359	11.30%	661	20.81%	3,176	27.71%
Apple Valley	San Bernardino	6,237	30.72%	12,279	60.49%	1,784	8.79%	-6,042	-29.76%	20,300	21.17%
Barstow	San Bernardino	1,880	45.55%	1,785	43.25%	462	11.19%	95	2.30%	4,127	24.34%
Big Bear Lake	San Bernardino	582	28.02%	1,356	65.29%	139	6.69%	-774	-37.27%	2,077	24.86%
Chino	San Bernardino	7,556	44.81%	8,122	48.16%	1,185	7.03%	-566	-3.36%	16,863	21.63%
Chino Hills	San Bernardino	8,771	39.76%	12,020	54.49%	1,267	5.74%	-3,249	-14.73%	22,058	23.25%
Colton	San Bernardino	5,551	63.75%	2,454	28.18%	702	8.06%	3,097	35.57%	8,707	24.99%
Fontana	San Bernardino	18,868	60.72%	9,922	31.93%	2,286	7.36%	8,946	28.79%	31,076	29.10%
Grand Terrace	San Bernardino	1,664	42.99%	1,867	48.23%	340	8.78%	-203	-5.24%	3,871	31.19%
Hesperia	San Bernardino	6,253	35.62%	9,419	53.65%	1,883	10.73%	-3,166	-18.03%	17,555	24.42%
Highland	San Bernardino	5,746	48.31%	5,191	43.64%	958	8.05%	555	4.67%	11,895	31.21%
Loma Linda	San Bernardino	2,119	42.36%	2,549	50.96%	334	6.68%	-430	-8.60%	5,002	30.61%
Montclair	San Bernardino	3,549	59.53%	1,943	32.59%	470	7.88%	1,606	26.94%	5,962	28.92%
Needles	San Bernardino	536	47.64%	489	43.47%	100	8.89%	47	4.18%	1,125	21.63%
Ontario	San Bernardino	15,031	54.93%	10,177	37.19%	2,156	7.88%	4,854	17.74%	27,364	27.22%
Rancho Cucamonga	San Bernardino	19,542	42.04%	23,661	50.90%	3,278	7.05%	-4,119	-8.86%	46,481	27.88%
Redlands	San Bernardino	9,762	42.67%	11,635	50.85%	1,483	6.48%	-1,873	-8.19%	22,880	28.76%
Rialto	San Bernardino	10,473	66.39%	4,035	25.58%	1,266	8.03%	6,438	40.81%	15,774	29.06%
San Bernardino	San Bernardino	19,302	59.26%	10,638	32.66%	2,629	8.07%	8,664	26.60%	32,569	31.56%
Twentynine Palms	San Bernardino	1,052	35.31%	1,604	53.84%	323	10.84%	-552	-18.53%	2,979	31.21%
Upland	San Bernardino	9,207	41.24%	11,708	52.44%	1,412	6.32%	-2,501	-11.20%	22,327	28.67%
Victorville	San Bernardino	8,747	47.18%	8,106	43.72%	1,688	9.10%	641	3.46%	18,541	29.01%
Yucaipa	San Bernardino	5,284	33.37%	9,144	57.75%	1,405	8.87%	-3,860	-24.38%	15,833	23.10%
Yucca Valley	San Bernardino	2,002	32.97%	3,504	57.71%	566	9.32%	-1,502	-24.74%	6,072	26.63%
Unincorporated Area	San Bernardino	26,125	37.01%	37,531	53.17%	6,930	9.82%	-11,406	-16.16%	70,586	24.26%
Carlsbad	San Diego	16,126	37.09%	25,341	58.28%	2,012	4.63%	-9,215	-21.19%	43,479	26.62%
Chula Vista	San Diego	28,460	51.02%	23,369	41.89%	3,957	7.09%	5,091	9.13%	55,786	29.21%
Coronado	San Diego	2,331	32.32%	4,607	63.87%	275	3.81%	-2,276	-31.55%	7,213	25.81%
Del Mar	San Diego	1,096	48.11%	1,133	49.74%	49	2.15%	-37	-1.62%	2,278	30.02%
El Cajon	San Diego	8,272	37.43%	12,127	54.87%	1,701	7.70%	-3,855	-17.44%	22,100	27.43%
Encinitas	San Diego	13,065	48.45%	12,696	47.08%	1,205	4.47%	369	1.37%	26,966	32.21%
Escondido	San Diego	11,914	35.46%	19,141	56.98%	2,540	7.56%	-7,227	-21.51%	33,595	28.09%
Imperial Beach	San Diego	2,580	47.76%	2,252	41.69%	570	10.55%	328	6.07%	5,402	33.84%
La Mesa	San Diego	9,086	46.83%	9,037	46.58%	1,279	6.59%	49	0.25%	19,402	30.52%
Lemon Grove	San Diego	3,373	50.49%	2,707	40.52%	600	8.98%	666	9.97%	6,680	33.50%
National City	San Diego	5,186	59.82%	2,614	30.15%	870	10.03%	2,572	29.67%	8,670	23.96%
Oceanside	San Diego	19,821	41.04%	24,830	51.41%	3,646	7.55%	-5,009	-10.37%	48,297	31.00%
Poway	San Diego	6,119	31.28%	12,445	63.63%	995	5.09%	-6,326	-32.34%	19,559	26.14%
San Diego	San Diego	197,658	51.89%	161,795	42.47%	21,483	5.64%	35,863	9.41%	380,936	32.64%
San Marcos	San Diego	8,075	36.25%	12,727	57.14%	1,472	6.61%	-4,652	-20.89%	22,274	25.95%
Santee	San Diego	6,345	33.15%	11,290	58.99%	1,505	7.86%	-4,945	-25.84%	19,140	27.85%
Solana Beach	San Diego	2,660	44.14%	3,165	52.52%	201	3.34%	-505	-8.38%	6,026	30.33%
Vista	San Diego	7,840	37.28%	11,384	54.13%	1,808	8.60%	-3,544	-16.85%	21,032	27.86%
Unincorporated Area	San Diego	49,838	31.32%	99,545	62.56%	9,727	6.11%	-49,707	-31.24%	159,110	23.70%
San Francisco	San Francisco	219,330	78.85%	49,151	17.67%	9,674	3.48%	170,179	61.18%	278,155	28.20%
Escalon	San Joaquin	852	36.77%	1,310	56.54%	155	6.69%	-458	-19.77%	2,317	29.63%
Lathrop	San Joaquin	1,822	57.66%	1,113	35.22%	225	7.12%	709	22.44%	3,160	23.84%
Lodi	San Joaquin	6,866	37.95%	10,176	56.25%	1,050	5.80%	-3,310	-18.30%	18,092	28.58%
Manteca	San Joaquin	7,755	46.83%	7,717	46.60%	1,087	6.56%	38	0.23%	16,559	27.33%
Ripon	San Joaquin	1,477	27.98%	3,439	65.16%	362	6.86%	-1,962	-37.17%	5,278	22.90%
Stockton	San Joaquin	34,213	59.28%	20,361	35.28%	3,137	5.44%	13,852	24.00%	57,711	29.37%
Tracy	San Joaquin	9,887	53.54%	7,570	41.00%	1,008	5.46%	2,317	12.55%	18,465	29.91%
Unincorporated Area	San Joaquin	14,751	39.56%	20,313	54.48%	2,220	5.95%	-5,562	-14.92%	37,284	24.96%
Arroyo Grande	San Luis Obispo	3,306	41.45%	4,256	53.36%	414	5.19%	-950	-11.91%	7,976	23.33%
Atascadero	San Luis Obispo	4,879	43.24%	5,743	50.90%	662	5.87%	-864	-7.66%	11,284	30.55%
El Paso de Robles	San Luis Obispo	3,866	39.38%	5,413	55.13%	539	5.49%	-1,547	-15.76%	9,818	27.53%
Grover Beach	San Luis Obispo	1,970	48.20%	1,823	44.60%	294	7.19%	147	3.60%	4,087	28.97%
Morro Bay	San Luis Obispo	2,685	54.00%	2,006	40.35%	281	5.65%	679	13.66%	4,972	33.56%
Pismo Beach	San Luis Obispo	1,688	43.15%	2,050	52.40%	174	4.45%	-362	-9.25%	3,912	28.50%
San Luis Obispo	San Luis Obispo	9,923	58.73%	5,935	35.13%	1,037	6.14%	3,988	23.60%	16,895	33.86%
Unincorporated Area	San Luis Obispo	19,346	41.42%	24,830	53.16%	2,531	5.42%	-5,484	-11.74%	46,707	25.58%
Atherton	San Mateo	1,399	38.68%	2,166	59.88%	52	1.44%	-767	-21.21%	3,617	34.64%
Belmont	San Mateo	6,511	64.03%	3,310	32.55%	347	3.41%	3,201	31.48%	10,168	38.09%
Brisbane	San Mateo	1,177	74.21%	344	21.69%	65	4.10%	833	52.52%	1,586	31.34%
Burlingame	San Mateo	6,341	61.78%	3,627	35.34%	296	2.88%	2,714	26.44%	10,264	34.50%
Colma	San Mateo	253	73.76%	78	22.74%	12	3.50%	175	51.02%	343	14.80%
Daly City	San Mateo	14,153	72.83%	4,622	23.79%	657	3.38%	9,531	49.05%	19,432	24.79%
East Palo Alto	San Mateo	2,986	86.20%	311	8.98%	167	4.82%	2,675	77.22%	3,464	23.11%
Foster City	San Mateo	5,975	62.05%	3,406	35.37%	249	2.59%	2,569	26.68%	9,630	39.25%
Half Moon Bay	San Mateo	2,900	63.44%	1,512	33.08%	159	3.48%	1,388	30.37%	4,571	36.34%
Hillsborough	San Mateo	1,997	39.98%	2,950	59.06%	48	0.96%	-953	-19.08%	4,995	34.54%
Menlo Park	San Mateo	8,185	65.43%	4,012	32.07%	312	2.49%	4,173	33.36%	12,509	40.78%
Millbrae	San Mateo	4,275	60.72%	2,535	36.01%	230	3.27%	1,740	24.72%	7,040	30.96%
Pacifica	San Mateo	10,355	71.18%	3,670	25.23%	522	3.59%	6,685	45.95%	14,547	32.44%
Portola Valley	San Mateo	1,459	58.10%	1,005	40.02%	47	1.87%	454	18.08%	2,511	54.48%
Redwood City	San Mateo	14,552	65.50%	6,865	30.90%	799	3.60%	7,687	34.60%	22,216	36.02%
San Bruno	San Mateo	8,061	70.04%	3,050	26.50%	398	3.46%	5,011	43.54%	11,509	31.71%
San Carlos	San Mateo	7,989	62.15%	4,521	35.17%	344	2.68%	3,468	26.98%	12,854	39.51%
San Mateo	San Mateo	19,787	65.44%	9,454	31.27%	996	3.29%	10,333	34.17%	30,237	35.75%
South San Francisco	San Mateo	10,879	71.82%	3,677	24.27%	592	3.91%	7,202	47.54%	15,148	26.50%
Woodside	San Mateo	1,387	48.82%	1,393	49.03%	61	2.15%	-6	-0.21%	2,841	36.91%
Unincorporated Area	San Mateo	15,349	67.44%	6,704	29.46%	707	3.11%	8,645	37.98%	22,760	38.07%
Buellton	Santa Barbara	674	36.75%	1,035	56.43%	125	6.82%	-361	-19.68%	1,834	21.55%
Carpinteria	Santa Barbara	2,539	54.94%	1,840	39.82%	242	5.24%	699	15.13%	4,621	29.25%
Goleta	Santa Barbara	5,899	53.02%	4,623	41.55%	605	5.44%	1,276	11.47%	11,127	31.53%
Guadalupe	Santa Barbara	668	66.60%	259	25.82%	76	7.58%	409	40.78%	1,003	25.39%
Lompoc	Santa Barbara	3,738	41.21%	4,522	49.85%	811	8.94%	-784	-8.64%	9,071	23.18%
Santa Barbara	Santa Barbara	19,607	63.30%	10,102	32.61%	1,267	4.09%	9,505	30.69%	30,976	37.47%
Santa Maria	Santa Barbara	7,100	43.74%	8,005	49.31%	1,129	6.95%	-905	-5.57%	16,234	21.94%
Solvang	Santa Barbara	766	33.52%	1,423	62.28%	96	4.20%	-657	-28.75%	2,285	21.09%
Unincorporated Area	Santa Barbara	24,020	44.11%	27,806	51.06%	2,633	4.83%	-3,786	-6.95%	54,459	28.27%
Campbell	Santa Clara	8,049	59.67%	4,774	35.39%	666	4.94%	3,275	24.28%	13,489	37.43%
Cupertino	Santa Clara	10,724	58.72%	7,033	38.51%	505	2.77%	3,691	20.21%	18,262	38.67%
Gilroy	Santa Clara	6,931	58.23%	4,418	37.12%	554	4.65%	2,513	21.11%	11,903	25.93%
Los Altos	Santa Clara	8,510	57.84%	5,855	39.80%	347	2.36%	2,655	18.05%	14,712	46.00%
Los Altos Hills	Santa Clara	2,100	48.42%	2,159	49.78%	78	1.80%	-59	-1.36%	4,337	44.51%
Los Gatos	Santa Clara	7,334	54.31%	5,800	42.95%	369	2.73%	1,534	11.36%	13,503	40.93%
Milpitas	Santa Clara	9,153	59.64%	5,634	36.71%	560	3.65%	3,519	22.93%	15,347	30.75%
Monte Sereno	Santa Clara	867	46.22%	981	52.29%	28	1.49%	-114	-6.08%	1,876	36.87%
Morgan Hill	Santa Clara	6,510	51.83%	5,597	44.56%	453	3.61%	913	7.27%	12,560	31.84%
Mountain View	Santa Clara	16,273	70.07%	6,088	26.22%	862	3.71%	10,185	43.86%	23,223	40.52%
Palo Alto	Santa Clara	20,240	72.17%	7,216	25.73%	590	2.10%	13,024	46.44%	28,046	37.56%
San Jose	Santa Clara	150,995	61.71%	83,488	34.12%	10,207	4.17%	67,507	27.59%	244,690	34.00%
Santa Clara	Santa Clara	19,183	63.57%	9,572	31.72%	1,419	4.70%	9,611	31.85%	30,174	34.59%
Saratoga	Santa Clara	6,943	48.02%	7,179	49.65%	336	2.32%	-236	-1.63%	14,458	37.10%
Sunnyvale	Santa Clara	23,814	63.56%	12,108	32.31%	1,547	4.13%	11,706	31.24%	37,469	39.71%
Unincorporated Area	Santa Clara	16,396	57.93%	10,793	38.14%	1,113	3.93%	5,603	19.80%	28,302	34.06%
Capitola	Santa Cruz	2,740	69.90%	965	24.62%	215	5.48%	1,775	45.28%	3,920	41.04%
Santa Cruz	Santa Cruz	18,655	79.37%	3,618	15.39%	1,231	5.24%	15,037	63.98%	23,504	35.62%
Scotts Valley	Santa Cruz	2,831	56.23%	1,990	39.52%	214	4.25%	841	16.70%	5,035	43.94%
Watsonville	Santa Cruz	6,063	72.79%	1,838	22.07%	428	5.14%	4,225	50.73%	8,329	31.88%
Unincorporated Area	Santa Cruz	36,818	66.39%	15,979	28.81%	2,664	4.80%	20,839	37.57%	55,461	39.48%
Anderson	Shasta	884	35.35%	1,336	53.42%	281	11.24%	-452	-18.07%	2,501	24.71%
Redding	Shasta	10,354	33.04%	18,821	60.06%	2,160	6.89%	-8,467	-27.02%	31,335	24.16%
Shasta Lake	Shasta	1,082	34.56%	1,751	55.92%	298	9.52%	-669	-21.37%	3,131	22.78%
Unincorporated Area	Shasta	8,477	29.94%	17,794	62.86%	2,038	7.20%	-9,317	-32.91%	28,309	23.30%
Loyalton	Sierra	113	31.92%	206	58.19%	35	9.89%	-93	-26.27%	354	11.75%
Unincorporated Area	Sierra	522	35.44%	836	56.75%	115	7.81%	-314	-21.32%	1,473	29.80%
Dorris	Siskiyou	73	30.67%	144	60.50%	21	8.82%	-71	-29.83%	238	26.19%
Dunsmuir	Siskiyou	390	52.56%	286	38.54%	66	8.89%	104	14.02%	742	16.70%
Etna	Siskiyou	123	36.83%	196	58.68%	15	4.49%	-73	-21.86%	334	27.32%
Fort Jones	Siskiyou	79	31.35%	167	66.27%	6	2.38%	-88	-34.92%	252	19.91%
Montague	Siskiyou	128	27.41%	297	63.60%	42	8.99%	-169	-36.19%	467	22.47%
Mt. Shasta	Siskiyou	836	59.38%	468	33.24%	104	7.39%	368	26.14%	1,408	32.42%
Tulelake	Siskiyou	49	27.07%	114	62.98%	18	9.94%	-65	-35.91%	181	14.09%
Weed	Siskiyou	404	51.66%	302	38.62%	76	9.72%	102	13.04%	782	21.74%
Yreka	Siskiyou	991	35.89%	1,556	56.36%	214	7.75%	-565	-20.46%	2,761	20.66%
Unincorporated Area	Siskiyou	4,201	37.47%	6,309	56.27%	703	6.27%	-2,108	-18.80%	11,213	24.35%
Benicia	Solano	7,272	59.96%	4,348	35.85%	508	4.19%	2,924	24.11%	12,128	35.62%
Dixon	Solano	2,633	48.66%	2,465	45.56%	313	5.78%	168	3.10%	5,411	36.37%
Fairfield	Solano	14,993	58.07%	9,576	37.09%	1,249	4.84%	5,417	20.98%	25,818	34.22%
Rio Vista	Solano	1,800	50.96%	1,603	45.39%	129	3.65%	197	5.58%	3,532	40.87%
Suisun City	Solano	4,338	64.09%	2,094	30.94%	337	4.98%	2,244	33.15%	6,769	33.29%
Vacaville	Solano	13,683	50.23%	12,131	44.54%	1,425	5.23%	1,552	5.70%	27,239	33.63%
Vallejo	Solano	22,057	72.74%	7,075	23.33%	1,192	3.93%	14,982	49.41%	30,324	32.35%
Unincorporated Area	Solano	2,821	39.35%	4,031	56.23%	317	4.42%	-1,210	-16.88%	7,169	27.97%
Cloverdale	Sonoma	1,797	57.99%	1,097	35.40%	205	6.62%	700	22.59%	3,099	33.27%
Cotati	Sonoma	1,919	67.38%	761	26.72%	168	5.90%	1,158	40.66%	2,848	31.75%
Healdsburg	Sonoma	3,065	66.14%	1,368	29.52%	201	4.34%	1,697	36.62%	4,634	40.13%
Petaluma	Sonoma	15,392	65.79%	6,852	29.29%	1,152	4.92%	8,540	36.50%	23,396	38.18%
Rohnert Park	Sonoma	8,038	62.21%	4,051	31.35%	831	6.43%	3,987	30.86%	12,920	32.33%
Santa Rosa	Sonoma	36,627	64.63%	17,036	30.06%	3,008	5.31%	19,591	34.57%	56,671	37.16%
Sebastopol	Sonoma	2,997	80.20%	586	15.68%	154	4.12%	2,411	64.52%	3,737	39.78%
Sonoma	Sonoma	3,366	66.50%	1,516	29.95%	180	3.56%	1,850	36.55%	5,062	44.00%
Windsor	Sonoma	5,205	55.21%	3,703	39.28%	519	5.51%	1,502	15.93%	9,427	31.61%
Unincorporated Area	Sonoma	40,673	65.33%	18,502	29.72%	3,081	4.95%	22,171	35.61%	62,256	37.61%
Ceres	Stanislaus	4,082	50.95%	3,386	42.27%	543	6.78%	696	8.69%	8,011	28.07%
Hughson	Stanislaus	693	37.79%	1,017	55.45%	124	6.76%	-324	-17.67%	1,834	24.47%
Modesto	Stanislaus	23,862	46.79%	23,876	46.82%	3,261	6.39%	-14	-0.03%	50,999	29.34%
Newman	Stanislaus	906	48.19%	822	43.72%	152	8.09%	84	4.47%	1,880	24.85%
Oakdale	Stanislaus	2,083	36.24%	3,203	55.73%	461	8.02%	-1,120	-19.49%	5,747	24.76%
Patterson	Stanislaus	2,074	56.40%	1,357	36.91%	246	6.69%	717	19.50%	3,677	26.83%
Riverbank	Stanislaus	2,184	46.89%	2,126	45.64%	348	7.47%	58	1.25%	4,658	25.43%
Turlock	Stanislaus	6,669	41.29%	8,607	53.29%	876	5.42%	-1,938	-12.00%	16,152	25.18%
Waterford	Stanislaus	711	39.81%	925	51.79%	150	8.40%	-214	-11.98%	1,786	24.78%
Unincorporated Area	Stanislaus	9,246	36.14%	14,765	57.71%	1,574	6.15%	-5,519	-21.57%	25,585	23.03%
Live Oak	Sutter	780	51.35%	606	39.89%	133	8.76%	174	11.45%	1,519	26.29%
Yuba City	Sutter	6,604	40.88%	8,498	52.60%	1,054	6.52%	-1,894	-11.72%	16,156	34.30%
Unincorporated Area	Sutter	2,230	28.15%	5,242	66.17%	450	5.68%	-3,012	-38.02%	7,922	25.73%
Corning	Tehama	552	35.75%	809	52.40%	183	11.85%	-257	-16.65%	1,544	25.32%
Red Bluff	Tehama	1,402	39.82%	1,793	50.92%	326	9.26%	-391	-11.10%	3,521	30.61%
Tehama	Tehama	54	34.84%	87	56.13%	14	9.03%	-33	-21.29%	155	38.98%
Unincorporated Area	Tehama	4,534	30.31%	9,246	61.80%	1,180	7.89%	-4,712	-31.50%	14,960	26.90%
Unincorporated Area	Trinity	2,463	44.23%	2,569	46.13%	537	9.64%	-106	-1.90%	5,569	35.40%
Dinuba	Tulare	1,457	49.49%	1,293	43.92%	194	6.59%	164	5.57%	2,944	26.51%
Exeter	Tulare	729	29.76%	1,576	64.33%	145	5.92%	-847	-34.57%	2,450	21.90%
Farmersville	Tulare	569	58.18%	322	32.92%	87	8.90%	247	25.26%	978	38.90%
Lindsay	Tulare	608	56.88%	375	35.08%	86	8.04%	233	21.80%	1,069	31.44%
Porterville	Tulare	3,995	47.39%	3,912	46.41%	523	6.20%	83	0.98%	8,430	32.80%
Tulare	Tulare	4,089	39.47%	5,653	54.57%	618	5.97%	-1,564	-15.10%	10,360	27.39%
Visalia	Tulare	10,481	34.98%	17,950	59.91%	1,533	5.12%	-7,469	-24.93%	29,964	25.80%
Woodlake	Tulare	526	66.92%	219	27.86%	41	5.22%	307	39.06%	786	34.08%
Unincorporated Area	Tulare	8,153	33.12%	14,961	60.78%	1,501	6.10%	-6,808	-27.66%	24,615	22.30%
Sonora	Tuolumne	811	47.10%	802	46.57%	109	6.33%	9	0.52%	1,722	33.10%
Unincorporated Area	Tuolumne	8,212	39.64%	11,161	53.88%	1,342	6.48%	-2,949	-14.24%	20,715	32.86%
Camarillo	Ventura (Note: For Ventura County, California's Supplement to Statement of Vote contains a tabulation error where when combining the city totals, Brown has 3 more votes than the county total & Whitman has one more vote than the county total. This is why the statewide vote total in this table is different than elsewhere on this article.)	10,408	39.72%	14,500	55.33%	1,298	4.95%	-4,092	-15.61%	26,206	21.33%
Fillmore	Ventura	1,763	50.44%	1,484	42.46%	248	7.10%	279	7.98%	3,495	20.06%
Moorpark	Ventura	4,768	39.53%	6,652	55.15%	642	5.32%	-1,884	-15.62%	12,062	22.14%
Ojai	Ventura	1,927	58.39%	1,209	36.64%	164	4.97%	718	21.76%	3,300	28.16%
Oxnard	Ventura	21,836	61.44%	11,348	31.93%	2,354	6.62%	10,488	29.51%	35,538	19.77%
Port Hueneme	Ventura	2,592	55.56%	1,729	37.06%	344	7.37%	863	18.50%	4,665	26.69%
San Buenaventura	Ventura	19,984	50.44%	17,351	43.80%	2,283	5.76%	2,633	6.65%	39,618	23.36%
Santa Paula	Ventura	3,482	56.61%	2,247	36.53%	422	6.86%	1,235	20.08%	6,151	17.29%
Simi Valley	Ventura	15,493	36.04%	25,066	58.30%	2,434	5.66%	-9,573	-22.27%	42,993	24.27%
Thousand Oaks	Ventura	20,345	39.55%	28,872	56.13%	2,221	4.32%	-8,527	-16.58%	51,438	24.53%
Unincorporated Area	Ventura	15,205	44.10%	17,625	51.12%	1,648	4.78%	-2,420	-7.02%	34,478	23.10%
Davis	Yolo	17,613	75.73%	4,894	21.04%	751	3.23%	12,719	54.69%	23,258	48.60%
West Sacramento	Yolo	8,010	63.21%	4,058	32.02%	605	4.77%	3,952	31.18%	12,673	46.29%
Winters	Yolo	1,091	56.15%	728	37.47%	124	6.38%	363	18.68%	1,943	36.35%
Woodland	Yolo	7,724	52.52%	6,221	42.30%	761	5.17%	1,503	10.22%	14,706	42.38%
Unincorporated Area	Yolo	3,456	47.25%	3,555	48.61%	303	4.14%	-99	-1.35%	7,314	39.28%
Marysville	Yuba	1,203	44.69%	1,278	47.47%	211	7.84%	-75	-2.79%	2,692	40.77%
Wheatland	Yuba	308	33.12%	537	57.74%	85	9.14%	-229	-24.62%	930	37.24%
Unincorporated Area	Yuba	4,821	38.66%	6,738	54.03%	912	7.31%	-1,917	-15.37%	12,471	36.95%
Totals (Note: Statewide candidate vote percentages and the total vote number differ here because California's Supplement to Statement of Vote does not count write in votes as part of the city totals.)		5,428,152	53.77%	4,127,392	40.89%	539,283	5.34%	1,300,760	12.89%	10,094,827	29.76%

Cities & Unincorporated Areas that flipped from Republican to Tied

- Amador (Amador)

Cities & Unincorporated Areas that flipped from Republican to Democratic

- Dublin (Alameda)
- Fremont (Alameda)
- Livermore (Alameda)
- Piedmont (Alameda)
- Pleasanton (Alameda)
- Unincorporated Area of Alpine
- Sutter Creek (Amador)
- Chico (Butte)
- Williams (Colusa)
- Antioch (Contra Costa)
- Brentwood (Contra Costa)
- Concord (Contra Costa)
- Lafayette (Contra Costa)
- Martinez (Contra Costa)
- Moraga (Contra Costa)
- Oakley (Contra Costa)
- Orinda (Contra Costa)
- Pleasant Hill (Contra Costa)
- San Ramon (Contra Costa)
- Walnut Creek (Contra Costa)
- Unincorporated Area of Contra Costa
- Crescent City (Del Norte)
- Unincorporated Area of Del Norte
- South Lake Tahoe (El Dorado)
- Coalinga (Fresno)
- Firebaugh (Fresno)
- Fowler (Fresno)
- Fresno (Fresno)
- Kerman (Fresno)
- Sanger (Fresno)
- Selma (Fresno)
- Eureka (Humboldt)
- Unincorporated Area of Humboldt
- Brawley (Imperial)
- El Centro (Imperial)
- Holtville (Imperial)
- Imperial (Imperial)
- Westmorland (Imperial)
- Bishop (Inyo)
- Shafter (Kern)
- Wasco (Kern)
- Clearlake (Lake)
- Lakeport (Lake)
- Unincorporated Area of Lake
- Susanville (Lassen)
- Artesia (Los Angeles)
- Avalon (Los Angeles)
- Azusa (Los Angeles)
- Bellflower (Los Angeles)
- Beverly Hills (Los Angeles)
- Burbank (Los Angeles)
- Calabasas (Los Angeles)
- Cerritos (Los Angeles)
- Claremont (Los Angeles)
- Covina (Los Angeles)
- Downey (Los Angeles)
- Duarte (Los Angeles)
- Glendale (Los Angeles)
- Hermosa Beach (Los Angeles)
- Lakewood (Los Angeles)
- Lomita (Los Angeles)
- Long Beach (Los Angeles)
- Malibu (Los Angeles)
- Monrovia (Los Angeles)
- Palmdale (Los Angeles)
- Pasadena (Los Angeles)
- Redondo Beach (Los Angeles)
- San Gabriel (Los Angeles)
- Sierra Madre (Los Angeles)
- Signal Hill (Los Angeles)
- South Pasadena (Los Angeles)
- Temple City (Los Angeles)
- Walnut (Los Angeles)
- West Covina (Los Angeles)
- Whittier (Los Angeles)
- Unincorporated Area of Los Angeles
- Madera (Madera)
- Belvedere (Marin)
- Larkspur (Marin)
- Novato (Marin)
- Ross (Marin)
- Tiburon (Marin)
- Ukiah (Mendocino)
- Unincorporated Area of Mendocino
- Gustine (Merced)
- Los Banos (Merced)
- Merced (Merced)
- Mammoth Lakes (Mono)
- Carmel-by-the-Sea (Monterey)
- Del Rey Oaks (Monterey)
- King City (Monterey)
- Marina (Monterey)
- Monterey (Monterey)
- Pacific Grove (Monterey)
- Sand City (Monterey)
- Unincorporated Area of Monterey
- Calistoga (Napa)
- Napa (Napa)
- St. Helena (Napa)
- Yountville (Napa)
- Unincorporated Area of Napa
- Grass Valley (Nevada)
- Nevada City (Nevada)
- Truckee (Nevada)
- Laguna Beach (Orange)
- Santa Ana (Orange)
- Stanton (Orange)
- Blythe (Riverside)
- Cathedral City (Riverside)
- Desert Hot Springs (Riverside)
- Indio (Riverside)
- Moreno Valley (Riverside)
- Palm Springs (Riverside)
- Riverside (Riverside)
- Elk Grove (Sacramento)
- Galt (Sacramento)
- Isleton (Sacramento)
- Rancho Cordova (Sacramento)
- Sacramento (Sacramento)
- Unincorporated Area of Sacramento
- Hollister (San Benito)
- San Juan Bautista (San Benito)
- Adelanto (San Bernardino)
- Barstow (San Bernardino)
- Fontana (San Bernardino)
- Highland (San Bernardino)
- Montclair (San Bernardino)
- Needles (San Bernardino)
- Ontario (San Bernardino)
- San Bernardino (San Bernardino)
- Victorville (San Bernardino)
- Chula Vista (San Diego)
- Encinitas (San Diego)
- Imperial Beach (San Diego)
- La Mesa (San Diego)
- Lemon Grove (San Diego)
- San Diego (San Diego)
- Lathrop (San Joaquin)
- Manteca (San Joaquin)
- Stockton (San Joaquin)
- Tracy (San Joaquin)
- Grover Beach (San Luis Obispo)
- Morro Bay (San Luis Obispo)
- San Luis Obispo (San Luis Obispo)
- Belmont (San Mateo)
- Burlingame (San Mateo)
- Foster City (San Mateo)
- Half Moon Bay (San Mateo)
- Menlo Park (San Mateo)
- Millbrae (San Mateo)
- Portola Valley (San Mateo)
- Redwood City (San Mateo)
- San Carlos (San Mateo)
- San Mateo (San Mateo)
- Unincorporated Area of San Mateo
- Carpinteria (Santa Barbara)
- Goleta (Santa Barbara)
- Santa Barbara (Santa Barbara)
- Campbell (Santa Clara)
- Cupertino (Santa Clara)
- Gilroy (Santa Clara)
- Los Altos (Santa Clara)
- Los Gatos (Santa Clara)
- Milpitas (Santa Clara)
- Morgan Hill (Santa Clara)
- San Jose (Santa Clara)
- Santa Clara (Santa Clara)
- Sunnyvale (Santa Clara)
- Unincorporated Area of Santa Clara
- Scotts Valley (Santa Cruz)
- Unincorporated Area of Santa Cruz
- Dunsmuir (Siskiyou)
- Mt. Shasta (Siskiyou)
- Weed (Siskiyou)
- Benicia (Solano)
- Dixon (Solano)
- Fairfield (Solano)
- Rio Vista (Solano)
- Suisun City (Solano)
- Vacaville (Solano)
- Cloverdale (Sonoma)
- Healdsburg (Sonoma)
- Petaluma (Sonoma)
- Rohnert Park (Sonoma)
- Santa Rosa (Sonoma)
- Sonoma (Sonoma)
- Windsor (Sonoma)
- Unincorporated Area of Sonoma
- Ceres (Stanislaus)
- Newman (Stanislaus)
- Patterson (Stanislaus)
- Riverbank (Stanislaus)
- Live Oak (Sutter)
- Dinuba (Tulare)
- Farmersville (Tulare)
- Lindsay (Tulare)
- Porterville (Tulare)
- Sonora (Tuolumne)
- Fillmore (Ventura)
- Ojai (Ventura)
- Port Hueneme (Ventura)
- San Buenaventura (Ventura)
- West Sacramento (Yolo)
- Winters (Yolo)
- Woodland (Yolo)

== See also ==
- 2010 United States gubernatorial elections
