= Charles Edson =

American composer

- Born: April 3, 1863; San Francisco, California, United States
- Died: August 7, 1936 (aged 72); Santa Fe, New Mexico, United States
- Occupation: Composer

Charles Farwell Edson (April 3, 1863 – August 7, 1936) was an American composer. His work was part of the music event in the art competition at the 1932 Summer Olympics. He was the nephew of prominent Chicago businessman John V. Farwell and Senator Charles B. Farwell, as well as the first cousin of Anna de Koven and Rose Farwell Chatfield-Taylor. He married Katherine Philips Edson, and they had a son, Charles Farwell Edson, Jr.
