= Sarah Kernochan =

American documentarian and film director (born 1947)

- Born: Sarah Marshall Kernochan; December 30, 1947 (age 78); New York City, New York, U.S.
- Education: Rosemary Hall
- Alma mater: Sarah Lawrence College
- Occupations: Documentarian; film director; screenwriter; novelist; singer-songwriter
- Years active: 1972–present
- Spouse: James Lapine
- Children: Phoebe Lapine
- Parent(s): Adelaide Chatfield-Taylor; John Marshall Kernochan
- Relatives: Wayne Chatfield-Taylor (grandfather); Hobart Chatfield-Taylor (great-grandfather); Rose Chatfield-Taylor (great-grandmother); Charles B. Farwell (great-great-grandfather)
- Website: sarahkernochan.com

Sarah Marshall Kernochan (/ˈkɜːrnəkɛn/ KUR-nə-ken; born December 30, 1947) is an American documentarian, film director, screenwriter, and novelist. She has received several prestigious awards, including two Academy Awards (Documentary Feature for Marjoe in 1973 and Documentary Short Subject for Thoth in 2002).

== Early life and education ==
Kernochan was born in New York City, the daughter of Adelaide (Chatfield-Taylor), a UNESCO consultant, and John Marshall Kernochan, a Columbia Law School professor. Her maternal grandfather was Wayne Chatfield-Taylor, Under Secretary of Commerce and Assistant Secretary of the Treasury under President Franklin D. Roosevelt. Her maternal great-grandparents included writers Hobart Chatfield-Taylor and Anna De Koven. Her great-great-grandfather was Illinois Senator and XIT Ranch owner Charles B. Farwell. Her paternal grandfather was composer Marshall Kernochan.

Kernochan graduated from Rosemary Hall (now Choate Rosemary Hall) in 1965, where Glenn Close was her classmate, and attended Sarah Lawrence College in 1966.

== Career ==
After Sarah Lawrence, she worked as a ghostwriter for The Village Voice for about a year. After quitting that job, she became interested in documentary film-making and soon gained national prominence in the U.S. as co-director and co-producer with Howard Smith of the 1972 film Marjoe, about evangelist Marjoe Gortner, which won an Academy Award for Documentary Feature.

Kernochan's first screen credit as a screenwriter came with the film 9½ Weeks (1986). She then wrote the script for Dancers (1987), starring Mikhail Baryshnikov and directed by Herbert Ross, which chronicles the backstage drama of a ballet company (played by American Ballet Theatre dancers) and their director during the staging of the ballet Giselle.

By the time she was brought in to work on the film Sommersby (1993), Kernochan had become known for a particular style of writing in Hollywood. She said in an interview with Salon:

I think people know that there's no point in calling me in if you want the other kind of women characters: a featureless "help me" character, or the saint, the whore—you know, any of the archetypes. I don't think all women are powerful, intelligent, any of those things. I just require that female characters be very real, that they have all the dimensions that the male characters do.

Since then, she has been primarily a screenwriter for such films as Dancers (1987); Impromptu (1991), the debut film directed by her husband, James Lapine, with a script she called "maybe the best thing that I will ever do"; and Sommersby (1993). She also wrote and directed All I Wanna Do (1998); co-wrote the story for What Lies Beneath (2000); directed Thoth (2002); and wrote Learning to Drive (2014). In 2002, Thoth won the Academy Award for Best Documentary Short Subject.

Kernochan has taught screenwriting at Emerson College.

=== Novels ===
In 1977, Kernochan's novel Dry Hustle (ISBN 0-688-03149-8 in hardcover, ISBN 0-425-03661-8 in paperback) was published. It was reprinted as an ebook in 2011. In June 2011, Kernochan released her first novel in over 35 years, Jane Was Here (ISBN 0980037727).

=== Music career ===
Kernochan is also a singer, lyricist, and composer. During the two years after the release of Marjoe, she released two albums on RCA Records as a singer-songwriter, House of Pain and Beat Around the Bush, on which she sings, plays piano, and contributed arrangements.

Kernochan released her third album, Decades of Demos, in 2013. She also wrote the musical Sleeparound Town, about puberty and featuring five adolescents.

== Personal life ==
Kernochan is married to stage director James Lapine, a Pulitzer Prize and three-time Tony Award winner. The couple's daughter is food and health writer Phoebe Lapine.
