= Wayne Chatfield-Taylor =

American banker and government official

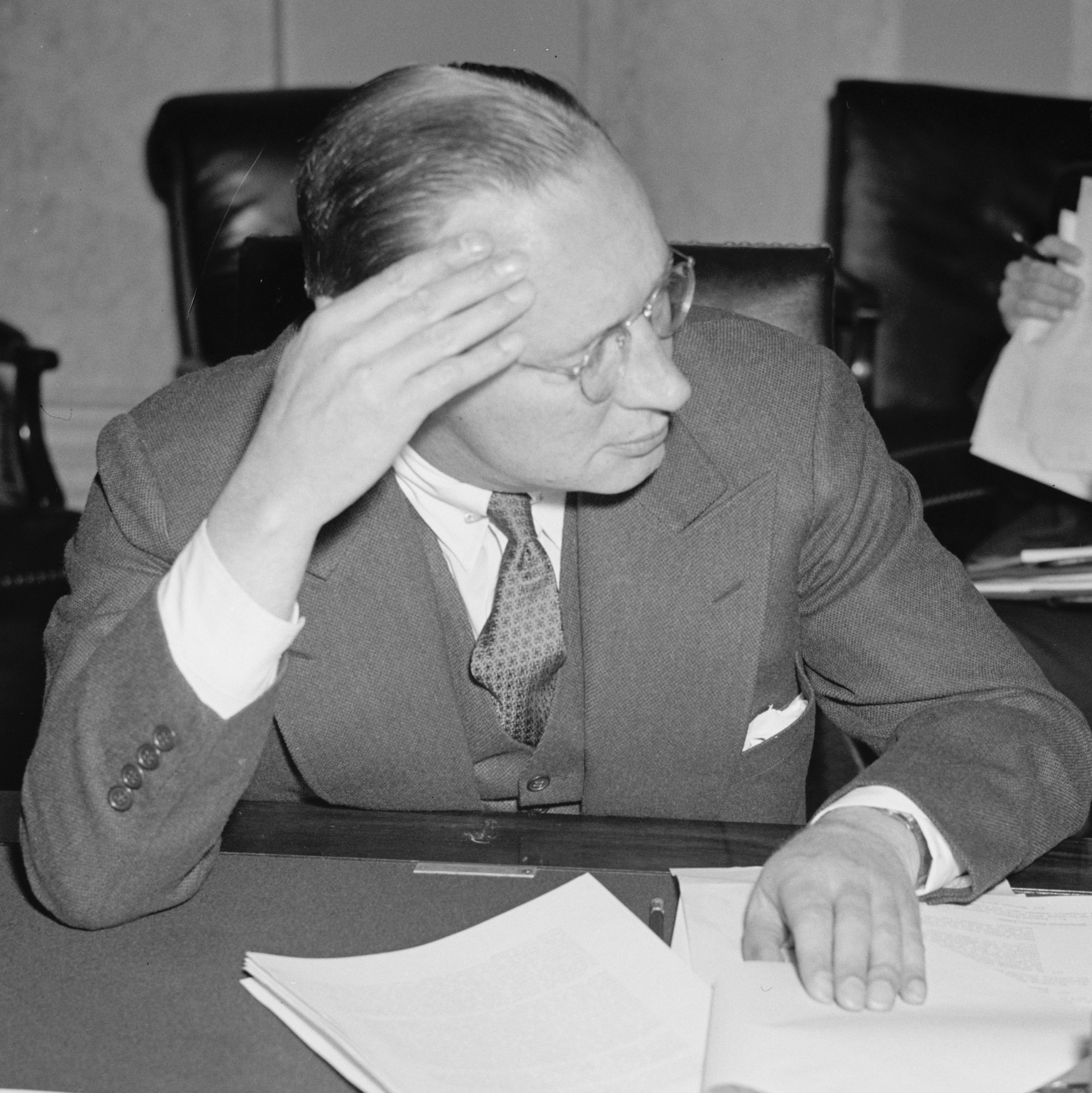
- Chatfield-Taylor testifying before the Senate Banking and Currency Committee, 1938

President of the Export-Import Bank
- In office April 1945 – 1946
- Preceded by: Warren Lee Pierson
- Succeeded by: Position abolished

Under Secretary of Commerce
- In office October 1940 – April 1945
- Preceded by: Edward J. Noble
- Succeeded by: Alfred Schindler

Assistant Secretary of the Treasury
- In office February 1936 – February 1939
- Preceded by: L. W. Robert Jr.
- Succeeded by: Herbert Gaston

Personal details
- Born: December 19, 1893 Chicago, Illinois, U.S.
- Died: November 22, 1967 (aged 73) Washington, D.C., U.S.
- Resting place: Rock Creek Cemetery; Washington, D.C., U.S.
- Spouse: Adele Margaret Blow (m. 1917)
- Relations: Charles B. Farwell (grandfather); Anna de Koven (aunt); Sarah Kernochan (granddaughter)
- Children: 4
- Parent(s): Rose Chatfield-Taylor; Hobart Chatfield-Taylor
- Education: St. Mark's School
- Alma mater: Yale University

Wayne Chatfield-Taylor (December 19, 1893 – November 22, 1967) was an American government official who was Under Secretary of Commerce from 1940 to 1945 and Assistant Secretary of the Treasury from 1936 to 1939 under President Franklin D. Roosevelt.

== Early life ==
Chatfield-Taylor was born in Chicago, Illinois on December 19, 1893 . He was one of four children born to Rose (née Farwell) Chatfield-Taylor and Hobart Chatfield-Taylor, an author and biographer who was considered a top authority on Molière. His siblings were Robert, Otis, and the eldest, Adelaide (wife of Hendricks Hallett Whitman and William Davies Sohier and grandmother of Meg Whitman). After his mother died in 1918, his father married Estelle (née Barbour) Stillman, the widow of George S. Stillman and daughter of George Harrison Barbour, in 1920.

His paternal grandparents were Henry Hobart Taylor and Adelaide (née Chatfield) Taylor. His father added "Chatfield" to his surname as the stipulation of a large inheritance from his maternal uncle, Wayne Chatfield. His maternal grandparents were U.S. Senator Charles B. Farwell (brother of John V. Farwell) and Mary Eveline (née Smith) Farwell. His maternal aunt Anna Farwell married the composer Reginald de Koven.

Wayne was a graduate of St. Mark's School in Southborough, Massachusetts and of Yale University. During World War I, he served overseas as a Lieutenant in the U.S. Army.

== Career ==
Chatfield-Taylor began his business career in 1916 with the Central Trust Company of Illinois (which had been formed in 1901 by former Comptroller of the Currency Charles G. Dawes before he became Vice President of the United States under Calvin Coolidge). Later, he worked for Field, Glore, Ward & Co., an investment banking house in Chicago, becoming vice president of the business in 1927. He was also vice president of the Chicago Investors corporation and a director of the People's Trust and Savings Bank.

He also served the government in administrative and advisory capacities from 1933 to 1952. He first joined President Franklin D. Roosevelt's New Deal administration in 1933 as assistant to the Administrator of the Agricultural Adjustment Administration before becoming special advisor to the President on foreign affairs. He joined the Export-Import Bank as a vice president 1935 before succeeding L. W. Robert Jr. as the Assistant Secretary of the Treasury under Secretary Henry Morgenthau Jr. in 1936. He resigned in February 1939 over differences over Treasury policies with Secretary Morgenthau to become the European delegate of the American Red Cross.

Chatfield-Taylor returned to government service in October 1940, becoming the Under Secretary of Commerce under Secretary Jesse H. Jones in 1940, and serving until 1945. In 1944, he was the federal official who took charge of Montgomery Ward & Co.'s Chicago plant after it was ordered seized by the government and the firm's chairman, Sewell Avery, was removed from the premises by soldiers. In April 1945, resigned from the Commerce Department to return to Export-Import Bank after being elected president. He served in that role until the position was abolished under the Export–Import Bank Act of 1945.

Later economic advisor to Paul G. Hoffman in setting up the Economic Cooperation Administration, Chatfield-Taylor was also economic advisor to the European Recovery Program (better known as the Marshall Plan) after World War II.

== Personal life ==
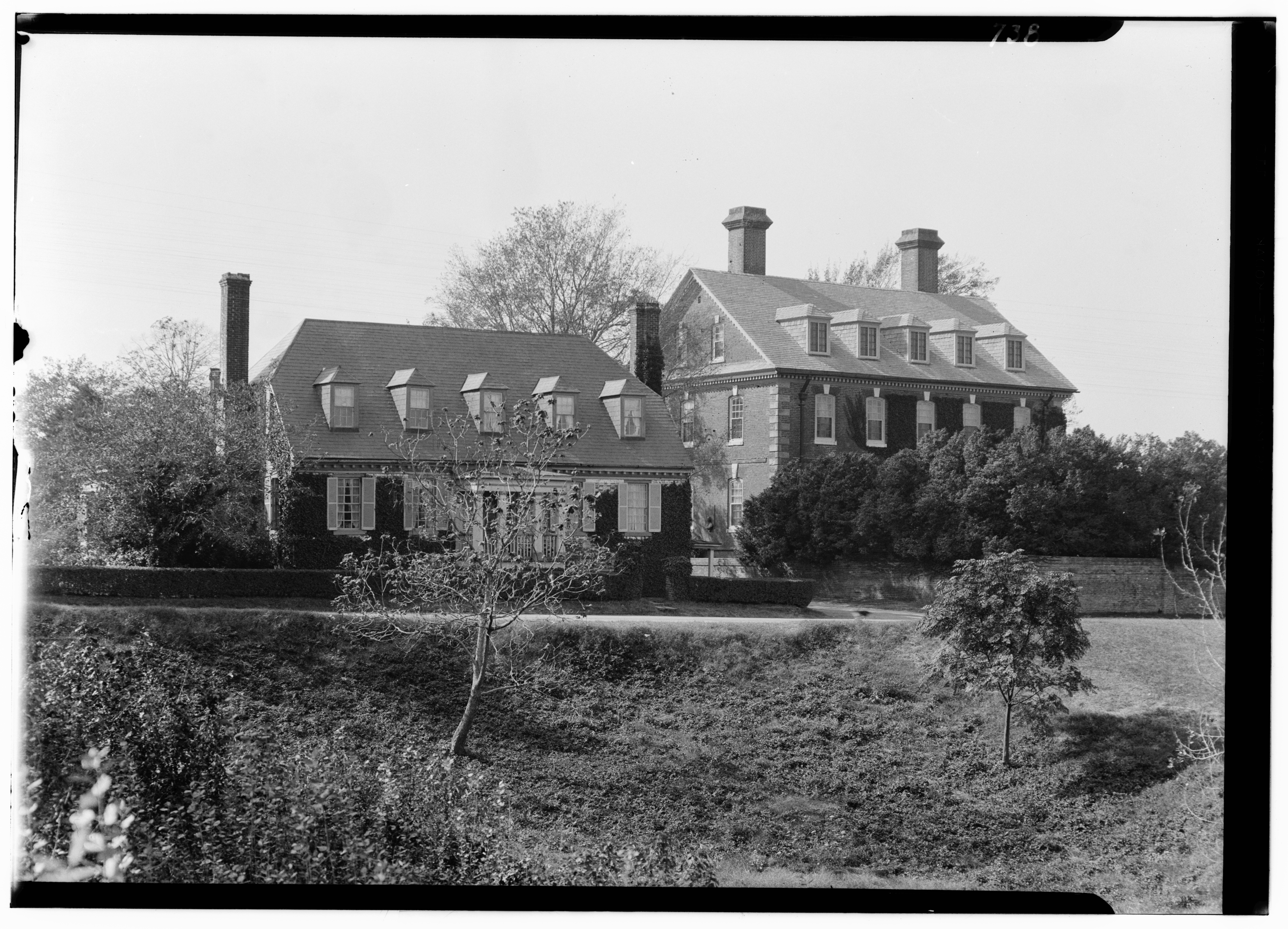
Chatfield-Taylor's residence, York Hall in Yorktown, Virginia

On August 22, 1917, Chatfield-Taylor was married to Adele Margaret Blow (1895–1977). He built the noted 1925 Lake Forest, Illinois mansion "Bluff's Edge" located at 620 Lake Road. His wife, a descendant of a family that settled in Virginia in 1609 and a member of the Colonial Dames of America, restored thirty historic homes and buildings, including the Thomas Nelson House (also known as York Hall) in Yorktown, Virginia, the Federal House, Nantucket, Massachusetts, and Mantua, a classic structure in Heathsville, Virginia.

Chatfield-Taylor died at the Washington Medical Center in Washington, D.C. on November 22, 1967. He was buried at Rock Creek Cemetery in Washington. His widow died on August 31, 1977, in Greenwich, Connecticut and was buried at Hollywood Cemetery in Richmond, Virginia.
