= Meg Whitman =

American business executive and diplomat (born 1956)

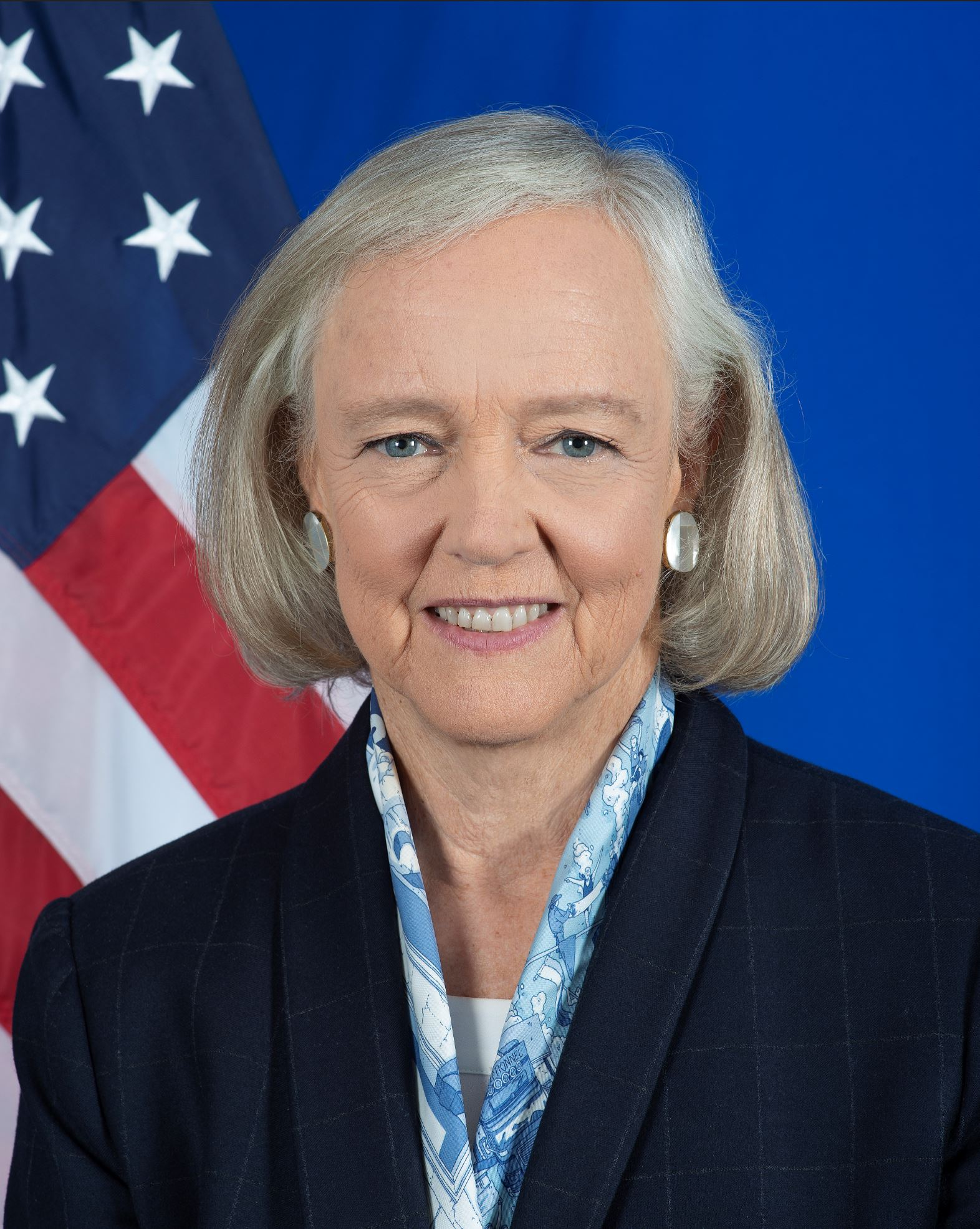
- Official portrait, 2022

United States Ambassador to Kenya
- In office August 5, 2022 – November 13, 2024
- President: Joe Biden
- Preceded by: Kyle McCarter
- Succeeded by: Marc Dillard; Chargé d'affaires

Personal details
- Born: Margaret Cushing Whitman; August 4, 1956 (age 70) Huntington, New York, U.S.
- Party: Democratic (since 2025)
- Other political affiliations: Republican (until 2025)
- Spouse: Griffith R. Harsh (m. 1980)
- Children: 2
- Education: Princeton University (AB); Harvard University (MBA)

Margaret Cushing Whitman (born August 4, 1956) is an American business executive, diplomat and politician. She served as the United States ambassador to Kenya from July 2022 to November 2024 under President Joe Biden.

Until 2025, when she stated she was a registered Democrat, Whitman was a member of the Republican Party. She ran for governor of California in the 2010 California gubernatorial election and lost to former California Governor Jerry Brown, 54% to 41%. The fifth-wealthiest woman in California with a net worth of $1.3 billion in 2010, she spent, at the time, more of her own money on a single election than any other political candidate in American history. The $144 million of her own fortune she used for the race (the campaign spent $178.5 million in total, including money from donors) was surpassed only by Michael Bloomberg in the 2020 presidential election. Whitman was a senior presidential campaign official for Republican Mitt Romney in both 2008 and 2012, although she supported Democrats Hillary Clinton and Joe Biden in the 2016 presidential election and the 2020 presidential election, respectively.

In 2008, Whitman was cited by The New York Times as among the women most likely to become the first female president of the United States. In 2014, Whitman was named 20th in Forbes List of the 100 Most Powerful Women in the World. Whitman has held various business executive positions at the Walt Disney Company, eBay, Hewlett Packard and Quibi.

== Early life and education ==
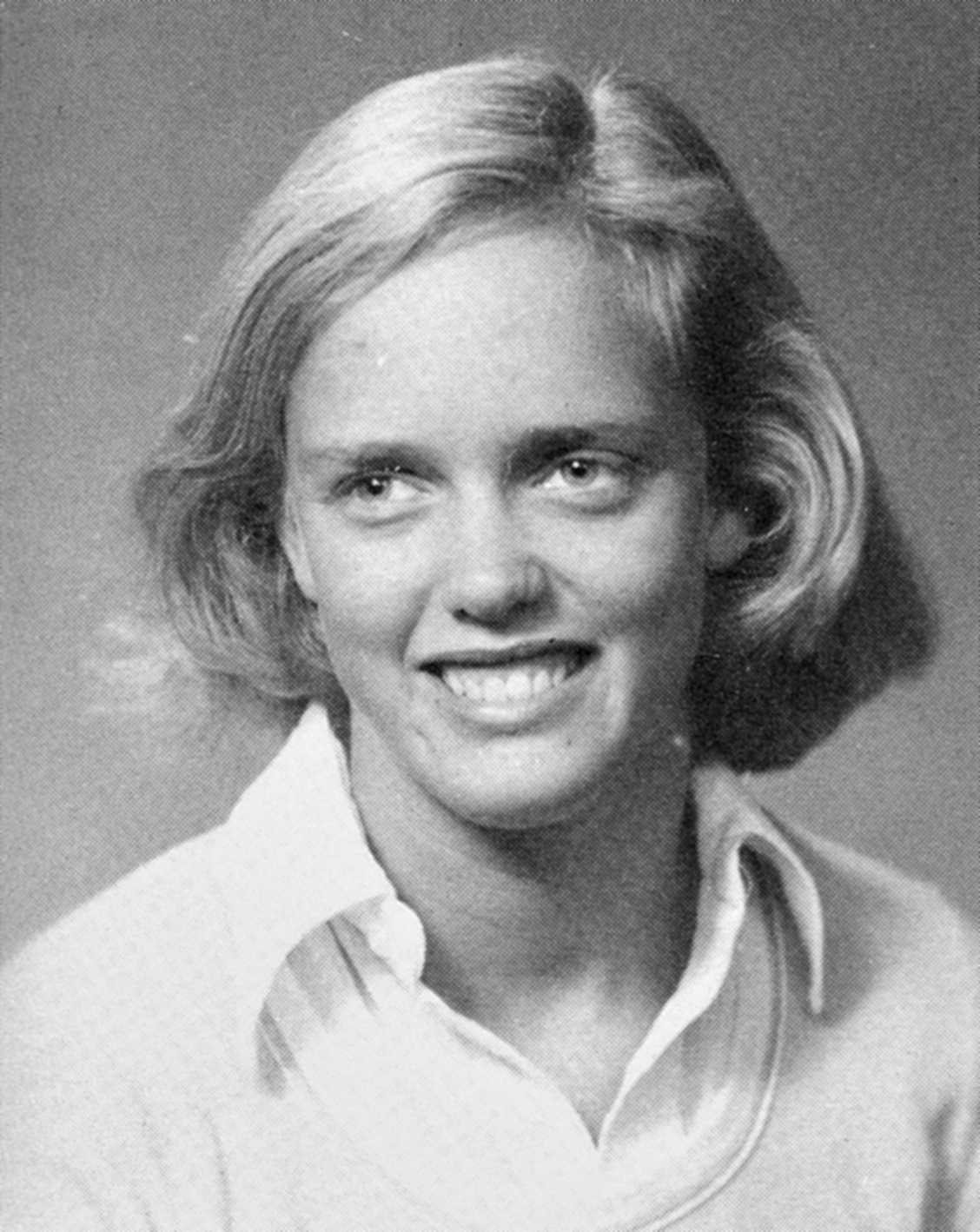
Whitman in the Princeton University yearbook, 1977

Whitman was born on August 4, 1956 in Cold Spring Harbor, New York, the daughter of Margaret Cushing (née Goodhue) and Hendricks Hallett Whitman Jr. Her patrilineal great-great-great-grandfather, Elnathan Whitman, was a member of the Nova Scotia House of Assembly and great-great-grandfather, Charles B. Farwell, of Illinois, was a U.S. Senator. On her mother's side, she is a great-granddaughter of historian and jurist Munroe Smith and a great-great-granddaughter of General Henry S. Huidekoper. Her paternal grandmother, born Adelaide Chatfield-Taylor, was the daughter of writer Hobart Chatfield-Taylor and his wife, Rose Farwell Chatfield-Taylor, and the sister of economist Wayne Chatfield-Taylor.

Whitman attended Cold Spring Harbor High School in Cold Spring Harbor, New York and graduated in 1974 after only three years. She wanted to be a doctor, so she studied math and science at Princeton University. However, after spending a summer selling advertisements for the magazine Business Today, she changed over to the study of economics. She graduated with an A.B. in economics with honors from Princeton University in 1977. Whitman obtained an M.B.A. from Harvard Business School in 1979.

Whitman is married to Griffith Harsh IV, Chair of Neurosurgery at the University of California, Davis, previously at Stanford University Medical Center. They have two sons, Griffith Harsh V and William Harsh. Whitman College, a residential college completed in 2007 at Princeton University, was named for Meg Whitman following her $30 million donation.

== Career ==
=== Early work ===
Whitman began her career in 1979 as a brand manager at Procter & Gamble in Cincinnati, Ohio. Whitman later moved on to work as a consultant at Bain & Company from 1989 to 1992. She rose through the ranks to achieve the position of senior vice president.

Whitman became vice president of strategic planning at the Walt Disney Company in 1989. Two years later, she joined the Stride Rite Corporation before becoming president and CEO of Florists' Transworld Delivery in 1995.

As Hasbro's Playskool Division general manager, starting in January 1997, she oversaw global management and marketing of two children's brands, Playskool and Mr. Potato Head. She also imported the UK's children's television show Teletubbies into the U.S.

=== eBay ===
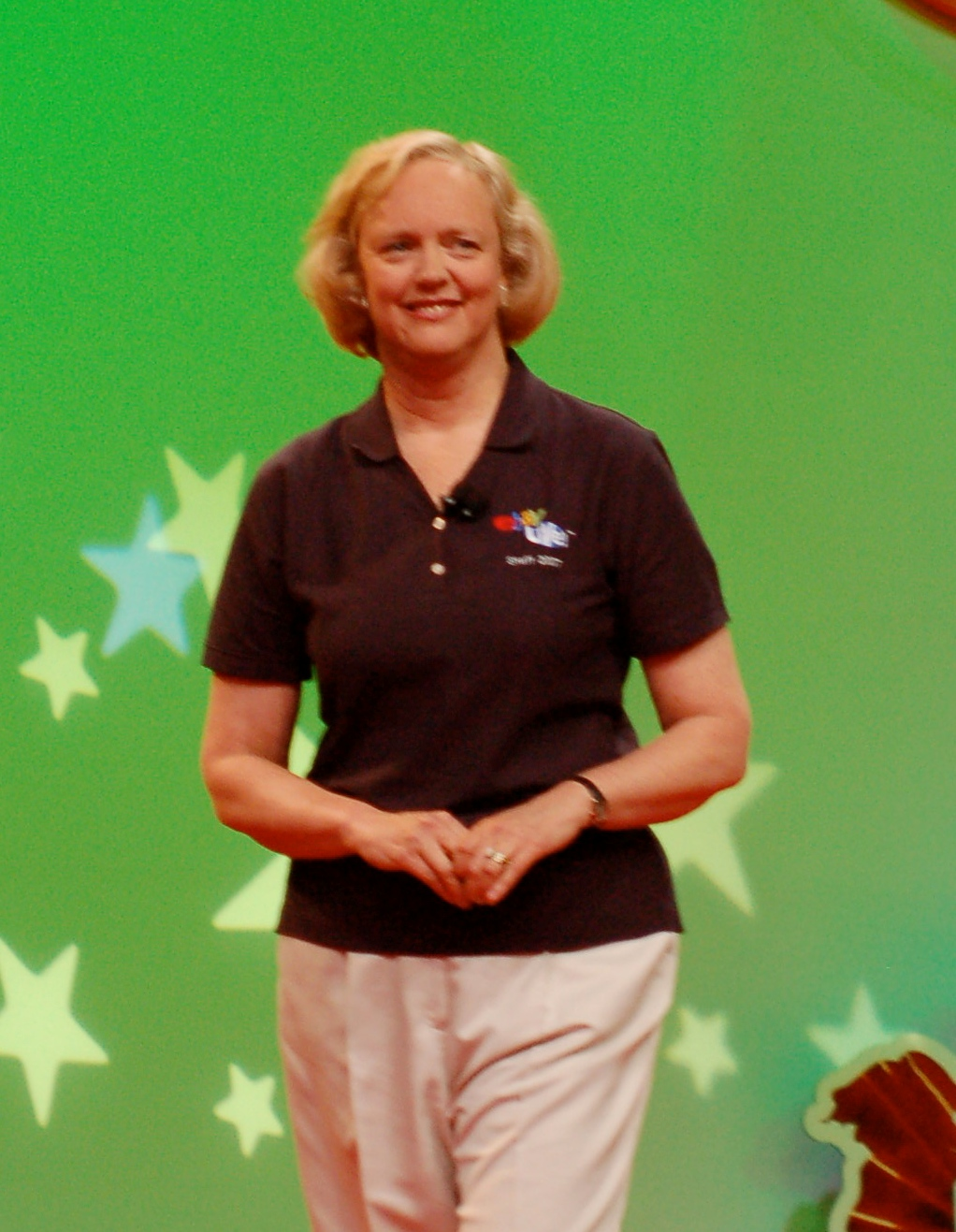
Whitman speaking at eBay Live, 2005.

Whitman joined eBay in March 1998 when it had 30 employees and annual revenues of approximately $4 million. During her time as CEO, through 2008, the company grew to approximately 15,000 employees and $8 billion in annual revenue. In 2002, soon after its initial public offering, PayPal became a wholly owned subsidiary of eBay valued at $1.5 billion.

During Whitman's tenure as CEO, eBay completed the purchase of Skype for $4.1B in cash and stock in September 2005.

In June 2007, while preparing for an interview with Reuters, Whitman allegedly shoved her subordinate, communications employee Young Mi Kim. Of the incident, Whitman related, "In any high-pressure working environment, tensions can surface." Kim also stated, "Yes, we had an unfortunate incident, but we resolved it in a way that speaks well for her and for eBay." The matter was resolved after a $200,000 settlement.

Whitman resigned as CEO of eBay in November 2007, but remained on the board and served as an advisor to new CEO John Donahoe until late 2008. She was inducted into the U.S. Business Hall of Fame in 2008.

Whitman received accolades for her work at eBay. She was named among the top five most powerful women by Fortune magazine. Harvard Business Review named her the eighth-best-performing CEO of the past decade. The Financial Times named her as one of the 50 faces that shaped the decade.

=== Hewlett-Packard ===
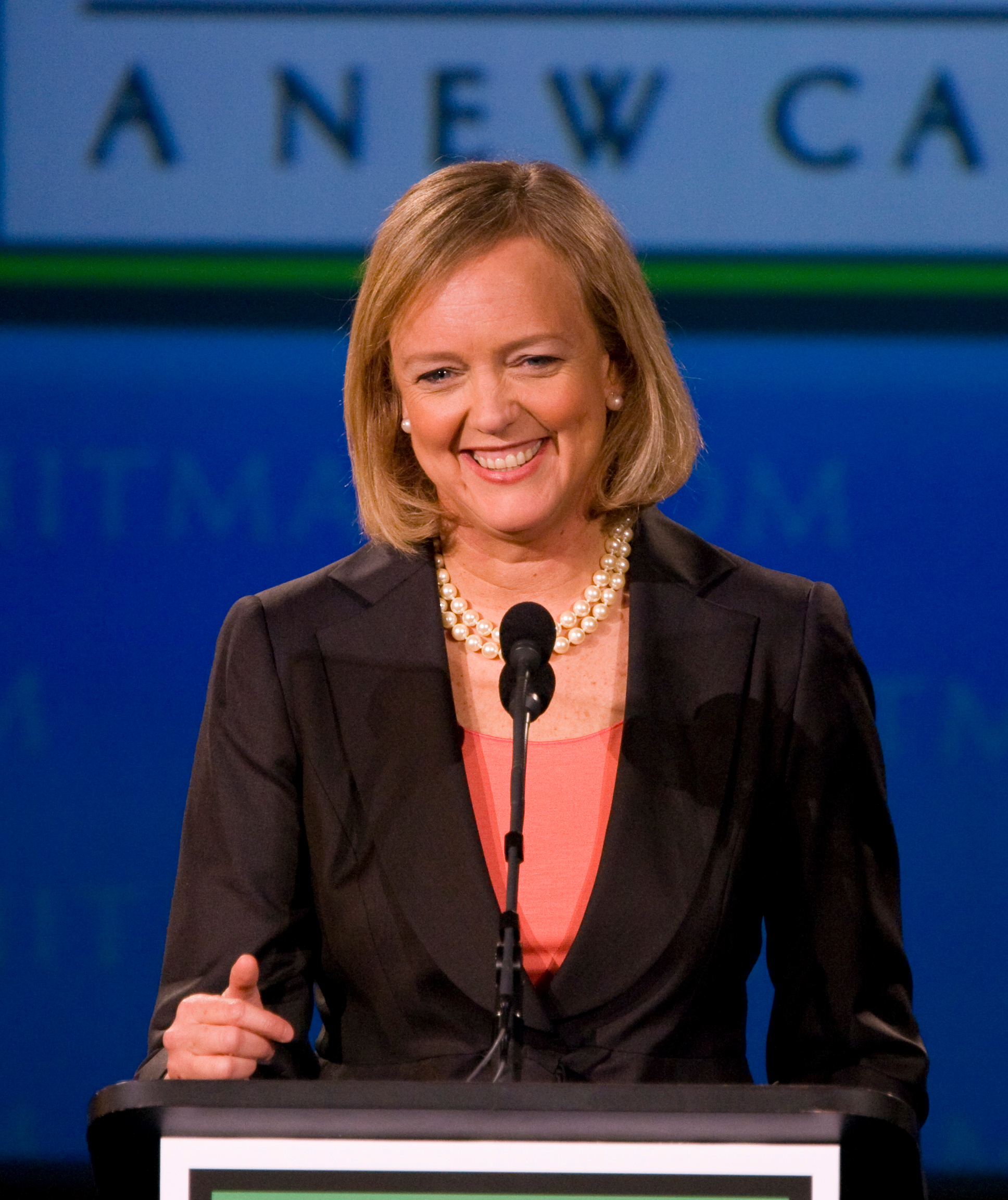
Whitman speaking at a conference in 2009.

In January 2011, Whitman joined Hewlett-Packard's (HP) board of directors. She was named CEO on September 22, 2011. As well as renewing focus on HP's Research & Development division, Whitman's major decision during her first year as CEO was to retain and recommit the firm to the PC business that her predecessor announced he was considering discarding.

In 2012, Whitman announced that HP would write down $8.8 billion of the value of Autonomy, the British software company it had purchased the previous year. The announcement eventually led to a civil case in the UK in 2019 at which Whitman testified to having not carried out "proper calculations of the write-down."

In May 2013, Bloomberg L.P. named Whitman "Most Underachieving CEO" – along with Apple's CEO Tim Cook (ranked 12th) and IBM's Virginia Rometty (ranked 10th) – whose stocks had all turned in the worst numbers relative to the broader market since the beginning of each CEO's tenure. HP's stock led the list by underperforming by 30.7 percentage points since Whitman took the job.

On July 26, 2017, Whitman stepped down as chair of HP Inc.'s board of directors, while remaining as CEO of Hewlett Packard Enterprise (HPE). Whitman fought off further rumours around her position at HPE, where she was quoted by The New York Times "So let me make this as clear as I can. I am fully committed to HPE and plan to remain the company's C.E.O. We have a lot of work still to do at HPE and I am not going anywhere"

On November 21, 2017, it was announced Whitman was stepping down as the CEO of HPE, effective February 1, 2018, with HPE president Antonio Neri taking over as CEO.

=== Quibi ===
Whitman was CEO of Quibi, a short-form media content app designed for smartphones. In September 2020, just 5 months after its launch, Quibi was considering sale or acquisition with a valuation of $500 million, despite its $1.75 billion initial investment, having failed to meet subscriber targets. Coverage and analysis has blamed this failure on the concept itself, and failures of leadership from Whitman due to her lack of "experience in the industry of the company she is running." The failure of the app was predicted by many in the Silicon Valley tech ecosystem, with one critic, Rob Enderle listing this as the most recent in Whitman's "repetitive failures" due to her "inability to take responsibility for mistakes, an inability to support subordinates, a focus on shifting blame, and a lack of subject matter expertise."

=== Boards ===
Whitman also served on the board of directors of the eBay Foundation, Summit Public Schools, Procter & Gamble and DreamWorks SKG, until early 2009. She was appointed to the board of Goldman Sachs in October 2001 and then resigned in December 2002, amidst controversy that she had received shares in several public offerings managed by Goldman Sachs, although she denied any wrongdoing. (see Ties to Goldman Sachs for further detail). In March 2011, she was appointed to a part-time special adviser at venture capital firm Kleiner Perkins.

She has also joined the boards of Zipcar and Teach for America, and re-joined the board of Procter & Gamble. Whitman has also been a member of the board at SurveyMonkey.

In March 2025, Whitman was appointed as a non-executive director of CoreWeave.

=== Sports investments ===
==== IGC ====
In 2018, Meg Whitman invested in and joined the board of the eSports organization Immortals Gaming Club.

==== FC Cincinnati ====
In November 2019, Meg Whitman purchased a minority stake in FC Cincinnati. Whitman will serve as the club's Alternate Governor on the MLS Board of Governors.

=== Biden administration ===
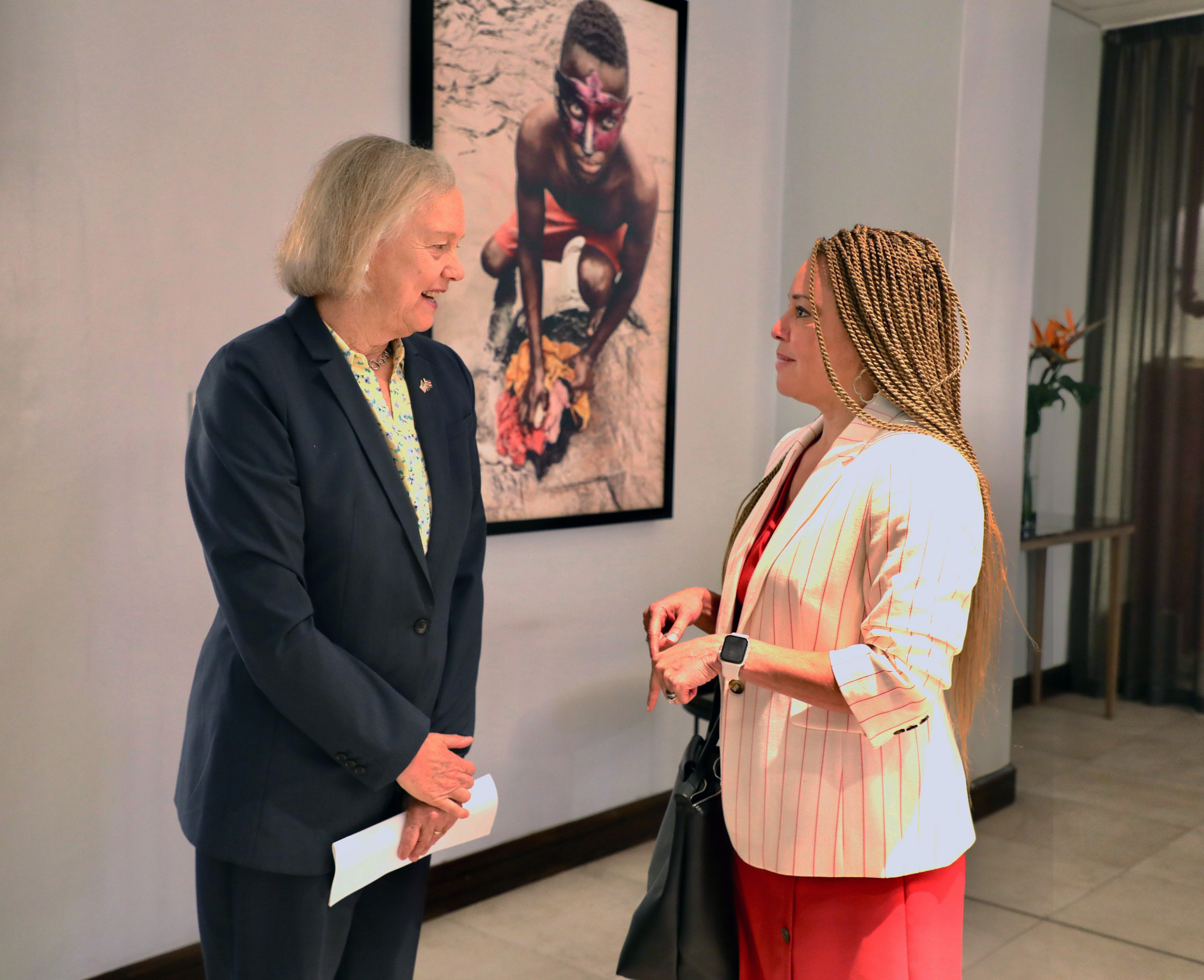
Whitman speaking with Agriculture Deputy Secretary Jewel H. Bronaugh in 2022.

On December 8, 2021, President Joe Biden nominated Whitman to serve as United States ambassador to Kenya. Hearings on her nomination were held before the Senate's Foreign Relations Committee on May 24, 2022. The committee favorably reported her nomination on June 9, 2022. On July 14, 2022, her nomination was confirmed in the Senate by voice vote. She presented her credentials to President Uhuru Kenyatta on August 5, 2022. In November 2024, following the election of Donald Trump, Whitman presented her resignation as US Ambassador to Kenya.

== Political career ==
=== Presidential endorsements and fundraising ===
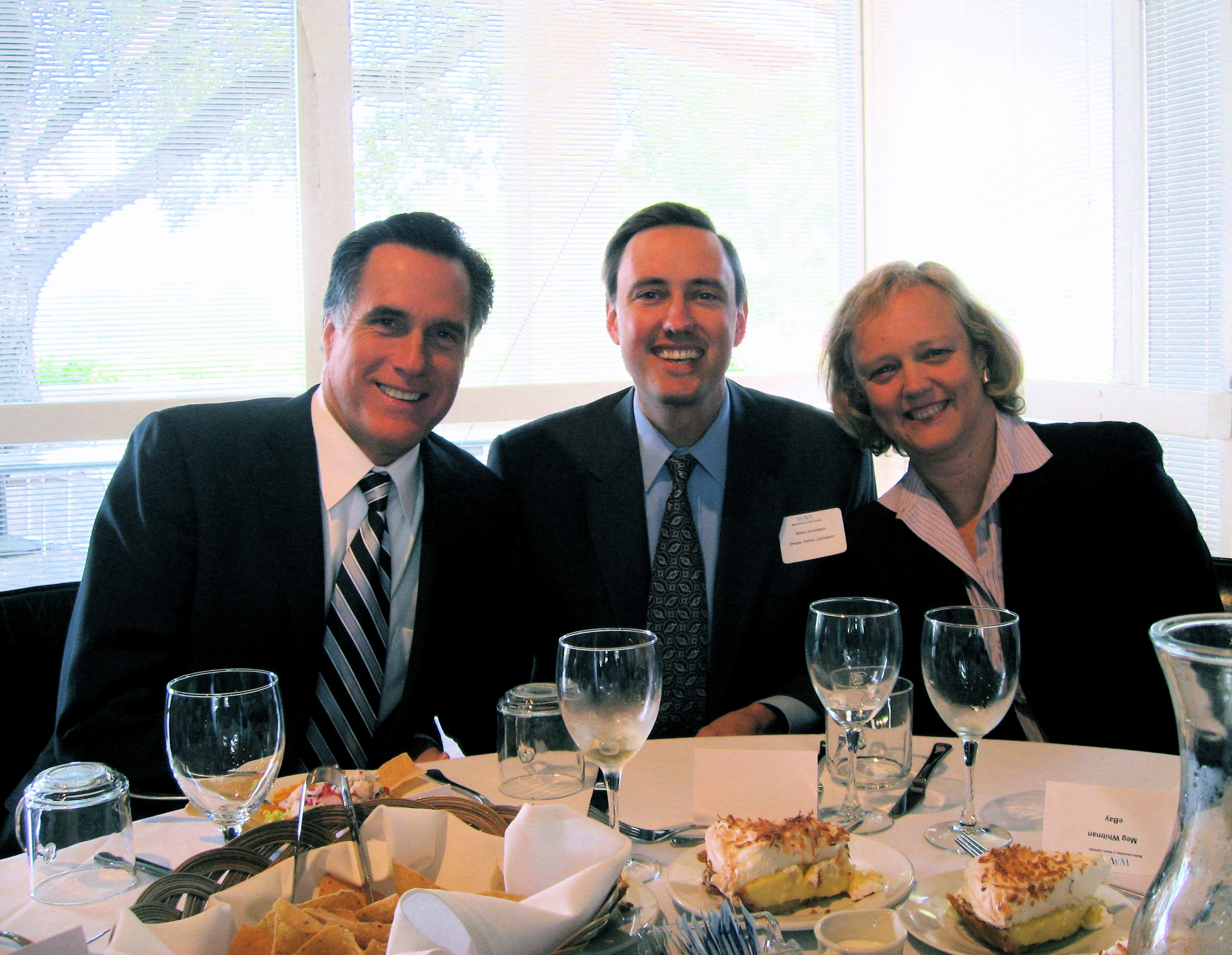
Whitman with then-governor Mitt Romney in 2007

Whitman was a supporter of the Mitt Romney 2008 presidential campaign and was a member of his national finance team. She was also listed as finance co-chair of Romney's exploratory committee. After Romney stepped out of the race and endorsed John McCain, Whitman joined McCain's presidential campaign as a national co-chair. McCain mentioned Whitman as a possible secretary of the treasury during the second presidential debate in 2008, but lost the election to Barack Obama.

During the 2012 Republican primaries, Whitman endorsed Mitt Romney, who praised her. Whitman's name was mentioned as a possible cabinet member in a Romney administration before he lost to Obama.

During the 2016 Republican primaries, Whitman was finance co-chair of the Chris Christie 2016 presidential campaign. After Christie withdrew from the race and subsequently endorsed Donald Trump, Whitman criticized it as "an astonishing display of political opportunism" and called on other Christie donors to reject Trump, whom she compared to Adolf Hitler and Benito Mussolini. In August, Whitman endorsed the Hillary Clinton 2016 presidential campaign, stating that to vote for Trump "out of party loyalty alone would be to endorse a candidacy that I believe has exploited anger, grievance, xenophobia and racial division". Acknowledging policy differences with Clinton, Whitman nonetheless praised her "temperament, global experience and commitment to America's bedrock national values". She called on all Republicans "to put country first before party" and added that she would support the campaign financially.

Whitman spoke at the 2020 Democratic National Convention in support of the party's presidential nominee Joe Biden.

=== 2010 gubernatorial campaign ===
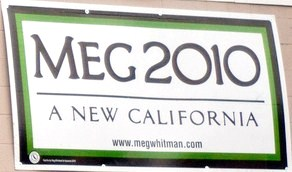
Whitman's campaign sign for Governor of California

On February 10, 2009, Whitman announced she would run for governor of California in the 2010 election. On June 8, 2010, Whitman won the Republican primary, becoming the first female to run on the Republican ticket and the third female overall to run for Governor of California after Dianne Feinstein in 1990 and Kathleen Brown in 1994. Her campaign was largely self-funded. She ultimately lost to Jerry Brown.

According to final reports, Whitman spent $144 million from her own personal funds. As of 2010, this was more than any other self-funded political candidate in U.S. history.

In June 2010, Whitman released a political ad, "A Lifetime in Politics A Legacy of Failure", which seemingly contained one image of the FAIL Blog website, making it appear in the ad as if Jerry Brown had been the subject of one of the website's namesake "fails". Ben Huh, founder of the Cheezburger Network, of which failblog.org is a part, demanded an apology and the removal of the video, stating that the image was faked, and that the website is non-partisan and has never endorsed a particular political candidate or party.

On November 2, 2010, at 11:35 pm, Whitman conceded the election to Brown, stating, "We've come up a little short."

==== Voting record ====
In 2010, The Sacramento Bee reported that Whitman did not vote for 28 years, after reviewing her voting records in California. Whitman has described her voting record as "inexcusable", apologized for it, and stated that she is happy to discuss the matter. Whitman answered questions about her record in September, replying, "And I think the reason is, is for many years, I wasn't as engaged in the political process and should have been."

==== Housekeeper controversy ====
In September 2010, Nicky Diaz Santillan revealed that she was employed in the Whitman household as a housekeeper and nanny from 2000 to 2009 despite her status as an illegal worker. Whitman's campaign released documents which she said Santillan provided prior to her employment including a driver's license, Social Security ID, and application. Santillan said Whitman knew she was undocumented, producing a 2003 letter from the Social Security Administration stating that her Social Security number did not match her name. Whitman initially stated that they "never received those letters", however, after a hand-written note on the document was shown, believed to be from Whitman's husband, they acknowledged they may have received it, but forgot. Santillan's attorney, Gloria Allred, states that Santillan was fired for the sake of the campaign. Whitman's campaign maintained that this was a political attack, stating that Allred is a Jerry Brown supporter. Brown, Allred and Santillan all denied this.

Crystal Williams, director of the American Immigration Lawyers Association, stated, "Not only is accepting the documents all the law required [Whitman] to do, but there's a counterbalancing anti-discrimination law that keeps her from probing further or demanding different documents." Others disagreed; immigration lawyer Greg Siskind stated Whitman was the employer, and the documents by law needed to be signed by her but were not, nor did they have a Social Security number on them. The Fort Worth Star-Telegram noted that Whitman "hired her, paid her and had direct contact with her for nine years", so should have known her legal status. The Los Angeles Times noted that Latino voters were more likely interested that Whitman treated Santillan "like a piece of garbage" when the maid asked for help finding an immigration attorney, and Whitman allegedly stated "you don't know me and I don't know you".

==== Ties to Goldman Sachs ====
Goldman Sachs, whose executives donated $100,000 to the Whitman campaign, manages a part of Whitman's fortune. As CEO of eBay, Whitman earned approximately $1.78 million resulting from a practice known as spinning whereby executives who did business with Goldman Sachs could reap profits by getting early deals before the public on hot IPOs offered by the bank. Whitman later resigned from the Goldman Sachs board after some expressed concern over her receiving shares from Goldman Sachs. In commenting on Whitman's resignation from the Goldman Sachs board, eBay spokesman Henry Gomez told The Wall Street Journal at the time that, "If we wanted to use Goldman's services, she doesn't want there to be even the slightest perception of any conflict. She's doing this because she thinks quite highly of the firm." While Whitman was on Goldman Sachs' board, she served on the compensation committee, which approved multimillion-dollar bonus packages for then-CEO Henry Paulson and his top aides. Public domain documents reveal that Whitman has a multimillion-dollar stake in 21 investment funds managed by Goldman Sachs. Given Goldman Sachs' major investments in California state finances, all these ties to Goldman Sachs led to considerable controversy during the gubernatorial campaign. In response, Whitman vowed to eliminate any potential conflicts of interest, and publicly stated that she would immediately sell her Goldman Sachs stock and put her Goldman Sachs-managed investments in a blind trust if elected governor.

=== United States Ambassador to Kenya ===
On December 8, 2021, President Biden nominated Whitman to be ambassador to Kenya. She was confirmed by the U.S. Senate in a unanimous vote as the eighteenth United States Ambassador to Kenya on July 14, 2022. She presented her credentials to President Uhuru Kenyatta, on August 5, 2022.

In August 2023, Whitman attracted criticism and public outcry from opposition figures in Kenya for perceived partisan political remarks claiming the 2022 election was the freest and fairest in Kenya's election history despite numerous reports of electoral malpractices in Kenya.Raila Odinga described Whitman as a rogue ambassador calling for her to shut up on political partisan comments while claiming that Kenya is not a US colony to warrant her perceived political partisan activities. Raila told the media he would demand her recall for her participation in partisan local politics. With perceived political partisan positions, Whitman was repeatedly thought to support reported human rights abuses by the Ruto administration including a specific case where other western diplomats in Kenya signed a statement admonishing abductions and killings during the 25th June 2024 Gen Z protests in Kenya which Whitman did not sign.

According to Whitman, it was not appropriate for her to participate in the signing that included congratulatory messages as well as messages admonishing the extra judicial abductions and extra judicial killings by the Ruto administration. Following Trump's win in 2024, Whitman announced her resignation as ambassador.

== Political positions ==
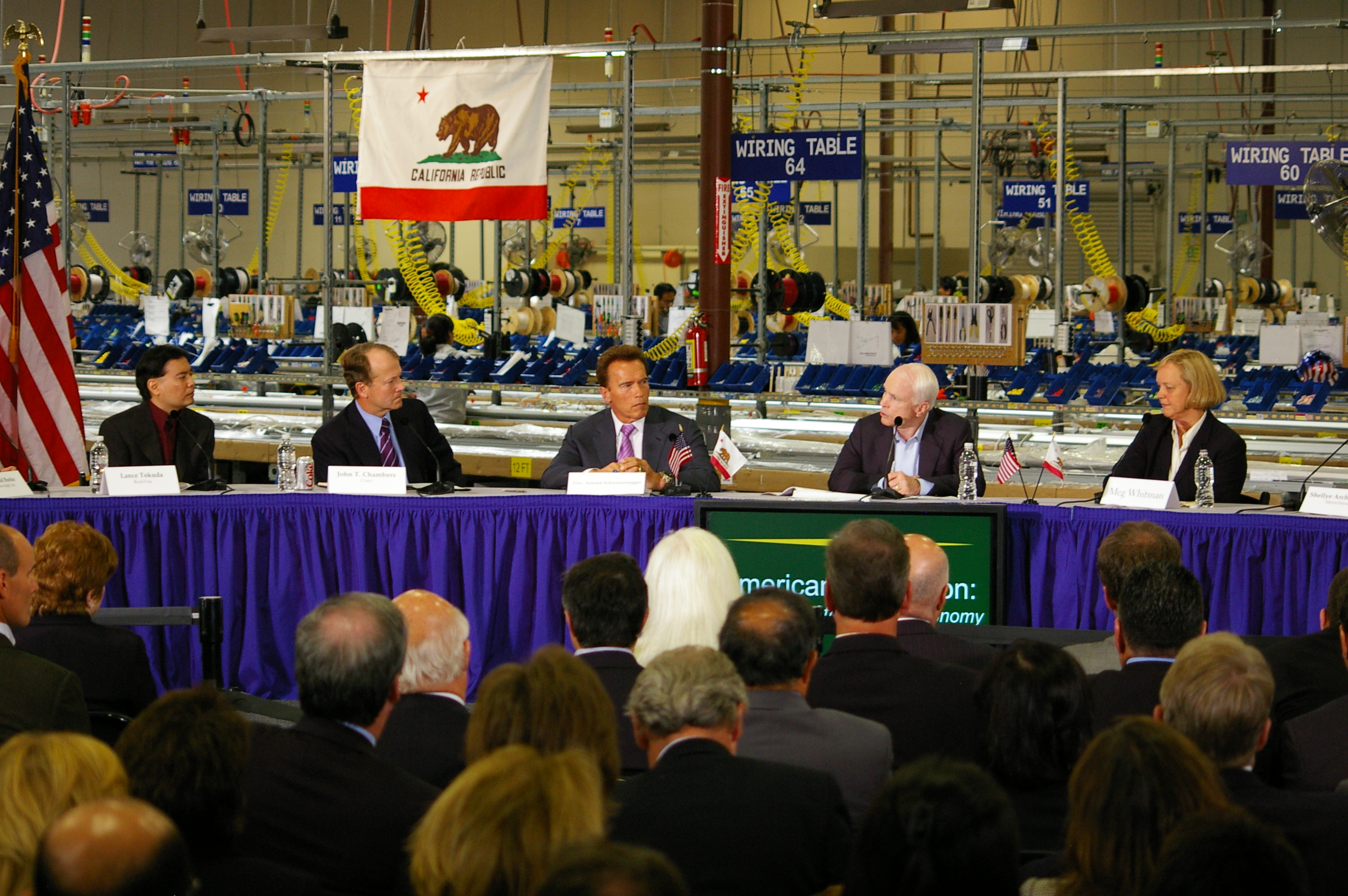
Whitman (far right) at a conference with John T. Chambers, governor Arnold Schwarzenegger, and U.S. Senator John McCain in 2008.

While running for governor, Whitman emphasized three major areas: job creation, reduced state government spending, and reform of the state's K-12 educational system. She argued that it is best to start only a few things and finish them, instead of starting a lot of things and finishing few of them.

=== Environment ===
Whitman said that if elected, on her first day she would have suspended AB 32, the Global Warming Solutions Act of 2006, for a year to study its potential economic implications. AB 32 requires the state to cut greenhouse gas emissions by 30 percent by 2020. At the state Republican Convention in March 2010, Whitman described California Republican Governor Arnold Schwarzenegger's climate change bill as a "job-killer". Whitman opposed Proposition 23, which would delay the global warming law AB 32 until California's unemployment falls to 5.5 percent and stays there for a year, stating that the proposition did not reasonably balance the need to protect jobs with the need to preserve environment.

On water issues, Whitman opposed further restrictions on water supply in the Central Valley, and she suggested that President Obama should overturn a federal judge's ruling under provisions in the Endangered Species Act which reduced water supplies another 5% to 7%.

=== Illegal immigration ===
Whitman said that Arizona's approach to illegal immigration with Arizona SB 1070 is wrong and that there are better ways to solve the problem. She said that, if she had lived in California in 1994, she would have voted against Proposition 187 concerning illegal immigrants. In an op-ed during her gubernatorial campaign, Whitman wrote, "Clearly, when examining our positions on immigration, there is very little over which Jerry Brown and I disagree".

She stated that illegal immigrant students should be prohibited from attending state-funded institutions of higher education. Currently, California state law permits this. In 2009, Whitman called for "a path to legalization" of illegal immigrants. In a 2010 interview on television station KTLA, Whitman said, "I want to hold employers accountable for hiring only documented workers."

=== Marriage ===
During the 2010 California gubernatorial election, Whitman supported California's Proposition 8, which reversed In re Marriage Cases and defined marriage as a union between one man and one woman in the state. Whitman also criticized Governor Arnold Schwarzenegger and Attorney General Jerry Brown for not defending Proposition 8 in the federal judicial system. However, on February 26, 2013, Whitman confirmed that she had reversed that opinion. Whitman stated, "At the time, I believed the people of California had weighed in on this question and that overturning the will of the people was the wrong approach," and "The facts and arguments presented during the legal process since then have had a profound impact on my thinking." Whitman also believes that gay and lesbian couples should be permitted to adopt children.

=== Abortion ===
Whitman supports abortion rights.

=== Marijuana ===
While campaigning during the 2010 California gubernatorial election, Whitman has suggested "Every law enforcement person will tell you that we shouldn't be legalizing marijuana for any reason, least of all for monetary gain." and that "This is the worst idea I've ever seen."

=== Infrastructure ===
Whitman does not support the California High-Speed Rail project. In a 2010 letter to the Sacramento Bee Whitman's spokeswoman Sarah Pompei said, "Meg believes the state cannot afford the costs associated with high-speed rail due to our current fiscal crisis." Her opponent Jerry Brown was in favor of the project.

Whitman has made monetary donations to various candidates and political action committees (PAC). While these have gone to both Republicans and Democrats, the donations are weighted to Republicans. Though Whitman has contributed to a few Democrats, including Senator Barbara Boxer; donating $4,000 to her campaign and serving on the "Friends of Boxer" committee in 2004, she donated more than $225,000 during the same period to Republicans, eBay's PAC and to Americans for a Republican Majority, the PAC of former Congressman Tom DeLay.

== Philanthropy ==
Whitman founded a charitable foundation with her husband, Griffith Harsh, on December 21, 2006, by donating 300,000 shares of eBay stock worth $9.4 million. By the end of its first year of operation, the Griffith R. Harsh IV and Margaret C Whitman Charitable Foundation had $46 million in assets and has disbursed $125,000 to charitable causes.

In 2010, Warren Buffett asked Whitman to join the Giving Pledge in which billionaires would commit to donating half of their money to charity, and Whitman declined. In 2011, the foundation donated $2.5 million to Summit Public Schools, which operates several charter schools in the San Jose area.

== Personal life ==
Whitman currently lives in Albuquerque, New Mexico since 2025, she relocated to the state after she left her Ambassadorship in Kenya and her husband, Dr. Griffith Harsh IV, became the head of neurosurgery at the University of New Mexico.

== Awards ==
In 2017, Whitman was the Commencement speaker for Carnegie Mellon University and was awarded an honorary doctorate degree.

== See also ==
- List of richest American politicians

Business positions
Preceded by Jeffrey Skoll	President and CEO of eBay; 1998–2008	Succeeded by John Donahoe
Preceded by Léo Apotheker	President and CEO of Hewlett-Packard; 2011–2015	Incumbent
Party political offices
Preceded by Arnold Schwarzenegger	Republican nominee for Governor of California; 2010	Succeeded by Neel Kashkari
Diplomatic posts
Preceded by Kyle McCarter	United States Ambassador to Kenya; 2022–2024	Succeeded by Marc Dillard; Chargé d'affaires
