= John Marshall Kernochan =

- Born: August 3, 1919
- Died: October 29, 2007 (aged 88); Jamaica Plain, Massachusetts
- Education: St. Mark's School; Princeton University
- Alma mater: Harvard University; Columbia Law School
- Spouse: Adelaide Chatfield-Taylor (m. 1941, died)
- Children: 5, including Sarah Kernochan
- Parent(s): Marshall R. Kernochan; Caroline Rigney Hatch

John Marshall Kernochan (August 3, 1919 – October 29, 2007) was a law professor, composer and music publisher who founded Columbia Law School's Kernochan Center for Law, Media and the Arts. His pioneering work in intellectual property law helped spur stronger protections for artists.

== Early life ==
Kernochan was born August 3, 1919, the only child of Marshall R. Kernochan (1880–1955) and Caroline Rigney (née Hatch) Kernochan, a World War I nurse. His father studied music in Frankfurt, Germany with Ivan Knorr and with Percy Goetschius at the Institute of Musical Art (predecessor to Juilliard School) and later served as president of the Galaxy Music Corporation.

Kernochan prepared at St. Mark's School in Southborough, Massachusetts. There, for the school's yearbook, he produced memorable verses on that year's graduates, which kicked off a lifelong pastime of writing doggerel verse and bawdy limericks. He also composed religious music. After a year at Princeton University, he dropped out to devote himself to composing. He studied under Howard Brockway, and spent a year visiting Finnish composer Jean Sibelius. Kernochan composed several choral and orchestral compositions, which were later recorded. He transferred to Harvard University, graduated in 1942.

His paternal grandparents were Louise Marshall (née Pollock) Kernochan and John Adams Kernochan, a brother of J. Frederic Kernochan and James Powell Kernochan.

== Career ==
When the U.S. entered World War II, he enlisted. On his way to his posting, he composed his best-known recorded song, "As I Go Riding By." Following the war he attended Columbia Law School; he subsequently became a professor there.

Kernochan, who published and encouraged such American composers as Pulitzer Prize winner Robert Ward, William Bergsma, Donald Waxman and Allen Shawn, became heavily involved while a professor at Columbia Law School as an advocate for artists' intellectual property rights. Kernochan also developed the U.S. chapter of the Association Littraire et Artistique Internationale, originally created by Victor Hugo and others to press for international authors' rights.

Kernochan directed Columbia's Legislative Drafting Research Fund from 1952 to 1969, organizing projects and studies in witness immunity, financial protection against nuclear hazards, arms control and health and air pollution regulation. He was a member of President Kennedy's Commission on the Status of Women, which helped lead to women's rights legislation in the late 1960s.

For many years, Kernochan ran his family's music publishing company, Galaxy Music Corporation, inspiring a revival of English and Italian madrigals by publishing a series edited by the Thurston Dart.

== Personal life ==
In 1941, Kernochan married Adelaide Chatfield-Taylor in Williamsburg, Virginia. She was the daughter of President Franklin D. Roosevelt's Under Secretary of Commerce and Assistant Secretary of the Treasury, Wayne Chatfield-Taylor. They were the parents of two daughters and three sons, including two-time Academy Award winning writer Sarah Kernochan.

He died at his home in Jamaica Plain, Massachusetts, on October 29, 2007.
