= George Barbour =

George Barbour may refer to:

- George Pitty Barbour (1867–1951), Australian educator, Sydney Grammar School 1888–1910, Toowoomba Grammar School headmaster 1910–1935
- George Hilton Barbour (1878–1962), Canadian politician
- George Freeland Barbour (1882–1946), Scottish Liberal politician
- George Brown Barbour, (1890–1977), British geologist, discoverer of the Xiaochangliang site
- George H. Barbour (1917–1992), American politician from New Jersey
- George Harrison Barbour (1843–1934), American businessman, industrialist, financier, and manufacturer of stoves.
- George Barbour (politician) (1615–1685), member of the colonial Massachusetts General Court
