= Hobart Chatfield-Taylor =

American novelist

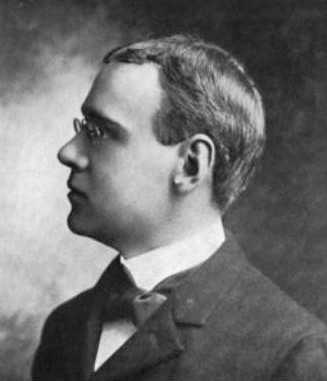
Hobart Chatfield-Taylor.

Hobart Chatfield Chatfield-Taylor (born Hobart Taylor; March 24, 1865 – January 17, 1945) was an American writer, novelist, and biographer.

== Early life ==
He was born in Chicago to Henry Hobart Taylor and Adelaide Chatfield Taylor in 1865 as Hobart Taylor, but appended the "Chatfield" to his surname as the stipulation of a large inheritance from his maternal uncle Wayne Chatfield (making his full name Hobart Chatfield Chatfield-Taylor). He graduated from Cornell University in 1886.

== Career ==
He edited a literary journal called America for a few years, and also served as consul to Spain in Chicago. He published his first novel, With Edge Tools, in 1891.

== Personal life ==
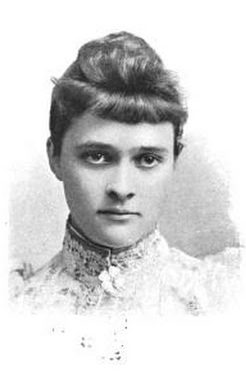
Image of his first wife, Rose Farwell, in 1901

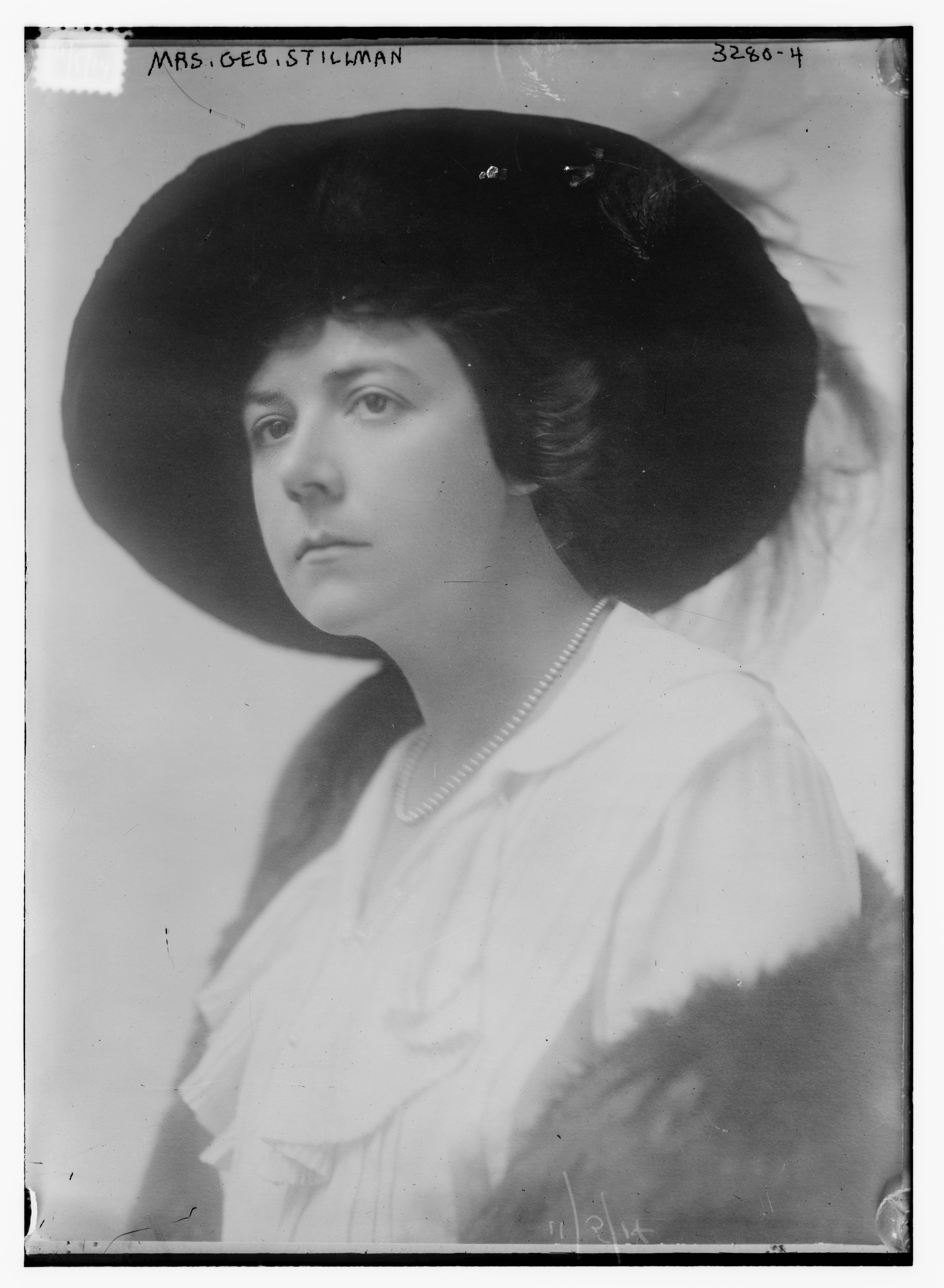
A photograph of his second wife, Estelle (née Barbour) Stillman, in 1914.

In 1890, he was married to Rose Farwell, daughter of former United States Senator Charles B. Farwell. Her sister, Anna, was the wife of composer Reginald de Koven. His wife's portrait was painted by the Swiss-born American society painter Adolfo Müller-Ury, three quarter-length in 1893 (exhibited at Knoedler's New York Gallery in February 1894), and half-length drawing on a pair of white gloves in 1894 (exhibited at Knoedler's New York Gallery in January 1895); both are unlocated. Together, they were the parents of three sons and one daughter:

- Adelaide Chatfield-Taylor (1891–1982), who married Hendricks Hallett Whitman in 1912. They divorced in 1932, and she married William Davies Sohier Jr. in 1940.
- Wayne Chatfield-Taylor (1893–1967), who served as Under Secretary of Commerce and Assistant Secretary of the Treasury under President Franklin D. Roosevelt.
- Otis Chatfield-Taylor (1899–1948), a writer, playwright, editor, theatrical producer who married Janet Benson in 1931. They divorced in 1934, and he married Marochka Borisovna Anisfeld, a daughter of Boris Anisfeld, in 1936.
- Robert Farwell Chatfield-Taylor (1908–1980), who married Valborg Edison Palmer in 1928.

After the death of his first wife in 1918, he remarried to Estelle (née Barbour) Stillman, the widow of George S. Stillman and daughter of George Harrison Barbour, in 1920.

Chatfield-Taylor died at his home in California on January 17, 1945.

== Bibliography ==
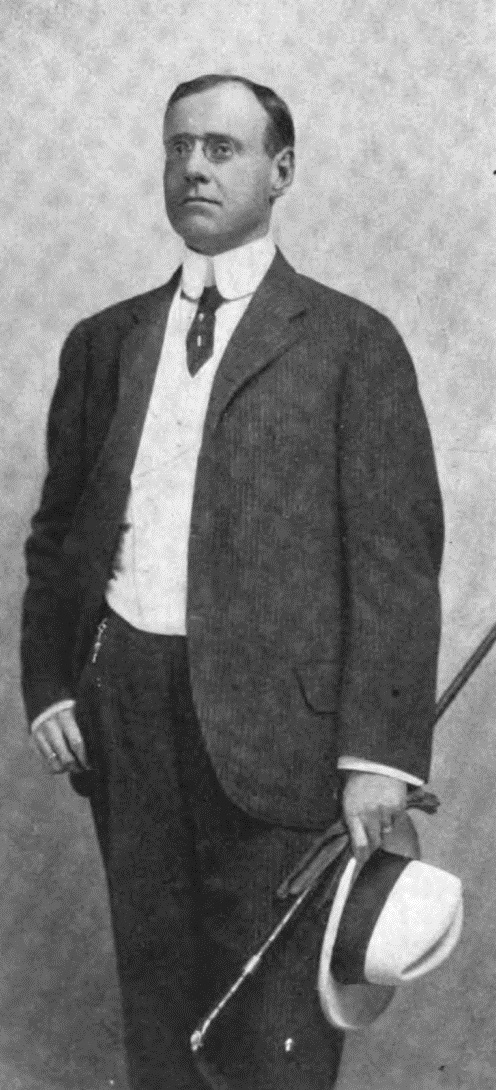
H.C. Chatfield-Taylor.

Books published by Chatfield-Taylor include:

- With Edge Tools (1891)
- An American Peeress (1893)
- Two Women and a Fool (1895)
- The Land of the Castanet: Spanish Sketches (1896)
- The Vice of Fools (1897)
- The Idle Born (1900)
- The Crimson Wing (1902)
- Molière: a biography (1906)
- Fame's Pathway (1909)
- Goldoni : a biography (1913) (on Carlo Goldoni)
- Chicago (1917)
- Cities of Many Men (1925)
- Tawny Spain (1927)
- Charmed Circles (1935)
