= Charles Farwell Edson Jr. =

American archaeologist and ancient historian (1905–1988)

Charles Farwell Edson Jr. (1905–1988) was an American scholar of Ancient History.

Charles Farwell Edson Jr. in 1936

Edson was born in Los Angeles, California, in 1905 as the son of poet and musician Charles Farwell Edson and social activist and feminist Katherine Philips Edson, and the great nephew of prominent Chicago businessman John V. Farwell and Senator Charles B. Farwell. Edson received the degree of A.B. in Classics from Stanford University in 1929 (where he already presented research talks as an undergraduate). He went on to earn his Ph.D. in history at Harvard University in 1939 with a dissertation entitled “Five Studies in Macedonian History" directed by Professor William Scott Ferguson (his dissertation research was supported by a Guggenheim Fellowship in 1936 and 1937). While a graduate student, Edson shared the driving with Alistair Cooke on a trip from the East Coast to Hollywood (at one point while Edson was driving, he ran into a cow and Cooke ended up in a hospital). During World War II, Edson served in the United States Army, eventually becoming an officer in the Office of Strategic Services. Edson taught for his entire career at the University of Wisconsin-Madison where he worked his way from Assistant Professor to Full Professor from 1938 to 1976 and was a very popular classroom instructor as well as successful graduate mentor.

Edson held another Guggenheim Fellowship from 1956 to 1957. He was awarded a Membership in the Institute for Advanced Study in Princeton, New Jersey from 1952 to 1953 and again from 1962 to 1963. He was elected a corresponding member of the German Archaeological Institute in 1972. Edson won the Goodwin Award of the American Philological Association in 1974. In 1981, some of his former students published a Festschrift, entitled Ancient Macedonian Studies in Honor of Charles F. Edson, in his honor.

Professor Edson died in Madison, Wisconsin, in 1988.

== Selected publications ==
- Charles F. Edson, “The Personal Appearance of Antigonus Gonatas,” Classical Philology 29 (1934): 254–5.
- Charles F. Edson, “The Antigonids, Heracles, and Beroea,” Harvard Studies in Classical Philology 45 (1934): 213–246.
- Charles F. Edson, “Perseus and Demetrius,” Harvard Studies in Classical Philology 46 (1935): 191–202.
- Charles F. Edson, “Notes on the Thracian Pharos,” Classical Philology 42 (1947): 88–105.
- Charles F. Edson, “Cults of Thessalonica (Macedonica III),” Harvard Theological Review 41 (1948): 153–204.
- Charles F. Edson, “The Location of Cellae and the Route of the Via Egnatia in Western Macedonia,” Classical Philology 46 (1951): 1–16.
- Charles F. Edson, “Strepsa (Thucydides 1.61.4),” Classical Philology 50 (1955): 169–90.
- Charles F. Edson, “Imperium Macedonicum: The Seleucid Empire and the Literary Evidence,” Classical Philology 53 (1958): 153–70.
- Charles F. Edson, Inscriptiones Graecae, editio minor, vol. X: Inscriptiones Epiri, Macedoniae, Thraciae, Scythiae, Pars II: Inscriptiones Macedoniae, Fasciculus I: Inscriptiones Thessalonicae et Viciniae (Berlin, 1972).
