= Mary Eveline Smith Farwell =

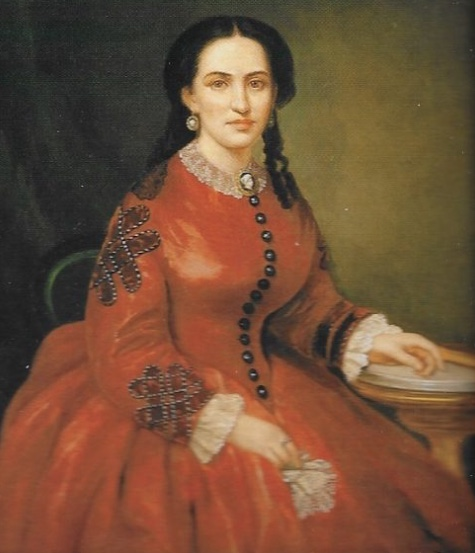
Mary Eveline Smith Farwell painted by Charles Highwood, circa 1863.

Mary Eveline Smith was born in Williamstown, Massachusetts, on June 23, 1825.

As a young woman Mary was tutored with the daughters of Mark Hopkins, a key architect of the American college ideal, in Williamstown, Massachusetts. She enrolled at Pittsfield Young Ladies' Institute (Massachusetts) in 1842 and taught English, Latin, and History there between 1848 and 1850. In October 1853 she married Charles B. Farwell. They lived in Chicago, Illinois and were the parents of nine children, four of which survived to adulthood: Anna (b. 1860), Walter (b. 1863), Grace (b. 1867), Rose (b. 1870). From 1853 to 1861 Charles B. Farwell served as the Clerk of Cook County; he went on to serve as a member of the U.S. House of Representatives in the 42nd, 43rd, 44th, and 47th Congresses (1871–1876, 1881–1883), and as U.S. Senator (1887 to 1891).

The family began spending summers in Lake Forest in the 1960s, and in 1870 moved into their own Lake Forest residence named "Fairlawn." In 1876 Mary established Lake Forest College as a co-educational division of Lake Forest University (founded 1857), motivated by desire to provide her daughters a college-level education. She ensured Charles funded purchase of the defunct Lake Forest Hotel building for classrooms and dormitory space. She hired College faculty and gave scholarships to Chicago high school students, and remained a benefactor to the college until her 1905 death in Lake Forest at age 81. The college opened September 1876 with three faculty and a class of twelve students, including Mary's daughter Anna.

Mary was a member of the Fourth Presbyterian Church of Chicago, and Secretary and Treasurer of the Women's Presbyterian Board of Foreign Missions.
