= John V. Le Moyne =

American politician

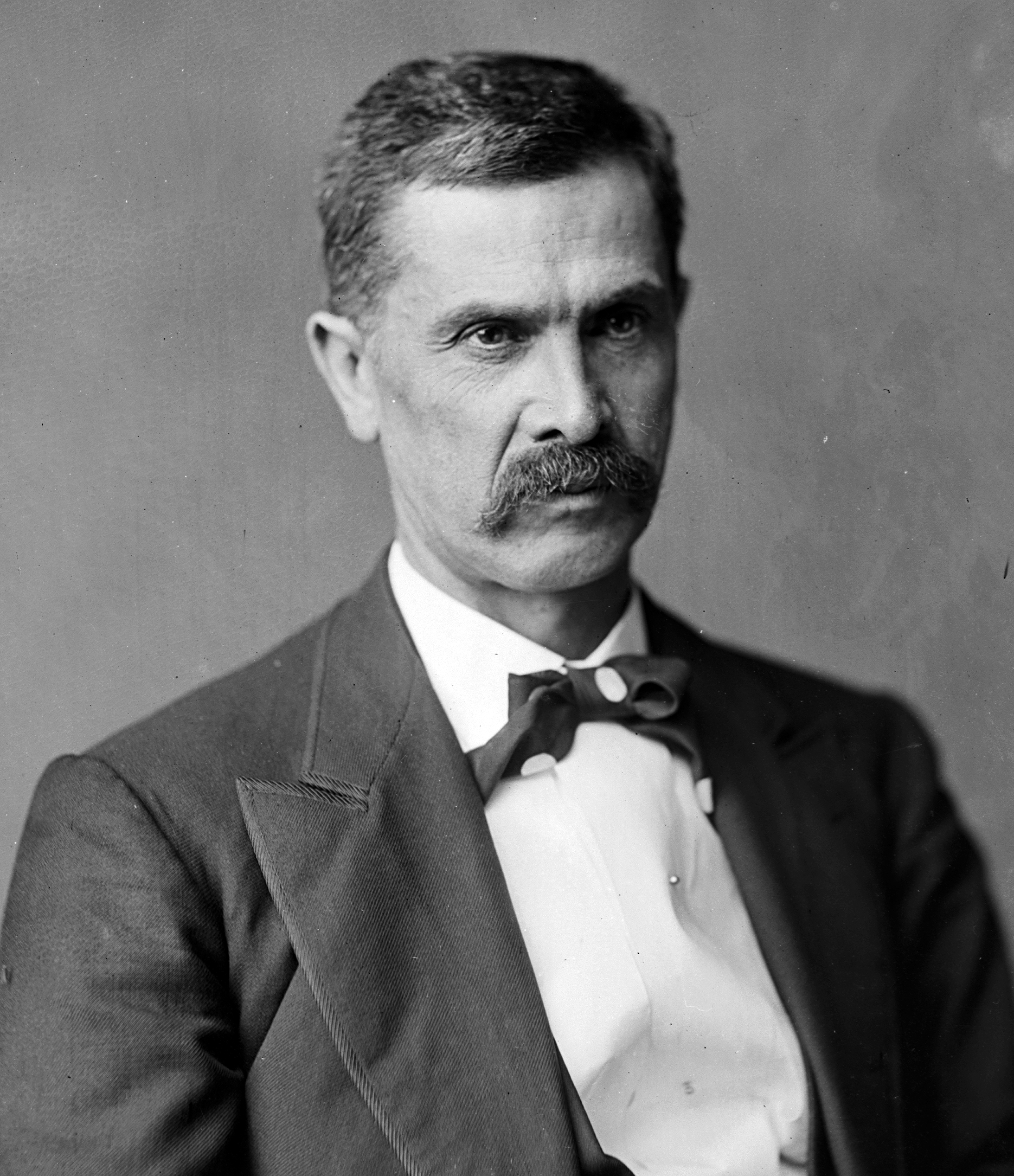

Member of the U.S. House of Representatives from Illinois's 3rd district
- In office May 6, 1876 – March 3, 1877
- Preceded by: Charles B. Farwell
- Succeeded by: Lorenzo Brentano

Personal details
- Born: John Valcoulon Le Moyne; November 17, 1828 Washington, Pennsylvania, U.S.
- Died: July 27, 1918 (aged 89) Baltimore, Maryland, U.S.
- Party: Democratic
- Parents: Francis Julius LeMoyne (father); Madeleine Romaine Bureau (mother)

John Valcoulon Le Moyne (November 17, 1828 – July 27, 1918) was a U.S. Representative from Illinois.

== Life and career ==
Le Moyne was born in Washington, Pennsylvania, the son of Madeleine Romaine (Bureau) and Francis Julius LeMoyne. Le Moyne attended the common schools. He was graduated from Washington & Jefferson College, Washington, Pennsylvania, in 1847. He studied law. He was admitted to the bar in Pittsburgh, Pennsylvania, in 1852. He moved to Chicago, Illinois the same year and commenced practice. He was an unsuccessful candidate of the Liberal Party for election in 1872 to the Forty-third Congress. He successfully contested as a Democrat the election of Charles B. Farwell to the Forty-fourth Congress and served from May 6, 1876, to March 3, 1877. He was an unsuccessful candidate for reelection in 1876 to the Forty-fifth Congress. He resumed the practice of law in Chicago. He retired in 1887 and moved to Baltimore, Maryland, where he resided until his death. He was interred in Washington Cemetery, Washington, Pennsylvania.

His wife, Julia N. Murray, was the daughter of politician Magnus Miller Murray. Le Moyne is the great-great-grandfather of actress Julie Bowen.

U.S. House of Representatives
Preceded by Charles B. Farwell	Member of the U.S. House of Representatives from Illinois's 3rd congressional district 1876-1877	Succeeded by Lorenzo Brentano
