= Charles B. Farwell =

American politician

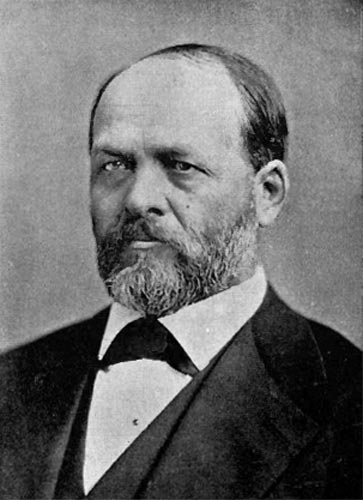
- Farwell in 1892

United States Senator from Illinois
- In office January 19, 1887 – March 3, 1891
- Preceded by: John A. Logan
- Succeeded by: John M. Palmer

Member of the U.S. House of Representatives from Illinois
- In office March 4, 1871 – May 6, 1876
- Preceded by: Norman B. Judd (1st); Horatio C. Burchard (3rd)
- Succeeded by: John B. Rice (1st); John V. Le Moyne (3rd)
- Constituency: 1st district (1871-73); 3rd district (1873-76)
- In office March 4, 1881 – March 3, 1883
- Preceded by: Hiram Barber, Jr.
- Succeeded by: George R. Davis
- Constituency: 3rd district

5th Cook County Clerk
- In office 1853–1861
- Preceded by: Edmund S. Kimberly
- Succeeded by: Laurin P. Hilliard

Personal details
- Born: Charles Benjamin Farwell; July 1, 1823 Painted Post, New York, US
- Died: September 23, 1903 (aged 80) Lake Forest, Illinois, US
- Resting place: Rosehill Cemetery
- Party: Republican
- Spouse: Mary Eveline Smith
- Relations: John V. Farwell (brother); Charles Farwell Edson (nephew); Charles Farwell Edson, Jr. (great-nephew); Wayne Chatfield-Taylor (grandson); Meg Whitman (great-great-granddaughter); Sarah Kernochan (great-great granddaughter)
- Education: Elmira Academy

Charles Benjamin Farwell (July 1, 1823 – September 23, 1903) was a U.S. representative and senator from Illinois.

== Early life ==
Farwell was born in Painted Post, New York on July 1, 1823. He was a son of Henry Farwell (1795–1873) and Nancy (née Jackson) Farwell (1798–1887). His younger siblings included John Villiers Farwell, Simeon Farwell, and Louise Farwell (mother-in-law of Katherine Philips Edson and grandmother of Charles Farwell Edson, Jr.).

He attended Elmira Academy before moving to Illinois in 1838.

== Career ==
He first tried his hand at surveying and farming before moving to Chicago in 1844, when he went into banking. From 1853 to 1861, he served as the Clerk of Cook County. Farwell was "one of the principal builders in [Chicago's] business district" in the last quarter of the 19th century. That he was able to amass a sizeable fortune can be proven by the fact that he owned a mansion on Chicago's North Side.

=== Political career ===
Elected to the U.S. House of Representatives four times beginning in 1870, winning his first election to the House by a healthy margin over Chicago's "Long" John Wentworth (by some 5700 votes). Farwell went on to serve in the House of Representatives in the 42nd, 43rd, 44th and 47th Congresses. In 1876, the Democrat-controlled Congress accepted John V. Le Moyne's challenge to Farwell's election and removed Farwell from office; Farwell declined to run again at the time of the general election later on in 1876. In 1880, he was elected to another term in Congress (the 47th Congress). Upon the death of John A. Logan in 1887, Farwell was elected to serve out Logan's term in the U.S. Senate, but refused to run for re-election to a full term.

Significantly, in Farwell's first term as Senator, he supported the introduction of an amendment to the U.S. Constitution that would have granted women's suffrage rights (the right to vote) - simultaneously a landmark achievement of and a setback in the long struggle for voting rights for women that would not be overcome until the adoption of the Nineteenth Amendment to the United States Constitution in 1920.

=== Later life ===
In 1879, Farwell and his brother John were part of a group of Illinois businessmen and politicians responsible for construction of the Texas State Capitol building. The Farwell's reward for this was to become owners of over 3 million acres of land in Texas, upon which they founded the XIT Ranch. The city of Farwell, Texas is named for the Farwell brothers.

== Personal life ==
In 1852, Farwell was married to Mary Eveline Smith, a New Englander who received a private education. Together, they were the parents of nine children, only four of whom lived to adulthood:

- Charles Farwell (1853–1853), who died young.
- Mary N. Farwell (1854–1861), who died young.

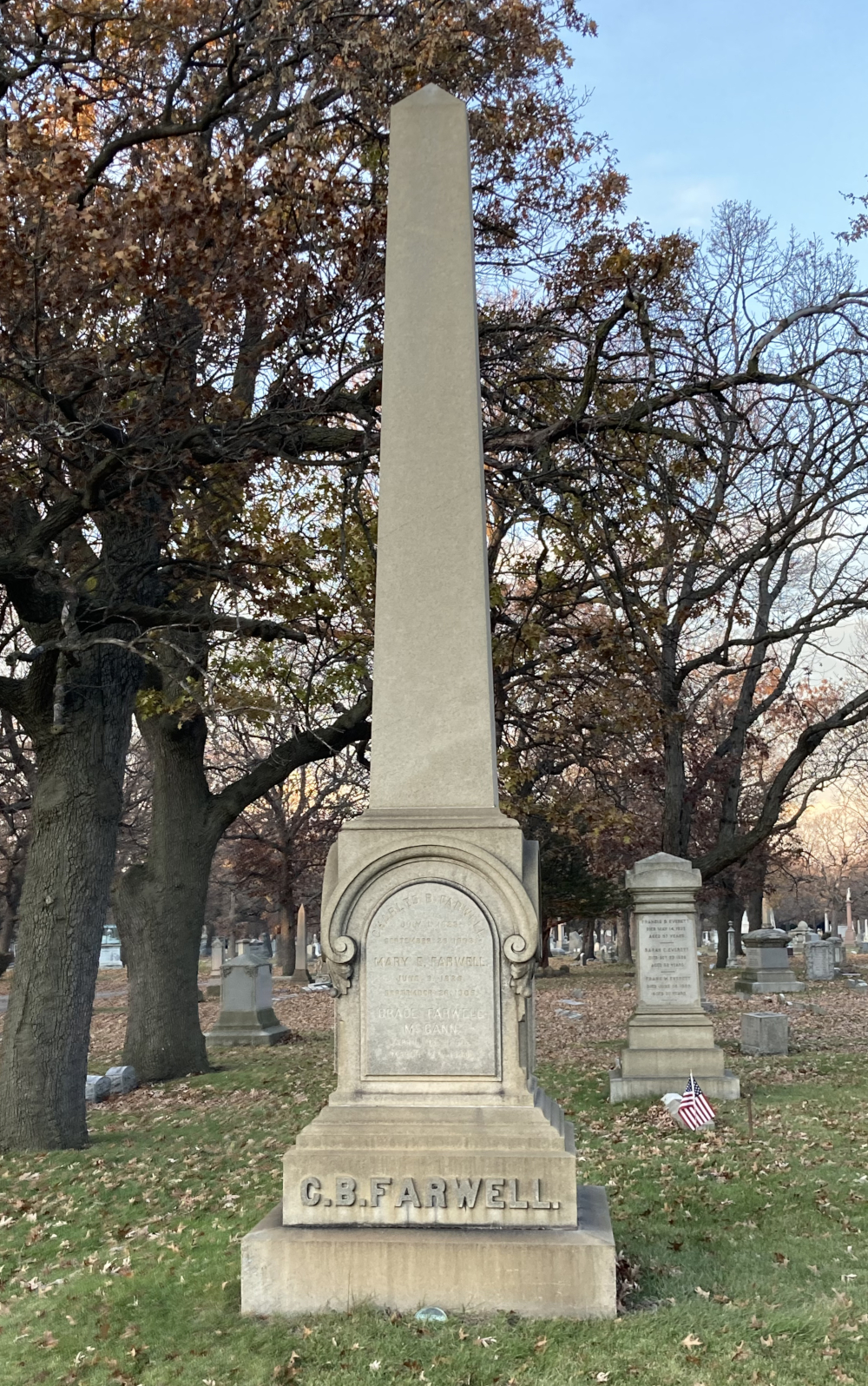
Farwell's grave at Rosehill Cemetery

- Henry Farwell (1856–1861), who died young.
- Edward Farwell (1858–1864), who died young.
- Anna Farwell (1860–1953), who married composer Reginald de Koven.
- Walter C. Farwell (1863–1943), who married Mildred Mary Williams, a daughter of Gen. Robert Williams.
- Grace Farwell (1868–1949), who married Dudley Winston, a son of U.S. Minister Frederick Hampden Winston in 1888. After his death, she married Robert Greaves McGann (1867–1953) in 1906.
- Robert Farwell (1870–1872), who died young.
- Rose Farwell (1870–1918), who married author Hobart Chatfield-Taylor. Rose founded the Onwentsia Club one her father's estate.

After a long illness, Farwell died in Lake Forest, Illinois on September 23, 1903. He was buried at Rosehill Cemetery in Chicago.

His daughter Rose inherited his estate, Fairlawn, at 965 E. Deerpath in Lake Forest. Upon her death in 1918, his other daughter Grace inherited the mansion, and when it burned in 1920, the McGanns hired New York architects Delano and Aldrich to rebuild it in a Federal style with neo-Palladian brick and was finished in 1923 with original landscape was designed by Frederick Law Olmsted.

=== Descendants ===
Through his daughter Anna, he was a grandfather of Ethel Leroy De Koven (1885–1943), who married broker Hans Kierstede Hudson. Through his daughter Grace, he was a grandfather of Grace Farwell McGann (1907–1949), who married James H. Douglas Jr., the Secretary of the Air Force and the Deputy Secretary of Defense (his father helped found the Quaker Oats Company).

Through his youngest daughter Rose, he was a grandfather of four: Adelaide Chatfield-Taylor (1891–1982), who was awarded a Croix de Guerre for her work running a canteen in Boston during World War II, (grandmother of politician and businesswoman Meg Whitman); Wayne Chatfield-Taylor (1893–1967), who served as Under Secretary of Commerce and Assistant Secretary of the Treasury under President Franklin D. Roosevelt; and Otis Chatfield-Taylor (1899–1948), a writer, playwright, editor, theatrical producer; and Robert Farwell Chatfield-Taylor (1908–1980).

=== Philanthropy ===
In 1876, at his wife's urging, Farwell underwrote the construction of College Hall, North Hall and a gymnasium at Lake Forest College. The couple also donated additional land to the college which had been struggling since the end of the Civil War. Part of their philanthropy was to ensure a co-ed liberal arts college near home for their daughter, Anna, who graduated from Lake Forest College in 1880. Anna later married the composer Reginald de Koven, and became a successful socialite, novelist and amateur historian. His daughter Rose was married to Hobart Chatfield-Taylor.

== See also ==
- XIT Ranch

U.S. House of Representatives
Preceded by Norman B. Judd	Member of the U.S. House of Representatives from Illinois's 1st congressional district 1871–1873	Succeeded by John Blake Rice
Preceded by Horatio C. Burchard	Member of the U.S. House of Representatives from Illinois's 3rd congressional district 1873–1876	Succeeded by John V. Le Moyne
Preceded by Hiram Barber, Jr.	Member of the U.S. House of Representatives from Illinois's 3rd congressional district 1881–1883	Succeeded by George R. Davis
U.S. Senate
Preceded by John A. Logan	U.S. senator (Class 3) from Illinois; 1887–1891; Served alongside: Shelby M. Cullom	Succeeded by John M. Palmer
