= Spinning (IPO) =

Spinning (IPO) is the act or practice of an investment bank offering under-priced shares of a company's initial public offerings to the senior executives of a third party company in exchange for future business with the investment bank. This conflict of interest was a relatively common way for investment banks to attract new clients in the past, but has since been prohibited. Those opposed to the practice liken IPO spinning to a disguised form of corporate bribery and believe that it cheats two classes of investors:

- The shareholders in the third-party company who are unable to receive similar favorable IPO terms as those received by its senior executives, and that constitutes a breach of fiduciary duty to shareholders required of the company's senior executives, specifically that they not use their corporate office to extract favors that are not shared equally by all shareholders.
- The retail shareholder public who are compelled to purchase large sizes of stock in an IPO at exorbitant prices from the special favored executive friends of the brokerage underwriting the IPO.

== See also ==
- Flipping
