= Katherine Philips Edson =

American reformer and social activist

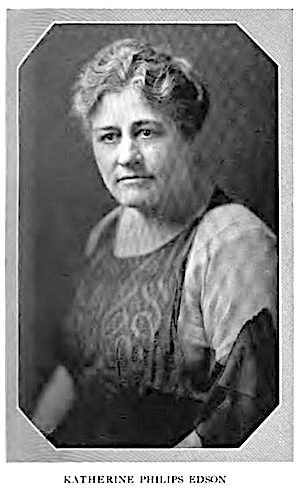
Katherine Philips Edson, in a 1922 publication.

Katherine Philips Edson (January 12, 1870 – November 5, 1933) was an American reformer and social activist who had a key role in changing the labor conditions in California and across the nation.

== Biography ==
Katherine Philips was born in Ohio in 1870. Her father was a Union surgeon in the civil war who was also a strong supporter of women's rights. Katherine studied in Kenton, Ohio where she attended several public schools. During her earlier years, she studied at the Convent of Sacred Heart in Clifton. She then left to Chicago in order to receive the voice training that she wanted. While in Chicago, she attended the Chicago Conservatory, where she also met Charles Farwell Edson, who eventually became her husband in 1890 (they divorced in the year 1925). Edson was the nephew of prominent Chicago businessman John V. Farwell and Senator Charles B. Farwell. Soon after getting married, Katherine and Charles moved to Antelope Valley, California where she spent the next nine years. Katherine became the active leader in the Women's Suffrage Movements while residing in Antelope Valley. Katherine and her husband eventually decided to move to Los Angeles, California where she joined the Friday Morning Club in the year 1900. The Friday Morning club was a women's club founded by Caroline M. Severance. This club had over three thousand members at the time. The Friday Morning Club advocated for public reforms and organized local health campaigns. Katherine became secretary of the Friday Morning club within a year of being an active member. While a member of the club, Katherine worked on municipal reforms and she was a key component in the women suffrage amendment that was added to the state constitution in 1911. Edson strongly believed that women had important interests outside of their household work and it was their task to stand up against unhealthy conditions. She also believed that women should be treated as full citizens of the United States rather than half citizens. Edson's political activism led her to make changes within our legislation. She pushed for better working conditions as well as women's rights. The unfair treatment of women outside of their household duties, led Katherine Edson to actively fight for women's rights. Even after her death, Edson's work continued to influence activists around the United States to stand up against social injustice.

== Industrial Welfare Commission ==
Katherine believed that “she was born to be a politician”. Her household was filled with politically minded individuals who influenced her early participation in different social activist groups. Her father was a member of the Constitutional Convention of 1873 and supported women suffrage movements; some of which Katherine later fought for. Katherine considered her father to be the reason why she began advocating for women worker rights at an early age. Edson strived to make the nation just and fair for the “whole community engaged in the common enterprise of taking care of its own life.” Edson was prepared to accept partial solutions to the problems she aimed to resolve.

In 1912, Edson was elected into the Council of the National Municipal League, where she worked alongside Meyer Lissner. Lissner served as Edson's political mentor and appointed her to the Bureau of Labor Statistics in 1912. Despite having to focus on the issue of public education, Edson decided to spend more of her time focusing on women's health and working conditions. She helped draft the Federation's first legislative platform and then in the year 1913 she joined the Women's Legislative Council of California. Edson and about a dozen other women urged legislators and federated clubs to discuss and support measures such as the minimum wage for women.

In 1913, she asked the president of each club in the California Federation of Women's Club to appoint a committee that would survey the community's industrial wage hours and working conditions. The survey was meant to inform other women's groups of the dire working conditions and the need for legislature to resolve these issues. While the commissioners and clubs investigated the working conditions, Katherine was busy pushing the 1913 Assembly Bill 1251, which was the minimum wage bill. Edson argued that “our potential motherhood” must be paid living wages.” The supporters of Bill 1251 included Women’s Clubs, churches, and early prohibitionists. This became the most powerful political coalition of the time and displaced racetrack owners. Bill 1251, however, was not supported by the labor unions. Organized labor did not want its own advocacy to be threatened by the proponents of this bill. Many of the unions were concentrated within the San Francisco area and were heavily influenced by the Catholics who at the time supported patriarchy. Labor leaders refrained from having any women workers because they feared that by creating better working conditions, the labor unions would no longer be required. The opposing views and legislatures lack of action left this Bill without action. Governor Johnson pushed the Bill five days before deferment. This bill was passed by forty-six to twelve votes. Edson’s strong activism had proven to be successful in the passing of the 1251 Bill.

One of California’s most significant events came after the second decade of the twentieth century, when the progressive Republican’s rose to power. Hiram Johnson, the leading American progressive during the time, vowed to “kick the Southern Pacific Railroad out of the Republican Party” and to return state control to the voters to enact legislation for the greater good of society. To achieve these progressive goals, commissions were set up in order to investigate working conditions amongst other industrial accidents. By 1913 the legislature created the first Industrial Welfare Commission (IWC), whose task was to investigate the working conditions and wages of both women and children. This legislation was greatly supported by Katherine Philips Edson who was the most influential member during the time. Katherine Edson was the first woman to be appointed to the IWC as an executive committee officer, serving for nearly eighteen years (1916–1931). A lot of the accomplishments of the IWC, during the first couple of years were due to Edson's social activism. Edson drafted bills and lobbied legislature, gaining the support of many different women's groups. Additionally, under Edson's leadership a lot of the employers came to agreements with the employees during the advisory wage boards that she usually chaired.

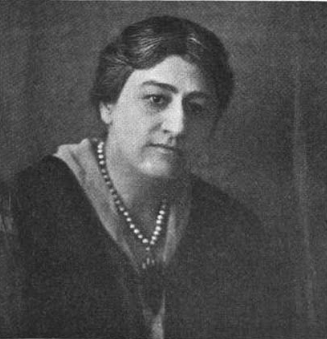
Katherine Philips Edson, 1921

With the IWC women in the United States benefited from the highest minimum wage. Working conditions were dramatically improved and the eight-hour working days were enforced. The IWC brought order where order was needed within the labor markets. Although successful, the IWC also had failures, which was most noticeable from 1921–1922. During this year, the lowering of the minimum wage had to be reversed multiple times. The Industrial Welfare Commission also failed to maintain compliance of the Southern California canners. Although the southern canners only accounted for about 15% of production, some of their northern counterparts stopped complying as well.

In 1931, as a result of the depression, the IWC's leadership was questioned. The agricultural industries were the ones with most women employment but they were also the hardest to regulate. The agricultural industries gained exclusion from the eight-hour law because of their “volatility typical of agricultural commodities and seasonal labor.” The IWC attempted to use various methods in attempting to regulate the agricultural industries. One method enforced by the IWC was the canning audit, which allowed businesses some freedom while protecting their worker's interests and keeping regulatory costs to a bare minimum.

During the last months of the year 1915, Edson published a thirty-seven-page study of The Cost of Living. The Industrial Welfare Commission (IWC) interviewed about one thousand workingwomen. During these interviews, women were asked to assess their weekly salaries compared to the prices of clothing, food, and other necessities. From the gathered reports, Edson calculated that the cost of living was roughly $9.63 per week. The Bureau of Labor Statistics proved that half of the working women earned less than nine dollars a week.

Soon after World War I, the cost of living according to the Bureau of Labor Statistics continued to increase. In 1920, another study was done, which resulted in the adoption of the sixteen-dollar minimum and an amendment of wage orders. By 1921, businesses slowed down in production and employers complained that the sixteen-dollar minimum was too high. The California Manufacturers’ Association petitioned for a hearing and forced the minimum wage of sixteen-dollars to be reevaluated. Other employers also joined the California Manufacturers’ Association and petitioned for a lower wage. A general wage board was established and it was supposed to recommend a minimum wage for all industries. Instead, the employers and employees caused an impasse. The commission called upon the wage board once again to see if agreement might be reached. Edson went against the pressures of business owners to reduce minimum wage but she agreed to a compromise. She reevaluated the costs of living and her calculations now led her to a fifteen-dollar minimum. The IWC accepted her newly proposed minimum wage but not without resentment from the labor.

Leaders of the California State Federation of Labor criticized Edson's fifteen-dollar minimum for women workers, when she earned eighty-four dollars a week. The California State Federation filed a lawsuit to recover the money she had earned while in the six years she held an executive position. The masses demanded Edson's replacement. Katherine Edson conducted another study once more in order to keep up with the fluctuating costs of living. In September 1922 businessmen agreed to pass the sixteen-dollar wage and in December, the commission reestablished the sixteen-dollar minimum wage. The economic effect of this was better for employers than a lower minimum wage.

== Last years and death ==
At the age of forty-nine, Edson had an operation in order to control blood supply to the brain. Edson was not able to return to work until after six months. In 1923, Edson's husband told her that their relationship was no longer worth keeping, and he left her. In the last half of 1923, a lump was found on her breast which was later removed and it recurred. In 1924, she was once again hospitalized due to a kidney malfunction. In 1926 and at the young age of 56, Edson suffered two severe heart attacks, and also suffered from gallstones. Edson was very ill during the 1930 campaign, and Rolph appointed a new head of the Division of Industrial Welfare, and legislature passed a bill, which caused Edson's termination. The newly appointed IWC head, was Mrs. Mabbel E. Kinney, who caused all of Edson's work to go to waste. Mrs. Kinney, lowered the wage standards that Edson had fought hard to maintain, causing the IWC to go inactive. Between 1923 and 1933 (her death) Edson's health had severely deteriorated. Edson advised Kinney and continued to lobby for the League of Women Voter's in order to press for a larger IWC budget. She remained politically active and was asked in 1933 to accept the job of writing the National Recovery Administration's canning code but was too ill to accept it. Katherine Philips Edson died on November 5, 1933.

== See also ==
- List of suffragists and suffragettes
