= Rose Farwell Chatfield-Taylor =

American sportswoman and suffragist (1870–1918)

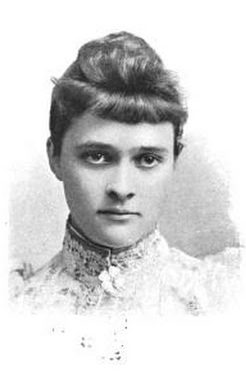
- Chatfield-Taylor in 1901
- Born: Rose Farwell; March 7, 1870; Lake Forest, Illinois, U.S.
- Died: April 5, 1918 (aged 48); Santa Barbara, California, U.S.
- Education: Ferry Hall School; Lake Forest College
- Occupations: Socialite, sportswoman
- Spouse: Hobart Chatfield-Taylor (m. 1890)
- Children: 4, including Wayne
- Parent(s): Charles B. Farwell; Mary Eveline Smith Farwell
- Relatives: Anna de Koven (sister)

Rose Farwell Chatfield-Taylor (March 7, 1870 – April 5, 1918) was an American sportswoman, bookbinder, suffragist, and socialite, and co-founder of a golf club in Illinois named Onwentsia.

== Early life ==
Rose Farwell was born a twin in Lake Forest, Illinois, the daughter of Charles Benjamin Farwell and Mary Eveline Smith Farwell. Her father was a United States Senator from Illinois. She and her older sisters Anna de Koven and Grace were considered fashionable beauties in Chicago society, and all enjoyed various sports. Anna became a novelist, and married composer Reginald de Koven. Grace became the first president of the Art Institute of Chicago.

Rose attended Ferry Hall and Lake Forest College for her schooling. Portraits of Rose Farwell as a young woman were painted by John Elliott and Adolfo Müller-Ury.

== Career ==
Because of Rose's and her new husband's interest in golf, the family arranged for Charles B. MacDonald to design a golf course in 1892. In 1895, Rose Farwell Chatfield-Taylor and her husband were among the founders of the Onwentsia Club, a golf club in Lake Forest. She won several golf events, owned a racehorse, and played lawn tennis. She was a clubwoman, and served as vice president of the Northside Chicago branch of the Illinois Woman Suffrage League.

The Chatfield-Taylors were also members of the "Little Room", a social gathering of artists, writers, and performers. They kept studios in the Fine Arts Building on Michigan Avenue, where Rose Chatfield-Taylor ran a bookbinding business called the Rose Bindery, "a shop where books were appreciated and clothed in beautiful and appropriate bindings." She learned the craft in Paris, and was a member of the Guild of Bookworkers from 1906 to 1910. She wrote about bookbinding for the Sketch Book magazine.

== Personal life ==
In 1890, Rose Farwell married wealthy writer, social host, and sportsman Hobart Chatfield-Taylor. Together, they were the parents of three sons and one daughter:

- Adelaide Chatfield-Taylor (1891–1982), who was awarded a Croix de Guerre for her work running a canteen in Boston during World War II. She married Hendricks Hallett Whitman in 1912. They divorced in 1932, and she married William Davies Sohier Jr. in 1940. Her granddaughter is politician and businesswoman Meg Whitman.
- Wayne Chatfield-Taylor (1893–1967), who served as Under Secretary of Commerce and Assistant Secretary of the Treasury under President Franklin D. Roosevelt.
- Otis Chatfield-Taylor (1899–1948), a writer, playwright, editor, theatrical producer who married Janet Benson in 1931. They divorced in 1934, and he married Marochka Borisovna Anisfeld, a daughter of Boris Anisfeld, in 1936.
- Robert Farwell Chatfield-Taylor (1908–1980), who married Valborg Edison Palmer in 1928.

She died in Santa Barbara in 1918, aged 48 years, from pneumonia after an appendectomy. In her memory, her sisters funded a visiting nurse position in Chicago, beginning in the fall of 1918. Her sister's book, A Cloud of Witnesses (1920), recounts Anna de Koven's efforts to contact the spirit of the late Rose Farwell Chatfield-Taylor.
