= George S. Stillman =

American football player and coach (1879–1907)

Biographical details
- Born: December 13, 1879; Brookline, Massachusetts, U.S.
- Died: March 15, 1907 (aged 27); New York, New York, U.S.

Playing career
- 1898–1900: Yale
- Position: Tackle

Coaching career (HC unless noted)
- 1901: Yale

Head coaching record
- Overall: 11–1–1

Accomplishments and honors

Championships
- National (1900) – selected 20+ years after Stillman's death

Awards
- 2× Consensus All-American (1899, 1900)

George Schley Stillman (December 13, 1879 – March 15, 1907) was an American football player and coach. He played college football at Yale University where he was selected as a first-team All-American at the tackle position in both 1899 and 1900. Stillman coached the 1901 Yale football team to a record of 11–1–1. Stillman died at age 27 after contracting typhoid fever.

== Early years ==
Stillman was born in Brookline, Massachusetts, in December 1879. He was the son of Joseph F. Stillman, a sugar refiner, and Eliza M. (Schley) Stillman. He attended preparatory school at St. Paul's School in Concord, New Hampshire and moved with his family to New York City in 1898.

== Yale ==
Stillman subsequently enrolled at Yale University. While attending Yale, he played for the Yale Bulldogs football team from 1898 to 1900. He played at the tackle position for Yale and was selected as a first-team All-American in 1899 and 1900. He received the first-team All-American honors each year from Walter Camp for Collier's Weekly and from Leslie's Weekly. Stillman was one of the leaders of the 1900 Yale team that finished its season with a perfect 13–0 record, outscoring opponents by a combined score of 336 to 10. After Yale ended its season with a 28–0 victory over Harvard, The New York Times wrote that the 1900 Yale team "was without question the strongest team that has been on the field since the Princeton team of 1889."

Stillman was also a member of Yale's track team and rowed for Yale's varsity crew.

After graduating from Yale in 1901, Stillman returned in the fall of 1901 as the head coach of Yale's football team. He led the team to a record of 11–1–1 in his one season as head coach.

During the period from 1899 to 1912, Yale had 14 different head football coaches in 14 years – despite compiling a combined record of 127–11–10 in those years. For that 14-year span, the Yale football team has been recognized retrospectively (except for the contemporaneous Whitney) as the national championship team by one or more of the major national championship selectors for six seasons – 1900 (Billingsley, Helms, Houlgate, National Championship Foundation, Parke Davis), 1902 (Parke Davis), 1905 (Parke Davis, Whitney), 1906 (Billingsley, Parke Davis, Whitney), 1907 (Billingsley, Helms, Houlgate, National Championship Foundation, Parke Davis, Whitney), and 1909 (Billingsley, Helms, Houlgate, National Championship Foundation, Parke Davis). An erroneous source includes 1901. (Note: Parke Davis' selection for 1901, as published in Spalding's Foot Ball Guide (to which he was a contributor until his death) for 1934 and 1935, was Harvard.) (Note: The NCAA Records Book states "Yale" for 1901, which is an error that has been perpetuated since the first appearance of Parke Davis' selections in the NCAA book about 1995.)

== Later years ==
Stillman subsequently entered the banking business, first with the Ladenburg, Thalmann & Co., and then as a founding member of Rosen, Stillman & Co. in New York. In April 1906, he married Estelle Barbour of Detroit, Michigan, at New York's Fort Street Presbyterian Church. He contracted typhoid fever in June 1906, which later developed into meningitis. He died in March 1907 at age 27.

== Head coaching record ==
Year	Team	Overall	Conference	Standing	Bowl/playoffs
Yale Bulldogs (Independent) (1901)
1901	Yale	11–1–1			
Yale:		11–1–1			
Total:		11–1–1			
National championship Conference title Conference division title or championship game berth
