= George Harrison Barbour =

American businessman

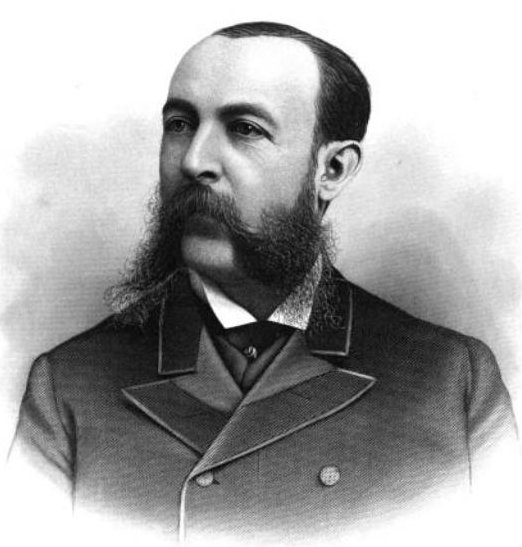
- Circa 1890
- Born: June 26, 1843; Collinsville, Connecticut
- Died: March 28, 1934 (aged 90); Grosse Pointe Farms, Michigan
- Occupations: businessman, industrialist, founder & director of firms
- Spouse: Katherine Louise Hawley (m. 1869)
- Children: 4

George Harrison Barbour (June 26, 1843 – March 28, 1934) was an American businessman, industrialist, financier, and manufacturer of stoves in Detroit, Michigan. He received his initial exposure to the business world while still a young boy at his father's grocery store. He was associated with many civil society organizations and international exhibitions.

Barbour was director and president of many Michigan manufacturing firms, and a member on the board of directors of several banks, insurance firms, and other enterprises throughout the United States. He was a key executive with the Michigan Stove Company.

== Early life ==
Barbour was born in Collinsville, Connecticut, on June 26, 1843. His parents were Samuel Thompson and Phoebe (née Beckwith) Barbour. Thomas Barber, who immigrated in 1634, was his first New World ancestor. He settled in Simsbury, Connecticut, and built the first church in nearby Windsor. Jane, his wife, was the first white woman to be married in Connecticut. The family name changed from "Barber" to "Barbour" by the time George was born. He was the youngest of six children in the family; he had two older brothers and three older sisters.

Barbour began his education in the public schools in and around Collinsville and started helping his father in a general store there when he was nine years old. He would attend school the first part of the day and assisted his father at the store for the remainder. In 1861 he became a partner in the store business. A year later his father retired and sold his portion of the business to George's brother-in-law, Julius Earl Goodman. Barbour was nineteen years old when it was renamed Goodman & Barbour. The business sold general merchandise such as dry goods, groceries, shoes, boots, hats and other miscellaneous items. Barbour succeeded in running the general store and in two years paid off the debt to his father for the partnership share. A year later he purchased Goodman's share and fully owned the store; Barbour ran the store business alone until 1872.

== Michigan Stove Company ==
Barbour was interested in a newly formed foundry business in 1871 called the Michigan Stove Company. The following year, he negotiated with the founder Jeremiah Dwyer to buy an interest in the company, sold the general store in Collinsville, and moved to Detroit, becoming the secretary and sales manager of Dwyer's business. The sales department at that time consisted of only one other salesman besides himself. He and his co-worker sold stoves only to dealers in small towns in Michigan.

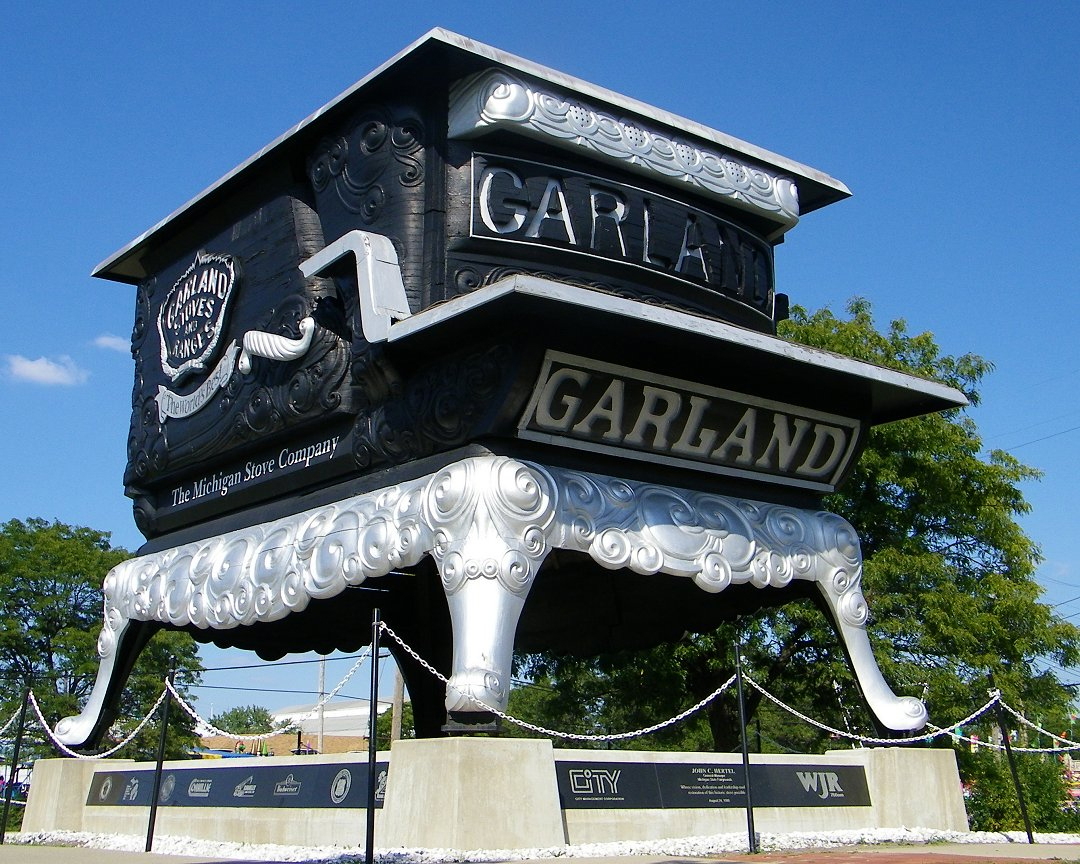
World's Largest Stove, which was destroyed by lightning in 2011

=== World's Largest Stove ===
The Michigan Stove Company built the World's Largest Stove for the 1893 Chicago World's Fair. While on the national board of the Chicago Fair, Barbour came up with the idea to build a giant Garland kitchen range to represent the company at the fair and passed it on to Dwyer. It was carved and painted to look just like a metal stove. The company superintendent William J. Keep designed the replica.

=== Promotion to chairman of the board ===
Barbour continued to work as the secretary and sales manager of the company until 1886 when he became vice president and general manager. He then became president of the business in 1919 and chairman of the board in 1921. Barbour executed a merger with the Detroit Stove Works in 1925 to then become the largest manufacturer of stoves in the world.

== Memberships and affiliations ==
Barbour was involved with many commercial interests in Detroit and throughout Michigan. He organized the Michigan Copper & Brass Company in 1907. He was its president until 1914, when he resigned and sold off his shares. Barbour was also president of the Ireland & Mathews Manufacturing Company and the vice president of the Dime Savings Bank and First National Bank. He was a director of the Peoples State Bank, a director of the Michigan Fire & Marine Insurance Company, and president of the National Association of Stove Manufacturers during 1888–90. Barbour was chairman of the legislative committee in 1902 of the National Association of Manufacturers.

Barbour became associated with many civil associations and organizations throughout the United States. He represented the state of Michigan at the 1893 Chicago World's Fair, the Tennessee Centennial and International Exposition of 1897, and the 1901 Pan-American Exposition in Buffalo, New York. Barbour was active in organizing the Detroit Exposition of 1889. He was the first president of the Detroit Board of Commerce and the Michigan Manufacturers Association, the chairman of the legislative committee of the National Association of Manufacturers in 1902, and a director of the Chamber of Commerce of the United States in 1919.

Barbour was a conservative Democrat and belonged to the Fellow Craft Club, the Detroit Athletic Club, and the Country Club of Detroit. At one time he was president of the Detroit Museum of Art., a member of the Board of Aldermen from the Fourth Ward of Detroit in 1886, and as a member of the Mackinac Island State Park Commission for several terms.

== Personal life ==
Barbour married Katherine Louise Hawley in Collinsville on June 26, 1869. They had four children: Edwin (b. 1870), Grace (b. 1874), Estella (b. 1878), and George Jr. (b. 1880). Barbour liked trout fishing and was fond of fine horses. His office was at 1022 Jefferson Avenue in Detroit and his permanent residence was at 134 Lafayette Boulevard. Barbour died on March 28, 1934, at the age of 90 at his summer residence at 9 Berkshire Place in Grosse Pointe Farms, Michigan, near Detroit. He died of pneumonia which he contracted a week before his death.
