= Anna de Koven =

American novelist

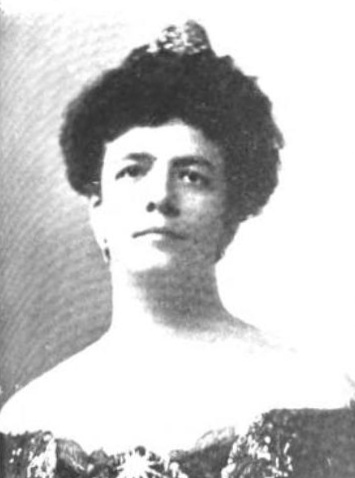
- Born: Anna Farwell; November 19, 1862; Chicago, Illinois
- Died: January 12, 1953 (aged 90); Northeast Harbor, Maine
- Education: Lake Forest University
- Occupation: Writer
- Spouse: Reginald de Koven (m. 1884; died 1920)
- Children: 1
- Parents: Charles B. Farwell (father); Mary Evelyn Farwell (mother)
- Relatives: Rose Farwell Chatfield-Taylor (sister)

Anna de Koven (née Farwell; November 19, 1862 – January 12, 1953) was an American novelist, historian and socialite. The wife of composer Reginald de Koven, she published her works as Mrs. Reginald de Koven.

== Career ==
Anna Farwell was born in Chicago, Illinois on November 19, 1860, the daughter of senator Charles B. Farwell and Mary Evelyn Farwell (née Smith). She was the valedictorian of her class at Lake Forest University.

She married composer Reginald de Koven on May 1, 1884, and they had one child. A well-known society hostess, she and her husband gave many musical receptions while living in their home in Irving Place in New York. An amateur athlete, she wrote in Good Housekeeping that "no sport is too reckless, too daring, or too strenuous for the more experienced among athletic American women."

Her novels included 1895's a Sawdust Doll, published by Stone and Kimball as part of "the Peacock Library." Her non-fictional works included a two-volume biography of John Paul Jones, published in 1913, and a study of spiritualism, A Cloud of Witnesses (1920), based on her efforts to contact her late sister, Rose Farwell Chatfield-Taylor (1870–1918).

Anna de Koven died in Northeast Harbor, Maine on January 12, 1953.

== Bibliography ==
- By the Waters of Babylon (1890)
- A Sawdust Doll (1895)
- Life and Letters of John Paul Jones (1913)
- The Counts of Gruyère (1916)
- A Cloud of Witnesses (1920)
- A Primer of Citizenship (1923)
- A Musician and His Wife (1926)
- Horace Walpole and Madame du Deffand: an Eighteenth Century Friendship (1929)
- Women in Cycles of Culture (1941)
