= Manchester Boddy =

American newspaper publisher (1891–1967)

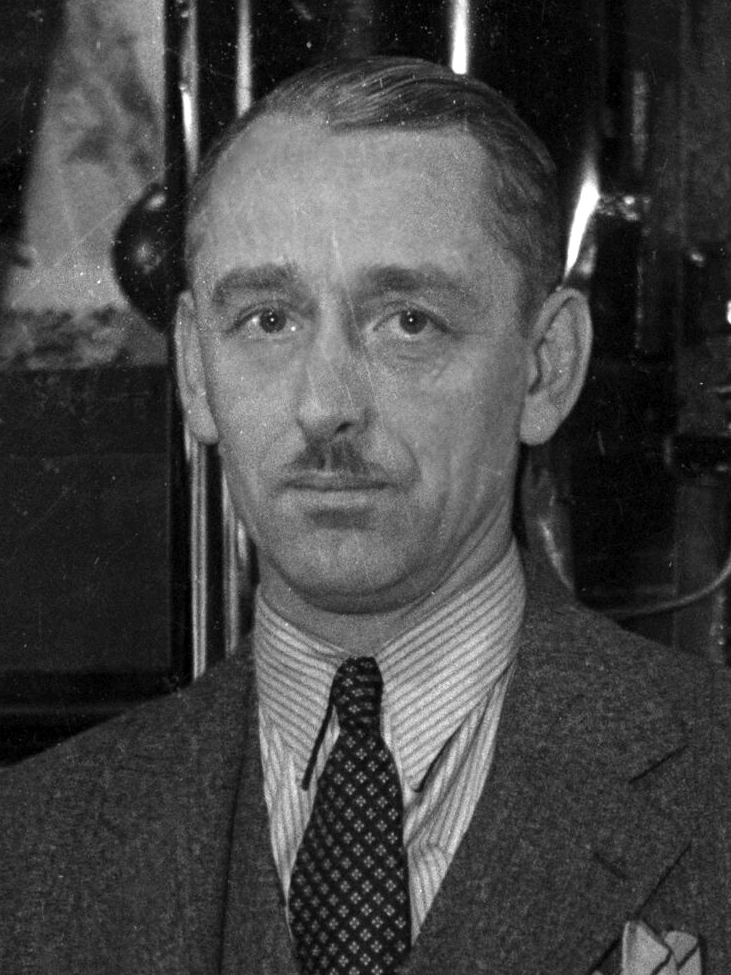
- Boddy in 1936
- Born: Elias Manchester Boddy; November 1, 1891; Lake Tapps, Washington, U.S.
- Died: May 12, 1967 (aged 75); Pasadena, California
- Occupation: Newspaper publisher

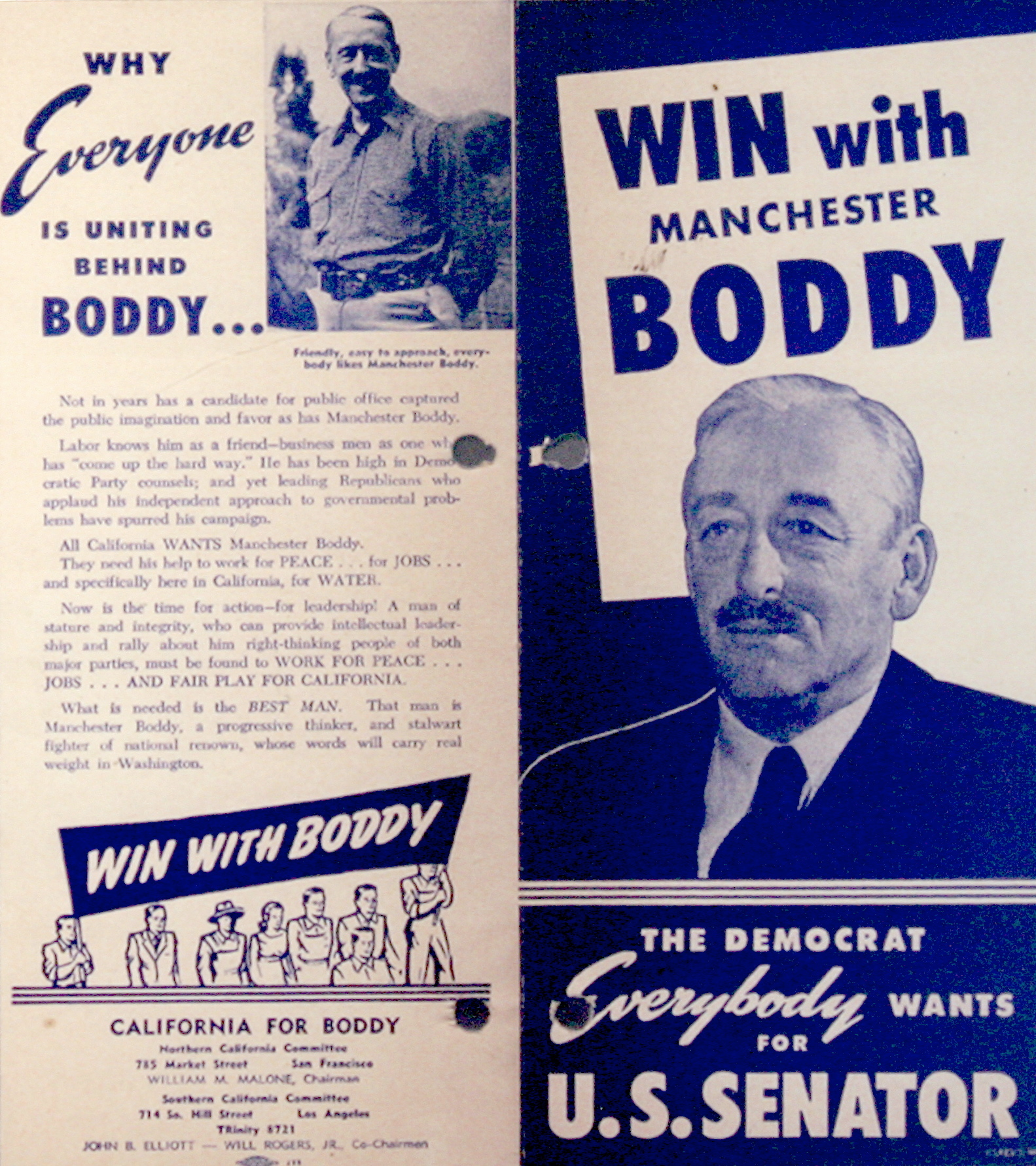
Campaign flyer for Manchester Boddy for Senate campaign

Elias Manchester Boddy (/ˈboʊdiː/; November 1, 1891– May 12, 1967) was an American newspaper publisher. He rose from poverty to become the publisher of a major California newspaper and a candidate for Congress. His estate, Descanso Gardens, was deeded to the County of Los Angeles in 1953 as a floral park.

== Life and career ==
=== Early life and education ===
Boddy was born November 1, 1891, in a log cabin on a Lake Tapps, Washington, homestead. He was said to have walked five miles daily to and from school and later attended Washington State College and the University of Montana.

Boddy's career was called, by Art Berman of the Los Angeles Times, a "classic example of the self-made man, with his early years marked by poverty." Boddy's university years were interspersed with periods of working as a "door-to-door flatiron salesman, ditch digger, janitor and miner." He was also a milker, recruiter for the University of Montana, and New York City subway guard, then an Encyclopædia Britannica salesman in that city, where he persuaded poor families to band together to buy the volumes. In Massachusetts, he evaded a ban on book salesmen at Harvard University by hiring students as his agents. He was then promoted to sales manager for the encyclopedia.

=== World War I ===
In World War I, Boddy was a second lieutenant in the infantry. He was gassed in the Argonne and sent home disabled. He spent months in a hospital. He was said to have resembled the actor Adolphe Menjou, and Time said much later that he was "High-voiced, quick-moving, affable, ... an efficient horseman, pistol shot and fisherman."

=== Sales ===
After the war, he resumed his old sales vocation by selling back issues of the magazine Current History as bound volumes titled The European War. He moved west for his health, founded a book publishing company in Los Angeles and sold copies of the Mexican Year Book and other titles for Los Angeles Times publisher Harry Chandler. For fifty dollars, he purchased an unsuccessful publication called Smiles and persuaded the Commercial Board of Los Angeles to take the magazine as its house organ, thereby establishing himself as a publisher.

=== Newspaper ===
In 1926, Boddy was hired as editor of the Los Angeles Illustrated Daily News, a failing newspaper originally founded by Cornelius Vanderbilt, Jr. The following year, with the newspaper bankrupt, he persuaded a stockholder committee and then a federal judge to allow him to take over the newspaper. Within years, it became immensely profitable with Boddy as editor and publisher.

Boddy assumed ownership of the newspaper on August 5, 1926. Its plant, at Pico Boulevard and Los Angeles Street, was deeply in debt. He rejected Vanderbilt's editorial philosophy of emphasizing good news by turning the Daily News into a crusading newspaper that addressed police corruption, gambling and prostitution. He quickly earned the enmity of Los Angeles Police Chief James E. Davis, who attempted to silence the News by arresting Boddy. Davis used an obscure municipal law that made it illegal to publish horse-racing entries and results in a general circulation newspaper. The charges never got beyond the arraignment stage, and Boddy continued reporting on vice and corruption in his paper.

Boddy was a Republican and supported Herbert Hoover in the 1932 presidential election. He believed the election of Franklin D. Roosevelt was a "terrible mistake." Still, he recognized that Roosevelt's New Deal policies had merit and could lift the country out of the Great Depression. The Daily News was the only Los Angeles newspaper to openly endorse Roosevelt and give him balanced coverage. It also devoted considerable coverage to technocracy, a type of scientific management of society and the economy. Boddy gave news space to Robert Noble's "Ham 'N Eggs" plan and Dr. Francis Townsend's "Townsend Plan," which proposed that state and federal governments give money to people over age 60. The Daily News also extensively covered Upton Sinclair's run for California governor and his controversial End Poverty in California (EPIC) campaign. Competing newspapers either ignored the campaign or wrote vehement editorials against Sinclair's programs.

Just before World War II in October 1941, a disastrous explosion and fire in Fall River, Massachusetts, destroyed a large plant of the Firestone Tire & Rubber Company and with it a large part of government's supply of raw rubber, necessitating scrap drives to collect rubber. Boddy was on the air every night for more than four months, appealing to the public to collect and turn in their old automobile tires and other scrap. In a memo to President Roosevelt, Boddy outlined a plan to get rubber out of Japanese-held Malaya. Three weeks after he had written the memo, Boddy received a letter from the President thanking him for the idea and telling him that the operation was under way. Whether or not the operation actually took place, the story became the basis of the 1950 Hollywood film Malaya, in which the character "John Manchester," portrayed by Lionel Barrymore, was based on Boddy.

Boddy's editorial policies in these early years established the Daily News as the city's only liberal journalistic voice.

After the end of World War II, Boddy's interest in the newspaper began to wane. His efforts to stimulate interest in various plans to boost the country's economy and his crusades for noble causes had ended with the war. Los Angeles had become a mecca for job seekers and a refuge for new arrivals from the frozen East Coast. Postwar Los Angeles was emerging as an increasingly cosmopolitan city, and many of Boddy's editorial policies seemed quaint to the city's new residents.

Boddy spent less and less time at the newspaper as he focused his energies on his estate, Descanso Gardens, in unincorporated Flintridge, now La Cañada Flintridge, California, a suburb of Los Angeles. He eventually turned the day-to-day operations over to his general manager, Robert L. Smith. Without Boddy, the newspaper lost its spunk and no longer tilted at windmills, reported newspaper researcher and writer Rob L. Wagner. By the fall of 1953, the Daily News was losing $75,000 a month, and it folded in December 1954. The assets were purchased by the Times Mirror Company. The Los Angeles Mirror, a Times-owned afternoon tabloid newspaper, took the Daily News name to become the Mirror-News.

=== Death and legacy ===
Boddy died in Pasadena, California, of congestive heart failure at the age of 75 on May 12, 1967. He was survived by his wife, the former Berenice M. Klotz, and two sons, Calvin and Robert. In 2024, Boddy was posthumously inducted into the California Newspaper Hall of Fame.

== Interests ==
=== Horticulture ===
In 1936, Boddy purchased a 150-acre (0.61 km^{2}) parcel in La Cañada, north of Los Angeles. Boddy had a wide range of interests, including horticulture, ranching, plant science, and politics. In 1942, he bought Mission Nursery of San Gabriel—and its stock—from the Yoshimura family, who were interned. Boddy named his estate in La Cañada as Rancho de Descanso, which translates as "Ranch of Restfulness (or Repose)." The estate was deeded to Los Angeles County in 1953 and was opened to the public as the Descanso Gardens.

=== Politics ===
For more, see United States Senate election in California, 1950.

In 1950, U.S. Representative Helen Gahagan Douglas challenged Democratic Senator Sheridan Downey for the Democratic senatorial nomination from California. When Downey bowed out of the campaign, citing ill health, Boddy entered the race. California's Democratic State Central Committee had tried to draft Boddy to run for office in previous elections in 1942 and 1946. Boddy refused, claiming he had no interest in public office. For the 1950 Senate race, Boddy offered no specific reasons why he was running for office other than to say it was a "challenge" and he would meet interesting people.

Boddy's campaign got off to a late start and, according to Wagner, was disorganized. He received an important endorsement from Los Angeles Mayor Fletcher Bowron, a Republican, and also got strong support from labor unions. His primary campaign plank was public ownership of hydroelectric plants across the state. He also supported a controversial proposal to limit land ownership in the Central Valley to 160 acres (0.65 km^{2}). His primary weakness was the lack of solid programs to boost California's economy.

Los Angeles Times political reporter Kyle Palmer wrote that "words flow" easily from Boddy, but his late start and lack of political credentials were handicaps to a successful campaign.

In May 1950, just weeks before the primary election, Boddy labeled Douglas the "Pink Lady" by implying that she was aligned with Communists and was part of a group of "red hots" trying to seize control of Democratic county committees in the state. Boddy and Douglas ran a bitter primary campaign, leaving Douglas, the Democratic victor, badly wounded in her race against the winner of the Republican primary, Congressman Richard Nixon. Boddy came up with the idea of comparing Douglas's voting record to that of leftist New York Congressman Vito Marcantonio of the American Labor Party—a tactic that was seized on by Nixon and his campaign manager, Murray Chotiner, in the general election.

On June 6, 1950, Douglas beat Boddy at the polls largely on the strength of her popularity with African-American voters. She garnered 889,000 votes to Boddy's 532,000. Nixon, who had cross-filed in both parties in the primary, won 1,060,000 votes. Douglas lost to Nixon in the November general election.

== See also ==
- Charles E. Downs, jailed City Council member supported by Boddy
- C.H. Garrigues, Daily News political writer
