= Helen Gahagan Douglas =

American actress and politician (1900–1980)

Helen Douglas
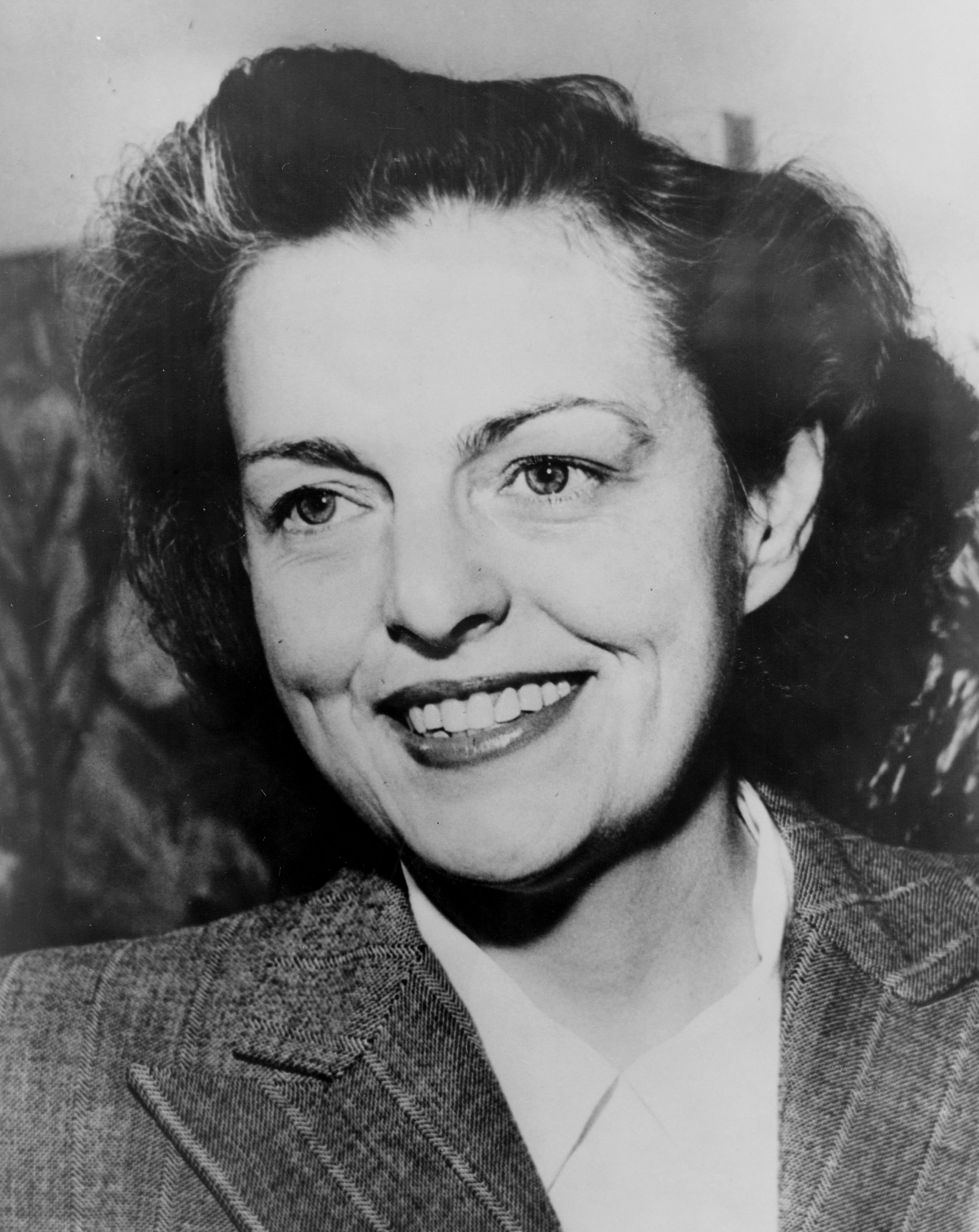
- Gahagan Douglas, c. 1945

Member of the U.S. House of Representatives from California's 14th district
- In office January 3, 1945 – January 3, 1951
- Preceded by: Thomas F. Ford
- Succeeded by: Sam Yorty

Personal details
- Born: Helen Mary Gahagan; November 25, 1900 Boonton, New Jersey, U.S.
- Died: June 28, 1980 (aged 79) New York City, New York, U.S.
- Party: Democratic
- Spouse: Melvyn Douglas (m. 1931)
- Children: 2
- Parent: Walter H. Gahagan (father)
- Education: Columbia University (attended)

Helen Gahagan Douglas (born Helen Mary Gahagan; November 25, 1900 – June 28, 1980) was an American actress and politician.

Gahagan Douglas's acting career included success on Broadway, as a touring opera singer, and in Hollywood films. Her portrayal of the villain in She (1935) inspired the Evil Queen in Snow White and the Seven Dwarfs (1937).

In 1944, Gahagan Douglas was first elected to the United States Congress. In the 1950 U.S. Senate election in California, she lost to Republican nominee and future president, Richard Nixon. The campaign became symbolic of modern political vitriol, as both Gahagan Douglas's Democratic primary opponent Manchester Boddy and Nixon referred to her as "pink right down to her underwear", suggesting Communist sympathies.

== Early life ==
Helen Mary Gahagan was born in Boonton, New Jersey, of Scotch-Irish descent. She was the eldest daughter of Lillian Rose (Mussen) and Walter H. Gahagan, an engineer who owned a construction business in Brooklyn and a shipyard in Arverne, Queens; her mother had been a schoolteacher. She was reared Episcopalian. Gahagan was raised at 231 Lincoln Place in the Park Slope area of Brooklyn, an upper-middle-class neighborhood. She attended the prestigious Berkeley Carroll School, where she "attracted the favorable attention of Brooklyn critics through her performance in school plays". Following an argument with her father, who did not believe becoming an actress was a suitable occupation for a woman, she was sent to study at the Capen School for Girls in Northampton, Massachusetts.

Gahagan gained admittance to Barnard College of Columbia University, class of 1924. To the dismay and shock of her father she left after two years, without finishing her degree, to pursue an acting career.

== Acting career ==
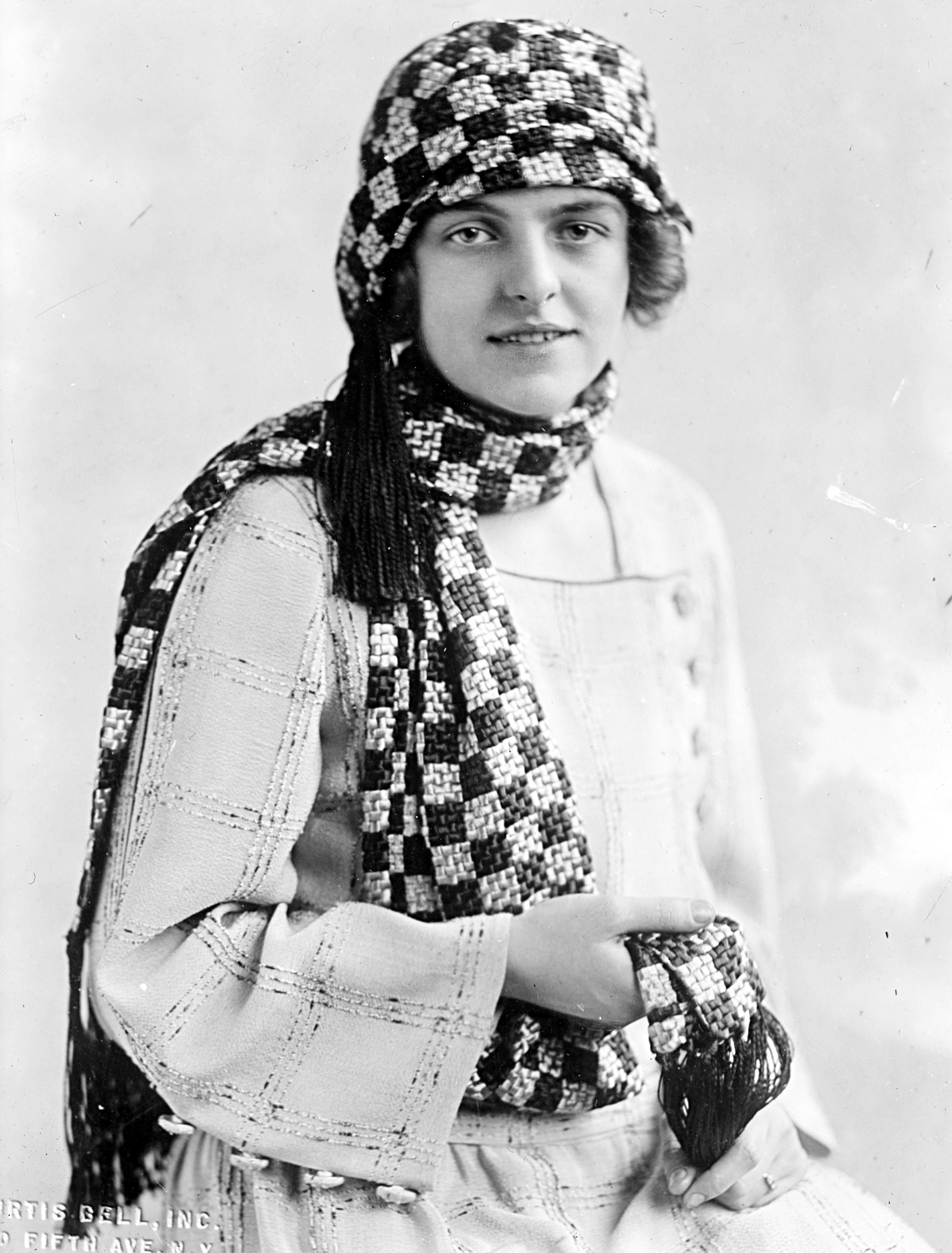
Helen Gahagan, c. 1920s

Gahagan found great success and became a well known star on Broadway in the 1920s, appearing in popular plays such as Young Woodley and Trelawney of the Wells.

In 1927, at the age of 26, Gahagan set out to forge a new career as an opera singer, and, after two years of voice lessons, she found herself touring across Europe and receiving critical praise, unusual for an American at the time. In 1930, she returned to Broadway to star in a production of Tonight or Never, where she co-starred with actor Melvyn Douglas. The two married in 1931, Gahagan keeping her maiden name. They had two children, Peter and Mary.

Gahagan Douglas went to Los Angeles in 1935, starring in the Hollywood movie She, playing Hash-a-Motep, queen of a lost city. The movie, based on H. Rider Haggard's novel of the same name, is perhaps best known for popularizing a phrase from the novel, "She who must be obeyed".

While in Vienna in 1938, performing in opera (which was a dream come true for Gahagan Douglas), she found herself having coffee with a Nazi sympathizer. The experience sickened her to such a degree that she immediately flew back to Los Angeles, determined to fight Nazism publicly.

== Political career ==
Introduced to politics by her husband, Gahagan Douglas joined the Democratic Party shortly after the election of Franklin D. Roosevelt in 1932. The Roosevelts and the Douglases would develop a close friendship, with Eleanor Roosevelt serving as a political mentor to Gahagan Douglas.

She largely disliked the atmosphere of Hollywood; following the birth of her daughter, Mary Helen, in 1938, Gahagan Douglas took to learning about the plight of migrant workers and grew increasingly politically aware. She soon became the director of the John Steinbeck Committee, named for the author of The Grapes of Wrath, and by 1940 she was the national spokesperson for migrants.

=== Appointments and activities ===
The Douglases joined the Hollywood Anti-Nazi League; in 1939, they joined others in calling for a United States boycott against goods produced in Nazi Germany.

Gahagan Douglas was a member of the national advisory committee of the Works Progress Administration and of the State committee of the National Youth Administration in 1939 and 1940. She then served as Democratic national committeewoman for California and vice chairwoman of the Democratic state central committee and chairman of the women's division from 1940 to 1944. She was also a member of the board of governors of the California Housing and Planning Association in 1942 and 1943, and was appointed by Roosevelt as a member of the Voluntary Participation Committee, Office of Civilian Defense. She was later appointed by President Harry S. Truman as an alternate United States delegate to the United Nations Assembly.

In 1946, she was among those honored by the National Association of Colored Women for her role in interracial cooperation for advancing race and gender equality. Gahagan Douglas had been a colleague of the organization's founder, Mary McLeod Bethune, on the National Youth Administration.

=== House of Representatives ===
In 1943, Democratic leaders, including FDR, persuaded Gahagan Douglas to run in the 1944 election for the 14th Congressional District seat opened by the retirement of Congressman Thomas F. Ford. To try to appeal to conservative voters, she started using her husband's last name. As the California Democratic committee chairwoman, she spoke at the 1944 Democratic National Convention in Chicago. Her impressive speech raised her profile, with some imagining a VP spot in her future, if not a presidential candidacy. In the fall elections, Gahagan Douglas won the House race and subsequently ran for — and won — two more terms, serving in the 79th, 80th and 81st Congresses (January 1945 – January 1951).

During her three terms in the House, she championed various issues, such as civil rights, migrant worker welfare, women's issues, affordable housing, progressive taxation, and nuclear disarmament; she sponsored an anti-lynching bill against Southern opposition. She also championed a controversial bill to create a Franklin Delano Roosevelt National Forest that would protect California redwoods from Sonoma County to Oregon. The forest bill was opposed locally by business interests fearing the loss of taxable properties.

Her love affair with Lyndon B. Johnson was an open secret on Capitol Hill.

Helen Gahagan Douglas concedes defeat, 1950

=== 1950 U.S. Senate campaign ===
In 1950, Gahagan Douglas ran for the United States Senate, although incumbent Democrat Sheridan Downey was seeking a third term. California Democratic state chairman William M. Malone had advised Gahagan Douglas to wait until 1952 to run for the Senate, rather than split the party in a fight with Downey. Gahagan Douglas, however, told Malone that Downey had neglected veterans and small growers and had to be unseated. Downey withdrew from the race before the primary and supported a third candidate, Manchester Boddy, the owner and publisher of the Los Angeles Daily News. When Gahagan Douglas defeated Boddy for the nomination, Downey endorsed the Republican nominee, U.S. Representative Richard M. Nixon.

Fellow Representative John F. Kennedy quietly donated money to Nixon's campaign against Gahagan Douglas, Kennedy and Nixon sharing similar views on the threat of communism.

In the primary race, Boddy had referred to Gahagan Douglas as "the Pink Lady" and said that she was "pink right down to her underwear", a suggestion that she sympathized with the Soviet Union. During the general election, Nixon reprised Boddy's line of attack. Nixon's campaign manager, Murray Chotiner, had 500,000 flyers printed on sheets of pink paper. Chotiner explained, "The purpose of an election is not to defeat your opponent, but to destroy him."

In a race that was remembered as one of the most vicious in California political history, Nixon's charges were intentionally directed towards the assassination of Gahagan Douglas's character. He implied that she was a Communist "fellow traveler" by comparing her votes to those of Representative Vito Marcantonio of New York (a pro-Soviet member of the American Labor Party), and deployed anti-Semitic surrogates to call on voters to reject her because her husband, Melvyn, was Jewish. Gahagan Douglas, in return, popularized a nickname for Nixon (apparently coined by Manchester Boddy) which became one of the most enduring nicknames in American politics: "Tricky Dick".

Nixon won the election by a vote of 2,183,454 (59%) to 1,502,507 (41%), and Gahagan Douglas's political career came to an end, but she remained an activist, continuing to advocate for the regulation of nuclear weapons for several decades. In the 1950 election, conservative Democrat Samuel W. Yorty (later a Republican convert) succeeded her in Congress.

Gahagan Douglas would later say that Nixon's harsh campaign tactics were "completely unnecessary" and that she likely would've lost the election anyway. Young, Republican-inclined voters in the state could feel a closer personal connection to Nixon, a thirty-something man with a young family much like themselves. They perceived Gahagan Douglas as too liberal and stuck in the New Deal era. Further, money from oil companies was pouring into the state to tilt the balance in favor of Nixon.

== Later life ==
It was rumored that Gahagan Douglas would have been given a political appointment in the Truman administration, but that the Nixon–Douglas race had made such an appointment too controversial for Truman. Democratic National Committee vice-chair India Edwards, a Gahagan Douglas supporter, remarked that Gahagan Douglas could not have been appointed dogcatcher.

She returned to acting in 1952, and later campaigned for John F. Kennedy, who ran successfully against Nixon in the 1960 presidential race.

Gahagan Douglas was mentioned in the 1965 song "George Murphy" by satirist Tom Lehrer. The song begins, "Hollywood's often tried to mix / show business with politics / from Helen Gahagan / to Ronald Reagan ..."

Kennedy's successor Lyndon Johnson appointed Gahagan Douglas as "Special Ambassador" to the inauguration of Liberian President William Tubman. However, Gahagan Douglas's subsequent opposition to the Vietnam War angered Johnson, estranging him from her. She also campaigned for George McGovern in his unsuccessful bid to prevent Nixon's 1972 re-election, and she called for Nixon's removal from office during the Watergate scandal.

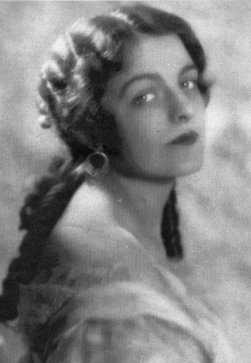
Helen Gahagan

During and after the Watergate scandal, bumper stickers featuring the legend "Don't blame me, I voted for Helen Gahagan Douglas" cropped up on cars in California. In October 1973, Gahagan Douglas was among the first women featured on the cover of Ms. magazine. At its 1979 commencement ceremonies, Barnard College awarded Gahagan Douglas its highest honor, the Barnard Medal of Distinction. She died the following year from breast and lung cancer, with her husband Melvyn by her side.

== Legacy ==
Senator Alan Cranston of California eulogized her on the floor of the Senate on August 5, 1980, saying, "I believe Helen Gahagan Douglas was one of the grandest, most eloquent, deepest-thinking people we have had in American politics. She stands among the best of our 20th-century leaders, rivaling even Eleanor Roosevelt in stature, compassion and simple greatness."

A collection of Helen Gahagan Douglas's papers spanning her life and career are held by the Carl Albert Center.

== Electoral history ==
1944 United States House of Representatives elections
| Party | Candidate | Votes | % |
|---|---|---|---|
| Democratic | Helen Gahagan Douglas | 65,729 | 51.6 |
| Republican | William D. Campbell | 61,767 | 48.4 |
| Total votes | | 127,496 | 100.0 |
| Turnout | | | |
| Democratic hold | | | |

1946 United States House of Representatives elections
| Party | Candidate | Votes | % |
|---|---|---|---|
| Democratic | Helen Gahagan Douglas (Incumbent) | 53,536 | 54.4 |
| Republican | Frederick M. Roberts | 44,914 | 45.6 |
| Total votes | | 98,450 | 100.0 |
| Turnout | | | |
| Democratic hold | | | |

1948 United States House of Representatives elections
| Party | Candidate | Votes | % |
|---|---|---|---|
| Democratic | Helen Gahagan Douglas (Incumbent) | 89,581 | 65.3 |
| Republican | W. Wallace Braden | 44,611 | 32.5 |
| Progressive | Sidney Moore | 2,904 | 2.2 |
| Total votes | | 137,096 | 100.0 |
| Turnout | | | |
| Democratic hold | | | |

United States Senate election in California, 1950
| Party | Candidate | Votes | % |
|---|---|---|---|
| Republican | Richard Nixon | 2,183,454 | 59.23 |
| Democratic | Helen Gahagan Douglas | 1,502,507 | 40.76 |
| Write-ins | | 334 | 0.01 |
| Total votes | | 3,686,315 | 100.00 |
| Turnout | | | 73.32 |
| Republican gain from Democratic | | | |

== See also ==
- Women in the United States House of Representatives

U.S. House of Representatives
| Preceded by Thomas Ford | Member of the U.S. House of Representatives from California's 14th congressional district 1945–1951 | Succeeded by Sam Yorty |
Party political offices
| Preceded by Sheridan Downey | Democratic nominee for U.S. Senator from California (Class 3); 1950 | Succeeded by Sam Yorty |
