= Malaya (film) =

1949 film by Richard Thorpe

- Theatrical release poster
- Directed by: Richard Thorpe
- Screenplay by: Frank Fenton
- Story by: Manchester Boddy
- Produced by: Edwin H. Knopf
- Starring: Spencer Tracy; James Stewart; Valentina Cortese; Sydney Greenstreet; John Hodiak; Lionel Barrymore
- Cinematography: George J. Folsey
- Edited by: Ben Lewis
- Music by: Bronislau Kaper
- Production company: Metro-Goldwyn-Mayer
- Distributed by: Loew's Inc.
- Release dates: December 28, 1949 (Greensborough, North Carolina); January 6, 1950 (US)
- Running time: 94-95 minutes
- Country: United States
- Language: English
- Box office: $3,087,000

Malaya is a 1949 American war thriller film produced by MGM and set in colonial Malaya during World War II. Starring Spencer Tracy, James Stewart and Valentina Cortese, it was directed by Richard Thorpe. The supporting cast features Sydney Greenstreet, John Hodiak, and Lionel Barrymore, with Richard Loo and Gilbert Roland appearing in notable roles.

== Plot ==
In January 1942, one month after the United States entered World War II, reporter John Royer returns to the United States. He goes to see his friend, newspaper publisher John Manchester, about a scheme to smuggle desperately needed rubber out of Japanese-occupied Malaya.

Manchester, selected by the government to deal with the rubber shortage, is immediately interested. Government agent Kellar spearheads an investigation of Royer, and takes him to a meeting with Manchester and others. Royer explains it will require gold, he will need the help of his currently incarcerated friend and inveterate smuggler Carnahan, and will be a risky enough adventure it may cost him his own life. He is granted approval to put his plan straight into action.

Carnaghan is released from Federal custody at Alcatraz — where Royer's exposé on Southeast Asian smuggling had landed him. They slip into Malaya and contact Carnaghan's associate, gin mill and casino operator the Dutchman, who recruits a gang of mercenaries and cutthroats. Carnaghan also renews his romance with the saloon's Italian singer, Luana.

Using gold and intimidation, they succeed in purchasing all the available rubber, and get two-thirds of it out. The Japanese commander, Colonel Tomura, is alerted to the remaining shipment by double crossing plantation owner, German Bruno Gerber.

Before commencing the trip to a waiting freighter, Carnaghan smells an ambush. He forces Gerber to confess. Royer decides to try going around the ambush on his own. Carnaghan and the Dutchman hear machine guns riddling the boats. Royer, driven by the death of his only sibling, a younger brother at Wake Island, goes down fighting.

Tomura hints to the Dutchman that he would be willing to look the other way and let the remaining rubber go for a price. The Dutchman is certain it is a gambit, and Tomura cannot be bought, but Carnaghan figures he will outwit him.

Luana is determined to stick with Carnahan wherever he goes, and gets into his boat, bound for rendezvous with an American freighter. Knowing he may well be killed before he gets there, he shoves her off. Overtaken en route by a Japanese patrol boat, Carnaghan leads Tomura seaward. A Japanese warship appears. Carnaghan is badly wounded in a shootout, killing Tomura and a pair of Japanese guards. He watches as two U.S. PT boats sink the warship, then collapses below the gunwale.

The war continues, and Malaya is freed. Kellar walks through the Dutchman's bar. Asked by him if he has found Carnahan, Keller replies yes, on an island with Luana.

Offered a medal, Carnaghan sent it back to be pinned on the Dutchman.

== Cast ==
- Spencer Tracy as Carnaghan
- James Stewart as John Royer
- Valentina Cortese as Luana
- Sydney Greenstreet as The Dutchman
- John Hodiak as Kellar
- Lionel Barrymore as John Manchester
- Richard Loo as Colonel Tomura
- Gilbert Roland as Romano
- Roland Winters as Bruno Gerber

== Production ==
The film was based on Manchester Boddy's plan to get rubber out of Japanese-held Malaya after a fire destroyed a large part of the US government's supply of raw rubber at the Firestone Tire & Rubber Company's plant in Fall River, Massachusetts. The character John Manchester, portrayed by Lionel Barrymore, was based on Boddy.

The film was originally developed by Dore Schary for RKO under the title Operation Malaya. Howard Hughes rejected both Operation Malaya and Battleground. When Schary left RKO to go to Metro-Goldwyn-Mayer, he bought the property for MGM. Principal photography took place from mid-February to March 24, 1949. The film's release was delayed due to hesitation about making a film about World War II.

This film was the first occasion on which James Stewart worked with Spencer Tracy since his screen debut in Murder Man (1935) in a minor role with sixth billing.

This was Greenstreet's last picture. He was borrowed from Warner Bros. for the film. Valentina Cortese was borrowed from 20th Century Fox.

== Reception ==
=== Box office ===
According to MGM records, the film earned $1,959,000 in the U.S. and Canada and $1,128,000 in other markets, resulting in a profit of $691,000.

=== Critical response ===
The New York Times critic Bosley Crowther called the film "a rousing, old-fashioned thriller about bold men with wily minds and crushing fists. Scenarist Frank Fenton crowded plenty of action into the script and Richard Thorpe's direction keeps the screen pulsing with excitement".
