= Rob L. Wagner =

American journalist

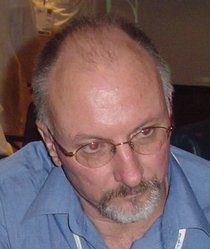
- Born: 1954 (age 71–72)
- Occupation: Journalist
- Subject: Saudi Arabia

Rob L. Wagner (born 1954) is an American documentary filmmaker and journalist covering Middle East issues, particularly political and social topics in Saudi Arabia. His documentaries focus on history. In 2015 he was the Saudi Arabia correspondent for the London-based The Arab Weekly newspaper. He previous served as managing editor of the Arab News, an English-language daily newspaper based in Jeddah, Saudi Arabia, and the Saudi Gazette, a competitor of the Arab News. Wagner was also the top editor of Construction Week magazine in Dubai and is the author of numerous history books.

== Career ==
Wagner, who grew up in Sierra Madre, California, began his journalism career in 1974 at the now-defunct Monrovia Daily News-Post as a copy boy and later worked as sports editor for the Hollywood Daily Independent. During the 1980s and 1990s, he was a police and courts reporter for the Ontario, California Daily Report and San Gabriel Valley Tribune. At the Inland Valley Daily Bulletin (formerly the Daily Report) in Ontario, California, he was managing editor. He also worked as a freelance writing on legal affairs issues for the Los Angeles Daily Journal and true crime stories for True Detective magazine. He is the author of more than 20 books, including Hollywood Bohemia: The Roots of Progressive Politics in Rob Wagner's Script (Janaway Publishing, 2016), Red Ink, White Lies: The Rise and Fall of Los Angeles Newspapers (Dragonflyer Press, 2000), Sleeping Giant: An Illustrated History of California's Inland Empire (Stephens Press, 2003) contributing author for the academic textbook Opposing Viewpoints: Islam, Vol. 2 (Greenhaven Press, Gale Cengage Learning, 2009). and "Witness to a Century: The Inland Valley (Dragonflyer Press, 1999).

Wagner is married to Saudi journalist and educator Dr. Sabria Jawhar.

=== Filmmaking ===
In 2023, Wagner directed "Searching for Halifax NP711", a documentary film about a Royal Canadian Air Force crew shot down and killed during a bombing raid over Germany in 1945. The film has garnered first place honors for Best Documentary at the Fern Film Awards, the Critic's Choice Award for Best Documentary at the World Film Carnival in Singapore, Best Documentary at the Eastern Europe Film Festival and Best Debut Director at the Brandenburg International Film Festival in Germany. He also directed a film on Glasgow's Necropolis cemetery. He is engaged as executive producer of a film report on the generational progress of Saudi women in the workplace.

=== Saudi Gazette and Arab News ===
In 2004, Wagner resigned as an editor at The Record (Stockton, California) to become the national editor of the Saudi Gazette, an English-language daily newspaper based in Jeddah, Saudi Arabia. He later became the newspaper's managing editor. As managing editor, he supervised the coverage of Al-Qaeda in the Arabian Peninsula’s bombing and shooting attacks of Westerners and Saudi government institutions, and Saudi Arabia's 2005 municipal elections among other issues. He also taught journalism courses to Saudi university students. In 2008, he assumed the editorship of the Dubai-based Construction Week magazine to cover the building boom in the United Arab Emirates. In 2012, he returned to Saudi Arabia to assume the post of managing editor at the Arab News.

=== Reporting ===
As a journalist, Wagner primarily writes about Saudi and Islamic issues. He provides analysis on Saudi women's issues for Peace and Conflict Review, which is published by the University for Peace of Costa Rica. Most recently, he reports for The Arab Weekly, a newspaper based in London that provides political and cultural analysis of the Middle East and North Africa regions. His articles for the Media Line, a Middle East news website, has been syndicated to the Yemen Times, Kuwait Times, Daily News Egypt, Gulf News and the Arab News. He is also a correspondent on Shariah-compliant/Islamic tourism for Thomson Reuters wire service, contributor for Lonely Planet and contributing columnist for the International Business Times in London.
