= India Edwards =

American politician

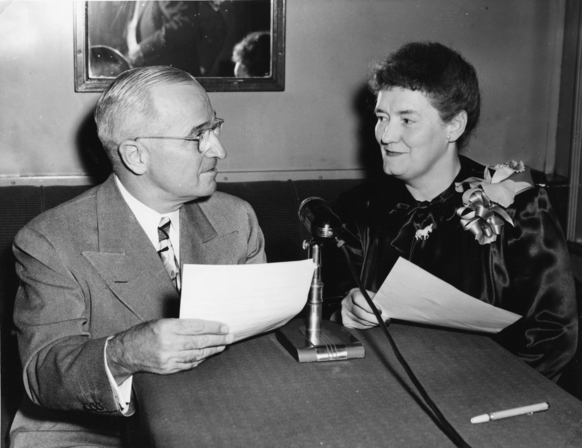
- Edwards with President Harry S. Truman (left) in 1948

Vice Chair of the Democratic National Committee
- In office 1950–1956

Personal details
- Born: June 16, 1895 Chicago, Illinois, U.S.
- Died: January 14, 1990 (aged 94) Sebastopol, California, U.S.
- Party: Democratic
- Spouses: Daniel Sharp (m. 1917; died 1918) Jack Moffet (m. 1920; div. 1937) Herbert T. Edwards (m. 1942)
- Children: 2

India Edwards (June 16, 1895 – January 14, 1990) was an American journalist and political advisor who served as the vice chair of the Democratic National Committee. She was an advocate for women in politics. Her memoirs, Pulling No Punches, were published by G. P. Putnam's Sons in 1977.

== Early life and education ==
Edwards was born in Chicago, Illinois in 1895, to John A. and India H. (Thomas) Gillespie and grew up in Nashville, Tennessee.

== Career ==
Edwards started her career as a Chicago Tribune journalist and was society editor from 1918 to 1936 and women's page editor from 1936 to 1942. She left the Tribune and moved to Washington, D.C.

=== Democratic Party ===
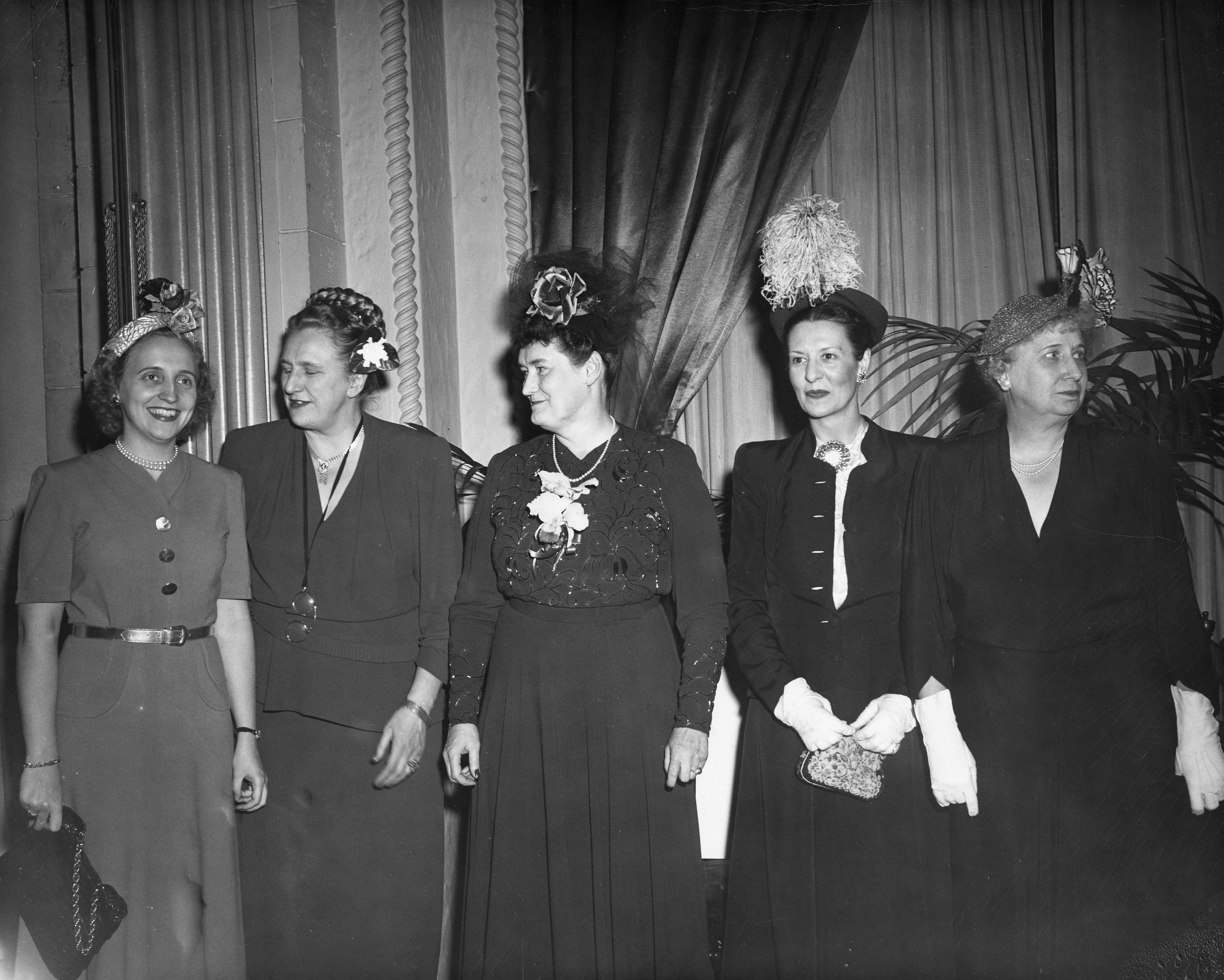
A party in Edwards' honor with, from left to right, Margaret Truman, Esther Tufty, India Edwards, Eda Brannan, and First Lady Bess Truman.

Edwards' formal involvement with the Democratic Party began with her work as a volunteer during the 1944 Presidential election. She later occupied increasingly important position in the women's division of the party, serving first as executive secretary (1945–1947), associate director (1947–1948) and finally executive director (1948–1953). In 1953, the women's division was integrated into the DNC; she was succeeded by Katie Louchheim. In 1950, Edwards was unanimously elected to the Democratic National Committee (DNC) and occupied the vice-chair position from 1950 to 1956. Still, Edwards remained active in the Democratic Party politics for over thirty years throughout the careers of such politicians as Harry S. Truman, John F. Kennedy and Lyndon B. Johnson.

=== Truman campaigns and administration ===
Edwards accompanied President Harry Truman, whom she deeply admired and was called her "political hero," on his 1948 campaign tour; she was confident he would win, and Truman confided in her that he sometimes thought he and she were the only ones who believed he would win.

Her influence over Truman caused him to appoint many women to prominent positions, including Eugenia Anderson as United States Ambassador to Denmark, Perle Mesta as United States Minister to Luxembourg, Ruth Bryan Rohde as an alternate delegate to the United Nations, Eleanor Roosevelt as the head of the U.S. delegation to the U.N. General Assembly, and Georgia Neese Clark as Treasurer of the United States. At the 1952 Democratic National Convention, her name was included, as a symbolic gesture, in the nominations for vice president. She was the second woman honored in this way at a major party convention (Lena Springs being the first). She declined the nomination because she did not feel the time was right.

Edwards explained how she increased the number of women in federal positions by saying, "Sometimes I felt like a ghoul. I'd read the obits, and as soon as a man had died, I'd rush over to the White House and suggest a woman to replace him."

== Personal life ==
She married for the first time in 1917 to Daniel Sharp, who died a year later in World War I. In 1920, she married investment banker Jack Moffet and had two children (John Holbrook Moffett, who died during World War II, and India Moffett Williams). Edwards and Moffet divorced in 1937. In 1942, she married her third husband, Herbert T. Edwards, who was employed by the State Department.

She died at the age of 94 in Sebastopol, California.
