= Wright Commission =

The Commission on Government Security, commonly known as the Wright Commission, was a bipartisan group established by a statute of the United States government in 1955 to investigate government policies with respect to secrecy. It was named for its chairman Loyd Wright, a former president of the American Bar Association, whom the Commission's 12 members elected to that position.

== History ==
President Dwight D Eisenhower and the two houses of Congress each named four members. Those appointed by Vice President Richard Nixon on behalf of the Senate were Senators John C. Stennis and Norris Cotton, Loyd Wright, and Susan B. Riley, a Tennessee professor of education and the only woman. The Speaker of the House named Representatives William M. McCulloch and Francis E. Walter, James L. Noel Jr., a Texas attorney, and Edwin L. Mechem, former Governor of New Mexico. President Eisenhower named former Attorney General James P. McGranery, Franklin D. Murphy, chancellor of the University of Kansas, Assistant Secretary of Defense Carter L. Burgess, and Under Secretary of Commerce Louis S. Rothschild.

Senators Stennis and Hubert Humphrey authored the resolution that established the Commission. Representative Walter sponsored it in the House of Representatives.

The Commission called its report "the first complete and detailed study" of the government's restrictions on access to information and the prosecution of those found to violate those restrictions.

Its report made a distinction between offenses based in disloyalty and lapses in security:

All loyalty cases are security cases, but the converse is not true. A man who talks too freely when in his cups, or a pervert who is vulnerable to blackmail, may both be security risks although both may be loyal Americans. The Commission recommends that as far as possible such cases be considered on a basis of suitability to safeguard the individual from an unjust stigma of disloyalty.

== Report ==
It noted:

... the dangers to national security that arise out of overclassification of information which retards scientific and technological progress, and thus tend to deprive the country of the lead time that results from the free exchange of ideas and information.

Senator Daniel Moynihan summarized the Commission's report in 1997:

This was not an angry or accusatory group; rather the opposite. It proposed to expand the regime of national security as a regulatory mode. But it did so tentatively, and without conviction; certainly without any sense of urgency. There was even a touch of apprehension: had we already gone far enough or even too far?
