= Louis S. Rothschild =

Under Secretary of Commerce for Transportation
- In office 1955–1958
- President: Dwight D. Eisenhower
- Preceded by: Robert B. Murray Jr.
- Succeeded by: John J. Allen Jr.

United States Maritime Administrator
- In office July 1, 1953 – February 25, 1955
- President: Dwight D. Eisenhower
- Preceded by: Albert W. Gatov
- Succeeded by: Clarence G. Morse

Personal details
- Born: Louis Samuel Rothschild; March 29, 1900 Leavenworth, Kansas
- Died: September 1, 1984 (aged 84) Washington, D.C.
- Party: Republican
- Spouse: Emily Bettman (m. 1929)
- Education: Yale University

Louis Samuel Rothschild (March 29, 1900 – September 1, 1984) was an American investment banker who served as chairman of the Federal Maritime Board and as Under Secretary of Commerce for Transportation under President Dwight D. Eisenhower.

== Early life ==
Rothschild was born in Leavenworth, Kansas on March 29, 1900.

He served in the U.S. Navy from 1918 to 1919, and when upon his return from the war, he earned an Ph.B. from Yale University in 1920.

== Career ==
From 1920 to 1956, Rothschild was an executive with the family business, Rothschild and Sons, Inc., a department store started in 1901 by his father and uncle, in Kansas City, Missouri, and Oklahoma City, serving successively as secretary, vice-president, and president. In 1956, he sold his interest in the department stores and opened a private investment business in Washington.

Rothschild also served as president or director of other corporations and government agencies, including as president and director of the Transportation Equities Corporation, from 1958 to 1961 and 1965; and as director, president and chairman of the Washington, D.C.–based Intermediate Credit Corp. (a subsidiary of Financial General Corporation), from 1962 to 1965, and the Standard R. E. Improvement Co.

=== Public service ===
In 1953, moved to Washington, D.C. and became the U.S. delegate to NATO Planning Board for Ocean Shipping. The impetus for the move to Washington was his service as chairman of the Board of Inland Waterways Corporation, which he held from 1953 to 1959. From 1953 to 1955, he served as chairman of the U.S. Federal Maritime Board under the U.S. Department of Commerce, until he was appointed by fellow Republican President Dwight D. Eisenhower as the Under Secretary of Commerce for Transportation in 1955. While he was Under Secretary, Congress voted to create the Federal Aviation Agency in 1958. He served in that role until 1958 when he was succeeded by John J. Allen Jr.

From 1955 to 1957, he was a member of the Commission on Government Security that was chaired by Loyd Wright, a former president of the American Bar Association. From 1955 to 1958, he was also chairman of the Air Coordinating Committee.

== Personal life ==
In 1929, he was married to Emily Bettman.

Rothschild died of cancer at his home in Washington, D.C. on September 1, 1984.
