= Mendon, Utah =

City in Utah, United States

- City
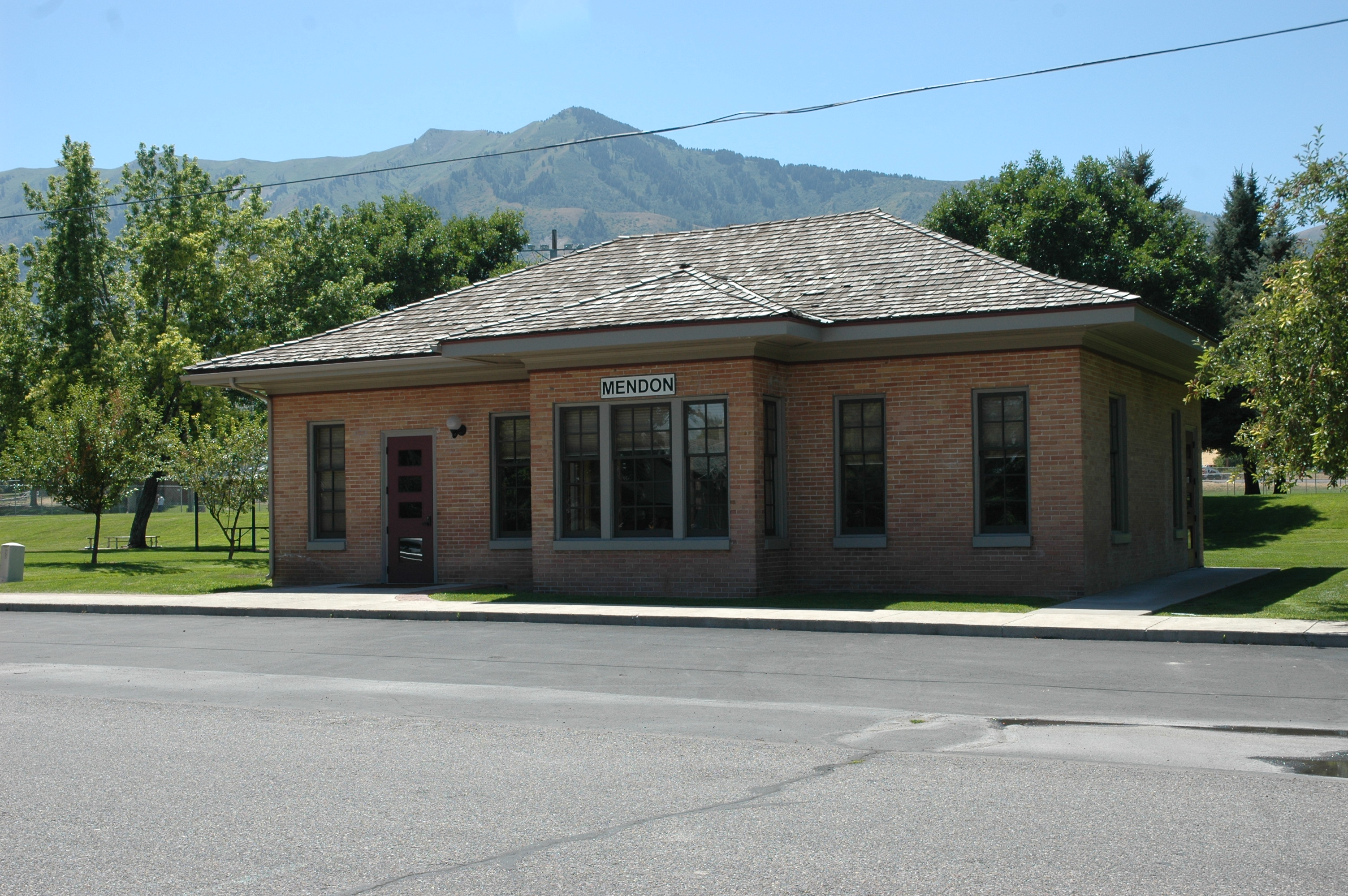
- Mendon Station, a former railroad depot built in 1915, now houses Mendon city offices

- Location in Cache County and the state of Utah.
- Coordinates: 41°42′37″N 111°58′40″W
- Country: United States
- State: Utah
- County: Cache
- Named for: Mendon, Massachusetts

Area
  - Total: 1.43 sq mi (3.71 km^{2})
  - Land: 1.43 sq mi (3.71 km^{2})
  - Water: 0 sq mi (0.00 km^{2})
- Elevation: 4,492 ft (1,369 m)

Population (2020)
  - Total: 1,339
  - Density: 975.4/sq mi (376.62/km^{2})
- Time zone: UTC-7 (Mountain (MST))
  - Summer (DST): UTC-6 (MDT)
- ZIP code: 84325
- Area code: 435
- FIPS code: 49-49160
- GNIS feature ID: 2411077
- Website: mendoncityutah.gov

Mendon (/ˈmɛndən/ MEN-dən) is a city in Cache County, Utah, United States. The population was 1,339 at the 2020 census. It is included in the Logan, Utah-Idaho Metropolitan Statistical Area.

== History ==
Mendon was settled in 1859. James G. Willie, leader of the ill-fated Mormon handcart pioneer company known as the Willie Company, was one of the early settlers of Mendon. He served at times as mayor and postmaster of the town.

The Forster Hotel is one of nine sites in Mendon listed on the National Register of Historic Places.

Mendon made national news in 1974 when the city council ended the century-old tradition of paying the mayor a salary of $15 per year and council members $10 per year, the figure that had been set at the time of Mendon's incorporation in 1870. The mayor's salary was increased to $300 per year— roughly $5.75 per week— and the council members were to be paid $5 for each of the 18 council meetings.

== Geography ==
According to the United States Census Bureau, the city has a total area of 1.2 square miles (3.2 km^{2}), all land.

Mendon is located within the Cache Valley.

== Demographics ==
Historical population
| Census | Pop. | Note | %± |
|---|---|---|---|
| 1870 | 345 | | — |
| 1880 | 543 | | 57.4% |
| 1890 | 547 | | 0.7% |
| 1900 | 494 | | −9.7% |
| 1910 | 459 | | −7.1% |
| 1920 | 404 | | −12.0% |
| 1930 | 395 | | −2.2% |
| 1940 | 454 | | 14.9% |
| 1950 | 369 | | −18.7% |
| 1960 | 345 | | −6.5% |
| 1970 | 345 | | 0.0% |
| 1980 | 663 | | 92.2% |
| 1990 | 684 | | 3.2% |
| 2000 | 898 | | 31.3% |
| 2010 | 1,282 | | 42.8% |
| 2020 | 1,339 | | 4.4% |
U.S. Decennial Census

=== 2020 census ===
As of the 2020 census, Mendon had a population of 1,339. The median age was 34.4 years. 34.1% of residents were under the age of 18 and 13.7% of residents were 65 years of age or older. For every 100 females there were 102.0 males, and for every 100 females age 18 and over there were 99.8 males age 18 and over.

0.0% of residents lived in urban areas, while 100.0% lived in rural areas.

There were 391 households in Mendon, of which 48.8% had children under the age of 18 living in them. Of all households, 75.4% were married-couple households, 9.0% were households with a male householder and no spouse or partner present, and 13.0% were households with a female householder and no spouse or partner present. About 12.5% of all households were made up of individuals and 5.8% had someone living alone who was 65 years of age or older.

There were 407 housing units, of which 3.9% were vacant. The homeowner vacancy rate was 1.1% and the rental vacancy rate was 9.4%.

Racial composition as of the 2020 census
| Race | Number | Percent |
|---|---|---|
| White | 1,262 | 94.2% |
| Black or African American | 3 | 0.2% |
| American Indian and Alaska Native | 10 | 0.7% |
| Asian | 3 | 0.2% |
| Native Hawaiian and Other Pacific Islander | 2 | 0.1% |
| Some other race | 24 | 1.8% |
| Two or more races | 35 | 2.6% |
| Hispanic or Latino (of any race) | 51 | 3.8% |

=== 2000 census ===
As of the 2000 census there were 898 people, 267 households, and 233 families residing in the city. The population density was 717.2 inhabitants per square mile (276.9/km^{2}). There were 283 housing units at an average density of 226.0 per square mile (87.3/km^{2}). The racial makeup of the city was 96.77% White, 1.22% Native American, 1.11% from other races, and 0.89% from two or more races. Hispanic or Latino of any race were 2.00% of the population.

There were 267 households, out of which 50.2% had children under the age of 18 living with them, 80.1% were married couples living together, 4.9% had a female householder with no husband present, and 12.4% were non-families. 11.6% of all households were made up of individuals, and 3.0% had someone living alone who was 65 years of age or older. The average household size was 3.36 and the average family size was 3.65.

In the city, the population was spread out, with 35.9% under the age of 18, 11.9% from 18 to 24, 23.7% from 25 to 44, 21.3% from 45 to 64, and 7.2% who were 65 years of age or older. The median age was 26 years. For every 100 females, there were 102.3 males. For every 100 females age 18 and over, there were 100.0 males.

The median income for a household in the city was $46,563, and the median income for a family was $51,528. Males had a median income of $39,375 versus $20,795 for females. The per capita income for the city was $15,906. About 2.4% of families and 3.8% of the population were below the poverty line, including 3.1% of those under age 18 and 9.8% of those age 65 or over.

== Education ==
Mountainside Elementary part of the Cache County School District.

== Notable people ==
- Ivan J. Barrett, author, professor, and historian of the Church of Jesus Christ of Latter-day Saints.
- Harvey Hancock, aviation executive, journalist, and Republican political organizer.
- Michael J. Murphy, master builder in Carmel-by-the-Sea, California
- Stephen L Richards, leader in The Church of Jesus Christ of Latter-day Saints

== See also ==
- List of cities and towns in Utah
