= Philip A. Ray =

American lawyer and author

U.S. Under Secretary of Commerce
- In office 1959–1961
- President: Dwight D. Eisenhower
- Preceded by: W. Walter Williams
- Succeeded by: Edward Gudeman

Personal details
- Born: Philip Alexander Ray; May 27, 1911 Salt Lake City, Utah, U.S.
- Died: July 15, 1970 (aged 59) San Francisco, California, U.S.
- Party: Republican
- Relations: Joseph Lafayette Rawlins (grandfather)
- Parent(s): William Wallace Ray; Leda Rawlins Ray
- Education: Stanford University

Philip Alexander Ray (May 27, 1911 – July 15, 1970) was an American lawyer and author who served as the Under Secretary of Commerce under President Eisenhower.

== Early life ==
Ray was born, and raised, in Salt Lake City on May 27, 1911, where his father practiced law. He was a son of William Wallace Ray (1880–1957) and Leda (née Rawlins) Ray (1880–1957), and had two brothers, Joseph and William Ray, and a sister, Julia Hills Richland. His maternal grandfather was Joseph Lafayette Rawlins, a United States senator from Utah who had previously served as a delegate to the U.S. House of Representatives from Utah Territory's at-large congressional district.

He was educated at Stanford University and served in U.S. Navy Intelligence during World War II.

== Career ==
From 1954 to 1956, Ray served as general counsel of the Department of Commerce, before he was appointed Under Secretary under Sinclair Weeks in 1959. He served until President John F. Kennedy took office in January 1961 and he was succeeded by Edward Gudeman. After serving in government, Ray relocated to San Francisco where he practiced corporate law as a partner in Kelso, Cotton, Seligan and Ray with Louis O. Kelso.

Ray was also deeply interested in Latin American affairs, and gave lectures on the subject and wrote a book, entitled South Wind Red: Our Hemispheric Crisis, originally published in 1962.

== Personal life ==
After a short illness, he died in San Francisco, California on July 15, 1970. He was survived by his widow, Denece, and was buried at Targhee Cemetery in Fremont County, Idaho.
