= Edward J. Noble =

American broadcasting and candy industrialist (1882–1958)

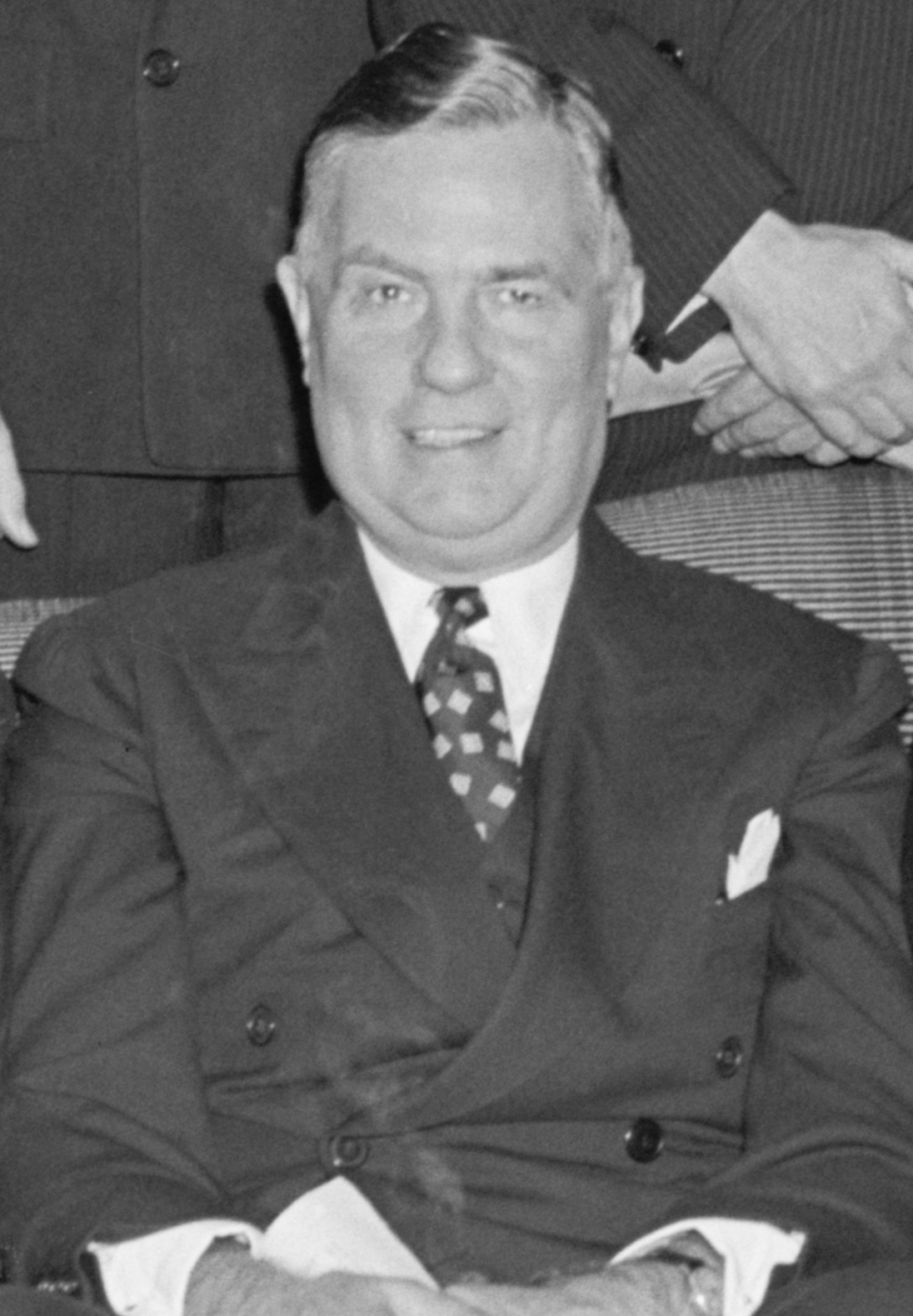
- Photograph of Noble, 1939

Under Secretary of Commerce
- In office 1939–1940
- Preceded by: Inaugural holder
- Succeeded by: Wayne Chatfield-Taylor

Personal details
- Born: Edward John Noble; August 8, 1882 Gouverneur, New York, U.S.
- Died: December 28, 1958 (aged 76) Greenwich, Connecticut, U.S.
- Education: Syracuse University
- Alma mater: Yale University

Edward John Noble (August 8, 1882 – December 28, 1958) was an American broadcasting and candy industrialist originally from Gouverneur, New York. He co-founded the Life Savers Corporation in 1913. He founded the American Broadcasting Company when he purchased the Blue Network in 1943 following the Federal Communications Commission's (FCC) decree that RCA divest itself of one of its two radio networks.

== Early life and education ==
Noble was born in Gouverneur, New York on August 8, 1882, the younger of two sons, to Harvey H. Noble (1847–1925) and Edna L. (née Wood; 1855–1932) Noble. He also had one sister. His father initially was a railway worker as telegraph operator, later he became a bookkeeper at the Bank of Gouverneur. After being educated at local public schools, Noble attended Syracuse University for one year; he then transferred to Yale, "graduating with a bachelor of arts degree in 1905."

== Career ==
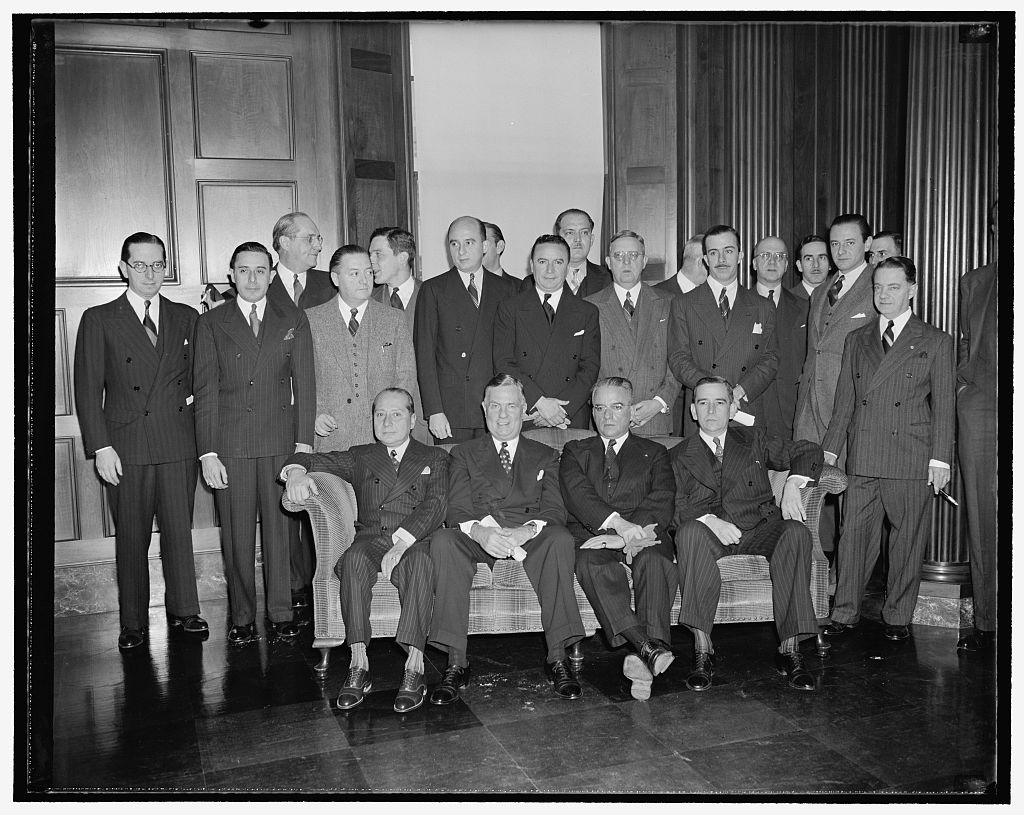
Edward J Noble seated second from left at the Conference of Latin American Retailers

In 1912, chocolate manufacturer Clarence Crane of Cleveland, Ohio, invented Life Savers as a "summer candy" that could withstand heat better than chocolate. Since the peppermints looked like miniature life preservers, he called them Life Savers. After registering the trademark, Noble bought the rights to the candy for $2,900. Instead of using cardboard rolls, which were not very successful, he created tin-foil wrappers to keep the mints fresh. Pep-O-Mint was the first Life Savers flavor. Life Savers Limited merged with Beech-Nut in 1956.

Noble was the first chairman of the Civil Aeronautics Authority. In June 1939, he was appointed the first Under Secretary of Commerce by President Franklin D. Roosevelt, a role created especially for him, serving until August 1940 (Wayne Chatfield-Taylor was appointed to replace him). Following the Federal Communications Commission's order that RCA divest itself of one of its two radio networks, he founded the American Broadcasting Company (ABC) when he purchased the Blue Network (formerly part of NBC) on October 12, 1943. He tried to build ABC into an innovative and competitive broadcaster, but was hampered by financial problems and the pressure of competing with long-established NBC and CBS. By 1951, he entered negotiations to merge the network with United Paramount Theaters, headed by Leonard Goldenson; Goldenson became chairman of the ABC network, while Noble sat on its board of directors for the rest of his life.

Noble died at 76 in his Greenwich home on December 28, 1958, after several months of illness.

== Legacy ==
In 1943, Noble bought the St. Catherines Island on the coast of Georgia; in 1968, ten years after his death, the island was transferred to the Edward J. Noble Foundation.

The island is now owned by the St. Catherines Island Foundation, and the island's interior is operated for charitable, scientific, literary, and educational purposes. The foundation aims to promote conservation of natural resources, the survival of endangered species, and the preservation of historic sites, and to expand human knowledge in the fields of ecology, botany, zoology, natural history, archaeology, and other scientific and educational disciplines.

Noble was part of the St. Lawrence Seaway Project and was appointed to the advisory board by President Dwight D. Eisenhower in 1954. He owned Boldt Castle, the Thousand Island Club, and a summer residence on Wellesley Island. The ornamental street lights in the village park are all that remain of the gift of new street lights that were given to the village by Edward and his brother, Robert. The lights were in memory of their father.

Three hospitals and a foundation are named after him. A building on the campus of St. Lawrence University in Canton, New York is also named after him.

== Personal life ==
On November 6, 1920, Noble married Ethel Louise Tinkham (1884–1975), of Napanoch in Ulster County, in New York City. They had two daughters:

- June Noble (June 17, 1922 – June 23, 2020), who was married to United States ambassador to Sweden David Shiverick Smith
- Sally Noble (July 10, 1924 – February 9, 1944), who died from a sudden illness at age 19
