= Alfred Schindler (industrialist) =

American industrialist

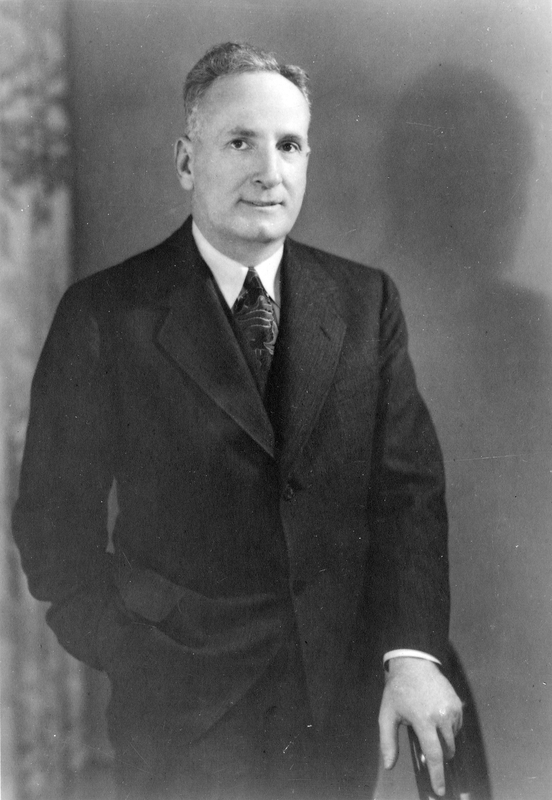

United States Secretary of Commerce
- Acting; September 20, 1946 – October 7, 1946
- President: Harry S. Truman
- Preceded by: Henry A. Wallace
- Succeeded by: W. Averell Harriman

United States Under Secretary of Commerce
- In office 1945–1946
- President: Franklin D. Roosevelt; Harry S. Truman
- Preceded by: Wayne Chatfield-Taylor
- Succeeded by: William Chapman Foster

Personal details
- Born: 1894
- Died: January 2, 1987 (aged 92) St. Louis, Missouri
- Party: Republican

Alfred E. Schindler (1894 – January 2, 1987) was an American industrialist who served as the acting secretary of commerce under President Truman.

== Career ==
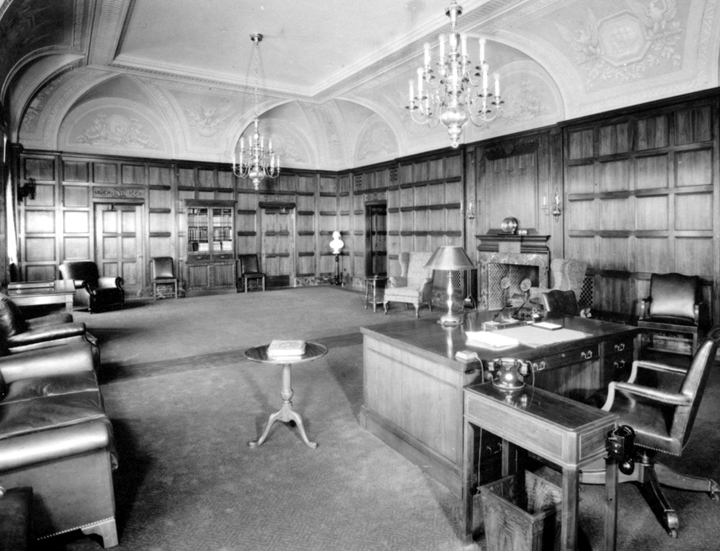
The Commerce Secretary's office as it looked in the mid-20th century.

Schindler served as the head salesman for the Ralston Purina of St. Louis, Missouri before retiring in 1941. He became chief of the consultant division of the Defense Plant Corporation where he headed a staff of business men and industrialists, arranging for the building of thousands of war plants between January 1942 and May 1943. He also served as a member of the National Civilian Defense Committee and helped to organize civilian defense in the midwest.

In April 1945, President Franklin D. Roosevelt appointed Schindler to replace Wayne Chatfield-Taylor as the under secretary of commerce. Schindler, a Republican, was an old friend of Roosevelt's commerce secretary Henry A. Wallace (Roosevelt's vice president of the United States from 1941 to 1945 before Truman) and was serving as the executive director of the Committee for Economic Development in the St. Louis area. He had also served as a special assistant to Jesse H. Jones, the former secretary of commerce and Federal Loan Administrator. In September 1946, President Truman fired Wallace for delivering a speech urging conciliatory policies towards the Soviet Union, and asked his "personal friend" Schindler to serve as acting secretary, although Schindler had been planning to retire from the government service and enter business on the West Coast. Schindler felt that "the Department of Commerce should be the business man's home in Government."

Although considered the most likely successor to Wallace as commerce secretary, Truman appointed W. Averell Harriman as appointed as secretary of the treasury. After Harriman took office, he persuaded Schindler to stay in his role for a few months before returning to private industry. Truman appointed New York businessman William Chapman Foster as Schindler's successor as under secretary, and Schindler returned to St. Louis.

In 1947, he was elected president of the National Federation of Sales Executives and in 1948, he was elected to their board of directors. Schindler gave talks stressing public service and free enterprise. In 1961, he donated his papers to the Harry S. Truman Presidential Library and Museum.

== Personal life ==
Schindler died of infirmities at his home in St. Louis on January 2, 1987, and his funeral was held at Unity Christ Church in Clayton, Missouri. He was survived by his wife Katherine Schindler.
