= Alan S. Boyd =

American politician (1922–2020)

Alan Boyd
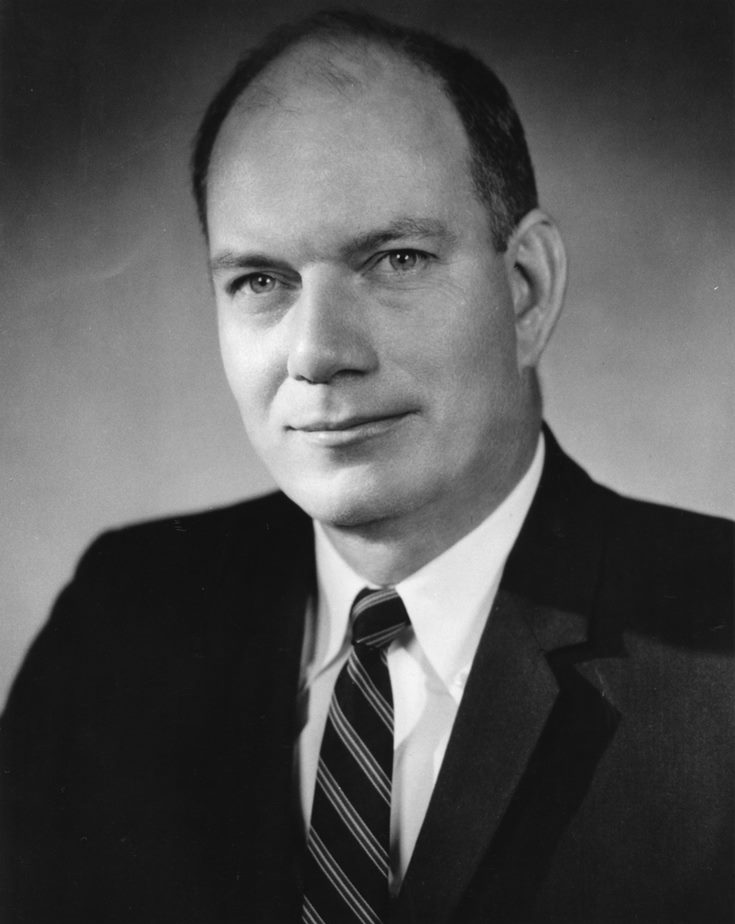

1st United States Secretary of Transportation
- In office January 16, 1967 – January 20, 1969
- President: Lyndon B. Johnson
- Preceded by: Position established
- Succeeded by: John A. Volpe

Personal details
- Born: July 20, 1922 Jacksonville, Florida, U.S.
- Died: October 18, 2020 (aged 98) Seattle, Washington, U.S.
- Party: Democratic
- Spouse: Flavil Townsend (m. 1943; died 2007)
- Children: Mark
- Education: University of Florida (BA); University of Virginia (LLB)

Military service
- Allegiance: United States
- Branch/service: United States Army
- Unit: Army Air Forces
- Battles/wars: World War II

Alan Stephenson Boyd (July 20, 1922 – October 18, 2020) was an American attorney and transportation executive who led several large corporations and also served the U.S. Government in various transportation-related positions. He was the first United States Secretary of Transportation, appointed by Lyndon Johnson. Additionally, he served in executive positions with the Civil Aeronautics Board, the U.S. Department of Commerce, and was a president of Amtrak.

== Early life and education ==
Boyd was born in Jacksonville, Florida, on July 20, 1922, to Clarence and Elizabeth (Stephenson) Boyd. He graduated from Macclenny–Glen High School in 1939, and went on to study at the University of Florida. However, he dropped out at the end of his sophomore year. He subsequently joined the United States Army Air Forces in 1942 and remained there through the end of World War II.

After leaving the service in 1945, Boyd returned to college and received his Bachelor of Laws from the University of Virginia School of Law in 1948.

== Career ==
=== Early positions ===
Boyd practiced law in Florida, and was on a commission exploring the regulation of the transportation industry. He was appointed to the Civil Aeronautics Board by Dwight Eisenhower in 1959. He was promoted to chairman of that board by John F. Kennedy. He contributed to the standardization of fare reductions and approved of government subsidies to encourage airline service for smaller cities. He was appointed Under secretary of commerce for transportation in 1965 by Lyndon Johnson. He was unpopular with labor leaders when he advocated reducing government restrictions on the maritime industry, and when he denounced featherbedding by railroad workers. Boyd was part of a committee that lobbied for the creation of the United States Department of Transportation, bringing together many government agencies related to the transportation industry.

=== Secretary of Transportation ===
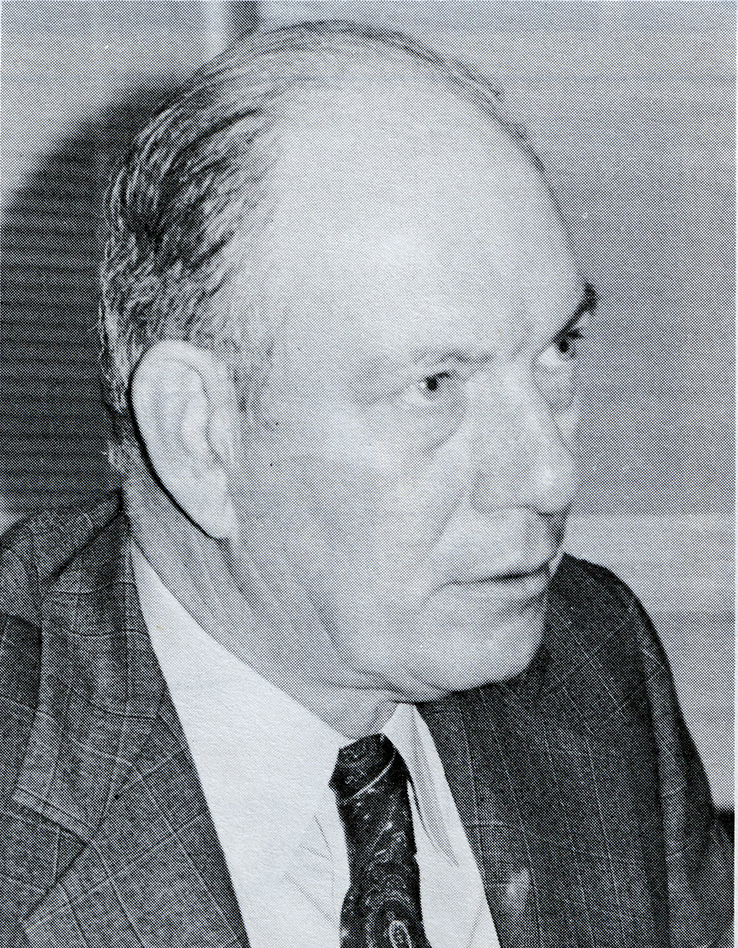
Alan Boyd

Boyd became the first Secretary of Transportation in November 1966. In that capacity he worked in many areas including airports, the air traffic control system, automobile safety, driver education, alcoholism, and the highway beautification program (a pet project of first lady Lady Bird Johnson). One of his sources of power was holding funding control over the interstate highways. He was unsuccessful in trying to encourage passenger train service.

When Richard Nixon became United States president in January 1969, Boyd left the Transportation Department to become the president of the Illinois Central Railroad, a position he held from 1969 to 1972. The federal government investigated the potential conflict of interest because that railroad had received aid from Boyd's department before he resigned, but no wrongdoing was found. Boyd was later the president of Amtrak until June 20, 1982, and the president of Airbus Industrie of North America, Inc. He became the chairman of Warner Blue & Mahan, a Washington, D.C.–based consulting firm working on new technology ventures, in 1994.

=== Later life and death ===
Boyd married Flavil Juanita Townsend, a high school teacher, on April 3, 1943. Together, they had one son (Mark).

After Boyd retired, he and his wife moved to Seattle. He received the Tony Jannus Award for his contributions to commercial aviation in 1994. He also received the 2009 Philip J. Klass Award for Lifetime Achievement from Aviation Week & Space Technology. The citation read: "... for his lifelong service to aviation, including shaping policy in the U.S."

Boyd published an autobiography, A Great Honor: My Life Shaping 20th Century Transportation in August 2016.

Boyd died on October 18, 2020, at a retirement home in Ravenna, Seattle. He was 98, and suffered from failing eyesight in the last five years of life.

== See also ==
- List of railroad executives

Political offices
| New office | United States Secretary of Transportation; 1966–1969 | Succeeded by John A. Volpe |
Business positions
| Preceded by William B. Johnson | President of Illinois Central Railroad; 1969-1972 | Succeeded by William J. Taylor |
| Preceded by Paul Reistrup | President of Amtrak; 1978–1982 | Succeeded by W. Graham Claytor Jr. |
