= Harvey Hancock =

American journalist

- Harvey Hancock, standing, with Ronald Reagan and Richard Nixon flanking him, and Glenn Seaborg to Nixon's left. Summer, 1967 in Owls Nest Camp at the Bohemian Grove
- Born: George Harvey Hancock; January 2, 1900; Mendon, Cache County, Utah, US
- Died: January 8, 1996 (aged 96); Monterey, California, US
- Occupations: Executive, journalist, political consultant

George Harvey Hancock (January 2, 1900 – January 8, 1996), known as Harvey Hancock, was an aviation executive and a journalist who served as the Northern California campaign manager for Richard Nixon's successful 1950 United States Senate race and then the 1952 general election won by Dwight D. Eisenhower and Nixon.

== Life and career ==
Hancock was born in Mendon, Cache County, Utah on January 2, 1900, to Joseph William Hancock and Agnes Richards. Hancock enlisted in the infantry in World War I. In 1925, he graduated from the University of Utah, where he had been a member of the fraternity Sigma Chi, editor of the Utah Humbug (a small campus publication), and the varsity football captain. Hancock worked as a newspaper reporter in Salt Lake City, and then as editor, for The Salt Lake Tribune. After ten years of news, Hancock changed careers from journalism to the airline industry by taking a management position with United Airlines and Pan American World Airways.

In his promotional role with the Pan American, Hancock became acquainted with influential people all over California. He attracted attention from Republican Party stalwarts and was asked in 1949 to help manage Nixon's senatorial campaign, and came on board as "the pro" behind John Walton Dinkelspiel. Hancock and Dinkelspiel ran the northern half of California, while Bernard Brennan and Murray Chotiner covered the south. Hancock estimated that his half of the campaign would cost $34,050, but it ended some $10,000 beyond that. Hancock set up Nixon-for-Senator committees in counties and large cities. Hancock helped Nixon get large campaign contributions from influential people such as George Toland Cameron, publisher of the San Francisco Chronicle, and escorted Nixon to some of his public appearances. Hancock arranged for radio spots, billboard coverage and newspaper articles, in concert with Chotiner's efforts, but with a degree of independence. When Chotiner produced the infamous "pink sheet", which implied that Helen Gahagan Douglas had Communist sympathies, Hancock refused to distribute it in Northern California. Nixon won the race in 1950, and Hancock was picked to manage the 1952 presidential campaign for Eisenhower and Nixon, covering the same territory. Eisenhower and Nixon won the race.

In the 1970s, Hancock lived in Carmel-by-the-Sea.

Hancock died on January 8, 1996, in Monterey, California.
