= Ivan J. Barrett =

American academic (1910–1999)

Ivan Junius Barrett (April 4, 1910 – August 16, 1999) was an American author, professor, and historian of the Church of Jesus Christ of Latter-day Saints (LDS Church).

Barrett was born in Mendon, Utah. As a young man he served in the LDS Church's Central States Mission. He received his bachelor's degree from Utah State University and his master's degree from Brigham Young University. Barrett was a longtime employee of the Church Educational System filling many positions, including starting the first LDS Seminary in Nevada.

Barrett wrote Heroic Women of Mormondom; Major Lot Smith, Mormon Raider; Trumpet of God; Eph Hanks and Joseph Smith and the Restoration.

Barrett was a religion professor at Brigham Young University for 40 years, from 1953 to 1993.

In the LDS Church, Barrett served as a branch president, bishop, district president (in Israel), stake president and patriarch, among other callings. He was also president of the Northwestern States Mission of the LDS Church from 1964 to 1966.

Barrett and his wife Minnie were the parents of five daughters. Barrett died of a heart attack in his Orem home.

== Selected BYU Speeches ==
Ivan J. Barrett delivered devotional addresses at Brigham Young University focused on doctrine, faith, and Church history:

- "Joseph Smith: Chosen of God, Friend of Man" – August 12, 1975
- "Walking in the Footsteps of Jesus" – August 2, 1981

== Sources ==
- BYU Magazine letters about Berrett
- Obituary, Deseret News, Aug. 18, 1999
- Deseret News, Aug. 19, 1999 article on Barrett's death
- Report of Barrett's being a speaker at Mendon May Day, 1959
