= Forster Hotel =

Historic house in Utah, United States

- U.S. National Register of Historic Places
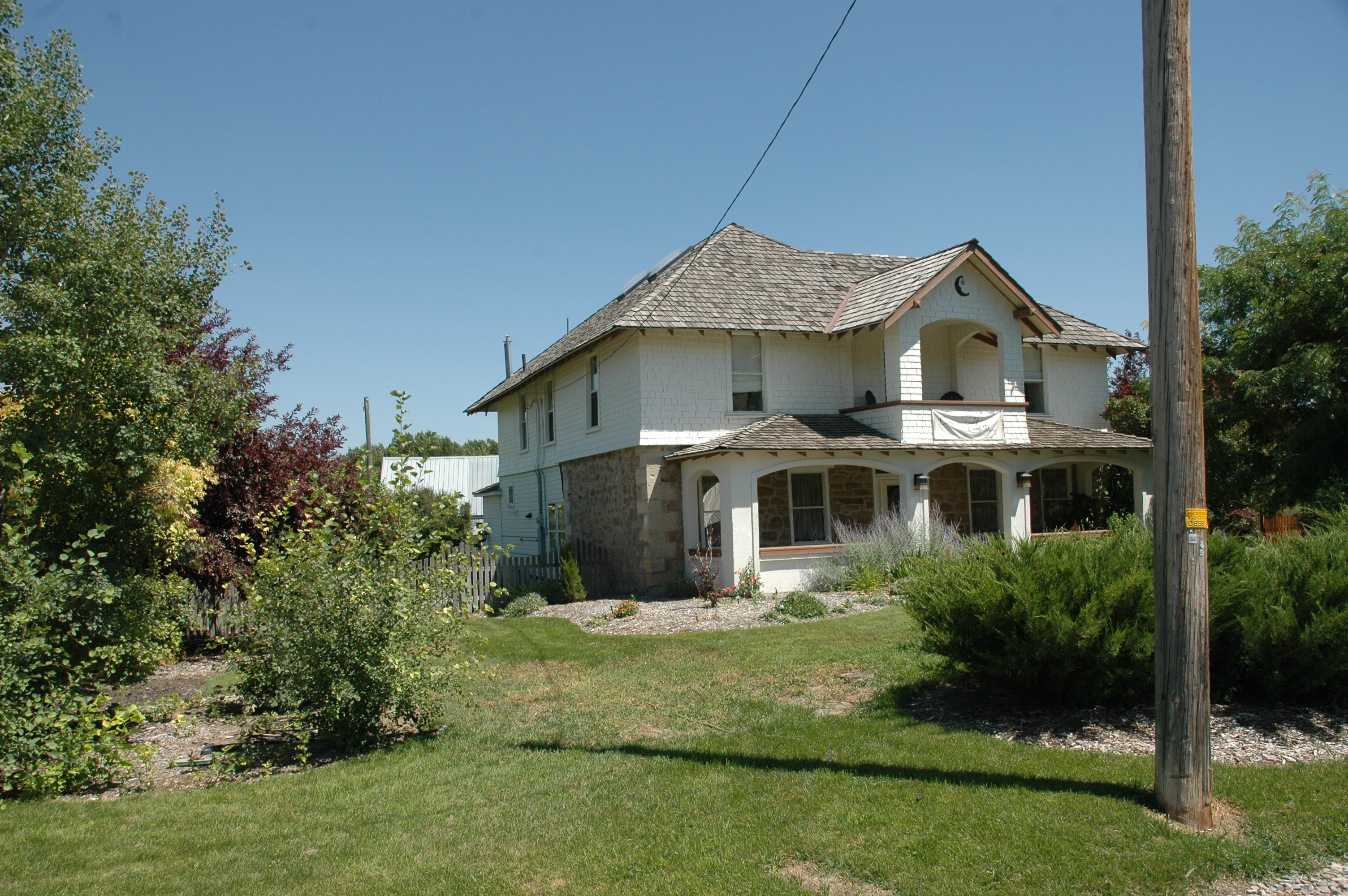

- Location within Utah Location within the United States
- Location: 176 N. 100 West, Mendon, Utah
- Coordinates: 41°42′40″N 111°58′41″W
- Area: 1.3 acres (0.53 ha)
- Built: 1870
- Built by: Crookston, Robert; et al.
- Architectural style: Mid 19th Century Revival, Bungalow/Craftsman
- NRHP reference No.: 08000058
- Added to NRHP: February 19, 2008

The Forster Hotel, built in 1870 and expanded in 1913, is a property on the National Register of Historic Places in Mendon, Utah, United States. It was listed on the National Register in 2008 for its historical and architectural qualities.

== Description ==
The hotel is 40 by 19 feet (12.2 m × 5.8 m) in plan, with its stone section's walls 16 inches (41 cm) thick, built of random rubble masonry, and with ashlar quoins at the corners.

Relating to its history, the 2008 NRHP nomination states that "the building is associated with the early settlement of Mendon and was built by Ralph Forster, one of the first permanent settlers in the Cache Valley. Ralph Forster and his wife, Margaret McCulloch, made the stone house their home, but also used it as one of two early hotels in the settlements, which is its primary significance. Ralph and Margaret's children expanded the hotel in 1913. For over forty-five years, the Forster Hotel served the community providing accommodations for railroad workers, traveling salesmen, theatrical companies, and weekend visitors to the Mendon horse races. Although it has been a single-family residence since the 1940s, the house is still known as the Forster Hotel by current Mendon residents. It is a local landmark and one of the largest extant historic buildings in the community."

Relating to its architecture, the 2008 NRHP nomination states the building is significant "as a unique example of an early Mendon traditional stone house expanded using the bungalow-craftsman style into a substantial full-service hotel. Both the original stone building and the expansion, as built by Logan contractors Wesley and Nelson, display a high degree of craftsmanship. Although somewhat modified on the rear elevation in 2002, the Forster Hotel retains much of its historic integrity and is a contributing resource in Mendon, Utah."

== See also ==
- National Register of Historic Places listings in Cache County, Utah
