= United States Under Secretary of Commerce =

Flag of an under secretary of commerce

A United States under secretary of commerce is one of several positions in the United States Department of Commerce, serving under the United States Secretary of Commerce.

== History ==
In June 1939, Edward J. Noble was appointed the first under secretary of commerce a role created especially for him by President Franklin D. Roosevelt that had a salary of $10,000 per year. He was succeeded by Wayne Chatfield-Taylor, the former Assistant Secretary of the Treasury who later served as president of the Export-Import Bank. The role was later held by various prominent people, including Cornelius Vanderbilt Whitney (under President Truman), and Franklin D. Roosevelt Jr. (under Presidents Kennedy and Johnson), when the job had a salary of $21,000 per year. On December 13, 1979, President Jimmy Carter replaced the role of under secretary, which was then held by Luther H. Hodges Jr., with United States Deputy Secretary of Commerce, and Hodges became the first holder.

=== Transportation ===
In 1950, President Truman proposed transferring the functions of the Maritime Commission to the Department of Commerce to be led by the newly created Under Secretary of Commerce for Transportation. Truman had created Civil Aeronautics Administration and transferred the Bureau of Public Roads within the department the previous year. In 1966, all transportation activities of Commerce were moved to the newly established United States Department of Transportation, which was led by former Under Secretary Alan Stephenson Boyd.

== Current positions ==
The under secretary positions are:

- Under Secretary of Commerce for Economic Affairs (created June 16, 1982)
- Under Secretary of Commerce for Industry and Security (created 2001)
- Under Secretary of Commerce for Intellectual Property (created January 17, 2001)
- Under Secretary of Commerce for International Trade (created January 1, 1989)
- Under Secretary of Commerce for Oceans and Atmosphere (created December 1971)
- Under Secretary of Commerce for Standards and Technology (created 2010)
- Under Secretary of Commerce for Minority Business Development (created 2022)

== Former under secretaries ==
=== List of former under secretaries of commerce ===
Image	Name	Term began	Term ended	President(s) served under
	Edward J. Noble	1939	1940	Franklin D. Roosevelt
	Wayne Chatfield-Taylor	1940	1945	Franklin D. Roosevelt
	Alfred Schindler	1945	1946	Harry S. Truman
	William Chapman Foster	1946	1948	Harry S. Truman
	Charles W. Sawyer	1948	1949	Harry S. Truman
	Cornelius Vanderbilt Whitney	1949	1950	Harry S. Truman
	W. Walter Williams	1952	1958	Dwight D. Eisenhower
	Philip A. Ray	1959	1961	Dwight D. Eisenhower
	Edward Gudeman	1961	1963	John F. Kennedy
	Franklin D. Roosevelt Jr.	1963	1965	John F. Kennedy; Lyndon B. Johnson
	LeRoy Collins	1965	1966	Lyndon B. Johnson
	John Herbert Hollomon Jr.	1967	1967	Lyndon B. Johnson
	Howard J. Samuels	1967	1969	Lyndon B. Johnson
	Joseph W. Bartlett	1968	1969	Lyndon B. Johnson
	Rocco C. Siciliano	1969	1971	Richard Nixon
	James Thomas Lynn	1971	1973	Richard Nixon
	John K. Tabor	1973	1975	Gerald Ford
	James Baker	1975	1976	Gerald Ford
	Edward O. Vetter	1976	1977	Gerald Ford
	Sidney Harman	1977	1978	Jimmy Carter
	Luther H. Hodges Jr.	1978	1979	Jimmy Carter

=== List of former under secretaries of commerce for transportation ===
Image	Name	Term began	Term ended	President(s) served under
	Philip B. Fleming	1950	1951	Harry S. Truman
	Delos W. Rentzel	1951	1951	Harry S. Truman
	Jack Garrett Scott	1952	1953	Harry S. Truman
	Robert B. Murray Jr.	1953	1955	Dwight D. Eisenhower
	Louis S. Rothschild	1955	1958	Dwight D. Eisenhower
	John J. Allen Jr.	1959	1961	Dwight D. Eisenhower
	Clarence D. Martin Jr.	1961	1965	John F. Kennedy; Lyndon B. Johnson
	Alan Stephenson Boyd	1965	1966	Lyndon B. Johnson
