= Murray Chotiner =

American lawyer (1909–1974)

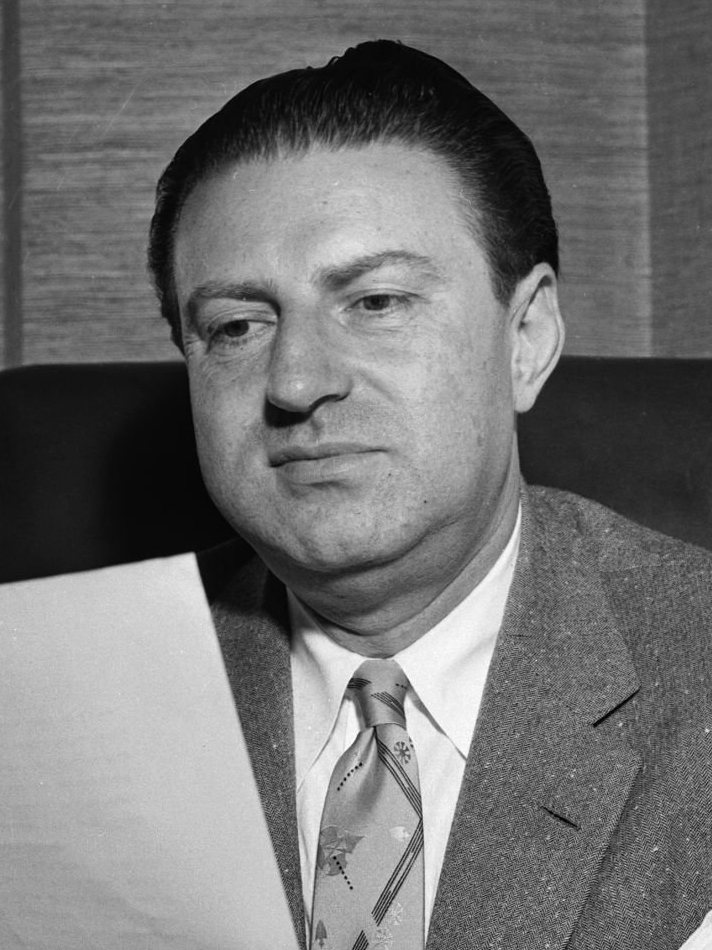
- Chotiner in 1956
- Born: Murray M Chotiner; October 4, 1909; Pittsburgh, Pennsylvania, U.S.
- Died: January 30, 1974 (aged 64); Washington, D.C., U.S.
- Resting place: National Memorial Park, Falls Church, Virginia
- Education: University of California, Los Angeles; Southwestern School of Law
- Occupations: Lawyer; political consultant
- Years active: 1930–1974
- Known for: Richard Nixon's adviser and campaign manager
- Political party: Republican
- Spouses: Phyllis Lee Chotiner (m. 1932; div. 1955) Ruth Arnold Chotiner (m. 1956; div. 1963) Mimi Chotiner (m. 1965; div. 1971) Nancy Chotiner (m. 1971)

Murray M Chotiner (October 4, 1909 – January 30, 1974) was an American political strategist, attorney, government official, and close associate and friend of President Richard Nixon during much of the 37th President's political career. He served as campaign manager for the future president's successful runs for the United States Senate in 1950 and for the vice presidency in 1952, and managed the campaigns of other California Republicans. He was active in each of Nixon's two successful runs for the White House in low-profile positions.

Chotiner was born in Pittsburgh, Pennsylvania; his father moved the family to California and then abandoned his wife and children. Murray Chotiner attended UCLA, and graduated from the Southwestern School of Law. He practiced law in Los Angeles, and branched out into public relations. Involving himself in Republican politics, he played an active part in several political campaigns and made an unsuccessful run for the California State Assembly in 1938.

Nixon retained Chotiner as a consultant to his first congressional campaign in 1946. In an era when the perceived threat of communism was a major domestic issue, Chotiner advised the future president to link his liberal opponent, Representative Jerry Voorhis, to a political organization which was believed to be communist-dominated. Nixon was elected, and hired Chotiner to run his 1950 Senate campaign against Representative Helen Gahagan Douglas. Chotiner used a similar strategy in that campaign, stressing Douglas' liberal voting record and printing the accusations on pink paper to hint at communist sympathy. Nixon eventually defeated Douglas by nearly nineteen points. Chotiner next managed Nixon's 1952 vice presidential campaign. He counseled Nixon through allegations of antisemitism and revelations that there were privately run funds to pay Nixon's political expenses—revelations that the candidate decisively overcame with his televised Checkers speech.

After Congress investigated Chotiner in 1956, suspecting he was using his connections to Nixon for influence peddling to benefit his private legal clients, the vice president and his former campaign manager temporarily parted ways. Nixon recalled him to work on his unsuccessful 1962 campaign for Governor of California, and again for his successful 1968 presidential bid. After Nixon was inaugurated in 1969, Chotiner received a political appointment to a government position and, in 1970, became a member of the White House staff. He returned to private practice a year later, but was involved in Nixon's 1972 re-election campaign. Chotiner described the Watergate break-in that occurred during Nixon's 1972 campaign and that eventually brought down the Nixon administration as "stupid", and when a newspaper accused him of organizing it, he sued for libel and won a substantial settlement. He remained an informal adviser to Nixon until he died in Washington, D.C., following an auto accident in January 1974, and Nixon mourned the loss of a man he described as a counselor and friend.

== Early life and career ==
Chotiner was born on October 4, 1909, in Pittsburgh, Pennsylvania, the son of Albert Hyman Chotiner and Sarah Chotiner. The family moved to Columbus, Ohio, soon after Murray's birth, and relocated to California in 1920. Albert Chotiner, a cigar maker by trade, managed a chain of movie theaters in California, and soon abandoned his wife and children.

After attending the University of California, Los Angeles, Chotiner enrolled at the Southwestern School of Law, graduating at age 20, the youngest graduate in the school's history. However, he had to wait until he was 21 to be eligible to take the bar exam. He initially practiced law with his older brother, Jack—they had a general practice in which they defended a number of bookmakers—but eventually the Chotiners dissolved the partnership, and Murray Chotiner opened a law practice on his own in Los Angeles. He later described many of his clients as "unsavory, to say the least". In the early 1940s, he branched out into public relations.

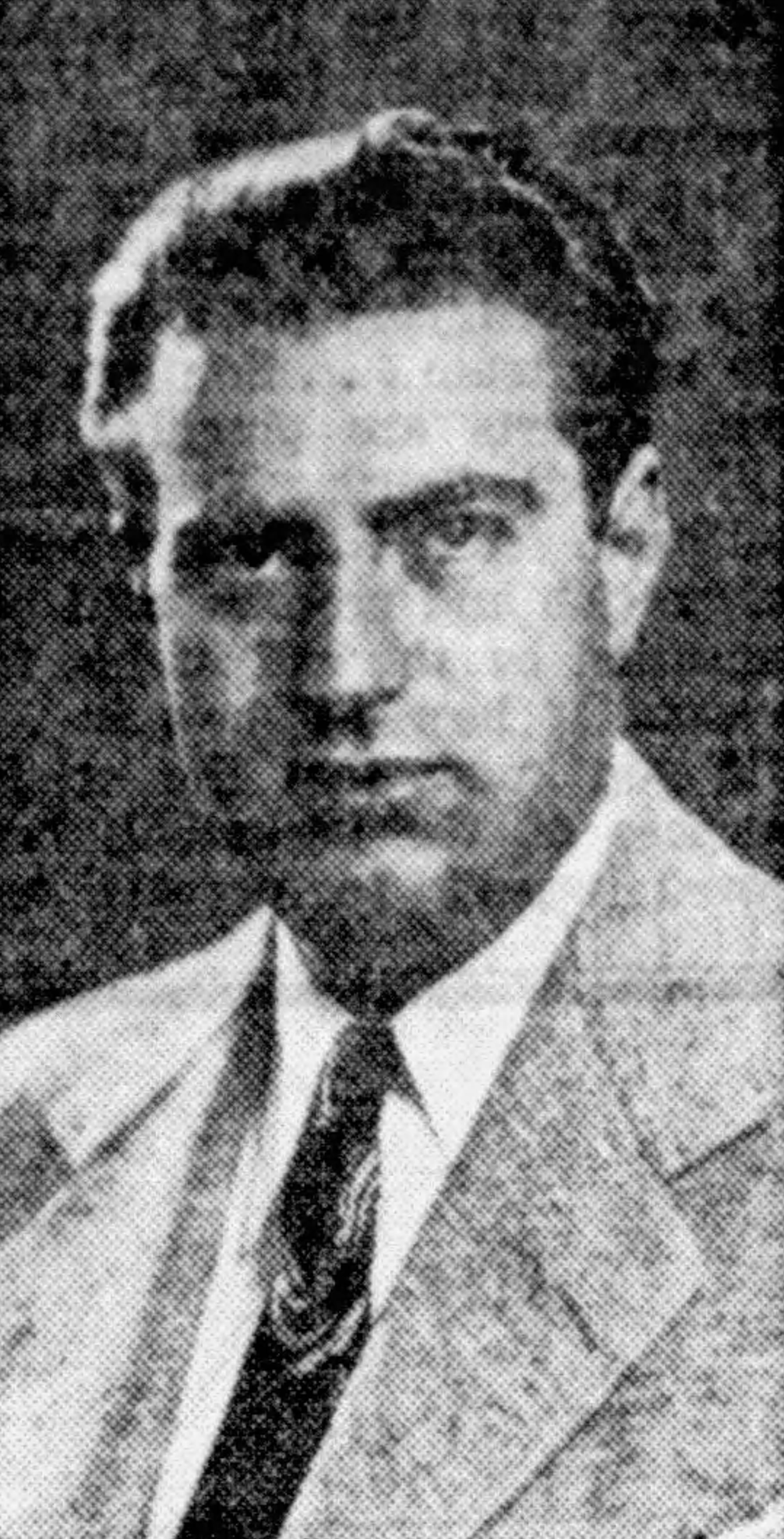
Chotiner c. 1943

Chotiner initially registered to vote as a Democrat, but soon switched parties, joining the Republicans. He involved himself in Republican politics, working on Herbert Hoover's unsuccessful presidential re-election campaign in the 1932 presidential election. In 1938, the young attorney ran against longtime Republican incumbent Charles W. Lyon for the California State Assembly. Lyon cross-filed and secured his re-election by winning both primaries, defeating Chotiner in the Republican poll, and narrowly beating Robert A. Heinlein (who subsequently turned to writing science fiction) in the Democratic contest.

When Earl Warren successfully ran for Governor of California in 1942, Chotiner served as his field director. However, he alienated Warren when, hoping for a favor in light of his 1942 support, he asked the newly inaugurated governor to decline to approve the extradition of one of his clients to another state. Warren had Chotiner thrown out of his office, and the future chief justice refused to let him have anything to do with his re-election campaign in 1946. According to Nixon biographer Earl Mazo, Chotiner stated that while people remembered him for "making" Richard Nixon, "the real man I created was Earl Warren".

Chotiner served as counsel to state committees investigating violence in motion picture strikes and conditions in children's boarding homes and in homes for the elderly. In 1944, Chotiner was elected president of the conservative California Republican Assembly, a grassroots organization of party activists; he had previously served as president of the Los Angeles Republican Assembly. In addition to his political involvement, he was active in the Los Angeles Jewish Community Relations Committee.

== Rise of Richard Nixon (1946–1952) ==
=== Congressional races ===
One of the first professional campaign managers; Chotiner was retained as a political consultant by Nixon's 1946 campaign for Congress against incumbent Representative Jerry Voorhis. He advised linking Voorhis with a political action committee, believed to be communist-dominated, run by the Congress of Industrial Organizations. The consultant was only able to devote a limited amount of time to the Nixon campaign since he was the Southern California campaign manager for the successful re-election bid of Republican Senator William F. Knowland. Chotiner coined the campaign slogan, "We will not surrender" for Knowland, implying that Democratic challenger Will Rogers Jr. would permit communism to take over the country. Both Republican candidates defeated their opponents. Two years later, Chotiner served as Southern California campaign manager for the unsuccessful 1948 presidential bid of New York Governor Thomas E. Dewey.

In September 1949, Nixon hired Chotiner as campaign manager for his upcoming 1950 run for the United States Senate. Helen Gahagan Douglas defeated Manchester Boddy for the Democratic nomination in a primary that badly splintered the California Democratic Party, while Nixon had little effective competition for the Republican slot. Chotiner realized that Nixon could not beat Douglas by advocating more social welfare programs, so he advised his candidate to attack Douglas on the issue of communism, seen as a Democratic vulnerability. Echoing a theme used by Boddy in the primary, Chotiner linked Representative Douglas with leftist Congressman Vito Marcantonio of the socialist American Labor Party, listing the matters in which the two had voted the same way in a leaflet printed on pink paper—the "Pink Sheet"—and popularizing a label for Douglas which had been first coined by Boddy—the "Pink Lady". However, the Northern California campaign chairman for Nixon, John Dinkenspiel, and his paid assistant, Harvey Hancock, declined to use the Pink Sheet in their territory. With the Korean War raging, Douglas also tried to depict Nixon as soft on communism, stating this in her first speech of the general election campaign, but that strategy was not successful, and Chotiner noted, "She made the fatal mistake of attacking our strength instead of sticking to attacking our weakness."

Chotiner had parted ways with Governor Warren, and the popular governor, who was running for a third term, "wanted no part" of the Nixon campaign. Nonetheless, Chotiner sought to maneuver the future chief justice into an endorsement of Representative Nixon. Chotiner instructed Young Republicans head and future congressman Joseph F. Holt to follow Douglas from appearance to appearance and demand to know who she was supporting for governor. Douglas repeatedly avoided the question, but with four days to go before the election and the Democratic candidate "close to collapse" from the bitter campaign, she responded to the latest Holt needle with her "hope and pray[er]" that Democratic gubernatorial candidate James Roosevelt would be elected. A delighted Chotiner had a reporter ask Warren about Douglas's reply, and the governor commented, "In view of her statement, I might ask her how she expects I will vote when I mark my ballot for United States senator on Tuesday." Chotiner publicized this response as an endorsement of Nixon, which Warren did not deny. Both Warren and Nixon won overwhelming victories on Election Day.

Chotiner's strategy in the Nixon congressional races remains controversial. Former congressman Voorhis dubbed himself "the first victim of the Nixon-Chotiner formula for political success". Democrats labeled him a master of dirty tricks who ruthlessly destroyed Douglas's political career by intimating that she was soft on communism. Chotiner's son Kenneth later stated, "I think he really believed [Douglas] was evil ... He would equate a liberal or a Democrat with a communist." Chotiner himself said of the campaign against Douglas, "We only stated the facts. The interpretation of the facts was the prerogative of the electorate."

=== 1952 campaign ===
In 1952, Chotiner served as campaign manager for Knowland. Knowland cross-filed and won both major party primaries, virtually assuring his re-election. The strategist also served as Holt's campaign manager in the California 22nd Congressional district Republican primary. Senator Nixon endorsed Holt over State Senator Jack Tenney, and Chotiner asked Nixon to supply him with Tenney's House Un-American Activities Committee file—the state senator had once had communist leanings, though he had long renounced them. Nixon arranged for Chotiner to get the file, which was supposed to be for Congressional use only, though he apparently made no public use of the file in the campaign. Holt defeated Tenney in the primary, and went on to win the general election.

With the primary completed, Chotiner's attention turned to the 1952 Republican National Convention in Chicago. While the California delegation was pledged to Governor Warren, (who hoped to gain the Republican nomination for president in a brokered convention), the strategist realized that Nixon's best chance for advancement was in the nomination of General Dwight D. Eisenhower, who was in a close battle with Senator Robert A. Taft for the party's nomination.

Chotiner was quietly designated an alternate delegate to the convention as an original alternate had dropped out, and when Governor Warren learned of his selection, he "erupted ... furiously". Chotiner had volunteered to take care of many of the convention arrangements for the California delegation, and for the Warren campaign headquarters at the Conrad Hilton Hotel. Seeking to avoid a split with Nixon, who assured Warren that Chotiner was merely there to handle physical arrangements, the governor grudgingly allowed Chotiner to retain his roles. When the California delegation's train arrived in Chicago, the Warren campaign found that the buses which Chotiner had arranged to transport the delegation to its hotel were covered with "Eisenhower for President" banners—which the governor's supporters hastily replaced with Warren signs. Chotiner had an extra phone surreptitiously installed in the Warren headquarters so he could quietly communicate the latest developments to Nixon. He also remained in close contact with Eisenhower aide and future Attorney General, Herbert Brownell. Warren paid a courtesy call on Eisenhower, and later wrote in his memoirs, "Imagine my surprise when the doorkeeper who admitted me to the general's suite was Murray Chotiner." Eisenhower was nominated over Taft and Warren in a close, first-ballot victory. As a final indignity to Warren, it developed that Chotiner had overspent his budget, forcing the governor and others to pay hotel expenses from their own pockets.

Despite Chotiner's maneuvering for Nixon, the senator was still uncertain if he should take the vice-presidential slot if offered. Pat Nixon wanted her husband to decline it. Chotiner argued to the Nixons that if the Republicans lost, Nixon would retain his seat in the Senate, that if he served as vice president and re-entered private life, he would have a lucrative legal career, but that if Nixon did not move up to the Vice Presidency, with Senator Knowland relatively young and in good health, Nixon was likely to remain merely the junior senator from California for many years to come. Eisenhower offered Nixon the position, the senator accepted, and with Knowland's re-election bid all but won, Chotiner became Nixon's campaign manager.

Soon after Nixon's selection, controversy erupted over the senator's 1951 purchase of a home with a restrictive covenant that forbade resale or rental to Jews. Chotiner, a Jew, successfully appealed to the Anti-Defamation League and the Jewish press for support for Nixon in the controversy, providing them with a list of Jewish causes which he had favored. Nixon's staff pointed out that the covenant was, in any event, invalid because of the U.S. Supreme Court's 1948 ruling in Shelley v. Kraemer. The controversy "failed to gain fatal traction" but repeatedly surfaced in later Nixon campaigns.

When the media discovered that Nixon had received reimbursement for political expenses from a fund set up by a private group, the nominee was severely criticized, and he was pressured to give up his place on the ticket. Warren supporters, still smarting from the convention, had told reporters about the fund. Chotiner told Nixon that if he were forced off the ticket, Chotiner would hold a press conference and reveal the behind-the-scenes machinations that led to the candidate's departure, the ensuing furor being of no consequence to them, as both Nixon and Chotiner would be through in politics. His spirits revived by Chotiner's loyalty, Senator Nixon delivered the televised Checkers speech, during which he defended himself and emotionally stated he would not return a black and white dog that had been given to his children. Nixon received an outpouring of public support after the speech, but was angered at Eisenhower's hesitance to issue a statement backing him. He dictated a telegram to his secretary, Rose Mary Woods, giving up his place on the ticket, but Chotiner took the telegram and ripped it up, unsent. Nixon later praised him for his support, "In the whole fund matter, Chotiner was the strongest of all—like a rock." Eisenhower eventually supported Nixon, and the Republican ticket won a landslide victory in November.

== "Man of influence", investigations (1953–1960) ==
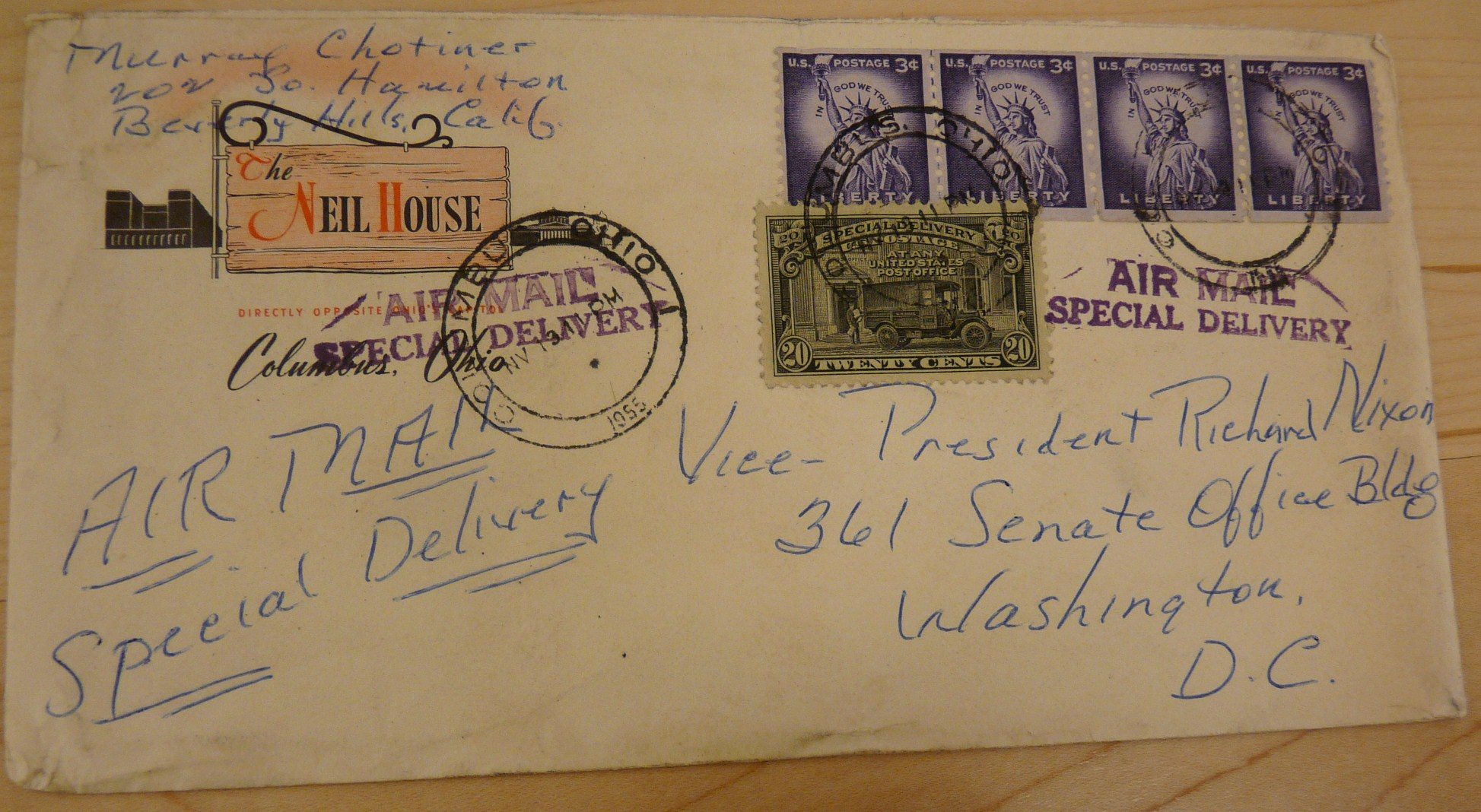
Envelope addressed to Nixon by Chotiner, 1955

With Nixon as vice president, Chotiner, "who loved politics and hated his bail bonds law practice in Beverly Hills", moved part of his legal practice to Washington. The Californian was popular with many lawyers, reporters and politicians, and displayed a quick, though sardonic sense of humor. In November 1955, Chotiner's wife, Phyllis Lee, divorced him, stating that Chotiner was often gone for weeks at a time because of his business commitments. On November 17, 1956, Chotiner married his longtime assistant, Ruth Arnold.

Despite his success in advancing Nixon's career, Chotiner was respected, but was not universally popular among the Vice President's backers. Frank Jorgensen, one of Nixon's first backers in the Voorhis race, said of the attorney, "I knew that Murray was very impatient with people who didn't have the IQ that he had. He had the habit of a man like that of tramping on them. He'd move ahead. He'd just leave the wreckage behind him, but he would get the job done." Nixon family friend and Whittier College trustee Herman Perry stated, "When Murray develops a little more of the techniques of public relations, I will be one of the first to recognize it and one of the first to give him credit ... The one thing I do not want him to do is be the quarterback and call the plays on the team on which I play."

In 1955, Chotiner lectured at the Republican national campaign school. He described his campaign philosophy:

I believe in all sincerity that if you do not deflate the opposition candidate before your own campaign gets started, the odds are you are doomed to defeat. I believe it is a smear to attack an individual on matters that have no relationship whatsoever to the campaign ... but it is not a smear if you point out the record of your opponent.

Chotiner was slated to play a major role in the Eisenhower/Nixon re-election bid. However, he had represented two Atlantic City clothing manufacturers, the Kravitz brothers, who had been fined and barred from further government contracts for fraud, and on April 25, 1956, a subcommittee of the Senate Permanent Committee on Investigations, looking into military procurement, subpoenaed him to appear before it. The senators wanted to inquire why a New Jersey firm which already had six attorneys would hire a California lawyer, especially one with close ties to Vice President Nixon.

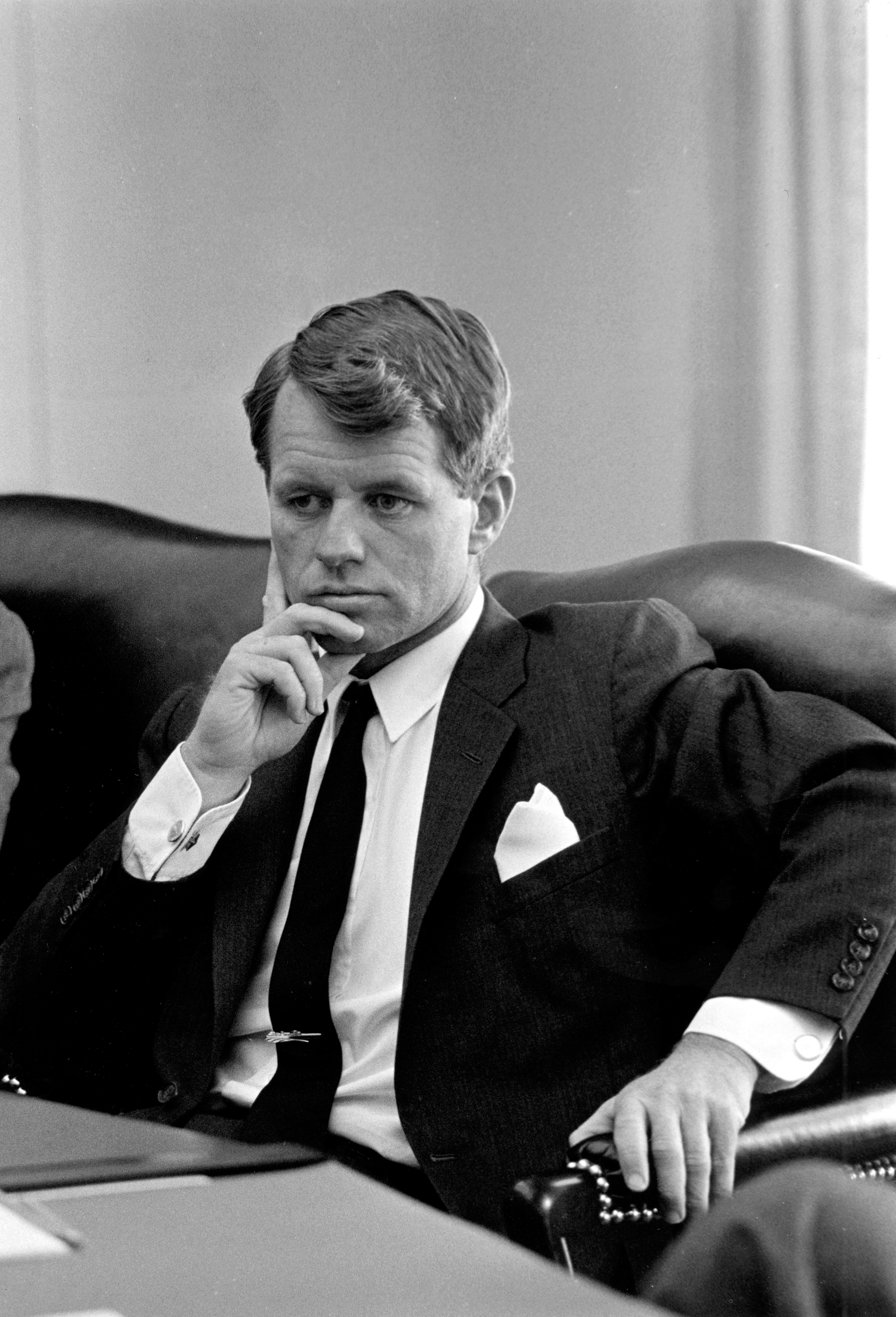
Senate subcommittee counsel Robert F. Kennedy

When Chotiner appeared before the subcommittee on May 2, he testified that he had been retained by the firm when it was seeking to expand to California, that he had conferred with Justice Department attorneys regarding the criminal charges, and that no special favors had been asked or given. Under questioning by subcommittee counsel Robert F. Kennedy, the younger brother of committee member and future president John F. Kennedy, Chotiner also disclosed that he had been retained by New Jersey mobster Marco Regnelli in an attempt to stave off a deportation order. He testified that he never discussed his clients with Nixon, and had not used the Vice President's offices for business purposes. In a press release, Chotiner fired back at Kennedy, suggesting that he had been subpoenaed for political reasons. Denying any influence peddling, Chotiner asked whether the subcommittee counsel could "explain whether any influence was used in connection with his own appointment as attorney for a subcommittee of a committee of which his brother ... is a member." Patrick Murphy Malin, head of the American Civil Liberties Union concurred that requiring Chotiner to testify had "overtones of political harassment."

On June 2, 1956, the Republican National Committee announced that Chotiner would have no role in the upcoming campaign. On June 6, a House subcommittee disclosed that the California attorney had written to President Eisenhower asking the President to intercede on behalf of Stanley D. Weiss's low-cost charter line North American Airlines (NAA) before the Civil Aeronautics Board (CAB). The attorney admitted inquiring of White House aides concerning the case, but denied using any influence on behalf of any client. White House officials said that they had done no more than ask the CAB when a decision might be expected in NAA's case, and that NAA had lost before the CAB anyway.

Congress's investigations of Chotiner continued through much of 1956, and were eventually postponed until after the election. The Senate subcommittee finally issued its report on September 5, 1957, placing no blame on Chotiner. The House investigation dragged on until 1958, by which time the focus of the investigation was on White House Chief of Staff Sherman Adams, who had sent Chotiner two letters regarding the airline matter. Nixon parted ways with Chotiner after the Senate testimony, calling his predicament "a tragedy", but by 1959, the two were friends again. Senator Knowland considered hiring Chotiner to manage his 1958 run for governor, but did not do so, and lost to Edmund G. "Pat" Brown. Chotiner would play no visible role in the unsuccessful 1960 Nixon presidential campaign. Despite his status as a political outcast, Nixon's former campaign manager remained loyal to him, and remained convinced Nixon would one day be president.

== Political wilderness and return (1960–1968) ==
Chotiner ran for the United States House of Representatives in 1960, proclaiming himself "vindicated and exonerated" by the fact that no adverse report had been issued against him by the Senate. Chotiner claimed to have Nixon's backing in the run; however, Nixon declined to make an endorsement, and the attorney was defeated by Alphonzo E. Bell in the Republican primary.

In early 1962, Chotiner managed the unsuccessful primary campaign of conservative California Senate candidate Loyd Wright, who was easily defeated by incumbent Senator Thomas H. Kuchel in the Republican primary. In August 1962, he joined Nixon's campaign for Governor of California against incumbent Democratic Governor Pat Brown as an unpaid volunteer. Chotiner and Nixon had a major disagreement, with the consultant opposing the candidate's decision to denounce the conservative John Birch Society. In its final weeks, the Brown-Nixon battle became an "alley fight", with legal battles over "smear" pamphlets distributed by each side. Chotiner's involvement and the alleged use of his techniques were issues in the campaign, with one bitter Republican describing him as "a millstone around our neck". Brown defeated Nixon in the election by five percentage points.

Five days after the election, Chotiner appeared as a Nixon defender on Howard K. Smith's News and Comment program on ABC in the episode entitled "The Political Obituary of Richard M. Nixon". Nixon nemesis Alger Hiss also appeared on the broadcast, and Hiss's participation led to such an uproar that sponsors pulled back from underwriting the program, and News and Comment left the air in the spring of 1963.

Chotiner continued to practice law. In 1962, his wife Ruth obtained an interlocutory divorce decree against him. After the decree became final, Chotiner married again in 1965. In January 1966, attorney and land developer Charles W. Hinman was arrested and charged with plotting to have Chotiner murdered. Chotiner had represented Hinman's wife in a contested divorce case, and Hinman had been jailed for eleven days for failure to pay his fees. No actual attempt on his life took place. Hinman was sentenced to between one and five years in prison. In 1957, one of Chotiner's divorce clients had been killed along with her daughter by the client's estranged husband in the attorney's Beverly Hills office.

Chotiner was involved in Nixon's successful 1968 presidential bid, but kept out of the public eye as special assistant to Nixon campaign manager John Mitchell. He served as liaison between the campaign and 14 Republican state organizations. He was able to place a "mole" on the Humphrey campaign press plane; the agent sent back almost daily reports on off-the-record or unreported comments made by the Democratic candidate and his staff, and evaluations of their morale. Kevin Phillips said of Nixon's 1968 presidential run,

[Mitchell] and Murray Chotiner were the real people in the campaign, not the artificial public relations phonies who called Nixon "the product" as if he were some kind of underarm deodorant.

== Presidential adviser (1969–1974) ==
=== Federal lawyer (1969–1971) ===
The day after Nixon's election as president in November 1968, he asked Chotiner what job he would like, and Chotiner indicated that he wanted to be chairman of the Republican National Committee (RNC), but was told that was impossible. However, Mitchell and soon-to-be White House Chief of Staff H.R. Haldeman wished to see Chotiner given a position outside the White House, as they saw him as a rival. Accordingly, they proposed that Chotiner be made RNC executive director, to wield the real power with the chairman as figurehead. A reluctant Nixon, who was worried about Chotiner's hatchet-man reputation, finally agreed, and Chotiner wrapped up his affairs in California.

Chotiner was given an office at the RNC, nominally as the official in charge of tickets for the inauguration. RNC chairman Ray Bliss and his aides were disturbed by his presence, and were told he would be gone after January 20. Meanwhile, Nixon and his aides considered a new RNC chairman, finally settling on Maryland Congressman Rogers Morton, who agreed to take the position once Bliss left, though Morton was not told of the promise to Chotiner. When the President-elect met with Bliss on January 10, 1969, he could not bring himself to fire the chairman. With the situation unresolved, and Morton's appointment unannounced, Chotiner sat in his RNC office for a month after the inauguration with nothing to do, as the RNC staff wondered at his presence.

Nixon, Haldeman, and Mitchell did nothing to clear up the situation, and Chotiner finally took action on his own and told Bliss that he was to take control. A shaken Bliss called Haldeman, who backed up Chotiner's account, and Bliss immediately resigned. Bliss's aides publicized the reasons for his resignation, and reporter David Broder contacted Chotiner, who confirmed the story. Morton refused to be a figurehead for Chotiner, or indeed to have Chotiner at the RNC in any capacity, and so stated to the media. Mitchell dispatched his subordinate, John Sears, to tell Chotiner he would have no place at the RNC. Chotiner took the bad news philosophically, stating that it was not the first time he had been treated badly, and that his estranged wife had predicted that Nixon would "screw" him.

However, some job still had to be found for Chotiner, who had wound up his California practice and sold his home. Haldeman refused to have him in the White House, and Nixon's aides deemed that the Democratic-controlled Senate was unlikely to confirm Chotiner for any post requiring its approval. On April 10, 1969, acting Special Representative for Trade Negotiations Theodore R. Gates appointed Chotiner as General Counsel to his office, as almost simultaneously, the White House announced Gates' replacement, Carl J. Gilbert. On April 1, Nixon had issued Executive Order 11463, making the position of general counsel in that office a Schedule C, or political appointment, and significantly raising the salary of the position. Nixon press secretary Ron Ziegler stated that the salary had been raised because the new incumbent was expected to play a more active role than had previous holders of the position.

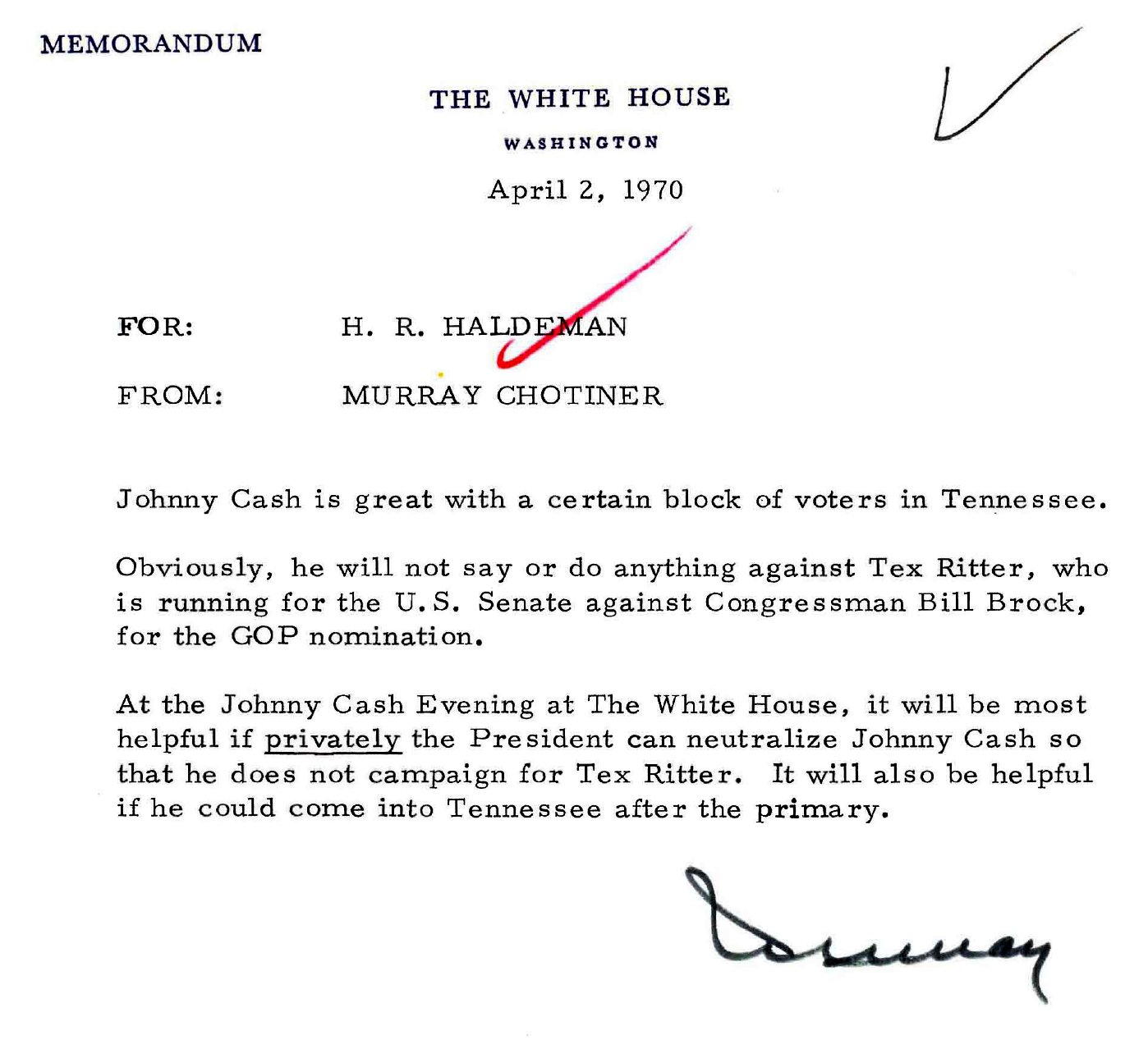
Memo from Chotiner to Haldeman suggesting Nixon "neutralize" Johnny Cash

On January 13, 1970, Nixon appointed Chotiner as a special counsel to the President, reporting to White House Chief of Staff Haldeman, a move the chief of staff described in his diaries as a "mixed blessing". Ziegler indicated that the new staffer would be handling "special projects of a wide variety", and The New York Times speculated that in view of his past, his duties would most likely be political. Haldeman noted in his diaries that his new subordinate was to serve as the "inside White House man for political campaigns". Chotiner served as liaison between the White House and Republican organizations in 31 states. Chotiner taught at a March 1970 seminar for Young Republican leaders where he suggested that the Republican running against Senator Edward Kennedy mention the Chappaquiddick incident at every opportunity, while insisting that it was not an issue in the campaign. Chotiner stated, "If he says it enough times, I think the voters of Massachusetts will understand all about Chappaquiddick."

Chotiner was involved in recruiting Republican candidates in the unsuccessful attempt to get a Republican majority in the 1970 United States Senate elections. Some of Chotiner's friends stated that Nixon involved him in this project after news reports claimed that Nixon had abandoned his former campaign manager, however, Chotiner himself denied that and stated he had been made special counsel because some people in the White House had decided he could be useful. The special counsel also coordinated Vice President Spiro Agnew's campaign against "radic lib" senatorial candidates, including New York Republican Senator Charles Goodell, who was subsequently defeated by Conservative Party candidate James L. Buckley. Chotiner stated that his twenty-year association with Nixon made it possible for him to move on matters without needing to consult the President on every detail.

=== Final years (1971–1974) ===
In January 1971, Chotiner and his third wife, Mimi, divorced on the ground of irreconcilable differences, after five years of marriage and a bitter, contested trial. Mimi Chotiner testified that the couple's matrimonial difficulties began when he left California to work for the Nixon campaign, while Murray Chotiner retorted that his wife had said that his government job in the Nixon Administration "wasn't good enough for her". Mrs. Chotiner had refused to accompany her husband to Washington, stating at trial that she remained because her children were in California schools. Murray Chotiner married again on May 30.

In March 1971, Chotiner resigned from his White House job and returned to the private practice of law. He represented former Teamsters president Jimmy Hoffa, who had been informally promised early parole from his jury tampering sentence. Chotiner wrote to Haldeman in November 1971, noting that no action on Hoffa's release seemed to be taking place, and President Nixon granted Hoffa clemency later that month. When Chotiner's role became public in 1973, he stated that he was proud of his actions on behalf of Hoffa. Chotiner also lobbied the White House on behalf of milk producers, who were seeking increased United States Department of Agriculture price supports and who were major contributors to the Republican Party. Chotiner negotiated a $2 million campaign contribution from Associated Milk Producers to the Committee for the Re-Election of the President (CRP) with John Connally and Herbert W. Kalmbach in exchange for an increase in price supports. The donation would have been illegal under the Federal Election Campaign Act, but it had not yet gone into effect. Nevertheless, the money was funneled through shell organizations created by John Dean and Bob Bennett to avoid suspicion.

During the 1972 presidential election, Chotiner served as head of the Ballot Security Task Force for the Nixon campaign, a job that The Washington Post described as "largely token". At the instructions of Mitchell, in March 1971, he hired out-of-work reporter Seymour Friedin to present himself as a working journalist and travel with the campaigns of various Democratic presidential hopefuls. Friedin sent reports back to Chotiner, who edited them, had them typed by his secretary, and forwarded them to Mitchell (who had resigned as United States Attorney General in 1972 to manage Nixon's re-election bid) and Haldeman. When Friedin secured other employment in August 1972, Chotiner replaced him with Lucianne Goldberg, who remained in that capacity for the remainder of the presidential campaign. The two journalists were collectively code-named "Chapman's Friend", and were paid $1,000 per week plus expenses from Chotiner's law office account, with the account reimbursed by the CRP. The Committee reported the payments as reimbursement of his expenses, which the General Accounting Office opined was a violation of federal election law. Chotiner, however, stated that there was "nothing underhanded or illegal" about the arrangement, and Watergate prosecutors later chose not to prosecute CRP officials concerning the payments, deciding they could not prove criminal intent.

In April 1973, the Manchester Union Leader accused Chotiner of having organized the Watergate break-in. He responded by bringing suit for libel against the Union Leader and its lead investigator. In December 1973, the parties reached a settlement by which Chotiner received an undisclosed, but substantial, sum of money and the newspaper printed a front-page apology and retraction of its accusations in its December 31, 1973 edition. Chotiner described Watergate in January 1973 as "a stupid, useless, inane experiment by people who have seen too many TV shows and especially too many productions of Mission Impossible". According to The Washington Post, Chotiner was not close to Haldeman, John Ehrlichman, and most other staffers at the White House and CRP. In a taped discussion of the fallout from Watergate, Haldeman told Nixon that his former campaign manager was not "wired in", and the President expressed strong opposition to Chotiner being used as a White House contact. At the suggestion that Chotiner could defend him, Nixon worried that the attorney might not be willing to do so.

Chotiner advised President Nixon to fire Special Prosecutor Archibald Cox in October 1973 in what became known as the Saturday Night Massacre, telling Nixon, "This guy Cox will use anything and everybody. It has to be taken away from him." According to Nixon biographer and Chotiner friend Earl Mazo, he was convinced that "Dick wouldn't have had anything to do with [the Watergate break-in]" and was also convinced that the President would put the scandal behind him by the spring of 1974. According to his brother Jack, "[h]e always considered Nixon a genius."

== Death and legacy ==
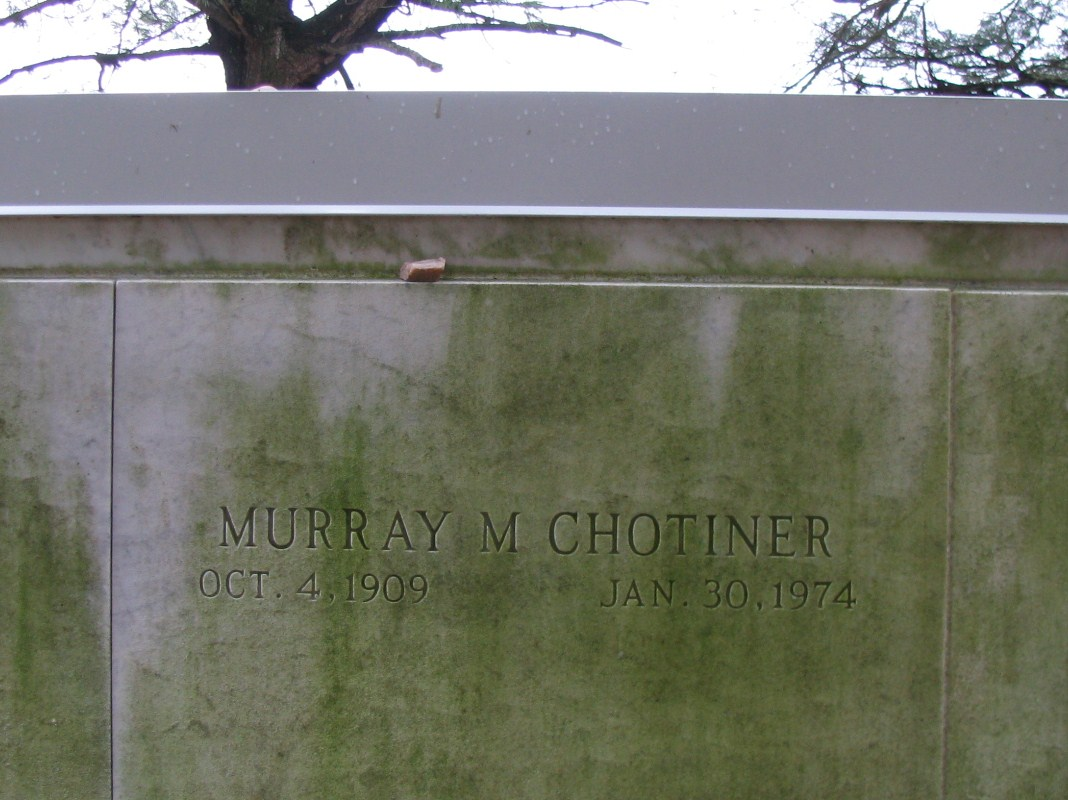
Gravesite of Murray M Chotiner, Falls Church, Virginia

On January 23, 1974, Chotiner was involved in an automobile accident on Virginia State Route 123 in McLean, Virginia, by the home of Massachusetts Democratic Senator Edward M. Kennedy, who heard the collision and called for an ambulance. Chotiner had suffered a broken leg, and appeared to be recovering. The evening before he was due to be discharged from the hospital, he started gasping uncontrollably, and X-rays revealed a blood clot near the lungs. Treatment was unsuccessful and he died of a pulmonary embolism at the Washington Hospital Center in Washington, D.C. Gerald R. Warren, Nixon's deputy press secretary, stated that President Nixon was "deeply saddened" by the news.

Nixon described Chotiner as a "valued counselor and a trusted colleague. But above all, Murray Chotiner was my friend." Chotiner was survived by his fourth wife, Nancy, his son, Kenneth, from his first marriage, two stepdaughters, Renee and Julie, and his brother. The President attended his funeral, and emotionally told Nancy Chotiner that her husband was a "great guy".

Chotiner is buried at National Memorial Park in Falls Church, Virginia. The adage known as "Chotiner's Law" is named for the former Nixon adviser. It holds that if an incumbent is seriously challenged in a primary election, he will be unable to recover and will lose the general election. Chotiner's Law has held true in every presidential election since his death.

Chotiner was known to his friends as "the perfect political technician" and to his foes as "the complete political hatchet man", but often said that he had done nothing in politics that he was not proud of. Rowland Evans and Robert Novak summed up Chotiner:

Chotiner was in many ways the most interesting personality in Nixon's political camp: aggressive, egocentric, a professional among amateurs, brilliant, overbearing, ruthless, engaging, habitually guilty of overkill, constantly enlarging his area of operation. Painted in sinister colors by the press, he was both a public relations problem for Nixon and an invaluable campaign strategist.

== Bibliography ==
- Ambrose, Stephen (1988). Nixon: The Education of a Politician. Simon & Schuster. ISBN 978-0-671-65722-2.
- Black, Conrad (2007). Richard M. Nixon: A Life in Full. New York, NY: PublicAffairs Books. ISBN 978-1-58648-519-1.
- Bochin, Hal (1990). Richard Nixon: Rhetorical Strategist. Greenwood Publishing Company. ISBN 978-0-313-26108-4.
- Cray, Ed (1997). Chief Justice: A Biography of Earl Warren. Simon & Schuster. ISBN 978-0-684-80852-9.
- Senate Select Committee on Presidential Campaign Activities (The Ervin Committee) (2005) [1974]. The Senate Watergate Report: The Final Report. introduction by Daniel Schorr. Carroll & Graf. ISBN 978-0-7867-1709-5.
- Evans, Rowland; Novak, Robert (1971). Nixon in the White House: The Frustration of Power. Random House. ISBN 978-0-394-46273-8.
- Gellman, Irwin (1999). The Contender. The Free Press. ISBN 978-1-4165-7255-8.
- Greenberg, David (2004). Nixon's Shadow: The History of an Image. W. W. Norton & Co. ISBN 978-0-393-32616-1.
- Haldeman, H. R. (1994). The Haldeman Diaries. G. P. Putnam's Sons. ISBN 978-0-399-13962-8.
- Katcher, Leo (1967). Earl Warren: A Political Biography. McGraw-Hill Book Co.
- Kutler, Stanley (1992). The Wars of Watergate. W. W. Norton & Company. ISBN 978-0-393-30827-3.
- Kutler, Stanley (2000). Abuse of Power: The New Nixon Tapes. Simon & Schuster. ISBN 978-0-684-86489-1.
- Lungren, John (2003). Healing Richard Nixon. University Press of Kentucky. ISBN 978-0-8131-2274-8.
- Maisel, L. Sandy; Forman, Ira N., eds. (2001). Jews in American Politics. Rowman & Littlefield. ISBN 978-0-7425-0181-2.
- Mazo, Earl (1959). Richard Nixon: A Political and Personal Portrait. New York, NY: Harper & Brothers Publishers.
- Morris, Roger (1990). Richard Milhous Nixon: The Rise of an American Politician. Henry Holt and Company. ISBN 978-0-8050-1834-9.
- Parmet, Herbert (1990). Richard Nixon and His America. Konecky & Konecky. ISBN 978-1-56852-082-7.
- Pitney, John (2001). The Art of Political Warfare. University of Oklahoma Press. ISBN 978-0-8061-3382-9.
- Schuparra, Kurt (1998). Triumph of the Right. M. E. Sharpe. ISBN 978-0-7656-0277-0.
- Spragens, William (1988). Popular images of American presidents. Greenwood Publishing Group. ISBN 978-0-313-22899-5.
- Voorhis, Jerry (1973). The Strange Case of Richard Milhous Nixon. Popular Library. ISBN 978-0-8397-7917-9.

Los Angeles Times

- "Kenny sweeps two tickets" (PDF). Los Angeles Times. 1938-09-01. Archived from the original (PDF) on October 19, 2012. (subscription required)
- "Structure of political party told" (PDF). Los Angeles Times. 1943-08-22. Archived from the original (PDF) on October 23, 2012. (subscription required)
- "Wife granted divorce from Atty. Chotiner". Los Angeles Times. 1955-11-09. p. 22.
- "Chotiner and bride on Hawaii honeymoon" (PDF). Los Angeles Times. 1956-11-20. Archived from the original (PDF) on October 23, 2012. (subscription required)
- Greenberg, Carl (1963-02-25). "GOP assembly rejects Birch-favored leader" (PDF). Los Angeles Times. Archived from the original (PDF) on October 23, 2012. (subscription required)
- "Marriage of Chotiner, Nixon aide, dissolved" (PDF). Los Angeles Times. 1971-01-15. Archived from the original (PDF) on October 23, 2012. (subscription required)
- "Nixon confidant Murray Chotiner weds 4th time". Los Angeles Times. 1971-06-11.
- "Murray Chotiner, long-time Nixon political confidant, dies" (PDF). Los Angeles Times. 1974-01-31. Archived from the original (PDF) on October 23, 2012. (subscription required)
- "Chotiner 'great guy', President tells his widow" (PDF). Los Angeles Times. 1974-02-05. Archived from the original (PDF) on October 23, 2012. (subscription required)

The New York Times

- Trussell, C.P. (1956-05-03). "Nixon aide in '52 denies trying to sway contracts". The New York Times. (subscription required)
- "Lone wolf of politics". The New York Times. 1956-05-04. (subscription required)
- "G.O.P. won't use Chotiner in race". The New York Times. 1956-06-03. (subscription required)
- "Unit says Chotiner wrote to President". The New York Times. 1956-06-07. (subscription required)
- "Chotiner hearing put off". The New York Times. 1956-09-23. (subscription required)
- Trussell, C.P. (1957-09-26). "Senators score uniform makers". The New York Times. (subscription required)
- Walz, Jay (1958-02-18). "Schwartz cites Adams letters on airline case". The New York Times. (subscription required)
- Hill, Gladwyn (1960-03-27). "Chotiner claims backing of Nixon". The New York Times. (subscription required)
- Davies, Lawrence (1960-06-08). "Nixon's backers hail Coast vote". The New York Times. (subscription required)
- Becker, Bill (1962-08-12). "Chotiner to help Nixon's campaign". The New York Times. (subscription required)
- Davies, Lawrence (1962-11-08). "Brown expects Nixon to remain in political life". The New York Times. (subscription required)
- "Lawyer pleads not guilty of plot to kill Chotiner". The New York Times. 1966-01-20. (subscription required)
- "California land developer sentenced in Chotiner case". The New York Times. 1966-05-13. (subscription required)
- Dale, Erwin (1969-04-11). "Gilette executive given trade post". The New York Times. (subscription required)
- "Nixon signed order on job Chotiner got". The New York Times. 1969-04-12. (subscription required)
- Semple, Robert (1970-01-14). "Chotiner named to Nixon's staff". The New York Times. (subscription required)
- Apple, R.W. (1970-04-06). "Nixon guides Republicans on Senate races". The New York Times. (subscription required)
- "Chotiner, long a Nixon aide, cautious on G.O.P. prospects". The New York Times. 1970-06-11. (subscription required)
- Madden, Richard L. (1970-10-12). "A Nixon lieutenant since 1946: Murray M (for 'absolutely nothing') Chotiner". The New York Times. (subscription required)
- "30-year mark ended by victory of Buckley". The New York Times. 1970-11-04. (subscription required)
- "Chotiner resigns post at White House". The New York Times. 1971-03-05. (subscription required)
- "Chotiner concedes interceding with Haldeman on Hoffa parole". The New York Times. 1973-05-04. (subscription required)
- "G.A.O. sees election law violations by Nixon unit". The New York Times. 1973-12-19. (subscription required)
- "Paper retracts article linking Chotiner to Watergate". The New York Times. 1974-01-01. (subscription required)
- Lydon, Christopher (1974-01-31). "Murray Chotiner, Nixon mentor dies". The New York Times. (subscription required)
- "The year no one became president". The New York Times. 1992-02-22. (subscription required) Article mentions through 1988, mentions the Bush/Buchanan race. Common knowledge that Bush lost to Clinton and that neither Clinton or George W. Bush faced a significant primary challenge.

The Washington Post

- Cannon, Lou (1974-01-31). "Murray Chotiner, close friend of Nixon" (PDF). The Washington Post. Archived from the original (PDF) on October 23, 2012. (subscription required)
- Feever, Douglas (1974-01-31). "Chotiner dies of car accident injuries". The Washington Post. (subscription required)
- Bright-Sagnier, Barbara (1974-02-05). "Chotiner eulogized as 'gifted lawyer'" (PDF). The Washington Post. Archived from the original (PDF) on October 23, 2012. (subscription required)
- "Goldberg a veteran at recording gossip". The Washington Post. 1998-02-04. (subscription required)

Other papers

- Becker, Bill (1956-05-16). "Chotiner becomes national figure". The Evening Outlook. Santa Monica, CA. p. 3.
- "Mother and daughter, 15, slain in lawyer's office". Los Angeles Daily Mirror, repeated in Los Angeles Times news blog. 1957-07-19.
- Walters, Robert (1970-03-15). "Campaigner Chotiner back". The Washington Star.

Journals

- Bonafede, Dan (1970-05-30). "Men behind Nixon/Murray Chotiner: early tutor, political counselor". National Journal. 2.
- "The friend from California". Time. 1956-05-14. Archived from the original on January 16, 2005.

Online sources

- Fry, Amelia (1980). "Richard M. Nixon in the Warren era: Amelia Fry interviews John Dinkelspiel, Frank Jorgensen and Roy Day". Earl Warren Oral History Project. p. 534.
- "Smith, Howard K." The Museum of Broadcast Communications. Archived from the original on 2009-02-17.
