= William Chapman Foster =

American diplomat

William Foster
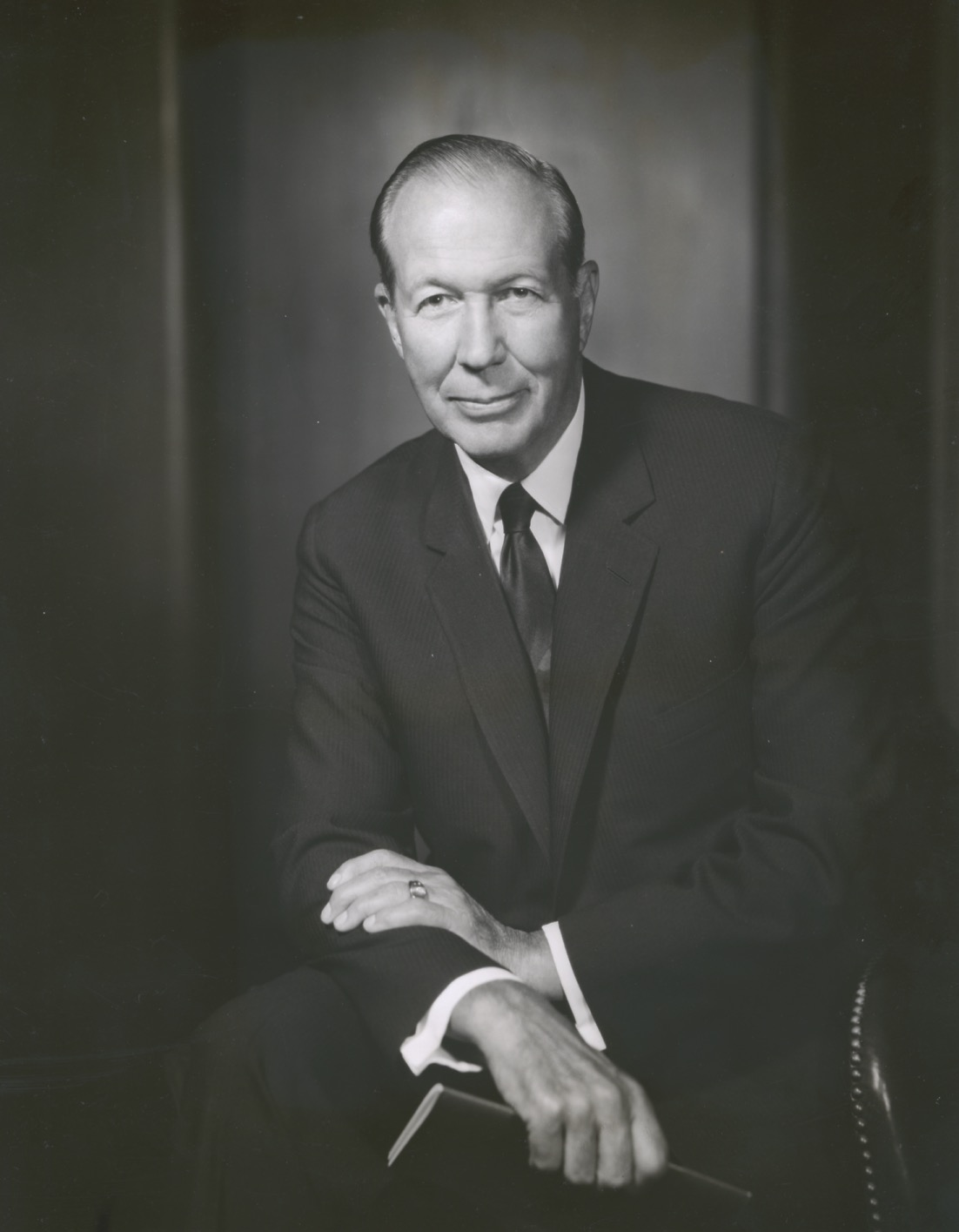

1st Director of the Arms Control and Disarmament Agency
- In office October 6, 1961 – December 31, 1968
- President: John F. Kennedy; Lyndon B. Johnson
- Preceded by: John J. McCloy (Director of the Disarmament Administration)
- Succeeded by: Gerard C. Smith

3rd United States Deputy Secretary of Defense
- In office September 24, 1951 – January 20, 1953
- President: Harry S. Truman
- Preceded by: Robert A. Lovett
- Succeeded by: Roger M. Kyes

Administrator of the Economic Cooperation Administration
- In office October 2, 1950 – September 12, 1951
- President: Harry S. Truman
- Preceded by: Paul G. Hoffman
- Succeeded by: Averell Harriman (Mutual Security Agency)

United States Under Secretary of Commerce
- In office 1946–1948
- President: Harry S. Truman
- Preceded by: Alfred Schindler
- Succeeded by: Charles W. Sawyer

Personal details
- Born: William Chapman Foster; April 27, 1897 Westfield, New Jersey, U.S.
- Died: October 15, 1984 (aged 87) Washington, D.C., U.S.
- Party: Republican
- Education: Massachusetts Institute of Technology (attended)

William Chapman Foster (April 27, 1897 – October 15, 1984) was an American businessman and high-ranking government official. He served as United States Under Secretary of Commerce and United States Deputy Secretary of Defense under President Harry Truman. Later, he served as the first United States Arms Control and Disarmament Agency director, under Presidents John F. Kennedy and Lyndon B. Johnson.

== Early life and career ==
Born in Westfield, New Jersey in 1897, Foster attended the Massachusetts Institute of Technology (MIT), studying chemical engineering. While a senior at MIT, he enlisted in what was then known as the United States Army Air Service and served as a combat pilot in World War I.He told a story of how he got his pilots license when there were no instructors. He was a sailor, so he knew the wind upon a sail. An airplane was similar, he said, with the sail horizontal. The first requirement was that you had to obtain an airplane. Then as long as you took off and landed without dying, you were awarded a license. VJF reference. In 1918, he entered the workforce as an engineer for various organizations including the Packard Motor Car Company. In 1922, he went into business for himself as the owner of the Pressed & Welded Steel Products Company.

== Early government career ==
Following a successful business career, Foster worked closely with the U.S. government during World War II, serving on the New York City mayors' post-war planning committee and as a member of the Purchase Policy Advisory Committee of the Army Services Forces. In 1944, he took office as Deputy Director of the Purchases Division, Army Service Forces.

In 1946, Averell Harriman, then Secretary of Commerce, picked Foster to be Under Secretary of Commerce, in part to help with rebuilding Europe after the war. When President Harry Truman launched the Marshall Plan for that purpose in 1948, Harriman became the Special Representative of the effort in Europe and Foster became his deputy. Foster was Administrator of the Marshall Plan (formally the Economic Cooperation Administration) for 1950–1951.

In 1951, as the Korean War raged, Truman appointed Foster to be Deputy Secretary of Defense, under Secretary Robert A. Lovett. Foster played a major role in organizing the Defense Department's procurement for the war.

== 1950s private sector career ==
Although Foster was a lifelong Republican, he left government when the Eisenhower administration came to office. In 1953, upon deciding to leave his role in the government, Foster accepted the position of President of the prestigious Manufacturing Chemists Association (MCA). During his time there, he proposed a national-level air pollution abatement committee, which eventually led to offices within the government prior to the creation of the Environmental Protection Agency. Foster had long-been a free trade advocate, and eventually left the MCA over its support of tariffs. He served as Executive Vice President and Director of Olin Mathieson Chemical Corporation until 1958, and as Vice President and Senior Advisor of Olin Mathieson until 1961.

== Return to public service ==
In 1961, Foster worked with the Kennedy administration to pass a law creating a new Arms Control and Disarmament Agency, and served as its founding director (1961–1968). Foster not only directed the agency, but also served as one of the key U.S. arms control negotiators. Having established a good working relationship with his Soviet counterparts, he contributed to the Nuclear Test Ban Treaty and the hot-line accord in 1963 and was the lead U.S. negotiator for the 1968 Treaty on the Non-Proliferation of Nuclear Weapons, frequently serving as the U.S. representative to the Eighteen Nation Committee on Disarmament (ENCD). The ACDA under Foster's leadership is widely seen as having been the driving force behind a wide range of disarmament and nonproliferation efforts. Foster left the government again at the end of the Johnson administration.

== Later private sector career ==
On leaving the government, Foster was convinced that the public and the foreign policy elite outside government needed to have a voice in arms control and nonproliferation issues, and worked with others to found the non-government Arms Control Association serving as its founding chairman. He also served on the boards of the Johns Hopkins School of Advanced International Studies and the George C. Marshall Foundation. He died in 1984.

Political offices
Preceded by Alfred Schindler	United States Under Secretary of Commerce; 1946–1948	Succeeded by Charles W. Sawyer
Preceded by Robert A. Lovett	United States Deputy Secretary of Defense; 1951–1953	Succeeded by Roger M. Kyes
Diplomatic posts
Preceded by Paul G. Hoffman	Administrator of the Economic Cooperation Administration; 1950–1951	Succeeded by Averell Harriman as Director of the Mutual Security Agency
Preceded by John J. McCloy as Director of the Disarmament Administration	Director of the Arms Control and Disarmament Agency; 1961–1968	Succeeded by Gerard C. Smith
