= Loyd Wright =

American lawyer

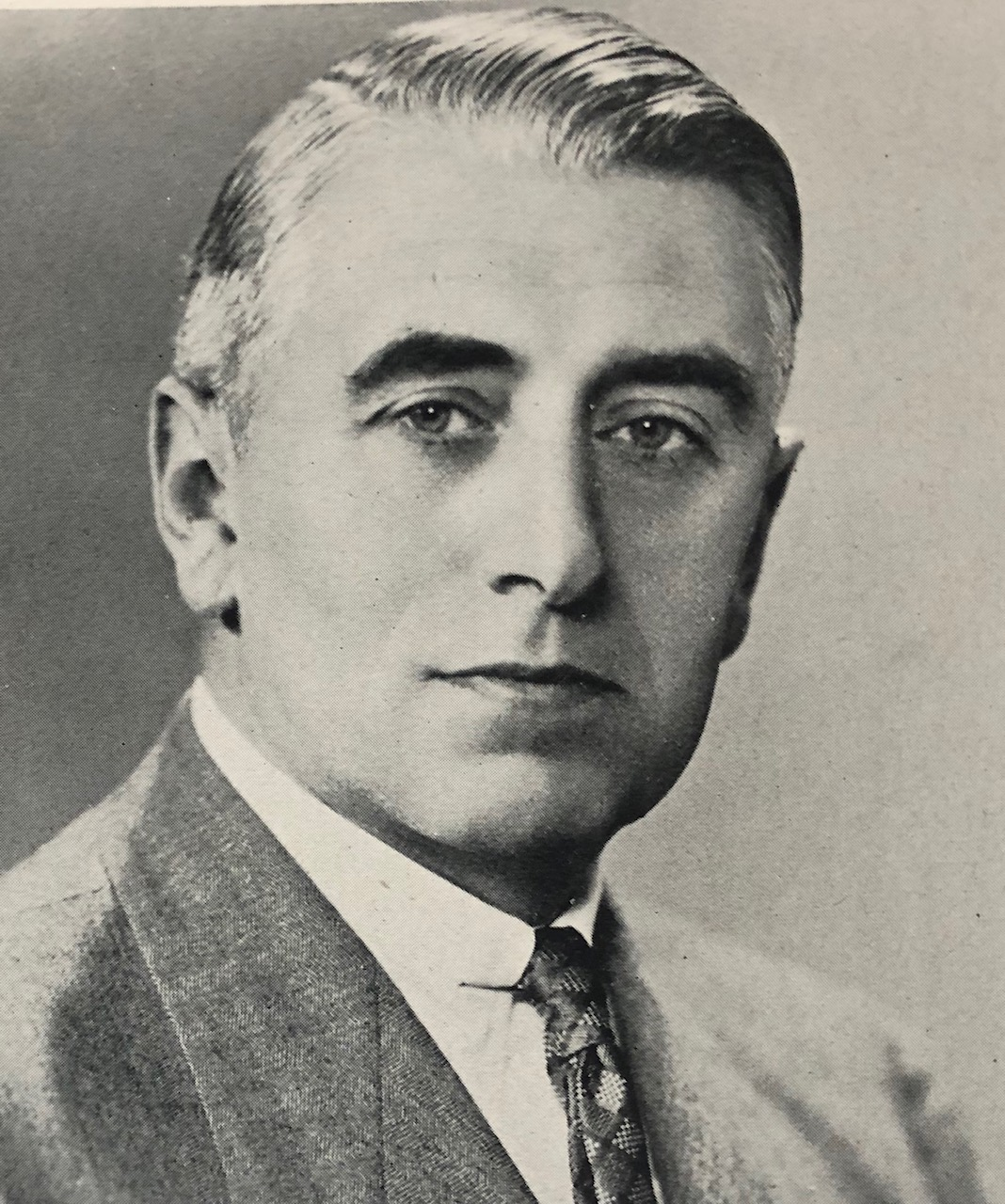
- Born: December 24, 1892; San Jacinto, California, U.S.
- Died: October 22, 1974 (aged 81)
- Occupation: Lawyer

Loyd Wright (December 24, 1892 – October 22, 1974) was an American attorney and lifetime Californian, who represented a number of movie stars, served as president of the State Bar of California, the American Bar Association, the Los Angeles County Bar Association, and the International Bar Association and was an unsuccessful candidate for the Republican nomination for the United States Senate from California.

== Early life and legal career ==
Wright was born in San Jacinto, California on December 24, 1892. He attended the University of Southern California and secured a Bachelor of Laws degree from its law school in 1915. He began the practice of law, which he would remain in for fifty-five years, in Los Angeles.

Wright became known for his representation of movie actors. He represented Mary Pickford in her divorce suit against Douglas Fairbanks Sr. He also represented Shirley Temple, Charlie Chaplin, Jack Benny, Mae West and D.W. Griffith. From 1921 to 1936, Wright lectured at U.S.C.'s law school.

== Bar officer and commission member ==
Wright interested himself in bar affairs, and in 1937 became president of the Los Angeles Bar Association, in which capacity he served for a year. In 1940, he served a year as president of the State Bar of California, and in 1955, served a year as president of the American Bar Association. Wright continued the practice of law, representing Jane Wyman in her divorce suit against Ronald Reagan, though Wyman asked Wright to accept $5,000 in settlement of his $7,500 bill.

During World War II, Wright attended the Command and General Staff School at Fort Leavenworth, Kansas, and then was appointed by the Justice Department as a member of the Board of Appeals in enemy alien hearings.

In 1955, Wright was asked by his friend, Vice President Richard Nixon, to serve as a chairman of the Commission on Government Security. He did, and the Committee recommended a thorough overhaul of government defenses against subversion. Wright served for ten years from 1954 as president of the International Bar Association.

== Political run and later life ==
In 1962, Wright hired Murray Chotiner as his campaign manager and ran for the Republican U.S. Senate nomination, but was handily defeated by incumbent Thomas H. Kuchel.

On October 22, 1974, Wright died in Hemet, California.
