= Notable American Women, 1607–1950 =

Reference work published in 1971

Notable American Women, 1607–1950: A Biographical Dictionary is a three-volume biographical dictionary published in 1971. Its origins lay in 1957 when Radcliffe College librarians, archivists, and professors began researching the need for a version of the Dictionary of American Biography dedicated solely to women.

== Significance ==
Notable American Women was the first major modern reference book of women's biographies, although the genre was common in earlier eras, such as the 1804 A Biographical Dictionary of the Celebrated Women Of Every Age and Country by Matilda Betham. It appeared when Women's studies in U.S. universities had created great interest in understanding women's past. Upon its publication it was viewed by scholars as a magnificent contribution to understanding the role of women in U.S. history.

Writing of the changes in perspective on biography inspired by Notable American Women, 1607–1950 Susan Ware observed, "1,359 entries showed the range and depth of women’s contributions to American life, a pointed correction to women’s near-total exclusion from existing biographical dictionaries at the time and a dramatic spur to further research."

== Updates ==
Notable American Women: The Modern Period : a Biographical Dictionary updated the set for subjects who died between 1951 and 1976. The work for the fourth volume was a joint project of Radcliffe College and Harvard University Press funded by the National Endowment for the Humanities, and edited by Barbara Sicherman and Carol Hurd Green.

In 2004 volume 5 was issued: Notable American Women: A Biographical Dictionary Completing the Twentieth Century. The fifth volume in the series and was edited by historian Susan Ware who was assisted by Stacy Braukman. The women who were included had to have died prior to 2000. The volume differed from its predecessors because first ladies were not automatically included. Fame was not a factor, rather those chosen for inclusion had to have been influential or have contributed innovations or pioneering work in their area of expertise in their era.

== Reception ==
A 1973 review of Notable American Women, 1607-1950 by Mary Elizabeth Massey in The American Historical Review describes the work as "the most scholarly of all female reference works yet published", and notes, "As might be expected in a work of this kind, special attention is given to political activists, feminists, and suffragists, but the opponents of feminism and woman suffrage have not been ignored." In a 1973 review for The William and Mary Quarterly, Barbara Welter writes, "Although white middle-class women who were reformers and authors predominate, women of other ethnic groups, holding diverse occupations, also appear. The sources consulted for even the most obscure of the lives are impressive - manuscripts, archives, collateral accounts, as well as exhaustive secondary material."

According to Marjorie F. Gutheim in a review for New England Quarterly, "There is someone here to interest everyone. If the longest articles seem a bit overpowering, or the more familiar ones too well known, turn to Mary Peck Butterworth, counterfeiter of colonial days; Margaret Hardenbrook Philipse, who carried on a mercantile business in her maiden name [...]; Kate Kennedy, who in the late 1860's fought for "equal pay for equal work"; Ellen Demorest who developed paper dress patterns; Alice Kober who helped decipher Linear B; Ida Lewis, a lighthouse keeper renowned for her rescues; Annie Peck, the mountain climber; Ann Eliza Young, a disaffected wife of Brigham Young; Emma Edmonds who served for two years in the Army of the Potomac disguised as a man."

In a review of the fifth volume, Notable American Women: A Biographical Dictionary Completing The Twentieth Century, P. Palmer writes for Choice Reviews, "The entries emphasize achievement rather than fame. Ware selected knowledgeable authors to write the alphabetically arranged, signed entries; e.g., Ruth Bader Ginsburg writes about Burnita Shelton Matthews, the Mississippi native who was the first woman to become a lifetenured federal trial court judge. Throughout the work, writing is balanced and detailed." A review in The Journal of Blacks in Higher Education states "Often historical compendiums assembled by white historians and editors tend to shortchange the contributions of members of minority groups. But this is not the case in the publication of Notable American Women", and 69 of the 442 biographies in the fifth volume are Black women, including "Black women from the fields of art, literature, sports, music, government, and entertainment", as well as "some of the most notable black women educators of the period". In a review for Feminist Collections, Mary Hitchcock writes, "One potential drawback to the structure of the books in this series is that without a comprehensive index to all the volumes, it could prove time-consuming to locate an entry for a particular woman if one is not certain when she died. Overall, however, the series and this volume in particular are very valuable resources, providing useful information about women whose lives might be glossed over or ignored completely by more general biographical dictionaries."

== Women included in Volumes 1-3 ==
=== Abolitionists ===
- Mary Ann Shadd Cary
- Elizabeth Buffum Chace
- Elizabeth Margaret Chandler
- Maria Weston Chapman
- Lydia Maria Francis Child
- Betsey Mix Cowles
- Ellen Craft
- Prudence Crandall
- Sarah Mapps Douglass Douglass
- Eliza Lee Cabot Follen
- Abigail Kelley Foster
- Frances Dana Barker Gage
- Abigail Hopper Gibbons
- Mary Grew
- Josephine Sophia White Griffing
- Angelina Emily Grimke
- Charlotte L. Forten Grimke
- Sarah Moore Grimke
- Laura Smith Haviland
- Sallie Holley
- Emily Howland
- Abigail Jemima Hutchinson
- Jane Elizabeth Hitchcock Jones
- Lucretia Coffin Mott
- Sarah Pugh
- Sarah Parker Remond
- Lucy Stone
- Sojourner Truth
- Harriet Tubman
- Frances Wright

=== Actresses and Theatre Managers ===
- Viola Emily Allen
- Mary Anderson
- Julia Arthur
- Georgiana Emma Drew Barrymore
- Kate Josephine Bateman
- Blanche Lyon Bates
- Nora Bayes
- Jessie Bonstelle
- Agnes Booth
- Alice Brady
- Marie Cahill
- Caroline Louise Dudley Carter
- Georgia Eva Cayvan
- Caroline Chapman
- Ada Clare
- Marguerite Clark
- Kate Claxton
- Maggie Cline
- Rose Coghlan
- Jane Cowl
- Lotta Crabtree
- Laura Hope Crews
- Henrietta Foster Crosman
- Charlotte Saunders Cushman
- Fanny Lily Gypsy Davenport
- Julia Dean
- Elsie De Wolfe
- Frances Ann Denny Drake
- Marie Dressler
- Louisa Lane Drew
- Mary Ann Dyke Duff
- Jeanne Eagels
- Gertrude Elliott
- Maxine Elliott
- Effie Ellsler
- Rose Eytinge
- Clara Fisher
- Minnie Maddern Fiske
- Malvina Pray Florence
- Catherine Norton Sinclair Forrest
- Della Fox
- Pauline Frederick
- Anne Jane Hartley Gilbert
- Mary Louise Cecilia Guinan
- Mrs. Lewis Hallam
- Anna Held
- Chrystal Katharine Herne
- Matilda Agnes Heron
- Caroline Emily Fox Howard
- Cordelia Howard
- May Irwin
- Francesca Romana Magdalena Janauschek
- Bertha Kalich
- Laura Keene
- Frances Anne Kemble
- Cissie Loftus
- Olive Logan
- Pauline Lord
- Rose McClendon
- Julia Marlowe
- Adah Isaacs Menken
- Ann Brunton Merry
- Marilyn Miller
- Florence Mills
- Maggie Mitchell
- Helena Modjeska
- Lola Montez
- Helen Morgan
- Clara Morris
- Anna Cora Ogden Mowatt
- Alla Nazimova
- Antoinette Perry
- Adelaide Phillipps
- Elizabeth Arnold Hopkins Poe
- Ada Rehan
- Catherine Mary Reignolds
- Agnes Kelly Robertson
- May Robson
- Susanna Haswell Rowson
- Annie Russell
- Lillian Russell
- Mary G. Shaw
- Eva Tanguay
- Laurette Taylor
- Fay Templeton
- Blanche Oelrichs Thomas Barrymore Tweed
- Priscilla Cooper Tyler
- Mary Ann Farlow Vincent
- Helen Westley
- Blanche Galton Whiffen
- Matilda Charlotte Vining Wood

=== Anthropologists and Folklorists ===
- Ruth Fulton Benedict
- Harriet Maxwell Converse
- Natalie Curtis
- Fannie Pearson Hardy Eckstorm
- Alice Cunningham Fletcher
- Lucy McKim Garrison
- Annie Aubertine Woodward Moore
- Zelia Maria Magdalena Nuttall
- Elsie Clews Parsons
- Erminnie Adele Platt Smith
- Matilda Coxe Evans Stevenson

=== Architects and Interior Decorators ===
- Louise Blanchard Bethune
- Elsie De Wolfe
- Louise Caldwell Murdock
- Minerva Parker Nichols
- Edith Newbold Jones Wharton
- Candace Thurber Wheeler

=== Art Collectors and Patrons ===
- Lizzie Plummer Bliss
- Claribel Cone
- Etta Cone
- Anna Charlotte Rice Cooke
- Anne Evans (arts patron)
- Juliana Rieser Force
- Isabella Stewart Gardner
- Belle da Costa Greene
- Louisine Waldron Elder Havemeyer
- Louise Caldwell Murdock
- Bertha Honore Palmer
- Abby Greene Aldrich Rockefeller
- Grace Rainey Rogers
- Gertrude Stein
- Mary Josephine Quinn Sullivan
- Gertrude Vanderbilt Whitney
- Catharine Lorillard Wolfe

=== Art Critics and Historians ===
- Elisabeth Luther Cary
- Helen Gardner (art historian)
- Leila Mechlin
- Elizabeth Robins Pennell
- Mariana Alley Griswold Van Rensselaer
- Clara Erskine Clement Waters

=== Art Educators ===
- Alice Van Vechten Brown
- Florence Nightingale Levy
- Mary Amelia Dana Hicks Prang
- Emily Sartain
- Eliza Allen Starr
- Irene Weir

=== Astronomers ===
- Annie Jump Cannon
- Williamina Paton Stevens Fleming
- Henrietta Swan Leavitt
- Maria Mitchell
- Sarah Frances Whiting
- Mary Watson Whitney

=== Authors (by literary period) ===
==== 1607-1820 ====
- Ann Eliza Bleecker
- Anne Bradstreet
- Elizabeth Graeme Ferguson
- Hannah Webster Foster
- Sarah Wentworth Apthorp Morton
- Judith Sargent Murray
- Susanna Haswell Rowson
- Tabitha Gilman Tenney
- Jane Colman Turell
- Mercy Otis Warren
- Phillis Wheatley
- Sally Sayward Barrell Keating Wood

==== 1821-1860 ====
- Delia Salter Bacon
- Anne Charlotte Lynch Botta
- Maria Gowen Brooks
- Alice Cary
- Phoebe Cary
- Lydia Maria Francis Child
- Louise Amelia Knapp Smith Clapp
- Ada Clare
- Susan Augusta Fenimore Cooper
- Fanny Crosby
- Maria Susanna Cummins
- Lucretia Maria Davidson
- Margaret Miller Davidson
- Mary Henderson Eastman
- Elizabeth Fries Lummis Ellet
- Harriet Farley
- Eliza Ware Rotch Farrar
- Margaret Fuller
- Caroline Howard Gilman
- Sarah Josepha Buell Hale
- Frances Ellen Watkins Harper
- Emily Bradley Neal Haven
- Caroline Lee Whiting Hentz
- Ellen Sturgis Hooper
- Julia Ward Howe
- Emily Chubbuck Judson
- Juliette Augusta Magill Kinzie
- Caroline Matilda Stansbury Kirkland
- Eliza Leslie
- Octavia Celeste Walton Le Vert
- Sara Jane Clarke Lippincott
- Maria White Lowell
- Louisa Susannah Cheves McCord
- Maria Jane McIntosh
- Penina Moïse
- Anna Cora Ogden Mowatt
- Frances Sargent Locke Osgood
- Sara Payson Willis Parton
- Elizabeth Palmer Peabody
- Mary Hayden Green Pike
- Elizabeth Payson Prentiss
- Sophia Willard Dana Ripley
- Mary Anne Madden Sadlier
- Caroline Mehitable Fisher Sawyer
- Catharine Maria Sedgwick
- Lydia Howard Huntley Sigoumey
- Elizabeth Oakes Prince Smith
- Margaret Bayard Smith
- Emma Dorothy Eliza Nevitte Southworth
- Ann Sophia Stephens
- Harriet Beecher Stowe
- Caroline Sturgis Tappan
- Eliza L. Sproat Randolph Turner
- Louisa Caroline Huggins Tuthill
- Frances Auretta Fuller Victor
- Metta Victoria Fuller Victor
- Susan Bogert Warner
- Anna Bartlett Warner
- Frances Miriam Berry Whitcher
- Sarah Helen Power Whitman
- Augusta Jane Evans Wilson

==== 1861-1900 ====
- Elizabeth Anne Chase Akers Allen
- Eliza Frances Andrews
- Alice Mabel Bacon
- Amelia Edith Huddleston Barr
- Sarah Tittle Barrett Bolton
- Alice Brown (writer) - 1856-1948
- Mary Edwards Bryan
- Mary Hartwell Catherwood
- Ednah Dow Littlehale Cheney
- Kate O'Flaherty Chopin
- Mary Bayard Devereux Clarke
- Rose Terry Cooke
- Ina Donna Coolbrith
- Fanny Crosby
- Mollie Evelyn Moore Davis
- Rebecca Blaine Harding Davis
- Margaret Deland
- Mary Ann Andrews Denison
- Abby Morton Diaz
- Emily Dickinson
- Mary Abigail Dodge
- Sarah Anne Ellis Dorsey
- Eliza Ann Dupuy
- Maud Howe Elliott
- Sarah Barnwell Elliott
- Annie Adams Fields
- Mary Anna Hallock Foote
- Mary Eleanor Wilkins Freeman
- Alice French
- Jeannette Leonard Gilder
- Anna Katharine Green
- Sarah Pratt McLean Greene
- Louise Imogen Guiney
- Lucretia Peabody Hale
- Susan Hale
- Phebe Ann Coffin Hanaford
- Frances Ellen Watkins Harper
- Constance Cary Harrison
- Marietta Holley
- Mary Jane Hawes Holmes
- Blanche Willis Howard
- Helen Maria Fiske Hunt Jackson
- Alice James
- Sarah Orne Jewett
- Grace Elizabeth King
- Lucy Larcom
- Emma Lazarus
- Laura Jean Libbey
- Josephine Woempner Clifford McCrackin
- Katharine Sherwood Bonner McDowell
- Julia Magruder
- Emily Clark Huntington Miller
- Annie Aubertine Woodward Moore
- Clara Sophia Jessup Moore
- Louise Chandler Moulton
- Mary Noailles Murfree
- Alice Dunbar Nelson
- Elizabeth Robins Pennell
- Sarah Morgan Bryan Piatt
- Elizabeth Payson Prentiss
- Margaret Junkin Preston
- Lizette Woodworth Reese
- Amélie Louise Rives
- Mary Anne Madden Sadlier
- Katharine Margaret Brownlee Sherwood
- Mary Elizabeth Wilson Sherwood
- Hannah Whitall Smith
- Emma Dorothy Eliza Nevitte Southworth
- Cornelia Ann Phillips Spencer
- Harriet Elizabeth Prescott Spofford
- Harriet Beecher Stowe
- Ruth McEnery Stuart
- Mary Virginia Hawes Terhune
- Celia Laighton Thaxter
- Edith Matilda Thomas
- Rose Alnora Hartwick Thorpe
- Frances Christine Fisher Tiernan
- Mabel Loomis Todd
- Metta Victoria Fuller Victor
- Elizabeth Stuart Phelps Ward
- Lilian Whiting
- Adeline Dutton Train Whitney
- Kate Douglas Smith Wiggin
- Ella Wheeler Wilcox
- Augusta Jane Evans Wilson
- Julia Amanda Sargent Wood
- Katharine Pearson Woods
- Sarah Chauncey Woolsey
- Constance Fenimore Woolson

==== 1900-1950 ====
- Mary Raymond Shipman Andrews
- Mary Antin
- Gertrude Franklin Horn Atherton
- Mary Hunter Austin
- Katharine Lee Bates
- Anna Hempstead Branch
- Alice Van Vechten Brown
- Willa Sibert Cather
- Helen Archibald Clarke
- Florence Van Leer Earle Nicholson Coates
- Adelaide Crapsey
- Maud Howe Elliott
- Rachel Lyman Field
- Mary Parker Follett
- Zona Gale
- Katharine Elizabeth Fullerton Gerould
- Jeannette Leonard Gilder
- Ellen Anderson Gholson Glasgow
- Susan Keating Glaspell
- Corra May White Harris
- Grace Livingston Hill
- Mary Johnston
- Amy Lowell
- Jean Kenyon Mackenzie
- George Madden Martin
- Katherine Mayo
- Edna St. Vincent Millay
- Alice Duer Miller
- Margaret Munnerlyn Mitchell
- Harriet Monroe
- Alice Dunbar Nelson
- Frances Newman
- Rose Cecil O'Neill
- Josephine Preston Peabody
- Charlotte Endymion Porter
- Sara Agnes Rice Pryor
- Emily James Smith Putnam
- Myrtle Reed
- Lizette Woodworth Reese
- Agnes Repplier
- Alice Caldwell Hegan Rice
- Edith Rickert
- Lola Ridge
- Jessie Bell Rittenhouse
- Amelie Louise Rives
- Elizabeth Madox Roberts
- Constance Mayfield Rourke
- Jessie Ethel Sampter
- Anne Douglas Sedgwick
- Constance Lindsay Skinner
- Gertrude Stein
- Kate Stephens
- Gene Stratton-Porter
- Genevieve Taggard
- Ida Minerva Tarbell
- Sara Teasdale
- Edith Matilda Thomas
- Eunice Tietjens
- Kate Nichols Trask
- Blanche Oelrichs Thomas Barrymore Tweed
- Marie Louise Van Vorst
- Jean Webster
- Carolyn Wells
- Edith Newbold Jones Wharton
- Kate Douglas Smith Wiggin
- Nancy Mann Waddel Woodrow
- Mabel Osgood Wright
- Elinor Morton Hoyt Wylie

=== Biologists ===
- Cornelia Maria Clapp
- Rosa Smith Eigenmann
- Ida Henrietta Hyde
- Mary J. Rathbun
- Nettie Maria Stevens

=== Botanists and Horticulturists ===
- Eliza Frances Andrews
- Rachel Littler Bodley
- Mary Katharine Layne Curran Brandegee
- Elizabeth Gertrude Knight Britton
- Jane Colden
- Kate Furbish
- Louisa Boyd Yeomans King
- Martha Daniell Logan
- Ynes Enriquetta Julietta Mexia
- Almira Hart Lincoln Phelps
- Elizabeth Lucas Pinckney
- Elizabeth Waties Allston Pringle
- Kate Olivia Sessions
- Lydia White Shattuck
- Harriet Williams Russell Strong
- Anna Bartlett Warner

=== Chemists and Physicists ===
- Rachel Littler Bodley
- Dorothy Anna Hahn
- Margaret Eliza Maltby
- Ellen Henrietta Swallow Richards
- Sarah Frances Whiting

=== Children's Authors ===
- Louisa May Alcott
- Isabella Macdonald Alden
- Jane Andrews
- Margery Williams Bianco
- Abbie Farwell Brown
- Frances Eliza Hodgson Burnett
- Rebecca Sophia Clarke
- Mary Elizabeth Mapes Dodge
- Rachel Lyman Field
- Martha Finley
- Eliza Lee Cabot Follen
- Wanda Hazel Gág
- Lucretia Peabody Hale
- Annie Fellows Johnston
- Eliza Leslie
- Harriett Mulford Stone Lothrop
- Emily Clark Huntington Miller
- Olive Thome Miller
- Lucy Fitch Perkins
- Eleanor Hodgman Porter
- Elizabeth Payson Prentiss
- Alice Caldwell Hegan Rice
- Laura Elizabeth Howe Richards
- Eva March Tappan
- Eliza Orne White
- Kate Douglas Smith Wiggin
- Sarah Chauncey Woolsey

=== Circus Performers ===
- Lillian Leitzel
- Annie Oakley
- Mercy Lavinia Warren Bump Stratton

=== Civil War Figures ===
- Eliza Frances Andrews
- Clara Barton
- Mary Ann Ball Bickerdyke
- Belle Boyd
- Amy Morris Bradley
- Cloe Annette Buckel
- Anna Ella Carroll
- Mary Boykin Miller Chesnut
- Virginia Caroline Tunstall Clay-Clopton
- Ellen Collins (1828–1912)
- Elizabeth Leslie Rous Comstock
- Kate Cumming
- Varina Anne Howell Davis
- Anna Elizabeth Dickinson
- Dorothea Lynde Dix
- Sarah Emma Evelyn Edmonds
- Elida Barker Rumsey Fowle
- Barbara Hauer Frietschie
- Frances Dana Barker Gage
- Abigail Hopper Gibbons
- Mother Angela Gillespie
- Helen Louise Gilson
- Rose O'Neal Greenhow
- Charlotte L. Forten Grimke
- Cornelia Hancock
- Jane Currie Blaikie Hoge
- Juliet Ann Opie Hopkins
- Mary Ashton Rice Livermore
- Louisa Susannah Cheves McCord
- Abigail Williams May Abby W. May 1829-1888
- Sister Anthony O'Connell
- Emily Elizabeth Parsons
- Phoebe Yates Levy Pember
- Lucy Petway Holcombe Pickens
- Eliza Emily Chappell Porter
- Sarah Agnes Rice Pryor
- Mary Jane Safford
- Martha Schofield
- Louisa Lee Schuyler
- Mary Eugenia Jenkins Surratt
- Sally Louisa Tompkins
- Laura Matilda Towne
- Ella King Newsom Trader
- Harriet Tubman
- Adeline Blanchard Tyler
- Elizabeth L. Van Lew
- Mary Edwards Walker
- Annie Turner Wittenmyer
- Abby Howland Woolsey
- Georgeanna Woolsey
- Jane Stuart Woolsey
- Katharine Prescott Wormeley

=== Classicists ===
- Edith Hayward Hall Dohan
- Harriet Ann Boyd Hawes
- Lida Shaw King
- Alice Elizabeth Kober
- Abby Leach
- Grace Harriet Macurdy
- Esther Boise Van Deman
- Helen Magill White

=== College Administrators ===
- Elizabeth Cabot Cary Agassiz
- Mother Marie Joseph Butler
- Mabel Smith Douglass
- Harriet Wiseman Elliott
- Alice Seymour Browne Frame
- Alice Winfield Gordon Gulick
- Julia Henrietta Gulliver
- Caroline Hazard
- Grace Raymond Hebard
- Agnes Irwin
- Eliza Kellas
- Lida Shaw King
- Sister Julia McGroarty
- Elizabeth Storrs Billings Mead
- Susan Lincoln Tolman Mills
- Mary Kimball Morgan
- Mary Mortimer
- Eliza Maria Mosher
- Alice Elvira Freeman Palmer
- Mary Mills Patrick
- Ellen Fitz Pendleton
- Emily James Smith Putnam
- Aurelia Isabel Henry Reinhardt
- Ellen Clara Sabin
- Lucy Diggs Slowe
- Marion Talbot
- Martha Carey Thomas
- Ella Weed
- Mary Emma Woolley

=== Composers ===
- Amy Marcy Cheney Beach
- Carrie Jacobs Bond

=== Dancers ===
- Marie Bonfanti
- Suzanne Theodore Vaillande Douvillier
- Isadora Duncan
- Loie Fuller
- Mary Ann Lee
- Augusta Maywood
- Giuseppina Morlacchi
- Julia Anne Turnbull

=== Educational Reformers ===
- Catharine Esther Beecher
- Joanna Graham Bethune
- Alice Josephine McLellan Birney
- Elizabeth Avery Colton
- Lucretia Crocker
- Grace Hoadley Dodge
- Lucy Louisa Coues Flower
- Zilpah Polly Grant
- Anna Hallowell
- Orie Latham Hatcher
- Mary Porter Tileston Hemenway
- Elisabeth Antoinette Irwin
- Mary Lyon
- Mary Cooke Branch Munford
- Celestia Susannah Parrish
- Pauline Agassiz Shaw
- Cornelia Ann Phillips Spencer
- Martha Carey Thomas
- Lila Hardaway Meade Valentine
- Emma Hart Willard
- Frances Wright
- Caroline Beaumont Zachry

=== Educators of the Handicapped ===
- Sarah Fuller
- Emma Garrett
- Mary Smith Garrett
- Winifred Holt
- Anne Sullivan Macy
- Harriet Burbank Rogers
- Caroline Ardelia Yale
- Entrepreneurs
- Jane Aitken
- Mary Spratt Provoost Alexander
- Harriet Hubbard Ayer
- Elizabeth Eaton Boit
- Cornelia Smith Bradford
- Margaret Brent
- Ellen Louise Curtis Demorest
- Clara Driscoll
- Elizabeth Haddon Estaugh
- Mary Parker Follett
- Ann Smith Franklin
- Kate Gleason
- Mary Katherine Goddard
- Sarah Updike Goddard
- Anne Catherine Hoof Green
- Hetty Howland Robinson Green
- Margaret Gaffney Haughery
- Rose Markward Knox
- Margaret Getchell LaForge
- Rebecca Webb Pennock Lukens
- Nettie Fowler McCormick
- Elisabeth Marbury
- Lady Deborah Moody
- Eliza Jane Poitevent Holbrook Nicholson
- Anna Sartorius Uhl Ottendorfer
- Eleanor Medill Patterson
- Hannah Jane Patterson
- Mary Singleton Copley Pelham
- Hannah Callowhill Penn
- Elizabeth Peck Perkins
- Margaret Hardenbrook Philipse
- Elizabeth Lucas Pinckney
- Lydia Estes Pinkham
- Elizabeth Waties Allston Pringle
- Mary Foot Seymour
- Abigail Stoneman
- Ann Timothy
- Elizabeth Timothy
- Maria Van Cortlandt Van Rensselaer
- Maggie Lena Walker
- Sarah Breedlove Walker
- Charlotte Fowler Wells

=== Explorers and Travelers ===
- Harriet Chalmers Adams
- Sarah Kemble Knight
- Ynes Enriquetta Julietta Mexia
- Annie Smith Peck
- Anne Newport Royall
- Sarah Eleanor Bayliss Royce
- Fanny Bullock Workman

=== Feminists ===
- Mathilde Franziska Giesler Anneke
- Susan Brownell Anthony
- Alice Stone Blackwell
- Antoinette Louisa Brown Blackwell
- Amelia Jenks Bloomer
- Betsey Mix Cowles
- Hannah Mather Crocker
- Jane Cunningham Croly
- Hannah Maria Conant Tracy Cutler
- Caroline Wells Healey Dall
- Paulina Kellogg Wright Davis
- Abby Morton Diaz
- Rheta Childe Dorr
- Crystal Eastman
- Eliza Wood Burhans Farnham
- Mary Upton Ferrin
- Abigail Kelley Foster
- Margaret Fuller
- Frances Dana Barker Gage
- Helen Hamilton Gardener
- Charlotte Anna Perkins Stetson Gilman
- Emma Goldman
- Angelina Emily Grimke
- Sarah Moore Grimke
- Sarah Josepha Buell Hale
- Phebe Ann Coffin Hanaford
- Lydia Sayer Hasbrouck
- Harriot Kezia Hunt
- Abigail Jemima Hutchinson
- Jane Elizabeth Hitchcock Jones
- Kate Kennedy
- Anne Elizabeth McDowell
- Elizabeth Smith Miller
- Lucretia Coffin Mott
- Judith Sargent Murray
- Clarina Irene Howard Nichols
- Mary Sargeant Neal Gove Nichols
- Bethenia Angelina Owens-Adair
- Elizabeth Parsons Ware Packard
- Elsie Clews Parsons
- Ernestine Louise Siismondi Potowski Rose
- Rosika Schwimmer
- Abby Hadassah Smith
- Elizabeth Oakes Prince Smith
- Julia Evelina Smith
- Anna Garlin Spencer
- Elizabeth Cady Stanton
- Kate Stephens
- Lucy Stone
- Jane Grey Cannon Swisshelm
- Martha Carey Thomas
- Mary Edwards Walker
- Elizabeth Stuart Phelps Ward
- Hortense Sparks Malsch Ward
- Mercy Otis Warren
- Emmeline Blanche Woodward Wells
- Frances Elizabeth Caroline Willard
- Martha Coffin Pelham Wright
- Victoria Claflin Woodhull
- Abba Goold Woolson

=== Film Actresses and Directors ===
- Alice Brady
- Marguerite Clark
- Laura Hope Crews
- Marie Dressler
- Pauline Frederick
- Mary Louise Cecilia Guinan
- Jean Harlow
- Florence Lawrence
- Carole Lombard
- Grace Moore
- Alia Nazimova
- Mabel Ethelreid Normand
- May Robson
- Florence E. Turner
- Lois Weber
- Pearl White

=== Geographer and Geologists ===
- Florence Bascom
- Ellen Churchill Semple

=== Hawaiian Nobility ===
- Bernice Pauahi Bishop
- Emma - Queen Emma of Hawaii
- Kaahumanu
- Kapiʻolani
- Liliuokalani

=== Health Reform Advocates ===
- Sara Josephine Baker
- Emily Perkins Bissell
- Elizabeth Blackwell
- Madeline McDowell Breckinridge
- Caroline Julia Bartlett Crane
- Annie Sturges Daniel
- Katharine Bement Davis
- Paulina Kellogg Wright Davis
- Mary Coffin Ware Dennett
- Dorothea Lynde Dix
- Lydia Folger Fowler
- Love Rosa Hirschmann Gantt
- Harriot Kezia Hunt
- Jane Elizabeth Hitchcock Jones
- Alice Lakey
- Eliza Maria Mosher
- Mary Sargeant Neal Gove Nichols
- Elizabeth Parsons Ware Packard
- Eleanor Clarke Slagle
- Frances Stern
- Lila Hardaway Meade Valentine
- Charlotte Fowler Wells
- Rachelle Slobodinsky Yarros

=== Heroines ===
- Priscilla Alden
- Martha Cannary Burk
- Margaret Cochran Corbin
- Martha Corey
- Virginia Dare
- Lydia Barrington Darragh
- Hannah Duston
- Agnes Surriage Frankland
- Barbara Hauer Frietschie
- Nancy Hart
- Ida Lewis
- Mary Ludwig Hays McCauley
- Jane McCrea
- Rebecca Nurse
- Pocahontas
- Betsy Ross
- Sacajawea
- Deborah Sampson
- Harriet Tubman
- Elizabeth Zane

=== Historians ===
- Annie Heloise Abel
- Hannah Adams
- Mary Downing Sheldon Barnes
- Mary Louise Booth
- Frances Manwaring Caulkins
- Katharine Coman
- Alice Morse Earle
- Elizabeth Fries Lummis Ellet
- Helen Gardner
- Abby Maria Hemenway
- Kate Campbell Hurd-Mead
- Louise Phelps Kellogg
- Juliette Augusta Magill Kinzie
- Martha Joanna Reade Nash Lamb
- Deborah Norris Logan
- Nellie Neilson
- Zelia Maria Magdalena Nuttall
- Lucy Maynard Salmon
- Constance Lindsay Skinner
- Ida Minerva Tarbell
- Mariana Alley Griswold Van Rensselaer
- Frances Auretta Fuller Victor
- Mercy Otis Warren
- Clara Erskine Clement Waters
- Mary Wilhelmine Williams
- Helen Laura Sumner Woodbury

=== Historical Preservationists ===
- Ann Pamela Cunningham
- Clara Driscoll
- Elizebeth Thomas Werlein

=== Home Economists ===
- Helen Woodard Atwater
- Isabel Bevier
- Helen Stuart Campbell
- Juliet Corson
- Fannie Merritt Farmer
- Christine Terhune Herrick
- Emily Huntington
- Lizzie Black Kander
- Mary Johnson Bailey Lincoln
- Abby Lillian Marlatt
- Alice Peloubet Norton
- Maria Parloa
- Mary Randolph Randolph
- Ellen Henrietta Swallow Richards
- Sarah Tyson Heston Rorer
- Mary Davies Swartz Rose
- Frances Stern
- Marion Talbot
- Mary Virginia Hawes Terhune
- Martha Van Rensselaer
- Ruth Wheeler
- Mary Raphael Schenck Woolman

=== Illustrators ===
- Francesca Alexander
- Anna Botsford Comstock
- Mary Anna Hallock Foote
- Wanda Hazel Gag
- Helen Elna Hokinson
- Neysa McMein
- Rose Cecil O'Neill
- May Wilson Preston
- Jessie Willcox Smith
- Alice Barber Stephens

=== Indian Captives ===
- Hannah Duston
- Mary Jemison
- Fanny Wiggins Kelly
- Olive Ann Oatman
- Cynthia Ann Parker
- Mary White Rowlandson
- Frances Slocum

=== Indian Reform Advocates ===
- Mary Lucinda Bonney
- Gertrude Simmons Bonnin
- Harriet Maxwell Converse
- Alice Cunningham Fletcher
- Anna Wilmarth Thompson Ickes
- Helen Maria Fiske Hunt Jackson
- Amelia Stone Quinton
- Alice Mary Robertson
- Elizabeth Elkins Sanders
- Susette La Flesche Tibbles
- Sarah Winnemucca

=== Indian Women ===
- Gertrude Simmons Bonnin
- Mary Brant
- Alice Brown Davis
- Marie Dorion
- Milly Francis
- Roberta Campbell Lawson
- Madame Montour
- Mary Musgrove
- Susan La Flesche Picotte
- Pocahontas
- Sacajawea
- Catherine Tekakwitha
- Susette La Flesche Tibbles
- Nancy Ward
- Sarah Winnemucca

=== Inventors ===
- Amanda Theodosia Jones
- Margaret E. Knight
- Sybilla Masters

=== Kindergartners ===
- Eliza Ann Cooper Blaker
- Susan Elizabeth Blow
- Anna E. Bryan 1858-1901
- Sarah Brown Ingersoll Cooper
- Anna Hallowell
- Elizabeth Harrison
- Patty Smith Hill
- Maria Kraus-Boelte
- Annie Laws 1855-1927
- Mary Tyler Peabody Mann
- Emma Jacobina Christiana Marwedel
- Elizabeth Palmer Peabody
- Alice Harvey Whiting Putnam
- Margarethe Meyer Schurz
- Pauline Agassiz Shaw
- Lucy Wheelock
- Kate Douglas Smith Wiggin

=== Labor Leaders ===
- Sarah G. Bagley
- Leonora Marie Kearney Barry
- Dorothy Jacobs Bellanca
- Jennie Collins
- Margaret Angela Haley
- Mary Harris Jones
- Kate Kennedy
- Agnes Nestor
- Leonora O'Reilly
- Mary Kenney O'Sullivan
- Elizabeth Flynn Rodgers
- Alzina Parsons Stevens
- Maud O'Farrell Swartz
- Augusta Lewis Troup

=== Labor Reformers ===
- Gertrude Barnum
- Katherine Philips Edson
- Elizabeth Glendower Evans
- Mabel Edna Gillespie
- Ellen Martin Henrotin
- Alice Henry
- Anna Wilmarth Thompson Ickes
- Mary Morton Kimball Kehew
- Florence Kelley
- Maria Maud Leonard McCreery
- Mary Eliza McDowell
- Helen Marot
- Margaret Dreier Robins
- Daisy Florence Simms
- Hortense Sparks Malsch Ward
- Emma Carola Woerishoffer
- Maud Younger

=== Lawyers ===
- Ada Matilda Cole Bittenbender
- Inez Milholland Boissevain
- Myra Colby Bradwell
- Phoebe Wilson Couzins
- Clara Shortridge Foltz
- Judith Ellen Horton Foster
- Emma Millinda Gillett
- Laura de Force Gordon
- Carrie Burnham Kilgore
- Belle Case La Follette
- Belva Ann Bennett McNall Lockwood
- Catharine Gouger Waugh McCulloch
- Arabella Mansfield
- Ellen Spencer Mussey
- Charlotte E. Ray
- Marilla Marks Young Ricker
- Marion Marsh Todd
- Catharine Van Valkenburg Waite
- Hortense Sparks Malsch Ward
- Sue Shelton White

=== Lecturers and Orators ===
- Harriet Chalmers Adams
- Delia Salter Bacon
- Maria Louise Baldwin
- Leonora Marie Kearney Barry
- Hallie Quinn Brown
- Mary Fenn Davis
- Paulina Kellogg Wright Davis
- Anna Elizabeth Dickinson
- Annie LePorte Diggs
- Sarah Elizabeth Van De Vort Emery
- Eliza Wood Burhans Farnham
- Kate Field
- Mary Parker Follett
- Abigail Kelley Foster
- Margaret Fuller
- Frances Dana Barker Gage
- Charlotte Anna Perkins Stetson Gilman
- Emma Goldman
- Helen Mar Jackson Gougar
- Frances Ellen Watkins Harper
- Jane Elizabeth Hitchcock Jones
- Mary Elizabeth Clyens Lease
- Sara Jane Clarke Lippincott
- Mary Ashton Rice Livermore
- Olive Logan
- Anna Morgan
- Angelia Louise French Thurston Newman
- Annie Smith Peck
- Ernestine Louise Siismondi Potowski Rose
- Maria Louise Sanford
- Anna Howard Shaw
- Elizabeth Oakes Prince Smith
- Anna Carpenter Garlin Spencer
- Elizabeth Cady Stanton
- Eliza Allen Starr
- Lutie Eugenia Stearns
- Maria W. Miller Stewart
- Ida Minerva Tarbell
- Marion Marsh Todd
- Ida Bell Wells-Barnett
- Fannie Barrier Williams
- Frances Wright
- Ann Eliza Webb Young

=== Librarians ===
- Mary Eileen Ahern
- Sarah Byrd Askew
- Sarah Comly Norris Bogle
- Mary Salome Cutler Fairchild
- Jennie Maas Flexner
- Belle da Costa Greene
- Mary Emogene Hazeltine
- Caroline Maria Hewins
- Mary Frances Isom
- Alice Bertha Kroeger
- Mary Wright Plummer
- Josephine Adams Rathbone
- Katharine Lucinda Sharp
- Lutie Eugenia Stearns
- Alice Sarah Tyler
- Beatrice Winser
- Mary Elizabeth Wood

=== Literary Scholars ===
- Katharine Lee Bates
- Lucy Martin Donnelly
- Emily Clara Jordan Folger
- Myra Reynolds
- Edith Rickert
- Alice D. Snyder

=== Magazine Editors ===
- Mary Louise Booth
- Mary Edwards Bryan
- Helen Archibald Clarke
- Mary Bayard Devereux Clarke
- Jane Cunningham Croly
- Mary Elizabeth Mapes Dodge
- Harriet Farley
- Jeannette Leonard Gilder
- Sarah Josepha Buell Hale
- Gertrude Battles Lane
- Lucy Larcom
- Eliza Leslie
- Miriam Florence Folline Leslie
- Harriet Monroe
- Charlotte Endymion Porter
- Margaret Elizabeth Munson Sangster
- Caroline Mehitable Fisher Sawyer
- Milicent Washburn Shinn
- Emmeline Blanche Woodward Wells
- Abigail Goodrich Whittelsey

=== Mathematicians ===
- Charlotte Angas Scott

=== Ministers and Evangelists ===
- Martha Gallison Moore Avery
- Hannah Jenkins Barnard
- Antoinette Louisa Brown Blackwell
- Olympia Brown
- Augusta Jane Chapin
- Elizabeth Leslie Rous Comstock
- Caroline Julia Bartlett Crane
- Mary Dyer
- Annis Bertha Ford Eastman
- Mary Fisher
- Eliza Paul Kirkbride Gurney
- Phebe Ann Coffin Hanaford
- Sophia Wigington Hume
- Rebecca Jones
- Sybil Jones
- Harriet Livermore
- Aimee Semple McPherson
- Lucretia Coffin Mott
- Phoebe Worrall Palmer
- Anna Howard Shaw
- Amanda Berry Smith
- Hannah Whitall Smith
- Caroline Augusta White Soule
- Anna Carpenter Garlin Spencer
- Mary Coffyn Starbuck
- Margaret Ann Newton Van Cott
- Amanda M. Way
- Jennie Fowler Willing

=== Missionaries ===
- Eliza Jane Gillett Bridgman
- Saint Frances Xavier Cabrini
- Fanny Marion Jackson Coppin
- Mary Florence Denton
- Rose Philippine Duchesne
- Cynthia Farrar
- Fidelia Fiske
- Alice Seymour Browne Frame
- Mary Hannah Fulton
- Alice Winfield Gordon Gulick
- Mother Mary Bridget Hayden
- Laura Askew Haygood
- Frances Maria Mulligan Hill
- Sybil Jones 1808-1873
- Ann Hasseltine Judson
- Emily Chubbuck Judson
- Sarah Hall Boardman Judson
- Anna Sarah Kugler
- Susan Law McBeth
- Jean Kenyon Mackenzie
- Susan Lincoln Tolman Mills
- Sarah Luella Miner
- Lottie Digges Moon
- Harriet Atwood Newell
- Mary Mills Patrick
- Lucy Whitehead McGill Waterbury Peabody
- Mary Reed
- Ann Eliza Worcester Robertson
- Mother Mary Baptist Russell
- Eliza Hart Spalding
- Clara A. Swain
- Eliza Talcott
- Isabella Thoburn
- Lillias Stirling Horton Underwood
- Minnie Vautrin
- Narcissa Prentiss Whitman
- Mary Elizabeth Wood
- Laura Maria Sheldon Wright

=== Missionary Society Leaders ===
- Belle Harris Bennett
- Mary Katharine Jones Bennett
- Alice Blanchard Merriam Coleman
- Sarah Platt Haines Doremus
- Martha Hillard MacLeish
- Lucy Jane Rider Meyer
- Helen Barrett Montgomery
- Angelia Louise French Thurston Newman
- Lucy Whitehead McGill Waterbury Peabody
- Jane Marie Bancroft Robinson
- Jennie Fowler Willing
- Annie Turner Wittenmyer

=== Mormon Women ===
- Eliza Roxey Snow Smith
- Emma Hale Smith
- Emmeline Blanche Woodward Wells
- Ann Eliza Webb Young

=== Music Educators and Patrons ===
- Emma Azalia Smith Hackley
- Adella Prentiss Hughes
- Clara Damrosch Mannes
- Georgia Lydia Stevens
- Ellen Battell Stoeckel
- Maria Longworth Nichols Storer
- Jeannette Meyers Thurber

=== Naturalists ===
- Florence Augusta Merriam Bailey
- Anna Botsford Comstock
- Neltje Blanchan De Graff Doubleday
- Fannie Pearson Hardy Eckstorm
- Maria Martin
- Olive Thorne Miller
- Lydia White Shattuck
- Mary Morris Vaux Walcott
- Mabel Osgood Wright

=== Negro Women ===
- Maria Louise Baldwin
- Janie Porter Barrett
- Eva del Vakia Bowles
- Hallie Quinn Brown
- Mary Ann Shadd Cary
- Fanny Marion Jackson Coppin
- Ellen Craft
- Sarah Mapps Douglass Douglass
- Sarah J. Smith Thompson Garnet
- Elizabeth Taylor Greenfield
- Charlotte L. Forten Grimke
- Emma Azalia Smith Hackley
- Frances Ellen Watkins Harper
- Addie D. Waites Hunton
- Matilda Sissieretta Joyner Jones
- Elizabeth Keckley
- Lucy Craft Laney
- Edmonia Lewis
- Rose McClendon
- Mary Eliza Mahoney
- Victoria Earle Matthews
- Florence Mills
- Lucy Ella Moten
- Alice Dunbar Nelson
- Mary Ellen Pleasant
- Charlotte E. Ray
- Gertrude Pridgett Rainey
- Sarah Parker Remond
- Josephine St. Pierre Ruffin
- Lucy Diggs Slowe
- Amanda Berry Smith
- Bessie Smith
- Maria W. Miller Stewart
- Adah B. Samuels Thoms
- Sojourner Truth
- Harriet Tubman
- Maggie Lena Walker
- Sarah Breedlove Walker
- Ida Bell Wells-Barnett
- Phillis Wheatley
- Fannie Barrier Williams

=== Newspaperwomen ===
- Elizabeth Anne Chase Akers Allen
- Mary E. Clemmer Ames
- Harriet Hubbard Ayer
- Winifred Sweet Black
- Cornelia Smith Bradford
- Emily Pomona Edson Briggs
- Elisabeth Luther Cary
- Mary Ann Shadd Cary
- Jane Cunningham Croly
- Rheta Childe Dorr
- Rebecca Ann Latimer Felton
- Kate Field
- Ann Smith Franklin

=== Performing Musicians ===
- Jeannette Leonard Gilder
- Mary Katherine Goddard
- Sarah Updike Goddard
- Nixola Greeley-Smith
- Anne Catherine Hoof Green
- Margherita Arlina Hamm
- Ida A. Husted Harper
- Alice Henry
- Elizabeth Garver Jordan
- Florence Finch Kelly
- Amy Leslie
- Annie Louise Brown Leslie
- Sophie Irene Simon Loeb
- Anne Elizabeth McDowell
- Marie Manning
- Leila Mechlin
- Marie Mattingly Meloney
- Eliza Jane Poitevent Holbrook Nicholson
- Anna Sartorius Uhl Ottendorfer
- Clementina Rind
- Anne Newport Royall
- Ellen Browning Scripps
- Elizabeth Cochrane Seaman
- Katharine Margaret Brownlee Sherwood
- Agnes Smedley
- Jane Grey Cannon Swisshelm
- Ann Timothy
- Elizabeth Timothy
- Cornelia Wells Walter
- Ida Bell Wells-Barnett
- Julia Amanda Sargent Wood

=== Nurses ===
- Ella Phillips Crandall
- Jane Arminda Delano
- Sister Mary Joseph Dempsey
- Sister Elizabeth Fedde
- Mary Eliza Mahoney
- Anna Caroline Maxwell
- Mary Adelaide Nutting
- Sophia French Palmer
- Louise Mathilde Powell
- Linda Richards
- Isabel Adams Hampton Robb
- Julia Catherine Stimson
- Adah B. Samuels Thoms
- Adeline Blanchard Tyler
- Lillian D. Wald

=== Painters ===
- Cecilia Beaux
- Fidelia Bridges
- Jennie Augusta Brownscombe
- Mary Cassatt
- Lucia Fairchild Fuller
- Anne Wilson Goldthwaite
- Sarah Goodridge
- Eliza Pratt Greatorex
- Susan Hale
- Ann Hall
- Anna Eliza Hardy
- Sophia Amelia Peabody Hawthorne
- Henrietta Johnston
- Helen Mary Knowlton
- Maria Martin
- Anna Claypoole Peale
- Margaretta Angelica Peale
- Sarah Miriam Peale
- Eunice Griswold Pinney
- Ellen Gertrude Emmet Rand
- Emily Sartain
- Lilly Martin Spencer
- Florine Stettheimer
- Mary Morris Vaux Walcott
- Irene Weir

=== Peace Advocates ===
- Jane Addams
- Fannie Fern Phillips Andrews
- Hannah Clark Johnston Bailey
- Carrie Clinton Lane Chapman Catt
- Mary Coffin Ware Dennett
- Helena Stuart Dudley
- Crystal Eastman
- Jessie Annette Jack Hooper
- Belva Ann Bennett McNall Lockwood
- Lucia True Ames Mead
- Caroline Love Goodwin O'Day
- Rosika Schwimmer
- Fanny Garrison Villard
- Anna White
- Mary Emma Woolley

=== Performing Musicians ===
- Emma Abbott
- Anna Riviere Bishop
- Sophie Braslau
- Teresa Carreño
- Annie Louise Cary 1841-1921
- Eleonora de Cisneros
- Zelie de Lussan
- Amy Fay
- Della May Fox
- Elizabeth Taylor Greenfield
- Alma Gluck
- Emma Azalia Smith Hackley
- Minnie Hauk
- Louise Dilworth Beatty Homer
- Helen Hopekirk
- Matilda Sissieretta Joyner Jones
- Emma Johanna Antonia Juch
- Clara Louise Kellogg
- Selma Kronold
- Clara Damrosch Mannes
- Grace Moore
- Helen Morgan
- Emma Nevada
- Alice Nielsen
- Lillian Nordica
- Adelina Patti
- Adelaide Phillipps
- Maud Powell
- Gertrude Pridgett Rainey
- Corinne Rider-Kelsey
- Julie Rive-King
- Olga Samaroff
- Sibyl Swift Sanderson
- Ernestine Schumann-Heink
- Marcella Sembrich
- Bessie Smith
- Emma Cecilia Thursby
- Camilla Urso
- Marie Van Zandt
- Edyth Walker
- Ellen Beach Yaw
- Fannie Bloomfield Zeisler

=== Philanthropists ===
- Elizabeth Milbank Anderson
- Bernice Pauahi Bishop
- Lizzie Plummer Bliss
- Ellen Warren Scripps Booth
- Catherine Wolfe Bruce
- Mary Gwendolin Caldwell
- Louise Whitfield Carnegie
- Ednah Dow Littlehale Cheney
- Anna Virginia Russell Cole
- Ellen Collins 1828-1912
- Claribel Cone
- Etta Cone
- Grace Hoadley Dodge
- Mary Anna Palmer Draper
- Clara Driscoll
- Dorothy Leib Harrison Wood Eustis
- Carrie Bamberger Frank Fuld
- Mary Elizabeth Garrett
- Catherine Littlefield Greene
- Anna M. Richardson Harkness
- Mary Emma Stillman Harkness
- Mary Williamson Averell Harriman
- Margaret Gaffney Haughery
- Louisine Waldron Elder Havemeyer
- Phoebe Apperson Hearst
- Mary Porter Tileston Hemenway
- Winifred Holt
- Emily Howland
- Anna Thomas Jeanes
- Helen Hartley Jenkins
- Kate Macy Ladd
- Irene Lewisohn
- Edith Rockefeller McCormick
- Nettie Fowler McCormick
- Josephine Louise Le Monnier Newcomb
- Anna Sartorius Uhl Ottendorfer
- Lizzie Pitts Merrill Palmer
- Elizabeth Peck Perkins
- Sarah Anne Worthington King Peter
- Caroline Amanda Sherfey Rand
- Elisabeth Mills Reid
- Abby Greene Aldrich Rockefeller
- Grace Rainey Rogers
- Margaret Olivia Slocum Sage
- Ellen Browning Scripps
- Pauline Agassiz Shaw
- Sophia Smith
- Ellin Leslie Prince Lowery Speyer
- Jane Eliza Lathrop Stanford
- Ellen Battell Stoeckel
- Caroline Phelps Stokes
- Olivia Egleston Phelps Stokes
- Elizabeth Rowell Thompson
- Jeannette Meyers Thurber
- Kate Nichols Trask
- Fanny Garrison Villard
- Sarah Breedlove Walker
- Emma Carola Woerishoffer
- Catharine Lorillard Wolfe

=== Philosophers ===
- Mary Whiton Calkins
- Julia Henrietta Gulliver
- Christine Ladd-Franklin

=== Photographer ===
- Gertrude Stanton Käsebier

=== Physicians ===
- Sara Josephine Baker
- Katharine Isabel Hayes Chapin Barrows
- Alice Bennett
- Elizabeth Blackwell
- Emily Blackwell
- Rachel Littler Bodley
- Anna Elizabeth Broomall
- Charlotte Amanda Blake Brown
- Ruth Jane Mack Brunswick
- Cloe Annette Buckel
- Emeline Horton Cleveland
- Claribel Cone
- Hannah Maria Conant Tracy Cutler
- Annie Sturges Daniel
- Lydia Maria Adams De Witt
- Susan Dimock
- Sarah Read Adamson Dolley
- Anne Walter Fearn
- Lydia Folger Fowler
- Mary Hannah Fulton
- Love Rosa Hirschmann Gantt
- Harriot Kezia Hunt
- Kate Campbell Hurd-Mead
- Elizabeth Hurdon
- Mary Corinna Putnam Jacobi
- Anna Sarah Kugler
- Hannah E. Myers Longshore
- Clemence Sophia Harned Lozier
- Anita Newcomb McGee
- Clara Marshall
- Sara Tew Mayo
- Marie Josepha Mergler
- Eliza Maria Mosher
- Bethenia Angelina Owens-Adair
- Susan La Flesche Picotte
- Ann Preston
- Sarah Parker Remond
- Martha George Rogers Ripley
- Jane Elizabeth Robbins
- Mary Jane Safford
- Lucy Ellen Sewall
- Mary Sherwood
- Sarah Ann Hackett Stevenson
- Clara A. Swain
- Lucy Beaman Hobbs Taylor
- Mary Frame Myers Thomas
- Mary Harris Thompson
- Martha Tracy
- Lillias Stirling Horton Underwood
- Lilian Welsh
- Martha Wollstein
- Rachelle Slobodinsky Yarros
- Marie Elizabeth Zakrzewska

=== Political Figures ===
==== Advisers and Appointees ====
- Grace Abbott
- Lady Frances Berkeley
- Harriet Morehead Berry
- Margaret Brent
- Kate Richards O'Hare Cunningham
- Katherine Philips Edson
- Harriet Wiseman Elliott
- Rebecca Ann Latimer Felton
- Jessie Ann Benton Fremont
- Helen Hamilton Gardener
- Belle Case La Follette
- Julia Clifford Lathrop
- Mary Simmerson Cunningham Logan
- Belle Lindner Israels Moskowitz
- Hannah Jane Patterson
- Mary Harriman Rumsey
- Anna Howard Shaw
- Sue Shelton White

==== Congresswomen and Senators ====
- Hattie Ophelia Wyatt Caraway
- Rebecca Ann Latimer Felton
- Winnifred Sprague Mason Huck
- Florence Prag Kahn
- Katherine Gudger Langley
- Caroline Love Goodwin O'Day
- Alice Mary Robertson
- Ruth Hanna McCormick Simms

==== Other Elected Officials ====
- Kate Barnard
- Anna Wilmarth Thompson Ickes
- Belle Kearney
- Hannah Jensen Kempfer
- Mary Olszewski Kryszak
- Bertha Ethel Knight Landes

==== Party Workers ====
- Hallie Quinn Brown
- Kate Richards O'Hare Cunningham
- Annie LePorte Diggs
- Clara Driscoll
- Katherine Philips Edson
- Sarah Elizabeth Van De Vort Emery
- Clara Shortridge Foltz
- Judith Ellen Horton Foster
- Mary Garrett Hay
- Mary Elizabeth Clyens Lease
- Alice Dunbar Nelson
- Marion Marsh Todd
- Harriet Taylor Upton
- Hortense Sparks Malsch Ward
- Sue Shelton White

==== Propagandists ====
- Anna Ella Carroll
- Jane Maria Eliza McManus Storms Cazneau
- Sarah Elizabeth Van De Vort Emery
- Jessie Ann Benton Fremont
- Rose O'Neal Greenhow
- Mary Phelps Austin Holley
- Marion Marsh Todd

=== Printmakers ===
- Anna Botsford Comstock
- Mary Nimmo Moran
- Frances Flora Bond Palmer
- Emily Sartain

=== Prison Reformers ===
- Katharine Isabel Hayes Chapin Barrows
- Maud Ballington Booth
- Elizabeth Leslie Rous Comstock
- Kate Richards O'Hare Cunningham
- Katharine Bement Davis
- Martha Platt Falconer
- Eliza Wood Burhans Farnham
- Rebecca Ann Latimer Felton
- Clara Shortridge Foltz
- Abigail Hopper Gibbons
- Linda Gilbert
- Emma Amelia Hall
- Jessie Donaldson Hodder
- Ellen Cheney Johnson
- Julia Strudwick Tutwiler
- Caroline Bayard Wittpen

=== Psychologists ===
- Mary Whiton Calkins
- June Downey
- Mary Parker Follett
- Leta Anna Stetter Hollingworth
- Christine Ladd-Franklin
- Lillien Jane Martin
- Milicent Washburn Shinn
- Margaret Floy Washburn
- Helen Bradford Thompson Woolley
- Caroline Beaumont Zachry

=== Religious Educators ===
- Joanna Graham Bethune
- Harriet E. Bishop
- Josephine Van Dyke Brownson
- Mother Marie Joseph Butler
- Adelaide Teague Case
- Cornelia Augusta Connelly
- Mother Angela Gillespie
- Rebecca Gratz
- Mother Mary Aloysia Hardey
- Sister Julia McGroarty
- Mary Kimball Morgan
- Ellen Albertina Polyblank
- Mary Rhodes
- Elizabeth Ann Rogers
- Elizabeth Ann Bayley Seton
- Georgia Lydia Stevens
- Henrietta Benigna Justine Zinzendorf von Watteville

=== Religious Founders and Leaders ===
- Anne Ayres
- Helena Petrovna Hahn Blavatsky
- Evangeline Cory Booth
- Maud Ballington Booth
- Saint Frances Xavier Cabrini
- Harriet Starr Cannon
- Cornelia Augusta Connelly
- Mary Fenn Davis
- Frances Dickinson
- Rose Philippine Duchesne
- Mary Baker Eddy
- Myrtle Page Fillmore
- Ann Leah, Margaret, and Catherine Fox - Fox sisters
- Ursula Newell Gestefeld
- Mother Angela Gillespie
- Mother Mary Aloysia Hardey
- Barbara Ruckle Heck
- Barbara Heinemann
- Emma Curtis Hopkins
- Anne Hutchinson
- Mother Mary Alphonsa Lathrop
- Ann Lee
- Aimee Semple McPherson
- Ann Teresa Matthews
- Mary Rhodes
- Mother Benedicta Riepp
- Mother Mary Baptist Russell
- Elizabeth Ann Bayley Seton
- Catherine Spalding
- Augusta Emma Simmons Stetson
- Henrietta Szold
- Katherine Augusta Westcott Tingley
- Alma Bridwell White
- Anna White
- Ellen Gould Harmon White
- Jemima Wilkinson
- Lucy Wright

See also Ministers and Evangelists; Missionaries

=== School Founders and Administrators ===
- Jane Andrews
- Mathilde Franziska Giesler Anneke
- Mary Atkins
- Maria Louise Baldwin
- Janie Porter Barrett
- Catharine Esther Beecher
- Martha McChesney Berry
- Anna Elvira Bliss
- Mary Lucinda Bonney
- Anna Callender Brackett
- Amy Morris Bradley
- Eliza Jane Gillet Bridgman
- Mother Marie Joseph Butler
- Fanny Marion Jackson Coppin
- Betsey Mix Cowles
- Prudence Crandall
- Sarah Ann Dickey
- Susan Almira Miller Dorsey
- Rose Philippine Duchesne
- Abbie Park Ferguson
- Mother Angela Gillespie
- Zilpah Polly Grant
- Emily Griffith
- Alice Winfield Gordon Gulick
- Cornelia Hancock
- Mother Mary Aloysia Hardey
- Mother Mary Bridget Hayden
- Laura Askew Haygood
- Frances Maria Mulligan Hill
- Sallie Holley
- Emily Howland
- Agnes Irwin
- Elisabeth Antoinette Irwin
- Eliza Kellas
- Lucy Craft Laney
- Mary Lyon
- Martha Hillard MacLeish
- Susan Lincoln Tolman Mills
- Myrtilla Miner
- Sarah Luella Miner
- Anna Morgan
- Mary Kimball Morgan
- Mary Mortimer
- Lucy Ella Moten
- Sophia B. Packard
- Celestia Susannah Parrish
- Almira Hart Lincoln Phelps
- Sarah Pierce
- Ellen Albertina Polyblank
- Sarah Porter
- Julia Richman
- Alice Mary Robertson
- Elizabeth Ann Rogers
- Susanna Haswell Rowson
- Mildred Lewis Rutherford
- Martha Schofield
- May Eliza Wright Sewall
- Mary Easton Sibley
- Anna Peck Sill
- Lucinda Hinsdale Stone
- Laura Matilda Towne
- Julia Strudwick Tutwiler
- Henrietta Benigna Justine Zinzendorf von Watteville
- Helen Magill White
- Emma Hart Willard
- Sophie Bell Wright
- Ella Flagg Young

=== Sculptors ===
- Mary Abastenia St. Leger Eberle
- Harriet Goodhue Hosmer
- Edmonia Lewis
- Helen Farnsworth Mears
- Elisabet Ney
- Vinnie Ream
- Janet Scudder
- Emma Stebbins
- Anne Whitney
- Gertrude Vanderbilt Whitney
- Patience Lovell Wright

=== Settlement House Leaders ===
- Grace Abbott
- Jane Addams
- Gertrude Barnum
- Cornelia Foster Bradford
- Anna Hempstead Branch
- Helena Stuart Dudley
- Lizzie Black Kander
- Florence Kelley
- Julia Clifford Lathrop
- Irene Lewisohn
- Mary Eliza McDowell
- Eleanor Laura McMain
- Katherine Pettit
- Jane Elizabeth Robbins
- Ellen Gates Starr
- Alzina Parsons Stevens
- Lillian D. Wald
- Elizabeth Sprague Williams

=== Social and Civic Reformers ===
- Albion Fellows Bacon
- Kate Barnard
- Emily Perkins Bissell
- Lucretia Longshore Blankenburg
- Madeline McDowell Breckinridge
- Sophonisba Preston Breckinridge
- Helen Stuart Campbell
- Ellen Collins
- Katharine Coman
- Sallie Sims Southall Cotten
- Caroline Julia Bartlett Crane
- Annie Sturges Daniel
- Katharine Bement Davis
- Sarah Sophia Chase Piatt Decker
- Mary Clare de Graffenried
- Abby Morton Diaz
- Annie LePorte Diggs
- Crystal Eastman
- Katherine Philips Edson
- Hannah Bachman Einstein
- Charlotte Champe Stearns Eliot
- Elizabeth Glendower Evans
- Lucy Louisa Coues Flower
- Minnie Ursula Oliver Scott Rutherford Fuller
- Mary Smith Garrett
- Charlotte Anna Perkins Stetson Gilman
- Elisabeth Gilman
- Josephine Clara Goldmark
- Jean Margaret Gordon
- Kate M. Gordon
- Margaret Angela Haley
- Cornelia Hancock
- Frances Ellen Watkins Harper
- Ellen Martin Henrotin
- Lucy Virginia Dorsey lams
- Mary Hall Ingham
- Pattie Ruffner Jacobs
- Mary Morton Kimball Kehew
- Florence Kelley
- Susan Myra Kingsbury
- Alice Lakey
- Bertha Ethel Knight Landes
- Julia Clifford Lathrop
- Annie Laws
- Sophie Irene Simon Loeb
- Juliette Magill Kinzie Gordon Low
- Josephine Shaw Lowell
- George Madden Martin
- Abigail Williams May
- Helen Barrett Montgomery
- Belle Lindner Israels Moskowitz
- Mary Eno Bassett Mumford
- Mary Cooke Branch Munford
- Ellen Spencer Mussey
- Maud Nathan
- Caroline Love Goodwin O'Day
- Hannah Kent Schoff
- Louisa Lee Schuyler
- Hannah Greenebaum Solomon
- Anna Carpenter Garlin Spencer
- Alzina Parsons Stevens
- Caroline Phelps Stokes
- Olivia Egleston Phelps Stokes
- Eliza L. Sproat Randolph Turner
- Clara Hampson Ueland
- Lila Hardaway Meade Valentine
- Marie Louise Van Vorst
- Kate Gannett Wells
- Fannie Barrier Williams
- Caroline Bayard Stevens Wittpen
- Emma Carola Woerishoffer
- Edith Elmer Wood

See also Health Reform Advocates; Laborers; Settlement House Leaders

=== Social Economists ===
- Josephine Clara Goldmark
- Susan Myra Kingsbury
- Jessica Blanche Peixotto
- Edith Elmer Wood
- Helen Laura Sumner Woodbury

=== Social Leaders ===
- Marian Hooper Adams
- Caroline Webster Schermerhorn Astor
- Alva Erskine Smith Vanderbilt Belmont
- Anne Willing Bingham
- Anne Charlotte Lynch Botta
- Theodosia Burr
- Mary Gwendolin Caldwell
- Jennie Jerome Churchill
- Virginia Caroline Tunstall Clay-Clopton
- Anna Virginia Russell Cole
- Mary Victoria Leiter Curzon
- Mollie Evelyn Moore Davis
- Elsie De Wolfe
- Adele Cutts Douglas
- Annie Adams Fields
- Marian Graves Anthon Fish
- Rebecca Franks
- Isabella Stewart Gardner
- Elizabeth Graeme Ferguson
- Catherine Littlefield Greene
- Rose O'Neal Greenhow
- Constance Cary Harrison
- Harriet Lane Johnston
- Eliza Jumel
- Grace Elizabeth King
- Octavia Celeste Walton Le Vert
- Edith Rockefeller McCormick
- Evalyn Walsh McLean
- Dolley Payne Todd Madison
- Louise Chandler Moulton
- Bertha Honore Palmer
- Lucy Petway Holcombe Pickens
- Sara Agnes Rice Pryor
- Elisabeth Mills Reid
- Catherine Van Rensselaer Schuyler
- Mary Elizabeth Wilson Sherwood
- Margaret Bayard Smith
- Ellin Leslie Prince Lowery Speyer
- Kate Chase Sprague
- Blanche Oelrichs Thomas Barrymore Tweed
- Priscilla Cooper Tyler
- Elizebeth Thomas Werlein

=== Social Workers ===
- Sophonisba Preston Breckinridge
- Emily Wayland Dinwiddie
- Mary Willcox Brown Glenn
- Susan Myra Kingsbury
- Alice Louise Higgins Lothrop
- Anna Beach Pratt
- Agnes Gertrude Regan
- Mary Ellen Richmond
- Zilpha Drew Smith

=== Socialists and Radicals ===
- Martha Gallison Moore Avery
- Kate Richards O'Hare Cunningham
- Elizabeth Glendower Evans

=== Temperance Advocates ===
- Elisabeth Gilman
- Emma Goldman
- Carrie Rand Herron
- Florence Kelley
- Maria Maud Leonard McCreery
- Helen Marot
- Caroline Amanda Sherfey Rand
- Lola Ridge
- Agnes Smedley
- Ellen Gates Starr
- Rose Harriet Pastor Stokes
- Frances Wright

=== Suffragists ===
- Mathilde Franziska Giesler Anneke
- Susan Brownell Anthony
- Rachel G. Foster Avery
- Alva Erskine Smith Vanderbilt Belmont
- Emily Perkins Bissell
- Ada Matilda Cole Bittenbender
- Alice Stone Blackwell
- Antoinette Louisa Brown Blackwell
- Lillie Devereux Blake
- Lucretia Longshore Blankenburg
- Harriot Eaton Stanton Blatch
- Amelia Jenks Bloomer
- Inez Milholland Boissevain
- Madeline McDowell Breckinridge
- Olympia Brown
- Carrie Clinton Lane Chapman Catt
- Elizabeth Buffum Chace
- Ednah Dow Littlehale Cheney
- Grace Giddings Clarke
- Laura Clay
- Virginia Caroline Tunstall Clay-Clopton
- Clara Dorothy Bewick Colby
- Phoebe Wilson Couzins
- Hannah Maria Conant Tracy Cutler
- Katharine Bement Davis
- Mary Fenn Davis
- Paulina Kellogg Wright Davis
- Mary Coffin Ware Dennett
- Josephine Marshall Jewell Dodge
- Abigail Jane Scott Duniway
- Sarah Barnwell Elliott
- Clara Shortridge Foltz
- Minnie Ursula Oliver Scott Rutherford Fuller
- Matilda Joslyn Gage
- Helen Hamilton Gardener
- Jean Margaret Gordon
- Kate M. Gordon
- Laura de Force Gordon
- Helen Mar Jackson Gougar
- Mary Grew
- Josephine Sophia White Griffing
- Ida A. Husted Harper
- Louisine Waldron Elder Havemeyer
- Mary Garrett Hay
- Grace Raymond Hebard
- Isabella Beecher Hooker
- Jessie Annette Jack Hooper
- Julia Ward Howe
- Emily Howland
- Mary Hall Ingham
- Pattie Ruffner Jacobs
- Belle Kearney
- Harriet Burton Laidlaw
- Miriam Florence Folline Leslie
- Mary Ashton Rice Livermore
- Belva Ann Bennett McNall Lockwood
- Maria Maud Leonard McCreery
- Catharine Gouger Waugh McCulloch
- Abigail Williams May
- Caroline Elizabeth Thomas Merrick
- Virginia Louisa Minor
- Esther Hobart McQuigg Slack Morris
- Maud Nathan
- Hannah Jane Patterson
- Marilla Marks Young Ricker
- Harriet Jane Hanson Robinson
- Caroline Maria Seymour Severance
- May Eliza Wright Sewall
- Anna Howard Shaw
- Nettie Rogers Shuler
- Abby Hadassah Smith
- Julia Evelina Smith
- Elizabeth Cady Stanton
- Lucy Stone
- Martha Carey Thomas
- Mary Frame Myers Thomas
- Eliza L. Sproat Randolph Turner
- Clara Hampson Ueland
- Harriet Taylor Upton
- Lila Hardaway Meade Valentine
- Fanny Garrison Villard
- Catharine Van Valkenburg Waite
- Zerelda Gray Sanders Wallace
- Amanda M. Way
- Emmeline Blanche Woodward Wells
- Kate Gannett Wells
- Ida Bell Wells-Bamett
- Sue Shelton White
- Victoria Claflin Woodhull
- Maud Younger

=== Temperance Advocates ===
- Hannah Clark Johnston Bailey
- Josephine Abiah Penfield Cushman Bateham
- Ada Matilda Cole Bittenbender
- Amelia Jenks Bloomer
- Martha McClellan Brown
- Matilda Bradley Carse
- Sarah Flournoy Moore Chapin
- Julia Colman
- Elizabeth Leslie Rous Comstock
- Judith Ellen Horton Foster
- Lydia Folger Fowler
- Minnie Ursula Oliver Scott Rutherford Fuller
- Frances Dana Barker Gage
- Anna Adams Gordon
- Helen Mar Jackson Gougar
- Frances Ellen Watkins Harper
- Mary Garrett Hay
- Mary Hannah Hanchett Hunt
- Belle Kearney
- Mary Greenleaf Clement Leavitt
- Mary Ashton Rice Livermore
- Caroline Elizabeth Thomas Merrick
- Emily Clark Huntington Miller
- Carry Amelia Moore Nation
- Hannah Whitall Smith
- Lillian Marion Norton Ames Stevens
- Eliza Daniel Stewart
- Cora Frances Stoddard
- Eliza Jane Trimble Thompson
- Zerelda Gray Sanders Wallace
- Amanda M. Way
- Frances Elizabeth Caroline Willard
- Jennie Fowler Willing
- Annie Turner Wittenmyer

=== Translators ===
- Mary Louise Booth
- Hannah O'Brien Chaplin Conant
- Isabel Florence Hapgood
- Annie Aubertine Woodward Moore
- Katharine Prescott Wormeley

=== Welfare Work Leaders ===
- Fanny Baker Ames
- Janie Porter Barrett
- Kate Harwood Waller Barrett
- Clara Barton
- Adèle Parmentier Bayer
- Joanna Graham Bethune
- Mabel Thorp Boardman
- Evangeline Cory Booth
- Maud Ballington Booth
- Eva del Vakia Bowles
- Harriet Starr Cannon
- Jennie Collins
- Mabel Cratty
- Vera Charlotte Scott Cushman
- Grace Hoadley Dodge
- Josephine Marshall Jewell Dodge
- Sarah Platt Haines Doremus
- Sister Elizabeth Fedde
- Annie Adams Fields
- Lucy Louisa Coues Flower
- Isabella Marshall Graham
- Rebecca Gratz
- Josephine Sophia White Griffing
- Elizabeth Schuyler Hamilton
- Margaret Gaffney Haughery
- Laura Smith Haviland
- Ellen Martin Henrotin
- Elizabeth Christophers Kimball Hobson
- Jane Currie Blaikie Höge
- Emily Huntington
- Addie D. Waites Hunton
- Frances Wisebart Jacobs
- Mother Mary Alphonsa Lathrop
- Josephine Shaw Lowell
- Victoria Earle Matthews
- Lucy Jane Rider Meyer
- Sister Anthony O'Connell
- Phoebe Worrall Palmer
- Sarah Anne Worthington King Peter
- Margaret Barrett Allen Prior
- Martha George Rogers Ripley
- Jane Marie Bancroft Robinson
- Mary Harriman Rumsey
- Mother Mary Baptist Russell
- Jessie Ethel Sampter
- Louisa Lee Schuyler
- Daisy Florence Simms
- Virginia Thrall Smith
- Hannah Greenebaum Solomon
- Henrietta Szold
- Kate Gannett Wells
- Louise Waterman Wise
- Annie Turner Wittenmyer
- Caroline Bayard Stevens Wittpen
- Sophie Bell Wright

See also Social Workers

=== Wives of the Presidents ===
- Abigail Smith Adams
- Louisa Catherine Johnson Adams
- Ellen Lewis Herndon Arthur
- Frances Folsom Cleveland
- Abigail Powers Fillmore
- Lucretia Rudolph Garfield
- Florence Kling Harding
- Anna Symmes Harrison
- Caroline Lavinia Scott Harrison
- Mary Scott Dimmick Harrison
- Lucy Ware Webb Hayes
- Lou Henry Hoover
- Rachel Donelson Robards Jackson
- Martha Wayles Skelton Jefferson
- Eliza McCardle Johnson
- Mary Ann Todd Lincoln
- Ida Saxton McKinley
- Dolley Payne Todd Madison
- Elizabeth Kortright Monroe
- Jane Means Appleton Pierce
- Sarah Childress Polk
- Alice Hathaway Lee Roosevelt
- Edith Kermit Carow Roosevelt
- Helen Herron Taft
- Margaret Mackall Smith Taylor
- Julia Gardiner Tyler
- Letitia Christian Tyler
- Hannah Hoes Van Buren
- Martha Dandridge Custis Washington
- Ellen Louise Axson Wilson

=== Women's Club Leaders ===
- Alice Josephine McLellan Birney
- Lucretia Longshore Blankenburg
- Hallie Quinn Brown
- Grace Giddings Clarke
- Sallie Sims Southall Cotten
- Jane Cunningham Croly
- Ann Pamela Cunningham
- Flora Adams Darling
- Sarah Sophia Chase Piatt Decker
- Ellen Louise Curtis Demorest
- Sarah Elizabeth Doyle
- Clara Driscoll
- Sarah J. Smith Thompson Garnet
- Frances Ellen Watkins Harper
- Ellen Martin Henrotin
- Julia Ward Howe
- Louisa Boyd Yeomans King
- Alice Lakey
- Bertha Ethel Knight Landes
- Annie Laws
- Roberta Campbell Lawson
- Victoria Earle Matthews
- Abigail Williams May
- Mary Eno Bassett Mumford
- Harriet Jane Hanson Robinson
- Josephine St. Pierre Ruffin
- Carolina Maria Seymour Severance
- May Eliza Wright Sewall
- Mary Belle King Sherman
- Katharine Margaret Brownlee Sherwood
- Nettie Rogers Shuler
- Hannah Greenebaum Solomon
- Lucinda Hinsdale Stone
- Eliza L. Sproat Randolph Turner
- Ellen Hardin Walworth
- Ida Bell Wells-Bamett
- Fannie Barrier Williams
- Alice Vivian Ames Winter

== Women included in Volume 4 ==
=== Agriculture and Rural Life ===
- Mary Agnes Chase
- Minnie Fisher Cunningham
- Margaret Loyd Jarman Hagood
- Edith Elizabeth Lowry
- Edna Belle Sewell
- Jessie Field Shambaugh
- Louise Stanley

=== Anthropology and Folklore ===
- Maria Cadilla de Martinez
- Ella Cara Deloria
- Frances Theresa Densmore
- Zora Neale Hurston
- Louise Pound
- Hortense Powdermaker
- Gladys Amanda Reichard
- Ruth Sawyer

=== Architecture ===
- Nora Stanton Barney
- Catherine Krouse Bauer
- Marion Mahony Griffin
- Sophia Gregoria Hayden
- Julia Morgan

See also Landscape Architecture

=== Art ===
- Blanche Ames
- Romaine Brooks
- Katherine Sophie Dreier
- Meta Vaux Warrick Fuller
- Marion Mahony Griffin
- Edith Gregor Halpert
- Eva Hesse
- Malvina Cornell Hoffman
- Anna Vaughn Hyatt Huntington
- Adelaide Johnson
- Dorothy Wright Liebes
- Dorothy Eugenia Miner
- Anna Mary Robertson (Grandma) Moses
- Irene Rice Pereira
- Hilla Rebay
- Gisela Marie Augusta Richter
- Anne Ryan
- Aline Milton Bernstein Saarinen
- Kay Linn Sage
- Augusta Christine Savage
- Mary Hamilton Swindler

See also Photography

=== Astronomy ===
- Antonia Caetana De Paiva Pereira Maury

=== Aviation ===
- Ruth Rowland Nichols
- Phoebe Jane Fairgrave Omlie
- Mabel Walker Willebrandt

=== Biology ===
- Rachel Louise Carson
- Ethel Browne Harvey
- Libbie Henrietta Hyman
- Ann Haven Morgan
- Margaret Morse Nice

=== Birth Control ===
- Blanche Ames Ames
- Sophia Josephine Kleegman
- Lena Levine
- Katharine Dexter McCormick
- Margaret Sanger
- Gertrude Agnes Muller
- Mary Engle Pennington
- Marjorie Merriweather Post
- Ida Cohen Rosenthal
- Helena Rubinstein
- Margaret Fogarty Rudkin
- Dorothy Shaver
- Annie Minerva Turnbo-Malone
- Ruth Fanshaw Waldo
- Ethel Berenice Weed
- Eartha Mary Magdalene White

=== Chemistry ===
- Emma Perry Carr
- Mary Engle Pennington

See also Medicine: Researchers; Nutrition

=== Botany ===
- Emma Lucy Braun
- Mary Agnes Chase
- Alice Eastwood
- Margaret Clay Ferguson

=== Broadcasting ===
- Gracie Allen
- Gertrude Edelstein Berg
- Fanny Brice
- Dorothy Lerner Gordon
- Frieda Barkin Hennock
- Hattie McDaniel
- Nila Mack
- Agnes Moorehead
- Irna Phillips
- Aline Milton Bernstein Saarinen
- Dorothy Thompson
- Judith Cary Waller

=== Children's Literature ===
- May Hill Arbuthnot
- Margaret Wise Brown
- Esther Forbes
- Inez Haynes Gillmore Irwin
- May Massee
- Bertha Mahony Miller
- Lucy Sprague Mitchell
- Anne Carroll Moore
- Ruth Sawyer
- Laura Ingalls Wilder

=== Civil Liberties ===
- Elizabeth Gurley Flynn
- Jessie Wallace Hughan
- Dorothy Kenyon
- Carol Weiss King
- Business
- Polly Adler
- Elizabeth Arden
- Beatrice Fox Auerbach
- Nora Stanton Barney
- Hattie Carnegie
- Christine McGaffey Frederick
- Lillian Moller Gilbreth
- Jennie Grossinger
- Edith Gregor Halpert
- Elizabeth Hawes
- Blanche Wolf Knopf
- Dorothy Wright Liebes
- Perle Mesta
- Julia Morgan

=== Civil Rights ===
- Jessie Daniel Ames
- Josephine Baker
- Mary Cornelia Barker
- Charlotta Spears Bass
- Mary McLeod Bethune
- Crystal Dreda Bird Fauset
- Irene McCoy Gaines
- Lorraine Hansberry
- Elizabeth Ross Haynes
- Alice Mae Lee Jemison
- Daisy Elizabeth Adams Lampkin
- Mary White Ovington
- Eslanda Cardoza Goode Robeson
- Ruby Doris Smith-Robinson
- Anna Eleanor Roosevelt
- Lillian Smith
- Mary Church Terrell
- Dorothy Eugenia Rogers Tilly

=== Classics and Archaeology ===
- Hetty Goldman
- Edith Hamilton
- Gisela Marie Augusta Richter
- Mary Hamilton Swindler
- Lily Ross Taylor

=== Community Affairs ===
- Beatrice Fox Auerbach
- Jennie Loitman Barron
- Louise deKoven Bowen
- Selena Sloan Butler
- Eunice Hunton Carter
- Minnie Fisher Cunningham
- Frances Elliott Davis
- Ethel Sturges Dummer
- Irene McCoy Gaines
- Edna Fischel Gellhorn
- Elizabeth Ross Haynes
- Ima Hogg
- Alice Mae Lee Jemison
- Rebekah Bettelheim Kohut
- Daisy Elizabeth Adams Lampkin
- Belle Sherwin
- Mary Church Terrell
- Marguerite Milton Wells
- Eartha Mary Magdalene White
- Muriel Hazel Wright

=== Conservation ===
- Mary Lee Jobe Akeley
- Emma Lucy Braun
- Rachel Louise Carson
- Alice Eastwood
- Ann Haven Morgan
- Margaret Morse Nice
- Consumer Affairs
- Mildred Edie Brady
- Persia Crawford Campbell
- Mary Williams Dewson
- Elinore Morehouse Herrick
- Dorothy Kenyon
- Hazel Kyrk
- Lucy Randolph Mason
- Frances Perkins
- Louise Stanley

=== Cookery ===
- Adelle Davis
- Irma Louise von Starkloff Rombauer
- Margaret Fogarty Rudkin
- Alice Babette Toklas

=== Dance ===
- Elizabeth Burchenal
- Irene Castle
- Marian Chace
- Doris Humphrey
- Ruth St. Denis
- Helen Tamiris

=== Demography ===
- Margaret Loyd Jarman Hagood
- Irene Barnes Taeuber

=== Economics ===
- Emily Greene Balch
- Persia Crawford Campbell
- Hazel Kyrk
- Anna Rochester (see under Grace Hutchins)
- Theresa Wolfson

=== Education ===
==== College Founders and Administrators ====
- Mary McLeod Bethune
- Katharine Blunt
- Margaret Antoinette Clapp
- Ada Louise Comstock
- Mother Mary Katharine Drexel
- Hallie Mae Ferguson Flanagan
- Virginia Crocheron Gildersleeve
- Alice Spencer Geddes Lloyd
- Annie Nathan Meyer
- Lucy Sprague Mitchell
- Matilda Smyrell Calder Thurston
- Edna Noble White
- Sister Madeleva (Mary Evaline) Wolff

==== School Founders and Administrators ====
- Ethel Percy Andrus
- May Hill Arbuthnot
- Mary Cornelia Barker
- Mary McLeod Bethune
- Charlotte Eugenia Hawkins Brown
- Nannie Helen Burroughs
- Flora Juliette Cooke
- Anna Julia Haywood Cooper
- Maude Frazier
- Edith Hamilton
- Helen Ira Jarrell
- Rebekah Bettelheim Kohut
- Alice Spencer Geddes Lloyd
- Georgia Lee Witt Lusk
- Louise Leonard McLaren
- Helen Parkhurst
- Jessie Field Shambaugh
- Catherine Brieger Stern

==== Writers and Researchers ====
- May Hill Arbuthnot
- Dorothy Canfield Fisher
- Florence Laura Goodenough
- Sidonie Matsner Gruenberg
- Clara Savage Littledale
- Lucy Sprague Mitchell
- Catherine Brieger Stern
- Ruth May Strang
- Hilda Taba

==== Other ====
- Mary Cornelia Barker
- Jennie Loitman Barron
- Anita McCormick Blaine
- Selma Munter Borchardt
- Selena Sloan Butler
- Ethel Sturges Dummer
- Dorothy Canfield Fisher
- Jessie Wallace Hughan
- Helen Ira Jarrell
- Agnes Ernst Meyer
- Mary Church Terrell
- Winifred Louise Ward

See also Physical Education

=== Engineering and Industrial Design ===
- Nora Stanton Barney
- Edith Clarke
- Irmgard Flügge-Lotz
- Lillian Moller Gilbreth
- Gertrude Agnes Muller
- Mary Engle Pennington
- Marie Gertrude Rand

=== Entertainment ===
- Gracie Allen
- Josephine Baker
- Fanny Brice
- Irene Castle
- Judy Garland
- Sonja Henie
- Billie Holiday
- Janis Lyn Joplin
- Gypsy Rose Lee
- Sophie Tucker

=== Exploration ===
- Mary Lee Jobe Akeley
- Grace Gallatin Seton

=== Fashion ===
- Aline Frankau Bernstein
- Hattie Carnegie
- Edna Woolman Chase
- Elizabeth Hawes
- Dorothy Wright Liebes
- Claire McCardell
- Ida Cohen Rosenthal
- Dorothy Shaver

=== Feminism ===
- Blanche Ames Ames
- Nora Stanton Barney
- Mary Elizabeth Bass
- Mary Ritter Beard
- Emily Newell Blair
- Maria Cadilla de Martinez
- Lavinia Lloyd Dock
- Elizabeth Hawes
- Inez Haynes Gillmore Irwin
- Adelaide Johnson
- Dorothy Kenyon
- Gail Laughlin
- Muna Lee
- Esther Pohl Lovejoy
- Katharine Dexter McCormick
- Anne Henrietta Martin
- Perle Mesta
- Emma Guffey Miller
- Lena Madesin Phillips
- Anita Lily Pollitzer
- Ruth Bryan Owen Rohde
- Margaret Sanger
- Ann London Scott
- Grace Gallatin Seton
- Bertha Van Hoosen
- Mabel Vernon

=== Film ===
- Theda Bara
- Iris Barry
- Anne Bauchens
- Clara Gordon Bow
- Maya Deren
- Judy Garland
- Dorothy Gish
- Betty Grable
- Susan Hayward
- Sonja Henie
- Judy Holliday
- Hedda Hopper
- Hattie McDaniel
- Jeanette MacDonald
- Frances Marion
- Marilyn Monroe
- Agnes Moorehead
- Dorothy Rothschild Parker
- Louella Oettinger Parsons
- ZaSu Pitts
- Anna May Wong
- Blanche Yurka

=== Geology ===
- Tilly Edinger
- Julia Anna Gardner
- Winifred Goldring
- Eleanora Frances Bliss Knopf

=== Government and politics ===
==== Appointees ====
- Annette Abbott Adams
- Mary Anderson
- Mary McLeod Bethune
- Esther Caukin Brunauer
- Persia Crawford Campbell
- Margaret Antoinette Clapp
- Hallie Mae Ferguson Flanagan
- Maude Frazier
- Florence Jaffray Hurst Harriman
- Frieda Barkin Hennock
- Jane Margueretta Hoey
- Muna Lee
- Perle Mesta
- Frieda Segelke Miller
- Frances Perkins
- Ivy Maude Baker Priest
- Ruth Bryan Owen Rohde
- Anna Eleanor Roosevelt
- Louise Stanley
- Mary Elizabeth Switzer
- Mary Abby Van Kleeck
- Ellen Sullivan Woodward

==== Congresswomen ====
- Georgia Lee Witt Lusk
- Helen Douglas Mankin
- Mary Teresa Hopkins Norton
- Jeannette Pickering Rankin
- Edith Nourse Rogers
- Ruth Bryan Owen Rohde

==== Other Elected Officials ====
- Crystal Dreda Bird Fauset
- Miriam Amanda Wallace Ferguson
- Maude Frazier
- Gail Laughlin
- Georgia Lee Witt Lusk
- Helen Douglas Mankin
- Ivy Maude Baker Priest
- Nellie Nugent Somerville
- Ellen Sullivan Woodward

==== Party Workers and Officials ====
- Annette Abbott Adams
- Charlotta Spears Bass
- Emily Newell Blair
- Genevieve Rose Cline
- Minnie Fisher Cunningham
- Mary Williams Dewson
- Crystal Dreda Bird Fauset
- Irene McCoy Gaines
- Florence Jaffray Hurst Harriman
- Emma Guffey Miller
- Cornelia Elizabeth Bryce Pinchot
- Ivy Maude Baker Priest
- Pauline Morton Sabin

==== Wives of Presidents ====
- Grace Anna Goodhue Coolidge
- Anna Eleanor Roosevelt
- Edith Boiling Galt Wilson

=== History ===
- Mary Ritter Beard
- Catherine Shober Drinker Bowen
- Margaret Antoinette Clapp
- Anna Julia Haywood Cooper
- Esther Forbes
- Constance McLaughlin Green
- Beatrice Fry Hyslop
- Bertha Haven Putnam
- Mary Clabaugh Wright
- Muriel Hazel Wright

=== Home Economics ===
- Katharine Blunt
- Christine McGaffey Frederick
- Lillian Moller Gilbreth
- Hazel Kyrk
- Agnes Fay Morgan
- Lydia Jane Roberts
- Louise Stanley
- Edna Noble White

=== Housing Reform ===
- Catherine Krouse Bauer
- Mary Kingsbury Simkhovitch
- International Affairs
- Esther Caukin Brunauer
- Vera Micheles Dean
- Muna Lee
- Anne Elizabeth O'Hare McCormick
- Anna Eleanor Roosevelt
- Dorothy Thompson
- Ruth Frances Woodsmall

=== Journalism ===
- Charlotta Spears Bass
- Mildred Edie Brady
- Julia de Burgos
- Elisabeth May Adams Craig
- Minnie Fisher Cunningham
- Doris Fleeson
- Bess Furman
- Elizabeth Meriwether (Dorothy Dix) Gilmer
- Dorothy Lerner Gordon
- Josephine Herbst
- Elinore Morehouse Herrick
- Lorena Hickok
- Marguerite Higgins
- Hedda Hopper
- Alice Mae Lee Jemison
- Clara Savage Littledale
- Alice Spencer Geddes Lloyd
- Anne Elizabeth O'Hare McCormick
- Agnes Ernst Meyer
- Louella Oettinger Parsons
- Alicia Patterson
- Emily Price Post
- Helen Miles Rogers Reid
- Jane Parker Deeter Rippin
- Anna Eleanor Roosevelt
- Aline Milton Bernstein Saarinen
- Anna Louise Strong
- Dorothy Thompson
- Irita Bradford Van Doren
- Mary Heaton Vorse

=== Labor ===
- Mary Anderson
- Mary Cornelia Barker
- Ella Reeve Bloor
- Selma Munter Borchardt
- Elisabeth Christman
- Fannia Mary Cohn
- Gladys Marie Dickason
- Mary Elisabeth Dreier
- Elizabeth Gurley Flynn
- Elizabeth Hawes
- Elinore Morehouse Herrick
- Grace Hutchins
- Helen Ira Jarrell
- Frances Kellor
- Louise Leonard McLaren
- Lucy Randolph Mason
- Frieda Segelke Miller
- Mary Teresa Hopkins Norton
- Julia Sarsfield O'Connor Parker
- Frances Perkins
- Rose Pesotta
- Rose Schneiderman
- Florence Calvert Thorne
- Mary Abby Van Kleeck
- Mary Heaton Vorse
- Theresa Wolfson

=== Landscape Architecture ===
- Beatrix Jones Farrand

=== Law ===
- Annette Abbott Adams
- Florence Ellinwood Allen
- Jennie Loitman Barron
- Mary Margaret Bartelme
- Selma Munter Borchardt
- Eunice Hunton Carter
- Genevieve Rose Cline
- Frieda Barkin Hennock
- Dorothy Kenyon
- Carol Weiss King
- Gail Laughlin
- Helen Douglas Mankin
- Lena Madesin Phillips
- Mabel Walker Willebrandt

=== Librarianship ===
- Linda Anne Eastman
- Helen Elizabeth Haines
- Anne Carroll Moore
- Isadore Gilbert Mudge

=== Literature ===
==== Editors and Publishers ====
- Margaret Carolyn Anderson
- Sylvia Woodbridge Beach
- Jessie Redmon Fauset
- Jane Heap (see under Margaret Carolyn Anderson)
- Blanche Wolf Knopf
- Amy Loveman
- Marianne Craig Moore
- Irita Bradford Van Doren

==== Scholars ====
- Louise Pound
- Vida Dutton Scudder
- Rosemond Tuve
- Helen Constance White

==== Translators ====
- Louise Bogan
- Hilda (H.D.) Doolittle
- Edith Hamilton
- Muna Lee
- Helen Tracy Lowe-Porter
- Marianne Craig Moore

==== Writers ====
- Natalie Barney
- Iris Barry
- Emily Newell Blair
- Louise Bogan
- Catherine Shober Drinker Bowen
- Pearl Buck
- Julia de Burgos
- Maria Cadilla de Martinez
- Hilda (H.D.) Doolittle
- Jessie Redmon Fauset
- Edna Ferber
- Sara Bard Field
- Dorothy Canfield Fisher
- Esther Forbes
- Edith Hamilton
- Josephine Herbst
- Fannie Hurst
- Zora Neale Hurston
- Inez Haynes Gillmore Irwin
- Shirley Hardie Jackson
- Helen Keller
- Gypsy Rose Lee
- Muna Lee
- Helen Tracy Lowe-Porter
- Mabel Dodge Luhan
- Carson McCullers
- Lucy Sprague Mitchell
- Annie Nathan Meyer
- Marianne Craig Moore
- Kathleen Thompson Norris
- Flannery O'Connor
- Dorothy Rothschild Parker
- Sylvia Plath
- Emily Price Post
- Marjorie Kinnan Rawlings
- Mary Roberts Rinehart
- Mari Sandoz
- Grace Gallatin Seton
- Anne Gray Harvey Sexton
- Lillian Smith
- Ruth Suckow
- Alice Babette Toklas
- Mary Heaton Vorse
- Helen Constance White
- Laura Ingalls Wilder
- Sister Madeleva (Mary Evaline) Wolff
- Anzia Yezierska

=== Magazine and Journal Editing ===
- Edith Abbott
- Mildred Edie Brady
- Edna Woolman Chase
- Vera Micheles Dean
- Edith Juliet Rich Isaacs
- Clara Savage Littledale
- Bertha Mahony Miller
- Dorothy Eugenia Miner
- Mary May Roberts
- Ruth May Strang
- Mary Hamilton Swindler
- Muriel Hazel Wright

=== Mathematics ===
- Irmgard Flügge-Lotz
- Hilda Geiringer
- Margaret Loyd Jarman Hagood
- Catherine Brieger Stern
- Anna Johnson Pell Wheeler

=== Medicine ===
==== Physicians ====
- Hattie Elizabeth Alexander
- Dorothy Hansine Andersen
- Virginia Apgar
- Mary Elizabeth Bass
- Gerty Theresa Radnitz Cori
- Gladys Rowena Henry Dick
- Helen Flanders Dunbar
- Ethel Collins Dunham
- Virginia Kneeland Frantz
- Frieda Fromm-Reichmann
- Grace Arabell Goldsmith
- Rosetta Sherwood Hall
- Alice Hamilton
- Karen Danielsen Homey
- Sara Claudia Murray Jordan
- Sophia Josephine Kleegman
- Elise Strang L'Esperance
- Lena Levine
- Esther Pohl Lovejoy
- Madge Thurlow Macklin
- Dorothy Reed Mendenhall
- Lillie Rosa Minoka-Hill
- Louise Pearce
- Florence Rena Sabin
- Ida Sophia Scudder
- Clara Thompson
- Bertha Van Hoosen
- Anna Wessels Williams

==== Researchers ====
- Hattie Elizabeth Alexander
- Dorothy Hansine Andersen
- Gerty Theresa Radnitz Cori
- Gladys Rowena Henry Dick
- Alice Catherine Evans
- Virginia Kneeland Frantz
- Grace Arabell Goldsmith
- Elizabeth Lee Hazen
- Elise Strang L'Esperance
- Madge Thurlow Macklin
- Dorothy Reed Mendenhall
- Louise Pearce
- Judith Graham Pool
- Jane Anne Russell
- Florence Rena Sabin
- Maud Slye
- Anna Wessels Williams

=== Military ===
- Florence Aby Blanchfield
- Virginia Crocheron Gildersleeve
- Edith Nourse Rogers
- Ethel Berenice Weed
- Ruth Frances Woodsmall

=== Music ===
- Marion Eugénie Bauer
- Elizabeth Sprague Coolidge
- Ruth Porter Crawford-Seeger
- Mabel Wheeler Daniels
- Frances Theresa Densmore
- Angela Diller
- Emma Hayden Eames
- Geraldine Farrar
- Dorothy Fields
- Mary Garden
- Judy Garland
- Hazel Lucile Harrison
- Billie Holiday
- Mahalia Jackson
- Janis Lyn Joplin
- Ethel Leginska
- Hattie McDaniel
- Jeanette MacDonald
- Marian Griswold Nevins MacDowell
- Abbie Mitchell
- Florence Beatrice Smith Price
- Grace Harriet Spofford
- Helen Mulford Thompson
- Jennie Tourel
- Helen Francesca Traubel
- Mary Louise Curtis Bok Zimbalist

=== Nursing ===
- Margaret Gene Arnstein
- Florence Aby Blanchfield
- Mary Breckinridge
- Frances Elliott Davis
- Lavinia Lloyd Dock
- Mary Sewall Gardner
- Annie Warburton Goodrich
- Mary May Roberts
- Margaret Sanger
- Belle Sherwin
- Isabel Maitland Stewart
- Carolyn Conant Van Blarcom

=== Nutrition ===
- Katharine Blunt
- Adelle Davis
- Grace Arabell Goldsmith
- Agnes Fay Morgan
- Lydia Jane Roberts
- Louise Stanley

=== Peace ===
- Nora Stanton Barney
- Emily Greene Balch
- Alice Hamilton
- Georgia Elma Harkness
- Jessie Wallace Hughan
- Hannah Hallowell Clothier Hull
- Grace Hutchins
- Anne Henrietta Martin
- Jeannette Pickering Rankin
- Vida Dutton Scudder
- Ruth Suckow
- Mary Church Terrell
- Mabel Vernon

=== Penology and Criminology ===
- Mary Margaret Bartelme
- Louise deKoven Bowen
- Augusta Fox Bronner
- Mary Williams Dewson
- Ethel Sturges Dummer
- Mary Belle Harris
- Eleanor Touroff Glueck
- Jane Parker Deeter Rippin
- Miriam Van Waters
- Mabel Walker Willebrandt

=== Philanthropy ===
- Anita McCormick Blaine
- Louise deKoven Bowen
- Elizabeth Sprague Coolidge
- Ethel Sturges Dummer
- Jennie Grossinger
- Jane Margueretta Hoey
- Ima Hogg
- Fannie Hurst
- Katharine Dexter McCormick
- Agnes Ernst Meyer
- Anne Tracy Morgan
- Marjorie Merriweather Post
- Helena Rubinstein
- Sophie Tucker
- Annie Minerva Turnbo-Malone
- Mary Louise Curtis Bok Zimbalist

=== Philosophy ===
- Hannah Arendt

=== Photography ===
- Mary Lee Jobe Akeley
- Diane Nemerov Arbus
- Margaret Bourke-White
- Frances Benjamin Johnston
- Dorothea Lange

=== Physical Education ===
- Jessie Hubbell Bancroft
- Elizabeth Burchenal
- Frances Kellor
- Ethel Perrin

=== Physics ===
- Elda Emma Anderson
- Maria Gertrude Goeppert Mayer
- Marie Gertrude Rand
- Political Science
- Hannah Arendt
- Vera Micheles Dean

=== Psychiatry and Psychoanalysis ===
- Helen Flanders Dunbar
- Frieda Fromm-Reichmann
- Karen Danielsen Horney
- Lena Levine
- Clara Thompson
- Psychology
- Augusta Fox Bronner
- Charlotte Bertha Bühler
- Else Frenkel-Brunswik
- Lillian Moller Gilbreth
- Florence Laura Goodenough
- Marie Gertrude Rand
- Ruth May Strang
- Jessie Taft
- Hilda Taba

=== Public health ===
- Elda Emma Anderson
- Virginia Apgar
- Margaret Gene Arnstein
- Mary Breckinridge
- Frances Elliott Davis
- Gladys Rowena Henry Dick
- Lavinia Lloyd Dock
- Ethel Collins Dunham
- Alice Catherine Evans
- Mary Sewall Gardner
- Grace Arabell Goldsmith
- Alice Hamilton
- Elizabeth Lee Hazen
- Mary Cromwell Jarrett
- Elise Strang L'Esperance
- Esther Pohl Lovejoy
- Dorothy Reed Mendenhall
- Louise Pearce
- Mary Engle Pennington
- Florence Rena Sabin
- Carolyn Conant Van Blarcom
- Anna Wessels Williams

=== Religion ===
- Ella Alexander Boole
- Nannie Helen Burroughs
- Donaldina Mackenzie Cameron
- Mother Mary Katharine Drexel
- Helen Flanders Dunbar
- Rosetta Sherwood Hall
- Georgia Elma Harkness
- Hannah Hallowell Clothier Hull
- Mahalia Jackson
- Rebekah Bettelheim Kohut
- Edith Elizabeth Lowry
- Mary Ely Lyman
- Mother Mary Joseph (Mary Josephine) Rogers
- Ida Sophia Scudder
- Vida Dutton Scudder
- Matilda Smyrell Calder Thurston
- Dorothy Eugenia Rogers Tilly
- Sister Madeleva (Mary Evaline) Wolff

=== Settlements ===
- Emily Greene Balch
- Louise deKoven Bowen
- Donaldina Mackenzie Cameron
- Angela Diller
- Lavinia Lloyd Dock
- Alice Hamilton
- Mary White Ovington
- Vida Dutton Scudder
- Mary Kingsbury Simkhovitch
- Grace Harriet Spofford
- Eartha Mary Magdalene White

=== Socialism and Radicalism ===
- Angela Bambace
- Ella Reeve Bloor
- Elizabeth Gurley Flynn
- Josephine Herbst
- Jessie Wallace Hughan
- Helen Keller
- Carol Weiss King
- Eslanda Cardoza Goode Robeson
- Ethel Greenglass Rosenberg
- Vida Dutton Scudder
- Anna Louise Strong
- Mary Abby Van Kleeck

=== Social Reform ===
- Edith Abbott
- Emily Greene Balch
- Donaldina Mackenzie Cameron
- Mary Williams Dewson
- Lavinia Lloyd Dock
- Mary Elisabeth Dreier
- Alice Hamilton
- Helen Keller
- Frances Kellor
- Dorothy Kenyon
- Lucy Randolph Mason
- Frances Perkins
- Anna Eleanor Roosevelt
- Rose Schneiderman
- Vida Dutton Scudder
- Mary Kingsbury Simkhovitch
- Mary Church Terrell
- Mary Abby Van Kleeck

=== Social Research ===
- Edith Abbott
- Joanna Carver Colcord
- Mary Williams Dewson
- Margaret Loyd Jarman Hagood
- Elizabeth Ross Haynes
- Frances Kellor
- Emma Octavia Lundberg
- Frieda Segelke Miller
- Mary White Ovington
- Mary Abby Van Kleeck
- Theresa Wolfson

=== Social Welfare ===
- Ethel Percy Andrus
- Edith Terry Bremer
- Pearl Buck
- Ethel Sturges Dummer
- Helen Keller
- Rebekah Bettelheim Kohut
- Rose Hum Lee
- Edith Elizabeth Lowry
- Anne Tracy Morgan
- Mary Elizabeth Switzer
- Eartha Mary Magdalene White

=== Social Work ===
- Edith Abbott
- Edith Terry Bremer
- Ida Maud Cannon
- Joanna Carver Colcord
- Grace Longwell Coyle
- Mary Williams Dewson
- Eleanor Touroff Glueck
- Gordon Hamilton
- Jane Margueretta Hoey
- Mary Cromwell Jarrett
- Emma Octavia Lundberg
- Lydia Rapoport
- Jane Parker Deeter Rippin
- Jessie Taft
- Charlotte Helen Towle
- Miriam Van Waters

=== Sociology ===
- Eleanor Touroff Glueck
- Margaret Loyd Jarman Hagood
- Rose Hum Lee
- Irene Barnes Taeuber

=== Sports ===
- Sonja Henie
- Louise Pound
- Eleonora Randolph Sears
- Hazel Hotchkiss Wightman
- Mildred Ella Didrikson Zaharias / Babe Didrikson Zaharias

=== Suffrage ===
- Florence Ellinwood Allen
- Blanche Ames Ames
- Jessie Daniel Ames
- Nora Stanton Barney
- Mary Ritter Beard
- Emily Newell Blair
- Ella Reeve Bloor
- Louise deKoven Bowen
- Lucy Burns
- Maria Cadilla de Martinez
- Mary Agnes Chase
- Minnie Fisher Cunningham
- Mary Williams Dewson
- Lavinia Lloyd Dock
- Katherine Sophie Dreier
- Mary Elisabeth Dreier
- Sara Bard Field
- Edna Fischel Gellhorn
- Hannah Hallowell Clothier Hull
- Inez Haynes Gillmore Irwin
- Adelaide Johnson
- Daisy Elizabeth Adams Lampkin
- Gail Laughlin
- Katharine Dexter McCormick
- Anne Henrietta Martin
- Emma Guffy Miller
- Maud Wood Park
- Cornelia Elizabeth Bryce Pinchot
- Anita Lily Pollitzer
- Jeannette Pickering Rankin
- Helen Miles Rogers Reid
- Rose Schneiderman
- Grace Gallatin Seton
- Belle Sherwin
- Nellie Nugent Somerville
- Mary Church Terrell
- Mabel Vernon
- Marguerite Milton Wells

==== Antisuffrage ====
- Annie Nathan Meyer

=== Temperance and Prohibition ===
- Ella Alexander Boole
- Kathleen Thompson Norris
- Nellie Nugent Somerville
- Mabel Walker Willebrandt

==== Prohibition Repeal ====
- Emma Guffey Miller
- Pauline Morton Sabin

=== Theater ===
- Maude Adams
- Tallulah Brockman Bankhead
- Ethel Barrymore
- Gertrude Edelstein Berg
- Aline Frankau Bernstein
- Katharine Cornell
- Rachel Crothers
- Ruth Draper
- Edna Ferber
- Dorothy Fields
- Hallie Mae Ferguson Flanagan
- Berta Gersten
- Lorraine Hansberry
- Theresa Helburn
- Judy Holliday
- Edith Juliet Rich Isaacs
- Margo Jones
- Carson McCullers
- Abbie Mitchell
- Agnes Moorehead
- Jean Rosenthal
- Winifred Louise Ward
- Margaret Webster
- Blanche Yurka

=== Women's Organizations ===
==== American Association of University Women ====
- Esther Caukin Brunauer
- Ada Louise Comstock
- Virginia Crocheron Gildersleeve
- Helen Constance White

==== League of Women Voters ====
- Jessie Daniel Ames
- Emily Newell Blair
- Minnie Fisher Cunningham
- Edna Fischel Gellhorn
- Lucy Randolph Mason
- Emma Guffey Miller
- Maud Wood Park
- Belle Sherwin
- Marguerite Milton Wells

==== National Association of Colored Women ====
- Mary McLeod Bethune
- Selena Sloan Butler
- Irene McCoy Gaines
- Elizabeth Ross Haynes
- Daisy Elizabeth Adams Lampkin
- Mary Church Terrell

==== National Council of Negro Women ====
- Mary McLeod Bethune
- Charlotte Eugenia Hawkins Brown
- Eunice Hunton Carter
- Daisy Elizabeth Adams Lampkin
- Mary Church Terrell

==== National Federation of Business and Professional Women ====
- Gail Laughlin
- Lena Madesin Phillips

==== National Woman's Party ====
- Nora Stanton Barney
- Mary Ritter Beard
- Lucy Burns
- Lavinia Lloyd Dock
- Sara Bard Field
- Inez Haynes Gillmore Irwin
- Gail Laughlin
- Muna Lee
- Anne Henrietta Martin
- Perle Mesta
- Emma Guffey Miller
- Anita Lily Pollitzer
- Mabel Vernon

==== Women's International League for Peace and Freedom ====
- Emily Greene Balch
- Hannah Hallowell Clothier Hull
- Anne Henrietta Martin
- Jeannette Pickering Rankin
- Mary Church Terrell
- Mabel Vernon

==== Women's Trade Union League ====
- Mary Anderson
- Emily Greene Balch
- Elisabeth Christman
- Mary Elisabeth Dreier
- Frieda Segelke Miller
- Julia Sarsfield O'Connor Parker
- Rose Schneiderman

==== YWCA ====
- Edith Terry Bremer
- Charlotte Eugenia Hawkins Brown
- Eunice Hunton Carter
- Grace Longwell Coyle
- Crystal Dreda Bird Fauset
- Elizabeth Ross Haynes
- Louise Leonard McLaren
- Lucy Randolph Mason
- Lena Madesin Phillips
- Jessie Field Shambaugh
- Ruth Frances Woodsmall

==== Other ====
- Jessie Daniel Ames
- Genevieve Rose Cline
- Meta Vaux Warrick Fuller
- Rebekah Bettelheim Kohut
- Anne Tracy Morgan
- Jane Parker Deeter Rippin
- Edna Belle Sewell
- Dorothy Eugenia Rogers Tilly
- Ethel Berenice Weed

== Women included in Volume 5 ==
=== Advertising/Public Relations ===
- Doris E. Fleischman Bernays
- Anne Hummert
- Anna Marie Lederer Rosenberg

=== Anthropology/Folklore ===
- Theodora Mead Abel
- Ruth Leah Bunzel
- Lydia Cabrera
- Eleanor Leacock
- Margaret Mead
- Pearl Primus
- Mary Pukui
- Te Ata
- Ruth Murray Underhill

=== Archaeology/Classics ===
- Margarete Bieber
- Marija BirutÏ AlseikaitÏ Gimbutas
- Tatiana Proskouriakoff
- Hannah Marie Wormington

=== Architecture ===
- Elisabeth Coit
- Esther McCoy
- Lutah Maria Riggs

=== Art ===
- Kathy Acker
- Anni Albers
- Djuna Barnes
- Gwendolyn Bennett
- Isabel Bishop
- Selma Burke
- Lydia Cabrera
- Theresa Hak Kyung Cha
- Elaine de Kooning
- Dominique De Menil
- Ray Eames
- Angna Enters
- Marsha Gomez
- Nancy Graves
- Clementine Hunter
- Estelle Ishigo
- Miyoko Ito
- Lois Mailou Jones
- Corita Kent
- Lee Krasner
- Ana Mendieta
- Joan Mitchell
- Alice Neel
- Louise Nevelson
- Georgia O'Keeffe
- Betty Parsons
- Marjorie Acker Phillips
- Hannah Wilke

=== Art Collectors/Dealers ===
- Dominique De Menil
- Peggy Guggenheim
- Betty Parsons
- Marjorie Acker Phillips

=== Astronomy ===
- Cecilia Payne-Gaposchkin
- Beatrice Muriel Tinsley

=== Aviation ===
- Olive Ann Mellor Beech
- Jacqueline Cochran
- Joy Bright Hancock
- Nancy Harkness Love
- Christa McAuliffe
- Jeannette Ridlon Piccard
- Judith Resnik
- Katherine Stinson
- Louise Thaden

=== Biochemistry ===
- Rachel Fuller Brown
- Gertrude Belle Elion
- Charlotte Friend
- Gladys Hobby
- Rebecca Craighill Lancefield
- Barbara McClintock
- Ruth Sager
- Dorothy Maud Wrinch

=== Biology ===
- Ruth Harriet Bleier
- Mary (Polly) Ingraham Bunting
- Dian Fossey
- Charlotte Friend
- Gladys Hobby
- Rebecca Craighill Lancefield
- Barbara McClintock
- Jane Marion Oppenheimer
- Dixy Lee Ray
- Ruth Sager
- Berta Vogel Scharrer

=== Birth Control/Family Planning ===
- Mary Steichen Calderone
- Estelle Trebert Griswold
- Mary Woodard Reinhardt Lasker
- Emily Hartshorne Mudd
- Harriet Fleischl Pilpel

=== Botany ===
- Katherine Esau
- Katharine Ordway

=== Business/Entrepreneurship ===
- Lucille Ball
- Olive Ann Mellor Beech
- Doris E. Fleischman Bernays
- Mary Clifford Caperton Bingham
- Hazel Gladys Bishop
- Connie Boucher
- Dorothy Buffum Chandler
- Joyce Chen
- Georgia Neese Clark
- Jacqueline Cochran
- Lilly Daché
- Olga Bertram Erteszek
- Bette Clair McMurray Nesmith Graham
- Florence Greenberg
- Florence Griffith Joyner
- Marjorie Stewart Joyner
- Effa Manley
- Sylvia Porter
- Josephine Roche
- Mary G. Roebling
- Anna Marie Lederer (Hoffman) Rosenberg
- Dorothy Schiff
- Victoria Regina Spivey
- Louise Thaden
- Brownie Wise

=== Chemistry ===
- Hazel Gladys Bishop
- Katharine Burr Blodgett
- Rachel Fuller Brown
- Mary Peters Fieser
- Anna Jane Harrison
- Icie Gertrude Macy Hoobler
- Hazel Katherine Stiebeling

=== Child Advocacy/Education ===
- Theodora Mead Abel
- Mary Dinsmore Salter Ainsworth
- Louise Bates Ames
- Jeanne Sternlicht Chall
- Mamie Phipps Clark
- Abigail Adams Eliot
- Martha May Eliot
- Selma Fraiberg
- Susan Walton Gray
- Helen Heffernan
- Carmelita Chase Hinton
- Icie Gertrude Macy Hoobler
- Edith Banfield Jackson
- Mary Cover Jones
- Marion Edwena Kenworthy
- Margaret Mahler
- Margaret Jeannette Naumburg
- Justine Wise Polier
- Zerna Addas Sharp
- Lois Hayden Meek Stolz

=== Children's Literature ===
- Harriet Stratemeyer Adams
- Augusta Baker
- Elizabeth Jane Coatsworth
- Virginia Haviland
- Ursula Nordstrom
- Ann Petry
- Zerna Addas Sharp
- Yoshiko Uchida

=== Civil Rights ===
- Frances Mary Albrier
- Sadie Tanner Mossell Alexander
- Anna Mae Aquash
- Ella Baker
- Daisy Lee Gatson Bates
- Sarah Patton Boyle
- Ruth Muskrat Bronson
- Lourdes Casal
- Mamie Phipps Clark
- Septima Poinsette Clark
- Lucy Friedlander Covington
- Barbara Deming
- Alice Allison Dunnigan
- Virginia Foster Durr
- Josefina Fierro
- Shirley Graham Du Bois
- Fannie Lou Hamer
- Grace Towns Hamilton
- Patricia Roberts Harris
- Anna Arnold Hedgeman
- María Latigo Hernández
- Ruby Hurley
- Estelle Ishigo
- Barbara Jordan
- Marjorie Stewart Joyner
- Margaret Eliza (Maggie) Kuhn
- Katharine Du Pre Lumpkin
- Luisa Moreno
- Anna Pauline (Pauli) Murray
- Graciela Olivarez
- Louise Alone Thompson Patterson
- Ethel L. Payne
- Mary Modjeska Monteith Simkins
- Hazel Brannon Smith
- Muriel Snowden
- Tish Sommers
- Mabel Doyle Keaton Staupers
- Johnnie Tillmon
- Fredi Washington
- Michi Nishiura Weglyn

==== El Congreso de Pueblos de Habla Española ====
- Josefina Fierro
- Luisa Moreno

==== Mexican American Political Association ====
- Francisca Flores

==== National Association for the Advancement of Colored People ====
- Frances Mary Albrier
- Ella Baker
- Daisy Lee Gatson Bates
- Sarah Patton Boyle
- Septima Poinsette Clark
- Marion Vera Cuthbert
- Virginia Foster Durr
- Shirley Graham Du Bois
- Wilma Scott Heide
- Ruby Hurley
- Florence Luscomb
- Effa Manley
- Gloria Martin
- Anna Pauline (Pauli) Murray
- Rose Finkelstein Norwood
- Mary Modjeska Monteith Simkins
- Mabel Doyle Keaton Staupers
- Fredi Washington
- Myra Komaroff Wolfgang

==== Southern Christian Leadership Council ====
- Ella Baker
- Septima Poinsette Clark

==== Southern Conference on Human Welfare ====
- Virginia Foster Durr
- Mary Modjeska Monteith Simkins

==== Student Non-Violent Coordinating Committee ====
- Ella Baker
- Fannie Lou Hamer

=== Community Activism/Local Government ===
- Frances Mary Albrier
- Sadie Tanner Mosell Alexander
- Anna Mae Aquash
- Ella Baker
- Toni Cade Bambara
- Pilar Barbosa de Rosario
- Leona Baumgartner
- Ruth Muskrat Bronson
- Letitia Woods Brown
- Lourdes Casal
- Aurora Castillo
- Dorothy Buffum Chandler
- Septima Poinsette Clark
- Lucy Friedlander Covington
- Josefina Fierro
- Francisca Flores
- Marsha Gomez
- Fannie Lou Hamer
- Grace Towns Hamilton
- Anna Arnold Hedgeman
- María Latigo Hernández
- Aki Kurose
- Myrtle Terry Lawrence
- Jane Kwong Lee
- Mollie Hong Min
- Maria Clemencia Colón Sánchez
- Mary Modjeska Monteith Simkins
- Muriel Snowden
- Tish Sommers
- Edith Rosenwald Stern
- Johnnie Tillmon
- Kazue Togasaki
- Elizabeth Wood

=== Computer Science ===
See Mathematics

=== Conservation/Environmentalism ===
- Connie Boucher
- Aurora Castillo
- Marjory Stoneman Douglas
- Helen Knothe Nearing
- Katharine Ordway
- Margaret Wentworth Owings
- Dixy Lee Ray
- Kim Williams

=== Conservatism ===
- Dorothy Fosdick
- Irene Corbally Kuhn
- Suzanne La Follette
- Ayn Rand
- Dixy Lee Ray

=== Consumer Affairs ===
- Betty Furness
- Esther Peterson
- Margaret Gilpin Reid
- Caroline Farrar Ware
- Aryness Joy Wickens

=== Crafts/Decorative Arts ===
- Anni Albers
- Elsie Allen
- Ray Eames
- Lucy Martin Lewis
- Maria Montoya Martinez
- Essie Parrish
- Polingaysi Qoyawayma

=== Dance ===
- Lucia Chase
- Alexandra Danilova
- Agnes De Mille
- Ragini Devi
- Angna Enters
- Martha Graham
- Margaret Newell H'Doubler
- Martha Hill
- Thelma Hill
- Hanya Holm
- Nora Kaye
- La Meri
- Carmelita Maracci
- Ruth Marian Page
- Pearl Primus
- Ginger Rogers
- Esther Rolle
- Bessie Schönberg
- Molly Spotted Elk
- Te Ata

=== Economics ===
- Barbara Nachtrieb Armstrong
- Alice Bourneuf
- Eveline M. Burns
- Eleanor Lansing Dulles
- Mary Dublin Keyserling
- Elizabeth Morrissy
- Margaret Gilpin Reid
- Phyllis Ann Wallace
- Aryness Joy Wickens

=== Education: General ===
- Amelia Agostini de del Río[1]
- María Teresa Babín
- Pilar Barbosa de Rosario
- Thea Bowman
- Ruth Muskrat Bronson
- Letitia Woods Brown
- Marjorie Lee Browne
- Mary (Polly) Ingraham Bunting
- Jeanne Sternlicht Chall
- Kathryn (Kay) Frederick Clarenbach
- Septima Poinsette Clark
- Alice Hanson Cook
- Marion Vera Cuthbert
- Eva Beatrice Dykes
- Abigail Adams Eliot
- Susan Walton Gray
- Edith Green
- Helen Heffernan
- Wilma Scott Heide
- Carmelita Chase Hinton
- Mildred McAfee Horton
- Lois Mailou Jones
- Flemmie Pansy Kittrell
- Elizabeth Duncan Koontz
- Aki Kurose
- Dorothy Maynor
- Christa McAuliffe
- Katharine McBride
- Bertha Clay McNeill
- Elizabeth Morrissy
- Margaret Jeannette Naumburg
- Polingaysi Qoyawayma
- Mina S. Rees
- Myra Pollack Sadker
- Zerna Addis Sharp
- Hilda Worthington Smith
- Lois Hayden Meek Stolz
- Trude Weiss-Rosmarin
- Barbara Mayer Wertheimer

=== Engineering/Technology ===
- Katharine Burr Blodgett
- Beatrice Alice Hicks
- Judith Resnik

=== English/Literary Theory ===
- María Teresa Babín
- Eva Beatrice Dykes
- Elaine Hedges
- Ellen Moers
- Margaret Walker

=== Fashion/Textile Design ===
- Hazel Gladys Bishop
- Lilly Daché
- Louise Dahl-Wolfe
- Ray Eames
- Olga Bertram Erteszek
- Millicent Fenwick
- Edith Head
- Vera Maxwell
- Clare Potter
- Irene Sharaff
- Diana Vreeland
- Ruth Whitney

=== Feminism ===
- Bella Abzug
- Donna Allen
- Toni Cade Bambara
- Jessie Shirley Bernard
- Doris E. Fleischman Bernays
- Ruth Harriet Bleier
- Mary (Polly) Ingraham Bunting
- Virginia (Toni) Carabillo
- Kathryn (Kay) Frederick Clarenbach
- Alice Hanson Cook
- Catherine East
- India Edwards
- Eleanor Flexner
- Francisca Flores
- Marsha Gomez
- Edith Green
- Elaine Hedges
- Wilma Scott Heide
- Margaret Ann Hickey
- Lucy Somerville Howorth
- Joan Kelly
- Mary Dublin Keyserling
- Elizabeth Duncan Koontz
- Margaret Eliza (Maggie) Kuhn
- Suzanne La Follette
- Eleanor Leacock
- Audre Lorde
- Florence Luscomb
- Olga Marie Madar
- Gloria Martin
- Burnita Shelton Matthews
- Ana Mendieta
- Ellen Moers
- Nelle Katharine Morton
- Anna Pauline (Pauli) Murray
- Alice Paul
- Esther Peterson
- Harriet Fleischl Pilpel
- Marguerite Rawalt
- Esther Rome
- Myra Pollack Sadker
- Clara Lemlich Shavelson
- Valerie Solanas
- Tish Sommers
- Johnnie Tillmon
- Sister Annette (Margaret Anna) Walters
- Barbara Mayer Wertheimer
- Myra Komaroff Wolfgang

=== Film ===
- Eve Arden
- Dorothy Arzner
- Pearl Bailey
- Lucille Ball
- Louise Brooks
- Mary Ellen Bute
- Theresa Hak Kyung Cha
- Shirley Clarke
- Joan Crawford
- Bette Davis
- Dolores Del Río
- Colleen Dewhurst
- Marlene Dietrich
- Ray Eames
- Greta Garbo
- Lillian Gish
- Frances Goodrich
- Ruth Gordon
- Rita Hayworth
- Edith Head
- Nora Kaye
- Anita Loos
- Ida Lupino
- Mary Martin
- Barbara McLean
- Thelma (Butterfly) McQueen
- Ruth Orkin
- Mary Pickford
- Molly Picon
- Ginger Rogers
- Esther Rolle
- Irene Sharaff
- Molly Spotted Elk
- Barbara Stanwyck
- Adela Rogers St. Johns
- Jessica Tandy
- Fredi Washington
- Ethel Waters
- Mae West

=== Food ===
- Joyce Chen
- Grace Zia Chu
- M.F.K. (Mary Frances Kennedy) Fisher

=== Gardening ===
- Katharine White

=== Government: Appointed Officials (State and Federal) ===
- Daisy Lee Gatson Bates
- Leona Baumgartner
- Clara Mortenson Beyer
- Rose Elizabeth Bird
- Alice Bourneuf
- Ruth Muskrat Bronson
- Eveline M. Burns
- Georgia Neese Clark
- Jacqueline Cochran
- Ruth Baldwin Cowan
- Eleanor Lansing Dulles
- Catherine East
- Martha May Eliot
- Millicent Fenwick
- Dorothy Fosdick
- Betty Furness
- Martha Gellhorn
- Joy Bright Hancock
- Pamela Harriman
- Patricia Roberts Harris
- Anna Arnold Hedgeman
- Helen Heffernan
- Margaret Ann Hickey
- Oveta Culp Hobby
- Mildred McAfee Horton
- Lucy Somerville Howorth
- Mary Dublin Keyserling
- Elizabeth Duncan Koontz
- Lucile Petry Leone
- Clare Boothe Luce
- Marion Ella Martin
- Graciela Olivarez
- Esther Peterson
- Marguerite Rawalt
- Dixy Lee Ray
- Mina S. Rees
- Margaret Gilpin Reid
- Josephine Roche
- Anna Marie Lederer Rosenberg
- Nellie Tayloe Ross
- Edith Spurlock Sampson
- Gay Bolling Shepperson
- Hilda Worthington Smith
- Mary Louise Smith
- Hazel Katherine Stiebeling
- Lois Hayden Meek Stolz
- Anna Lord Strauss
- Ruth Cheney Streeter
- Louise Thaden
- Marietta Tree
- Ruth Murray Underhill
- Phyllis Ann Wallace
- Caroline Farrar Ware
- Katharine Way
- Aryness Joy Wickens
- Ellen Black Winston
- Elizabeth Wood

=== History ===
- Amelia Agostini de del Río
- Pilar Barbosa de Rosario
- Margarete Bieber
- Ruth Harriet Bleier
- Fawn McKay Brodie
- Letitia Woods Brown
- Lucy S. Dawidowicz
- Angie Elbertha Debo
- Eleanor Flexner
- Joan Kelly
- Mary Pukui
- Barbara Wertheim Tuchman
- Caroline Farrar Ware
- Barbara Mayer Wertheimer
- Dorothy Porter Wesley

=== Home Economics ===
See Nutrition

=== Housing Reform ===
- Elisabeth Coit
- Helen Hall
- Elizabeth Wood
- International Affairs
- Clara Mortenson Beyer
- Frances Payne Bingham Bolton
- Alice Bourneuf
- Eleanor Lansing Dulles
- Dorothy Fosdick
- Pauline Frederick
- Pamela Harriman
- Patricia Roberts Harris
- Esther Lape
- Kathleen (Katie) Louchheim
- Clare Boothe Luce
- Edith Spurlock Sampson
- Anna Lord Strauss
- Marietta Tree
- Caroline Farrar Ware

=== Journalism ===
- Donna Allen
- Djuna Barnes
- Daisy Lee Gatson Bates
- Doris E. Fleischman Bernays
- Mary Clifford Caperton Bingham
- Erma Bombeck
- Emma Bugbee
- Dorothy Buffum Chandler
- Ruth Baldwin Cowan
- Charlotte Murray Curtis
- Dorothy May Day
- Peggy Dennis
- Nancy Dickerson
- Alice Allison Dunnigan
- India Edwards
- Margaret Farrar
- Janet Flanner
- Francisca Flores
- Pauline Frederick
- Betty Furness
- Hazel Garland
- Martha Gellhorn
- Mary Ellen (Meg) Greenfield
- Margaret Ann Hickey
- Oveta Culp Hobby
- Freda Kirchwey
- Irene Corbally Kuhn
- Rose Kushner
- Suzanne La Follette
- Louise Leung Larson
- Jane Kwong Lee
- Mary Margaret McBride
- Jessie Lloyd O'Connor
- Ruth Orkin
- Ethel L. Payne
- Sylvia Porter
- Ruth Ross
- Martha Rountree
- Julia Evelyn Ruuttila
- Dorothy Schiff
- Sigrid Lillian Schultz
- Hazel Brannon Smith
- Adela Rogers St. Johns
- Trude Weiss-Rosmarin
- Dorothy West
- Ruth Whitney
- Nancy Woodhull

=== Labor ===
- Frances Mary Albrier
- Donna Allen
- Clara Mortenson Beyer
- Alice Hanson Cook
- Helen Lake Kanahele
- Myrtle Terry Lawrence
- Sue Ko Lee
- Olga Marie Madar
- Jennie Matyas
- Luisa Moreno
- Pauline Newman
- Rose Finkelstein Norwood
- Esther Peterson
- Josephine Roche
- Anna Marie Lederer Rosenberg
- Julia Evelyn Ruuttila
- Clara Lemlich Shavelson
- Hilda Worthington Smith
- Emma Tenayuca
- Vera Buch Weisbord
- Barbara Mayer Wertheimer
- Myra Komaroff Wolfgang
- Elaine Black Yoneda

=== Law and Judiciary ===
- Bella Abzug
- Sadie Tanner Mossell Alexander
- Barbara Nachtrieb Armstrong
- Rose Elizabeth Bird
- Patricia Roberts Harris
- Margaret Ann Hickey
- Lucy Somerville Howorth
- Barbara Jordan
- Burnita Shelton Matthews
- Soia Mentschikoff
- Anna Pauline (Pauli) Murray
- Graciela Olivarez
- Alice Paul
- Harriet Fleischl Pilpel
- Justine Wise Polier
- Marguerite Rawalt
- Edith Spurlock Sampson

=== Librarians/Archivists ===
- Augusta Baker
- Margaret Storrs Grierson
- Virginia Haviland
- Dorothy Porter Wesley

=== Mathematics/Statistics/Computer Science ===
- Marjorie Lee Browne
- Grace Murray Hopper
- Mina S. Rees
- Julia B. Robinson
- Olga Taussky-Todd
- Aryness Joy Wickens
- Dorothy Maud Wrinch

=== Medicine: Physicians and Health Care Activists ===
- Barbara Nachtrieb Armstrong
- Ruth Harriet Bleier
- Hilde Bruch
- Mary Steichen Calderone
- May Edward Chinn
- Mamie Phipps Clark
- Martha May Eliot
- Dorothy Boulding Ferebee
- Harriet Louise Hardy
- Edith Banfield Jackson
- Esther Lape
- Mary Woodard Reinhardt Lasker
- Onnie Lee Rodgers Logan
- Helen Brooke Taussig
- Kazue Togasaki
- Annie Dodge Wauneka

=== Military ===
- Jacqueline Cochran
- Joy Bright Hancock
- Oveta Culp Hobby
- Grace Murray Hopper
- Mildred McAfee Horton
- Lucile Petry Leone
- Nancy Harkness Love
- Ruth Cheney Streeter

=== Museums/Curators ===
- Agnes Mongan
- Marjorie Acker Phillips
- Tatiana Proskouriakoff
- Diana Vreeland
- Hannah Marie Wormington

=== Music: Classical ===
- Marian Anderson
- Antonia Louisa Brico
- Maria Callas
- Jan DeGaetani
- Miriam Gideon
- Shirley Graham Du Bois
- Margaret Hillis
- Lotte Lenya
- Dorothy Maynor
- Rosa Ponselle
- Catherine Filene Shouse
- Louise Talma
- Elinor Remick Warren

=== Music: Popular ===
- Pearl Bailey
- Maybelle Addington Carter
- Elizabeth (Libba) Cotten
- Ella Fitzgerald
- Florence Greenberg
- Alberta Hunter
- Sylvia Fine Kaye
- Melba Liston
- Ethel Merman
- Laura Nyro
- Minnie Pearl
- Selena
- Dinah Shore
- Kate Smith
- Victoria Regina Spivey
- Willie Mae Thornton
- Sarah Vaughan
- Ethel Waters
- Mary Lou Williams
- Tammy Wynette

=== Nursing ===
- Frances Payne Bingham Bolton
- Wilma Scott Heide
- Lucile Petry Leone
- Estelle Massey Riddle Osborne
- Hildegard E. Peplau
- Mabel Doyle Keaton Staupers

=== Nutrition/Home Economics ===
- Icie Gertrude Macy Hoobler
- Flemmie Pansy Kittrell
- Margaret Gilpin Reid
- Hazel Katherine Stiebeling

=== Peace ===
- Bella Abzug
- Donna Allen
- Dorothy May Day
- Barbara Deming
- Dorothy Detzer
- Fay Honey Knopp
- Aki Kurose
- Esther Lape
- Florence Luscomb
- Bertha Clay McNeill
- Mildred Scott Olmsted
- Mildred Norman (Peace Pilgrim) Ryder

=== Penology and Criminology ===
- Fay Honey Knopp

=== Philanthropy ===
- Mary Clifford Caperton Bingham
- Frances Payne Bingham Bolton
- Dorothy Buffum Chandler
- Dominique De Menil
- Bette Clair McMurray Nesmith Graham
- Pamela Harriman
- Mary Woodard Reinhardt Lasker
- Katharine Ordway
- Marjorie Acker Phillips
- Catherine Filene Shouse
- Edith Rosenwald Stern
- Lila Bell Acheson Wallace

=== Philosophy ===
- Susanne K. Langer
- Helen Merrell Lynd
- Ayn Rand

=== Photography ===
- Berenice Abbott
- Imogen Cunningham
- Louise Dahl-Wolfe
- Laura Gilpin
- Ruth Orkin
- Marion Post Wolcott

=== Physics ===
- Katharine Burr Blodgett
- Gertrude Scharff Goldhaber
- Leona Woods Marshall Libby
- Edith Hinkley Quimby
- Katharine Way
- Chien-Shiung Wu

=== Political Science ===
- Pilar Barbosa de Rosario
- Kathryn (Kay) Frederick Clarenbach

=== Politics: Elected Officials/Activists/Volunteers ===
- Bella Abzug
- Frances Payne Bingham Bolton
- Helen Gahagan Douglas
- India Edwards
- Millicent Fenwick
- Dorothy Fosdick
- Ella Tambussi Grasso
- Edith Green
- Fannie Lou Hamer
- Grace Towns Hamilton
- Lucy Somerville Howorth
- Barbara Jordan
- Coya Gjesdal Knutson
- Alice Roosevelt Longworth
- Kathleen (Katie) Louchheim
- Clare Boothe Luce
- Marion Ella Martin
- Jacqueline Lee Bouvier Kennedy Onassis
- Dixy Lee Ray
- Felisa Rincón de Gautier
- Nellie Tayloe Ross
- Maria Clemencia Colón Sánchez
- Catherine Filene Shouse
- Margaret Chase Smith
- Mary Louise Smith
- Marietta Tree

=== Psychiatry/Psychoanalysis/Psychiatric Social Work ===
- Therese F. Benedek
- Hilde Bruch
- Helene Deutsch
- Selma Fraiberg
- Phyllis Greenacre
- Edith Banfield Jackson
- Marion Edwena Kenworthy
- Margaret Mahler
- Hildegard E. Peplau
- Bertha Capen Reynolds

=== Psychology ===
- Theodora Mead Abel
- Mary Dinsmore Salter Ainsworth
- Louise Bates Ames
- Jeanne Sternlicht Chall
- Mamie Phipps Clark
- Susan Walton Gray
- Evelyn Hooker
- Mary Cover Jones
- Katharine McBride
- Emily Hartshorne Mudd
- Margaret Jeannette Naumburg
- Carolyn Wood Sherif
- Lois Hayden Meek Stolz
- Sister Annette Walters
- Cynthia Clark Wedel

=== Public Health/Women's Health ===
- Leona Baumgartner
- Mary Steichen Calderone
- Dorothy Boulding Ferebee
- Harriet Louise Hardy
- Rose Kushner
- Onnie Lee Rodgers Logan
- Emily Hartshorne Mudd
- Esther Rome
- Annie Dodge Wauneka

=== Publishing/Editing ===
- Harriet Stratemeyer Adams
- Virginia (Toni) Carabillo
- Amy Clampitt
- Margaret Farrar
- Martha Foley
- Freda Kirchwey
- Suzanne La Follette
- Ursula Nordstrom
- Jacqueline Lee Bouvier Kennedy Onassis
- Ruth Ross
- Diana Vreeland
- Lila Bell Acheson Wallace
- Trude Weiss-Rosmarin
- Katharine White
- Ruth Whitney
- Helen Wolff
- Nancy Woodhull

=== Radicalism/Socialism ===
- Dorothy May Day
- Angie Elbertha Debo
- Barbara Deming
- Peggy Dennis
- Josefina Fierro
- Eleanor Flexner
- Margaret Eliza (Maggie) Kuhn
- Meridel Le Sueur
- Katharine Du Pre Lumpkin
- Florence Luscomb
- Gloria Martin
- Jessica Mitford
- Jessie Lloyd O'Connor
- Louise Alone Thompson Patterson
- Bertha Capen Reynolds
- Muriel Rukeyser
- Julia Evelyn Ruuttila
- Clara Lemlich Shavelson
- Valerie Solanas
- Emma Tenayuca
- Vera Buch Weisbord
- Elaine Black Yoneda

=== Radio/Television ===
- Eve Arden
- Lucille Ball
- Erma Bombeck
- Colleen Dewhurst
- Nancy Dickerson
- Pauline Frederick
- Betty Furness
- Anne Hummert
- Lucille Kallen
- Sylvia Fine Kaye
- Mary Livingstone
- Ida Lupino
- Mary Martin
- Mary Margaret McBride
- Thelma (Butterfly) McQueen
- Ethel L. Payne
- Minnie Pearl
- Gilda Radner
- Ginger Rogers
- Esther Rolle
- Martha Rountree
- Dinah Shore
- Kate Smith
- Barbara Stanwyck
- Kim Williams

=== Religion/Spirituality ===
- Thea Bowman
- Dorothy May Day
- Corita Kent
- Kathryn Johanna Kuhlman
- Catherine Marshall
- Elizabeth Morrissy
- Nelle Katharine Morton
- Anna Pauline (Pauli) Murray
- Madalyn Murray O'Hair
- Essie Parrish
- Jeannette Ridlon Piccard
- Mildred Norman (Peace Pilgrim) Ryder
- Sister Annette Walters
- Cynthia Clark Wedel
- Trude Weiss-Rosmarin

=== Social Work ===
- Helen Hall
- Marion Edwena Kenworthy
- Jane Kwong Lee
- Mildred Scott Olmsted
- Bertha Capen Reynolds
- Josephine Roche
- Gay Bolling Shepperson

=== Socialite/Hostess ===
- Pamela Harriman
- Alice Roosevelt Longworth
- Marietta Tree

=== Sociology ===
- Jessie Shirley Bernard
- Mirra Komarovsky
- Helen Merrell Lynd
- Ellen Black Winston

=== Sports/Physical Education/Recreation ===
- Dorothy Sears Ainsworth[2]
- Florence May Chadwick
- Glenna Collett
- Alice Greenough
- Florence Griffith Joyner
- Margaret Newell H'Doubler
- Effa Manley
- Helen Wills Moody
- Wilma Rudolph
- Miriam O'Brien Underhill
- Margaret Wade

=== Theater/Vaudeville/Comedy ===
- Kathy Acker
- Stella Adler
- Eve Arden
- Pearl Bailey
- Alice Childress
- Cheryl Crawford
- Agnes De Mille
- Colleen Dewhurst
- Helen Gahagan Douglas
- Angna Enters
- Lynn Fontanne
- Frances Goodrich
- Ruth Gordon
- Helen Hayes
- Lillian Hellman
- Sylvia Fine Kaye
- Eva Le Gallienne
- Lotte Lenya
- Anita Loos
- Clare Boothe Luce
- Mary Martin
- Ethel Merman
- Josefina Niggli
- Molly Picon
- Gilda Radner
- Ginger Rogers
- Esther Rolle
- Irene Sharaff
- Molly Spotted Elk
- Jessica Tandy
- Te Ata
- Estela Portillo Trambley
- Fredi Washington
- Ethel Waters
- Mae West

Women's Health. See Public Health

=== Women's Organizations ===
==== American Association of University Women ====
- Eveline M. Burns
- Dorothy Boulding Ferebee
- Lois Hayden Meek Stolz
- Caroline Farrar Ware

==== Coalition of Labor Union Women ====
- Olga Marie Madar
- Barbara Mayer Wertheimer
- Myra Komaroff Wolfgang

==== League of Women Voters ====
- Kathryn (Kay) Frederick Clarenbach
- Ella Tambussi Grasso
- Edith Green
- Wilma Scott Heide
- Oveta Culp Hobby
- Esther Lape
- Anna Lord Strauss
- Ruth Cheney Streeter
- Caroline Farrar Ware

==== National Consumers' League ====
- Clara Mortenson Beyer
- Eveline M. Burns
- Mary Dublin Keyserling
- Josephine Roche

==== National Council of Negro Women ====
- Frances Mary Albrier
- Dorothy Boulding Ferebee
- Marjorie Stewart Joyner
- Thelma (Butterfly) McQueen
- Edith Spurlock Sampson

==== National Federation of Business and Professional Women ====
- Edith Green
- Margaret Ann Hickey
- Margaret Chase Smith

==== National Organization for Women ====
- Donna Allen
- Virginia (Toni) Carabillo
- Kathryn (Kay) Frederick Clarenbach
- Catherine East
- Wilma Scott Heide
- Anna Pauline (Pauli) Murray
- Marguerite Rawalt
- Tish Sommers
- Barbara Mayer Wertheimer

==== National Woman's Party ====
- Burnita Shelton Matthews
- Alice Paul
- Marguerite Rawalt

==== National Women's Political Caucus ====
- Bella Abzug
- Donna Allen
- Kathryn (Kay) Frederick Clarenbach
- Olga Marie Madar

==== Planned Parenthood Federation of America ====
- Mary Steichen Calderone
- Estelle Trebert Griswold
- Mary Woodard Reinhardt Lasker
- Harriet Fleischl Pilpel
- Mary Louise Smith
- Women's Equity Action League
- Jessie Shirley Bernard
- Olga Marie Madar
- Marguerite Rawalt

==== Women's International League for Peace and Freedom ====
- Donna Allen
- Dorothy Detzer
- Freda Kirchwey
- Florence Luscomb
- Bertha Clay McNeill
- Jessie Lloyd O'Connor
- Mildred Scott Olmsted

==== Women Strike for Peace ====
- Bella Abzug
- Donna Allen
- Fay Honey Knopp

==== Women's Trade Union League ====
- Pauline Newman
- Rose Finkelstein Norwood

==== Young Women's Christian Association ====
- Ella Baker
- Ruth Muskrat Bronson
- Alice Hanson Cook
- Marion Vera Cuthbert
- Dorothy Boulding Ferebee
- Hazel Garland
- Helen Hall
- Grace Towns Hamilton
- Patricia Roberts Harris
- Anna Arnold Hedgeman
- Margaret Ann Hickey
- Lucy Somerville Howorth
- Ruby Hurley
- Margaret Eliza (Maggie) Kuhn
- Jane Kwong Lee
- Katharine Du Pre Lumpkin
- Mollie Hong Min
- Esther Peterson
- Lila Bell Acheson Wallace

==== Other ====
- Marion Vera Cuthbert
- Dorothy Boulding Ferebee
- Anna Arnold Hedgeman
- Caroline Farrar Ware
- Cynthia Clark Wedel

=== Writers/Poets ===
- Kathy Acker
- Amelia Agostini de del Río
- Harriette Simpson Arnow
- Toni Cade Bambara
- Djuna Barnes
- Gwendolyn Bennett
- Elizabeth Bishop
- Erma Bombeck
- Kay Boyle
- Sarah Patton Boyle
- Fawn McKay Brodie
- Louise Brooks
- Lydia Cabrera
- Lourdes Casal
- Theresa Hak Kyung Cha
- Alice Childress
- Amy Clampitt
- Elizabeth Jane Coatsworth
- Lucy S. Dawidowicz
- Barbara Deming
- Marjory Stoneman Douglas
- M.F.K. Fisher / Mary Frances Kennedy Fisher
- Janet Flanner
- Martha Gellhorn
- Shirley Graham Du Bois
- Lillian Hellman
- Jane Kenyon
- Meridel Le Sueur
- Denise Levertov
- Onnie Lee Rodgers Logan
- Anita Loos
- Audre Lorde
- Katharine Du Pre Lumpkin
- Catherine Marshall
- Mary McCarthy
- Jessica Mitford
- Anna Pauline (Pauli) Murray
- Helen Knothe Nearing
- Josefina Niggli
- Anaïs Nin
- Ann Petry
- Katherine Anne Porter
- Polingaysi Qoyawayma
- Ayn Rand
- Muriel Rukeyser
- May Sarton
- Helen Sekaquaptewa
- Jean Stafford
- May Swenson
- Mary TallMountain
- Teiko Tomita
- Estela Portillo Trambley
- Diana Rubin Trilling
- Barbara Wertheim Tuchman
- Yoshiko Uchida
- Margaret Walker
- Michi Nishiura Weglyn
- Dorothy West
- Kim Williams

=== Zoology ===
- Dian Fossey
- Jane Marion Oppenheimer

== Bibliography ==
- Notable American Women: a biographical dictionary completing the twentieth century. (2004). Ware, Susan (editor), Stacy Braukman, assistant editor. Belknap Press of Harvard University Press: Cambridge, Mass. ISBN 067401488X.
