= Anna Lord Strauss =

Influential civic leader and mainly a feminist and a women's rights activist

- Born: September 20, 1899; New York City, New York
- Died: February 23, 1979
- Occupation: Women's Rights Activist
- Known for: Presidency of the League of Women Voters (1944-1950), leadership in the formation of the United Nations

Anna Lord Strauss (1899–1979) was an influential civic leader who was mainly a feminist and a women's rights activist. Perhaps one of her greatest accomplishments was her push for the creation of the United Nations. She was also recognized widely and appointed to certain positions for her ability to work effectively with women of many different cultures and backgrounds.

== Biography ==
A part of the Famine Emergency Committee, the International Alliance for Women, and the League of Women Voters, Anna Lord Strauss significantly influenced American history. She was born in New York City in 1899 and was brought up with two other siblings. After going to the New York School for Secretaries and getting a job alongside her father, she took a trip to France which ultimately made her contemplate what she really wanted to do with her life. In 1923, she got a job with the Century Magazine, but after six years left because she felt her promotion was taking a job away from someone more deserving. She took up volunteer work at Ellis Island, and eventually joined the New York City League of Women Voters in 1934. Determined and hard-working, Strauss moved up in the organization to president. Her election, however, led to the resignation of the senior board members and staff because the outgoing presidential candidate was apparently a big-shot and they did not want to give Strauss a chance. To combat the loss of members, she hired plenty of excited new people who shared similar stances.

== Accomplishments ==
The League of Women Voters was an important organization that brought women's voices to Congress and the White House. Strauss used her leadership in the League to advocate for world peace and for the creation of the United Nations. Strauss was a presidential appointee to the U.S. Delegation to the United Nations (1951-1952), she directed the American Association for the UN, and was a member of the U.S. Committee for the UN, the UN Association of the US, and the Committee of Correspondence, N.Y.C. Strauss stressed that the success of the formation of the United Nations was based “on the understanding and support of the peoples of the world and on their determination to make it work… The inevitable differences among nations must not divert the American peoples from the solution of our international problems, which demands a United Nations organization”.

In the 1940s during Strauss' presidency, the League of Women Voters underwent major changes, including its title. The name was changed to the “League of Women Voters of the United States” to encourage nationwide participation. It was constructed in a way such that members joined by enrolling in leagues in their local communities. This greatly expanded the numbers, making the local Leagues the “basis and organization and representation in the League” Led by Strauss, the League of Women Voters created the Carrie Chapman Catt Memorial Fund (CCCMF) to honor “the memory of a great leader.” The CCCMF had the idea for a Freedom Agenda Program to fight the fear caused by current rigidities through the understanding of our constitutional freedoms. As president of the CCCMF, Strauss had the power to choose the members for the National Freedom Agenda committee.

Strauss was inspirational for many because she managed to turn her voluntary work into a major career in public service. Connecticut College has a scholarship award named in Strauss’ honor that is given annually to a senior who has completed a great amount of community service.
