= Emily Wayland Dinwiddie =

American social worker, housing reformer, and advocate for children's welfare

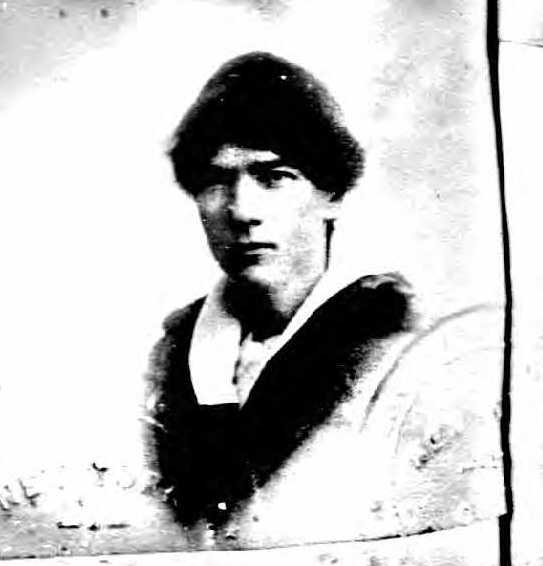
- Born: August 14, 1879; Virginia, United States
- Died: March 11, 1949 (aged 69); Waynesboro, Virginia, United States
- Education: Peace Institute; New York Charity Organization Society's Summer School; University of Pennsylvania
- Occupations: Social worker, housing reformer
- Known for: Housing reform, social work, and child welfare
- Notable work: "The Tenants' Manual: A Handbook of Information for Dwellers in Tenement and Apartment Houses and for Settlement and Other Workers" (1903), "Virginia State Hospitals for Mental Patients" (1934)
- Parent(s): William Dinwiddie, Emily Albertine Bledsoe Dinwiddie

Emily Wayland Dinwiddie (August 14, 1879 — March 11, 1949) was an American social worker, housing reformer, and advocate for children's welfare.

== Early life ==
Dinwiddie was born on August 14, 1879.

== Career ==
=== Tenement reform and housing conditions ===
Dinwiddie's reports on tenement housing conditions highlighted the significance of public health and sanitation, concentrating on factors that led to the proliferation of illnesses such as tuberculosis and typhoid. Dinwiddie investigated housing conditions in various cities, resulting in publications like "Housing Conditions in Philadelphia" (1904) and contributing to the influential 1907-1908 Pittsburgh Survey.

In 1909, Trinity Episcopal Church, under criticism for the poor state of its tenements, hired Dinwiddie to inspect their properties. After conducting an in-depth investigation and suggesting reforms, she was appointed supervisor of the church's tenements in 1910.

=== Emergency Relief Administration ===
From 1936 until her retirement in 1938, Dinwiddie held the position of assistant superintendent of relief for the state.

Throughout her professional life, Dinwiddie advocated for a blend of extensive government services and individual family casework investigations. She stressed the importance of churches in fostering the development of children's character and advocated the significance of Christianity in addressing the hardships faced by children.

== Major works ==
- "The Tenants' Manual: A Handbook of Information for Dwellers in Tenement and Apartment Houses and for Settlement and Other Workers" (1903)
- "Virginia State Hospitals for Mental Patients" (1934)
