= Alice Higgins Lothrop =

American social worker (1870–1920)

- Born: Alice Louise Higgins; March 28, 1870; Boston, Massachusetts
- Died: September 2, 1920 (aged 50); Newtonville, Massachusetts
- Occupation: Social worker

Alice Higgins Lothrop (1870–1920) was an American social worker who was one of the founders of the Association of Societies for Organizing Charity.

Lothrop née Higgins was born in Boston, Massachusetts, on March 28, 1870. She volunteered at the Boston Children's Aid Society and then worked at the Associated Charities of Boston.

In 1910 Lothrop helped found the National Association of Societies for Organizing Charity (now the Family Welfare Association of America) and was the first chairperson.

Lothrop was an advocate of the use of case histories in social work and, eventually, believed in the importance of integrated medical care as part of social work. From 1904 through 1920 she was a lecturer at the Boston School for Social Workers, a program begun in 1904 by Harvard University and Simmons College

In 1913 she married William Howard Lothrop and subsequently resigned from the Associated Charities of Boston.

Lothrop died in Newtonville, Massachusetts on September 2, 1920.
