= Helen Ira Jarrell =

American educator and labour leader

- Born: July 27, 1896; Meriwether County
- Died: August 27, 1973; Little Rock
- Alma mater: Oglethorpe University
- Occupation(s): Teacher and labour leader

Helen Ira Jarrell (July 27, 1896 - August 27, 1973) also known as Ira Jarrell was an American educator and labour leader.

== Career ==
Jarrell was hired as an elementary school teacher in Atlanta, Georgia. In 1934, she became the principal of the school she was employed at. She became superintendent of the Atlanta school district in 1944.
