= Elizabeth Peck Perkins =

American shipping magnate

Elizabeth Peck Perkins (1735–1807) was an American shipping magnate.

She was the daughter of the fur merchant Thomas Handasyd Peck, wife of the merchant James Perkins (1733–1773) and mother of the Boston Brahmin Thomas Handasyd Perkins. She managed the shipping and merchant company of her dead husband, one of the leading companies of Boston, from 1773. During the American Revolutionary War, she participated in shipping troops for the American ally France. In 1800, she was one of the co-founders and financiers of the Boston Female Asylum, the first institution founded by women in Boston, and functioned as its first manager and treasurer.
