= Connie Boucher =

American businesswoman (1923–1995)

- Born: 15 July 1923; Seattle, Washington
- Died: 20 December 1995 (aged 72); San Francisco, California
- Occupations: Merchandising; Business

Connie Boucher (15 July 1923 – 20 December 1995) was an American businesswoman and pioneer in character merchandising, known for her work with the Peanuts comic strip. She also inspired the best-selling book Happiness Is a Warm Puppy (1962). Boucher founded Determined Productions, a company focused on character merchandising.

== Early life ==
Born on 15 July 1923 in Seattle and attended the Chouinard Art School in Los Angeles. In 1961, she established Determined Productions in San Francisco.

== Career ==
Boucher founded Determined Productions, a company focused on character merchandising, in the mid-20th century. She collaborated with Peanuts creator Charles M. Schulz, suggesting the concept for Happiness Is a Warm Puppy after seeing a strip where Charlie Brown says, "Happiness is a warm puppy."

Her company facilitated the licensing of Peanuts characters for toys, gifts, and other products, revolutionising character merchandising.

In 1990, Determined Productions underwrote a Louvre exhibition celebrating 40 years of Snoopy, highlighting Boucher's influence in elevating Peanuts to a global brand.

== Personal life ==
Boucher was married to Jim Young and had two sons, Douglas Boucher of Belvedere and Theodore Boucher of Davis, as well as a sister, June Dutton of Sausalito.

== Death ==
Connie Boucher died on 20 December 1995 in San Francisco, California, at the age of 72, due to complications following heart surgery.
