= Ethel Perrin =

Ethel Perrin (February 7, 1871 - May 15, 1962) was an early American physical educator.

Ethel Perrin taught at the Boston Normal School of Gymnastics and was later the first female vice president at the American Physical Education Association. Perrin received an honor award from American Association of Health, Physical Education, and Recreation in 1931; and Perrin was awarded the Luther Halsey Gulick Award in 1946 for her "outstanding contribution to physical education in our public schools"

Perrin believed that women were limited athletically in their physical potential, arguing that strenuous activity was harmful to women's health. She opposed the equal rights sports movement.
