= Evelyn Walton Ordway =

American chemist, college professor and suffragist

- Born: Evelyn M. Walton; 30 January 1853; Massachusetts, U.S.A
- Died: 9 March 1928 (aged 75)
- Occupation: college professor
- Known for: Professor of Chemistry and Physics at Newcomb College, president of the Louisiana State Suffrage Association

Evelyn Walton Ordway (30 January 1853 – 9 March 1928) was an American chemist, suffragist and university professor at Newcomb College in New Orleans. She was a chemistry and physics professor at Newcomb College for seven years and was active in the Louisiana women's suffrage movement, becoming the first president of the Louisiana State Suffrage Association.

== Biography ==
Evelyn M. Walton was born on 30 January 1853 to Sarah Elizabeth Davis and her husband John Burrill Walton. She studied at Massachusetts Institute of Technology (MIT) and earned a Bachelor of Science degree in 1881. While at MIT, she published a paper on her research that was discussed in the Annual Reports of the Smithsonian. She was later appointed as an assistant at MIT. After her marriage in 1882 she was employed as the Professor of Chemistry and Physics at Newcomb College, the women's college associated with Tulane University. She served in that position from 1887 to 1904 after which she was appointed as the professor of chemistry at Newcomb, a post she held until 1905. During her time at Newcomb College she was not paid. She had built the science curriculum of Newcomb College, it was built enough that by 1889, when Newcomb College was planning its move to the Washington Ave Campus, they planned to include a whole science building. Although a separate science building was not built. However in The Academy, the high school part of Newcomb, a whole floor was given for Ordway's laboratories.

Ordway was a member of the American Association of University Women, and in March 1883 delivered a paper to that organization on the Industrial Education of Women. At the World Cotton Centennial in 1884, Ordway organized a collective exhibit of the scientific work conducted by women in botany, mineralogy, entomology, astronomy, chemistry, zoology, architecture, and ethnology.

In 1892, Ordway became involved with the Louisiana women's suffrage movement. She helped form the women's suffrage club The Portia and was appointed the club's treasurer, with Caroline E. Merrick being appointed president. Two years later, Ordway attended the 26th Annual Convention of the National American Woman Suffrage Association in Washington, D.C. There, she discussed The Portia, a suffrage club gaining popularity in Louisiana, along with the benefits that suffrage would afford to the women of Louisiana should they gain the vote. One of her success is how her effort allow women to vote on The Drainage, Sewerage and Water Campaign of 1899, in which a third of the electorate was women. It is believed this measure would not passed without the women voters. In 1896, Ordway founded the Era Club. This club merged with the Portia Club in 1900 and Ordway became the first president of the resulting Louisiana State Suffrage Association. She published a writing in 1900 called "How the Women of New Orleans Discovered Their Wish to Vote". She continued to work closely with Kate M. Gordon, who would later succeed her as president of the Association.

By 1900, Ordway was also the president of Women's Branch Alliance, Unitarian Church, as well as the secretary of the board of the New Orleans Free Kindergarten Association. Ordway was active in campaigning for women's suffrage and gave lectures including one at the Free Church of the Annunciation in New Orleans in 1901. She also wrote articles documenting the history of the suffrage movement in New Orleans.

She retired from her position as professor of chemistry in 1905 and, after the death of her husband in 1909, moved first to Saugus, Massachusetts, and then Lynn, Massachusetts.

== Private life ==
Ordway married Professor John Morse Ordway in 1882. She died on 9 March 1928.
