= Sarah Mayo =

Sarah Mayo may refer to:

- Sarah Jim Mayo (1858–1918), Washoe basket weaver
- Sarah Carter Edgarton Mayo (1819–1848), American author and editor
- Sara T. Mayo (1869–1930), physician and humanitarian reformer
