= Era Club of New Orleans =

The Era Club of New Orleans was a woman's club in New Orleans, Louisiana. It was one of the largest woman's clubs in the southern United States. The club did charitable works, advocated for reform and for women's suffrage.

== History ==
The Era Club was founded in 1896 by Evelyn W. Ordway and was affiliated with the Portia Club. The name was really an acronym, standing for the "Equal Rights for All." The Era Club worked for women's suffrage in Louisiana and also towards improvements in education, sanitation and other civic matters. The club also raised money for charities and was involved in campaigning against child labor. The Era Club was also the only organization in New Orleans advocating for women's suffrage between 1900 and 1913.

== Notable members ==
- Elizabeth Bass
- Jean Gordon
- Kate M. Gordon, served as president
- Dr. Sara T. Mayo
- Evelyn Walton Ordway
