= Charles C. Bass =

American physician and researcher (1875–1975)

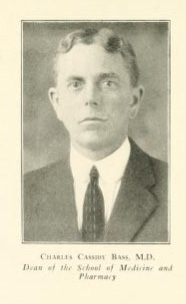
- Portrait of Bass in 1924
- Born: Charles Cassidy Bass; January 29, 1875; Carley, Mississippi, US
- Died: August 25, 1975 (aged 100); New Orleans, Louisiana, US
- Occupation: Physician-scientist
- Known for: The Bass Method of Brushing
- Medical career
- Institutions: Tulane University
- Research: Parasitology; Nutritional diseases; Preventative dentistry

Charles Cassidy Bass (January 29, 1875 – August 25 1975) was an American medical doctor and researcher on tropical medicine who made significant contributions to understanding malaria, hookworm, and other diseases. Later Bass studied the relationship between dental health and general well-being. Bass articulated and promoted the "Bass Technique of Toothbrushing" and developed improved means of flossing teeth, for which some refer to Bass as "The Father of Preventive Dentistry". He subsequently became a university administrator, serving as dean of the Tulane University School of Medicine, from 1922 to 1940.

== Contributions to tropical medicine ==
In 1911, Bass discovered an in vitro method of culturing the plasmodium organism responsible for malaria, a breakthrough in finding cures for the disease. He applied this method during a 1912 series of investigations into the cause of malaria during the Panama Canal project, a part of the efforts of Colonel William C. Gorgas to provide safe and hygienic conditions in the project.

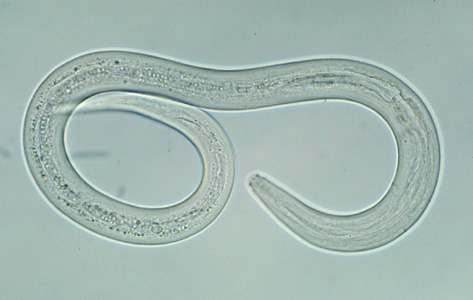
Hookworm organism

Around the same time, he succeeded in isolating the ova of the uncinaria, or hookworm, by isolating them in pure form from intestinal excreta. Additionally he contributed to the understanding of the vitamin diseases of beriberi and pellagra, being the first to recognize this disease in Louisiana. He simplified methods of diagnosing typhus, and discovered the cause and means of transmission of the poultry disease Ulcerative Enteritis. Much of Bass's early work in tropical medicine was conducted in collaboration with fellow Tulane University researcher Foster Johns.

== Contributions to dentistry and oral health ==
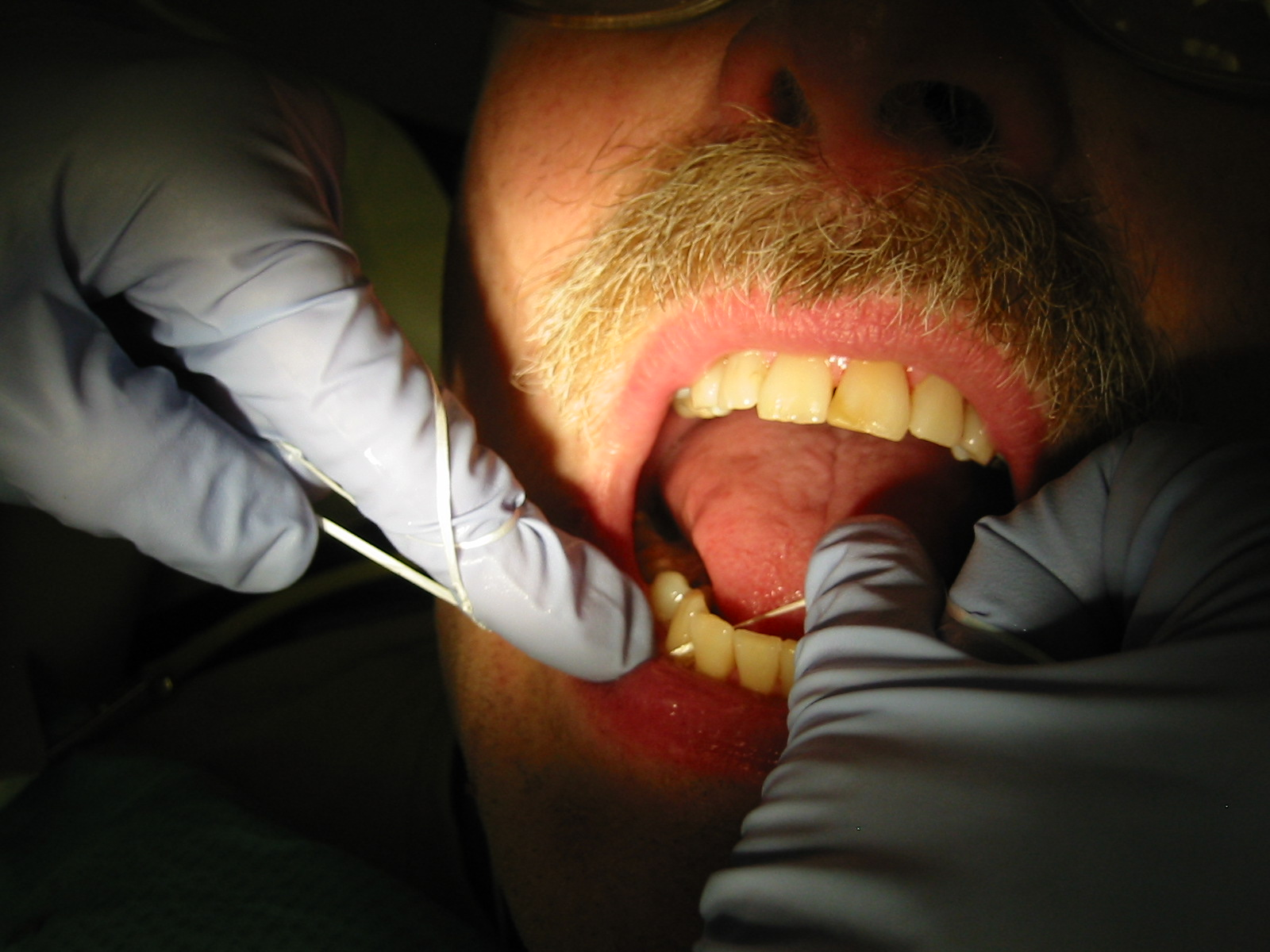
Dental flossing of a patient by a dental health professional

Beginning in 1914, Bass commenced his investigations on the understanding of Entamoeba gingivalis (Endameba buccalis) in the microbiological flora of the mouth, beginning his interest in oral health. However, it was only upon his 1940 retirement from university administrative posts that he began intensive research on dental health, a period in which he made extensive use of his experience in parasitology and microbiology. Bass focused on the understanding and prevention of the principle diseases of the mouth, particularly caries and periodontoclasia. Bass carried out extensive investigation and experimentation to determine the best means of using toothbrushes and dental floss for effective prevention of the important diseases of the mouth. Bass widely promoted means of improved oral hygiene, purposefully avoiding his own personal profit in the interest of public health.

Bass developed an improved material for dental floss, namely nylon rather than the previous silk.

== Academia ==
Bass was dean of the Tulane University School of Medicine from 1922 to 1940, a period of rapid expansion of the medical school and its facilities. This included the 1930 construction of new Hutchinson Clinics of medicine. His tenure included a tumultuous interaction with the administration of then Louisiana Governor Huey P. Long over the medical school's service of Charity Hospital (New Orleans). Bass eventually prevailed and established a teaching service at this large inner-city hospital.

Bass served as president of the Southern Medical Association in 1926.

== Personal life and early career ==
Bass was born on his family's pecan plantation in Carley, Mississippi, in Marion County, on January 29, 1875. He graduated from Tulane University School of Medicine in 1899 and initially practiced medicine in rural Mississippi. He developed a particular interest in Tropical Medicine after attending a 1903 meeting of the American Medical Association, held in New Orleans on the subject of hookworm. During the meeting, the consensus of opinion was that hookworm was new to the United States. From his experience practicing medicine in rural Mississippi, Bass knew this claim to be wrong. Shortly thereafter, Bass purchased a microscope for diagnostic purposes and conducted a study of children in his rural Mississippi medical practice. Within eight months, Bass determined that approximately 75 to 80 children in that locale suffered from hookworm.

To further his investigations into hookworm and other aspects of parasitology, Bass enrolled in a one year course of study at the Johns Hopkins University School of Medicine. During his studies there in 1904, he worked with Dr. Charles E. Simon and with Dr. William S. Thayer to develop his investigational skills.

On his return from his studies at Johns Hopkins University, Bass established a medical practice in New Orleans which included a self-financed research laboratory. He quickly gained the attention of investigators at Tulane University School of Medicine and so joined the faculty of Tulane University School of Medicine in 1905, initially as an unpaid investigator. In 1907, Bass became a salaried instructor at the medical school. rising through the academic ranks to eventually become dean.

Bass traveled to England in 1908 to further his investigational skills in the field of immunology through work with Dr. Almroth Wright. He continued to rise through the academic ranks, gaining the title of Professor of Experimental Medicine in 1912. He became a member of the American Association of Immunologists in 1916.

Bass died in New Orleans, in August 1975, at the age of 100.

Two of his sisters were physicians, Mary Elizabeth Bass and Cora Bass. Mary Elizabeth Bass also had a career in academic medicine, in pathology, and was the recipient of honors for her pioneering work in support of women's careers in medicine.

== Awards and recognition ==
Bronze doors commemorating Charles C. Bass were dedicated in Tulane University's Rudolph Matas Library in 1981. Among Bass's awards was a gold medal by the National Institute of Social Sciences for his contributions to the welfare of humankind. He was the 1967 recipient of an award from the Society for Preservation of Oral Health.

== Selected publication list ==
- "Habitat of Endameba buccalis in Lesions of Periodontoclasia", Proc. Soc. Exp. Bio. I Med. 66:9, 1947.
- "The Optimum Characteristics of Toothbrushes for Personal Oral Hygiene", Dent. Items. Int. 70:697, 1948.
- "The Optimum Characteristics of Dental Floss for Personal Oral Hygiene", Dent. Items. Int. 70:921, 1948.
- "Personal Oral Hygiene for Children", Arch. Pediatrics 72:295, 1955.
