= Southern States Woman Suffrage Conference =

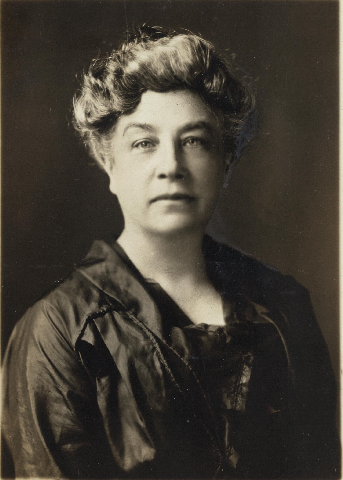
Kate M. Gordon, Leader of the Southern States Woman Suffrage Association

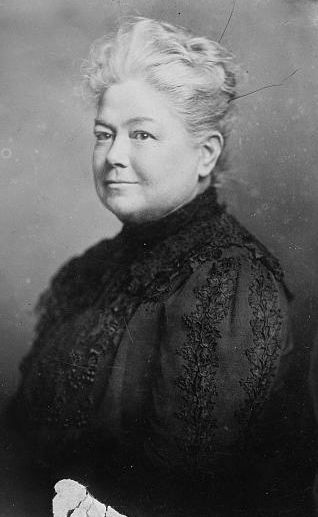
Laura Clay, Vice-President of SSWSA

The Southern States Woman Suffrage Conference (also known as the Southern States Woman Suffrage Association) was a group dedicated to winning voting rights for white women. The group consisted mainly of highly educated, middle and upper class white women of prominent families. They were originally part of the larger National American Woman Suffrage Association (NAWSA), but broke off in 1906. Prominent leaders in the group included Laura Clay and Kate Gordon, who supported and focused on local and state reforms rather than a national amendment. The group applied tactics like the Lost Cause, the belief that the Confederate cause was moral and just, and the Southern strategy, which appealed to white voters by promoting racism.

== Roots ==
In 1866, a group of former abolitionists formed the American Equal Rights Association, an organization working to win suffrage to all, regardless of race or sex. After three years, however, the group split over arguments with the ratification of the 14th and 15th Amendments. The Fourteenth Amendment (all persons born in the US were citizens and received Due Process) was ratified in 1868. This was followed by the 15th Amendment (black men could vote) in 1870. The ratification of these two Reconstruction-era amendments divided the woman suffragist movement. The Fourteenth and Fifteenth Amendment addressed racial equality but did not protect women's rights. Angered at the specific exclusion of women by expressing the rights of men in the 15th Amendment, former AERA members Elizabeth Cady Stanton and Susan B. Anthony formed the National Woman’s Suffrage Association (NWSA). The NWSA wanted to achieve the vote with a Constitutional amendment, and pressed the federal government with other women’s rights issues (unionization of female workers, marital rights). The American Woman Suffrage Association (AWSA), formed by Lucy Stone, wanted to achieve suffrage by reforming the local and state levels. Local suffrage also became the main tactic employed by the Southern States Women’s Suffrage Association in their “white only” movement.

== Formation of Southern States Women Suffrage Association ==
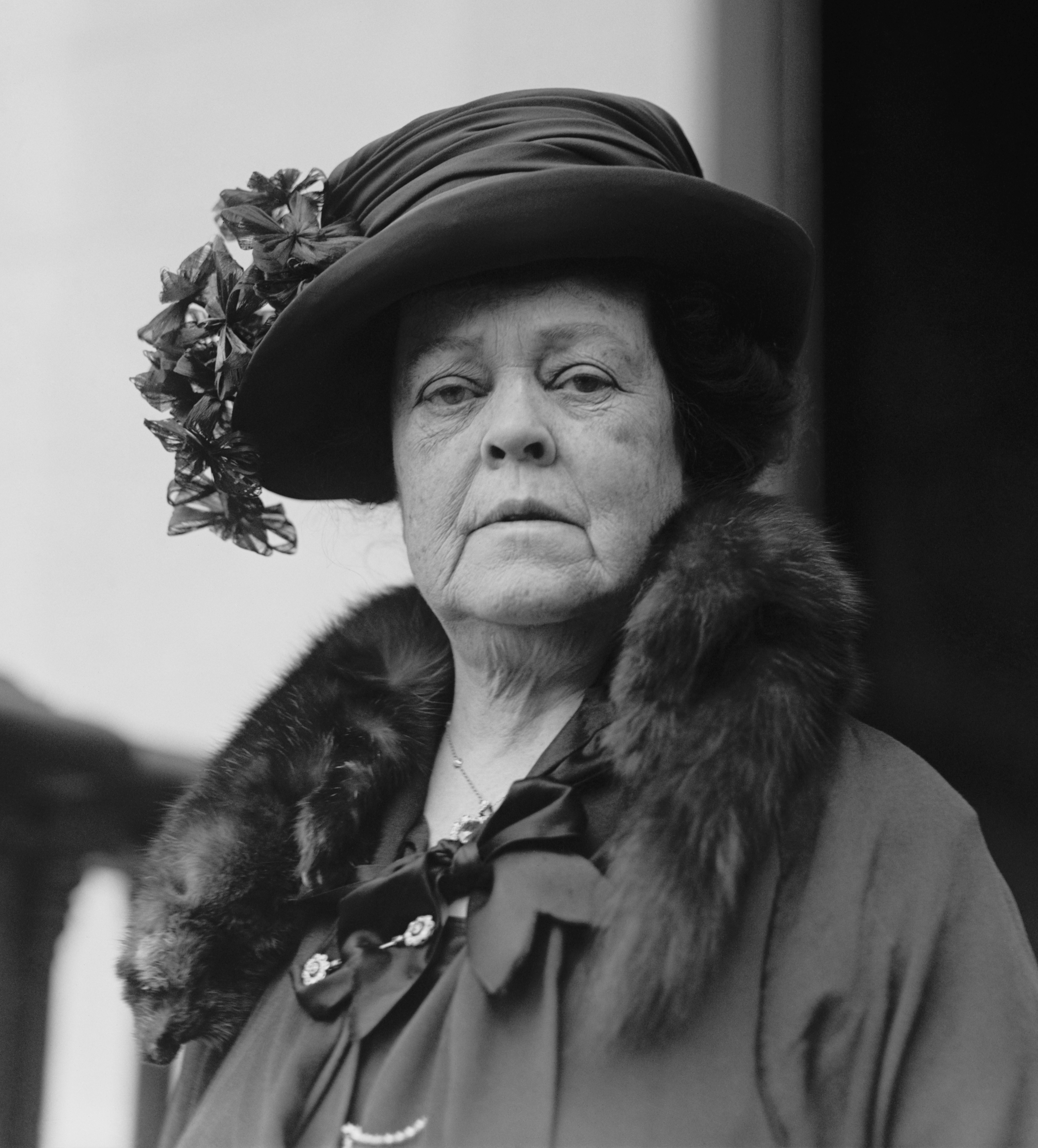
Mrs. Alva Belmont, a donor to both the CU and the SSWSA

The NWSA and AWSA had their own agendas until 1890, when they decided to reunite and form the National American Woman Suffrage Association (NAWSA). NAWSA worked for state-level amendments, hoping to eventually gain enough momentum for a national amendment. NAWSA was the first group to pioneer the Southern Strategy, convincing Southern political leaders that they could ensure white supremacy by enfranchising white women. At this time, women from the South were interspersed in groups like NAWSA, forming local chapters such as the Equal Suffrage League of Virginia. However, in the early 1900s, a uniquely Southern movement arose. Led by Kate Gordon of Louisiana (1861-1932), these upper class Southern women believed that state-level suffrage measures would help maintain white supremacy. One of Gordon's letters, published in Tennessee's The Journal and Tribune, said "I have always maintained that there are no women in the United States who should feel the degradation of disfranchisement so keenly as Southern women, for they have felt a special resentment in witnessing their government make their ignorant slaves the political superiors of the white women of the nation." Gordon first started the ERA (Equal Rights for All) Club in New Orleans, to gain suffrage while appealing to a majority white electorate. Her leadership in the ERA was noticed by the NAWSA, and she was offered a position as secretary of the organization. However, her more conservative views and state’s right approach ostracized her from NAWSA. Gordon opposed the push for a national amendment, and formed the Southern States Woman Suffrage Association (SSWSA) at a conference in New Orleans. This gathering was later known as the Southern States Woman Suffrage Conference, and was the most notable gathering of these Southern suffragists.

Like Gordon, Laura Clay of Kentucky (1849-1941) had been a prominent member of NAWSA; however, she became distanced from the establishment because she did not fully agree with its goals, specifically its aim of a federal amendment. She saw the federal amendment as a way to gain “publicity,” but would much rather have suffrage centered within the power of the individual states. Clay was “lukewarm” about a separate suffrage group, but joined forces with Kate Gordon in 1916 and became vice president of SSWSC. Initially, Gordon had promised her new group would work alongside, and not against, NAWSA, appealing to more centrist members like Clay. Another leader of the new SSWSC was Ida Porter Boyer, who took the position of Executive Secretary.

== Beliefs and timeline of the SSWSA ==
SSWSA utilized a local-level suffrage, much like the AWSA’s strategy. Like conservative Southern Democrats at the time, the SSWSA felt that black voters were a source of corruption and saw black disenfranchisement as a positive. The SSWSA, specifically Gordon, paralleled their beliefs to the United Daughters of the Confederacy. Formed in 1894, the United Daughters of the Confederacy was a group championing the Lost Cause, or that the Confederate fight was a just one. They worked to commemorate fallen Confederate soldiers with statues, romanticizing the era of slavery and continuing white supremacy.

Membership numbers of the SSWSA were never recorded. The organization’s New Southern Citizen was a monthly publication updating members on SSWSA’s progress; it was published from October 1914 to 1917. The New Southern Citizen famously said that "like a searchlight, the great white rays of Liberty are turned on one state after another." In a local Tennessee newspaper, the Bristol Herald Courier, the New Southern Citizen is mentioned as reporting on the "state rights" stance of Congressmen who voted against a federal suffrage amendment. The SSWSA perceived its greatest victory to be the 1916 Democratic primary, claiming that its “states' rights suffrage” had been included in the party platform.

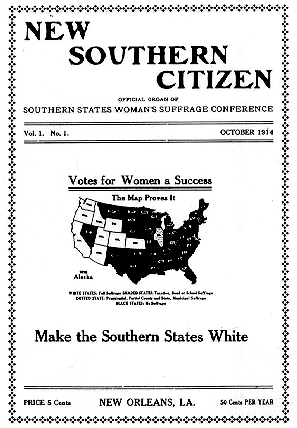
The New Southern Citizen, the monthly publication from the Southern States Woman Suffrage Association, was edited by Kate Gordon.

Monetary funds for the organization, which were estimated at $6,000 a year, were donated anonymously. Later, it was revealed that these donations came from Alva Belmont (previously a Vanderbilt), who once donated to the CU (Congressional Union). The CU, later named the National Woman’s Party, was the militant, feminist break-off from NAWSA, started by Alice Paul. Its belief in a federal amendment ideologically opposed SSWSA's state rights approach. Nevertheless, Belmont donated to both. Known for her philanthropy towards African Americans in New York, Belmont also wrote to Laura Clay saying that she understood the SSWSA’s “eternal vigilance [on the race problem] in the southern suffrage movement”.

== Tension and division ==
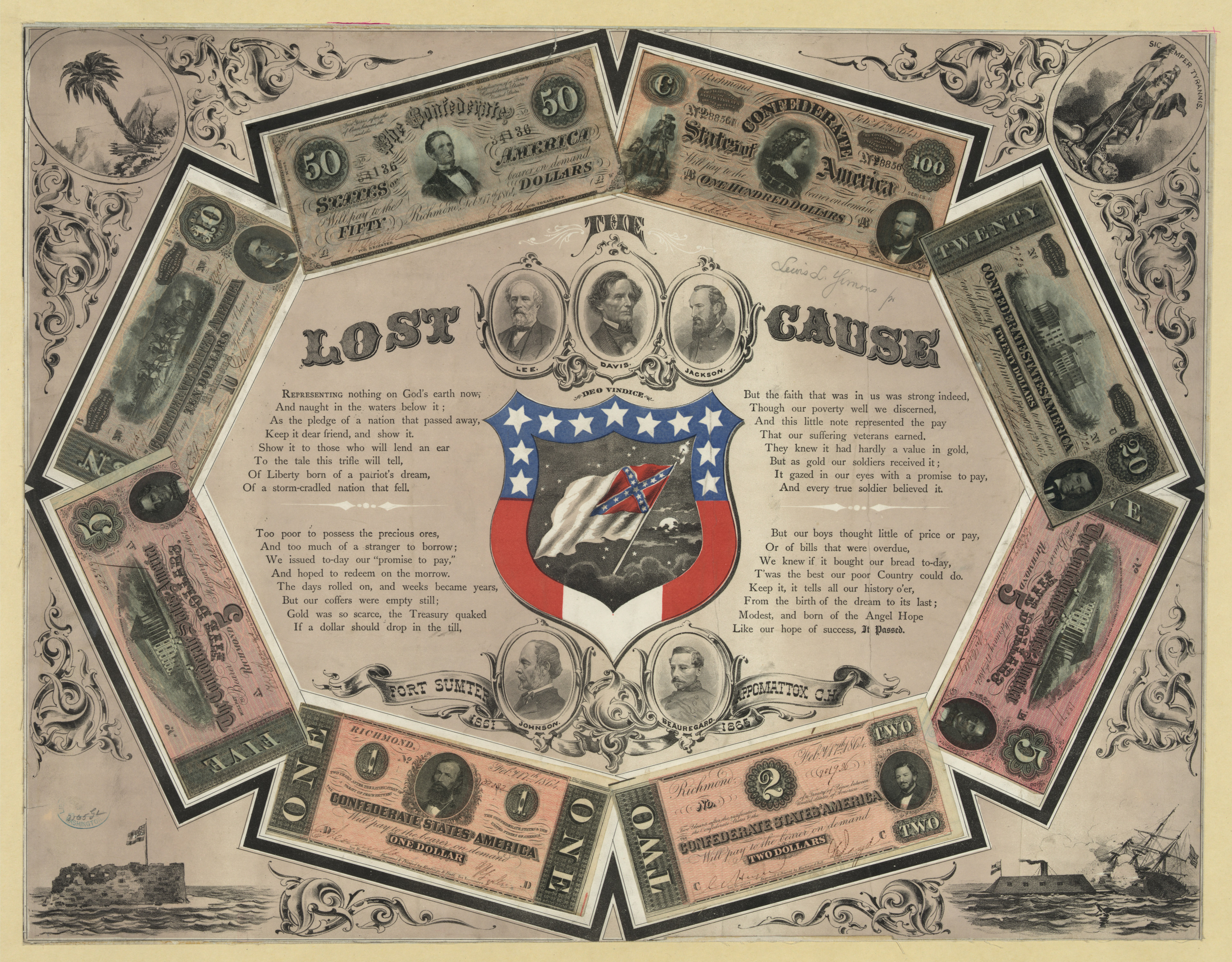
A poster detailing the "Lost Cause". These beliefs were incorporated into the platform of the SSWSA.

Gordon and Clay’s group was increasingly at odds with NAWSA, and many Southern suffragists opposed Gordon’s state level approach. No policies in the SSWSA were established to govern relations with other suffragist groups. Gordon and her ideas were seen as extreme to most suffragists, even in the South, and was all but shunned by the federal level movement. However, the position was similar to that first claimed by the National Woman Suffrage Association and Elizabeth Cady Stanton: the 15th Amendment was an over-reach of federal intervention. Laura Clay, having studied the argument of Henry St. George Tucker presented in 1916 before the Law School of Yale University, emphasized in her own presentation in 1919 during a debate with Kentucky suffragist Madeline McDowell Breckinridge that the proposed new federal amendment would overturn the rights protected by the 10th Amendment. Clay argued:

The ratification of the Anthony amendment is less a question of extending suffrage to women where the states have not done so than of conferring upon Congress certain autocratic powers over the votes for women however they may be gained. It is evident that it gives to states and sections having many Congressmen a great access of power to dictate public policies in states or sections which have a less numerous representation in Congress.

Gordon’s unwavering opposition to federal suffrage drove some prominent SSWSA leaders out of the group. Many SWWSA members preferred state suffrage, but would accept federal change if it meant gaining suffrage. Laura Clay proposed a bill to bridge the two sides: a goal of national suffrage without infringing on state’s rights. She believed she could unite all suffrage groups (NAWSA, SWWSA) under this one bill. After receiving support from the two groups, she took the bill to Congress, but it never left committee. When the Nineteenth Amendment was written in 1919, Gordon opposed its ratification.

== End of SWWSA ==
The group's activity began to decline in 1917, becoming nothing more than a “paper organization”. The group officially ended after the 19th Amendment was ratified in 1920.
