= Sara T. Mayo =

American physician

Doctor Sara Tew Mayo
- Born: May 26, 1869; Catahoula Parish, Louisiana, US
- Died: March 7, 1930 (aged 60); New Orleans, Louisiana US
- Education: Medical doctor Women's Medical College of Pennsylvania
- Occupation: physician
- Years active: 1898 - 1930
- Known for: founding the New Orleans Hospital and Dispensary for Women and Children
- Medical career
- Awards: Times-Picayune Loving Cup

Sara Tew Mayo, M.D., (1869-1930) was a physician and humanitarian reformer in New Orleans, Louisiana, USA. She served the underprivileged and advanced the cause of women as physicians at a time and place when few women were practicing physicians as a result of gender discrimination. Mayo was a founding member of the New Orleans Hospital and Dispensary for Women and Children which was renamed the Sara Mayo Hospital in 1948.

== Early life and education ==
Mayo was born on May 26, 1869, in Catahoula Parish, Louisiana, near the villages of Harrisonburg and Vidalia, Louisiana, to parents George Spencer Mayo and Emily Mayo (née Tew). Her father was a lawyer. She had two sisters, Edith Mayo (1872 - 1902) and May Mayo (1868 - 1929). Sara Mayo is reported to have had interest in medicine starting as a child, practicing on dolls and pets. Mayo's parents died when Mayo was a child. After their death, she moved to New Orleans to live with her father's cousin, Judge William Brainerd Spencer. Mayo attended public schools.

Because admissions policies of the times at many medical schools barred women from pursuing medical degrees, Mayo was denied admission to nearby Tulane University School of Medicine. Mayo enrolled at the Women's Medical College of Pennsylvania, in Philadelphia, Pennsylvania. Mayo graduated with her medical degree from the Women's Medical College of Pennsylvania in 1898.

== Career ==
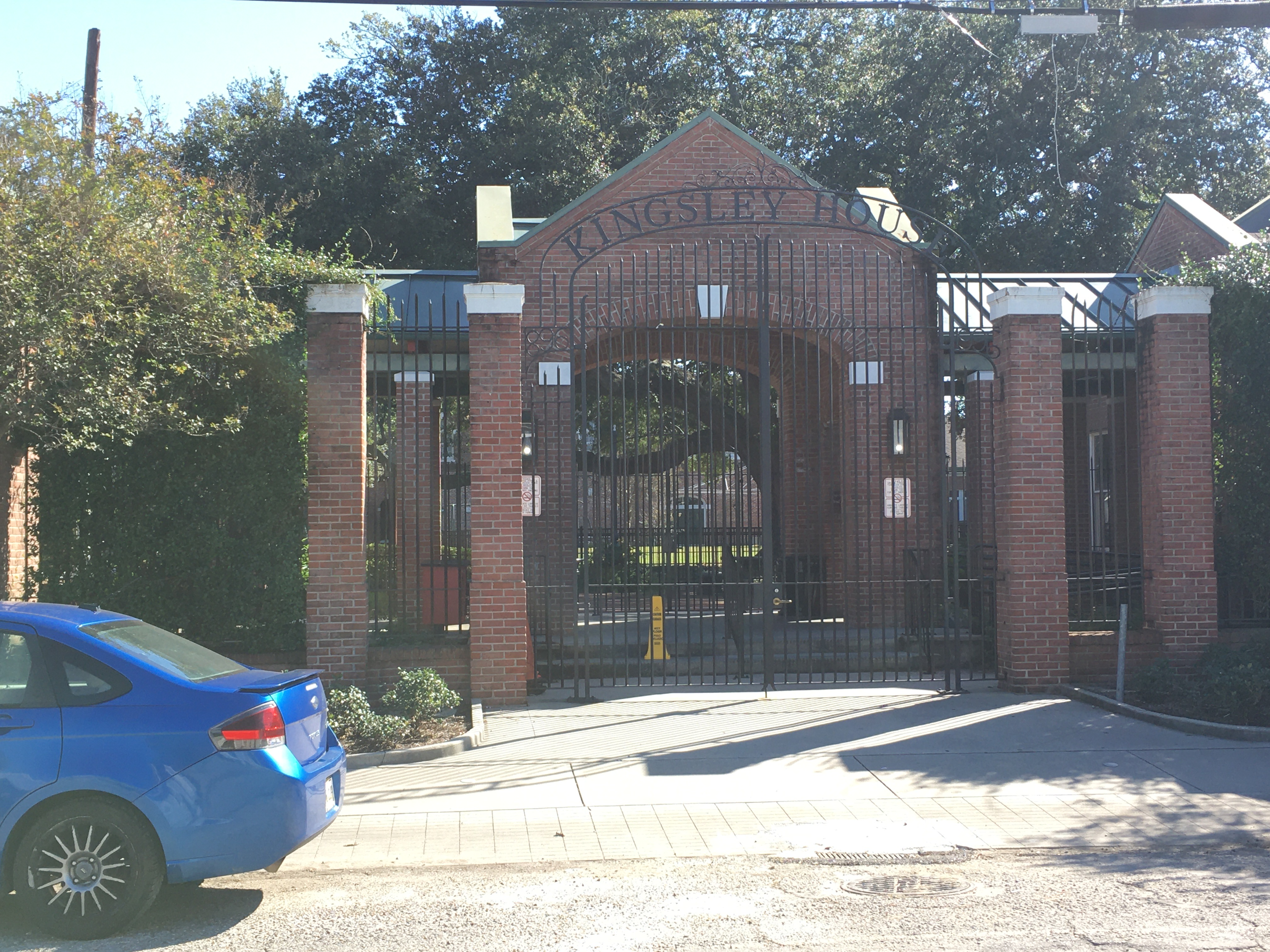
Entrance to Kingsley House in New Orleans

Following her graduation from medical school, Mayo moved to New Orleans, Louisiana, where she continued to face limitations on where she could practice medicine in the male-dominated medical community of the time. She initially took up employment at Kingsley House in New Orleans. There, Mayo commenced her career of service to disadvantaged people. At Kingsley House, Mayo met seven other women who were physicians in New Orleans, with whom she continued to collaborate through her career. The group of physicians included: Dr. Clara Glenk, Dr. Susanna Otis, Dr. Elizabeth Bass, Dr. Cora Bass, Dr. Clothilde Jacquet, Dr. Edith Loeber and Dr. M. Blanche Tassy.

=== Sara Mayo Hospital ===
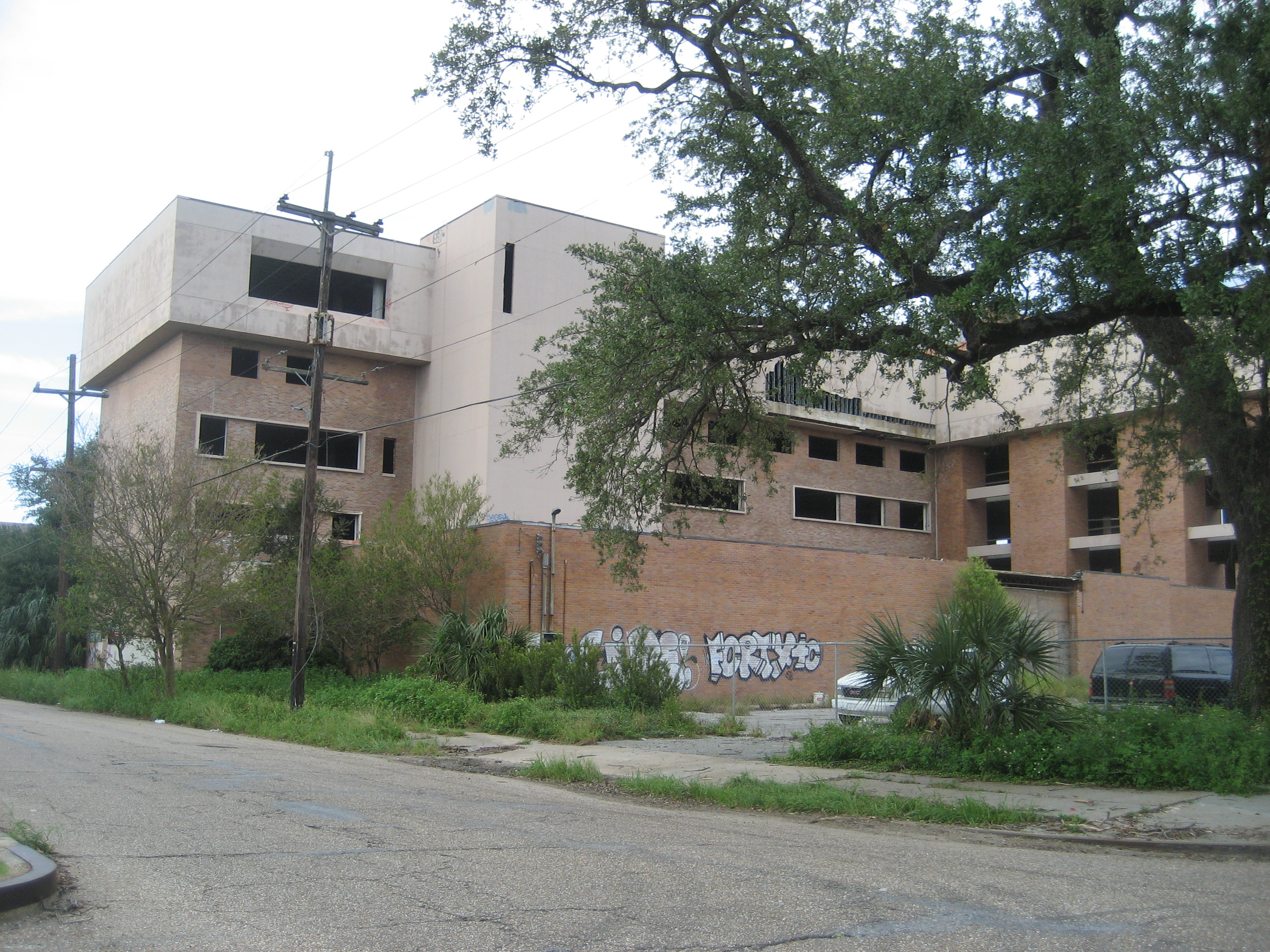
Former Sara Mayo Hospital building in Uptown New Orleans.

Working with Dr. Clara Glenk, Dr. Susanna Otis, Dr. Elizabeth Bass, Dr. Cora Bass, Dr. Clothilde Jacquet, Dr. Edith Loeber and Dr. M. Blanche Tassy, Mayo founded the New Orleans Hospital and Dispensary for Women and Children, in 1905. While not original founders, Loeber and Jaquet soon joined the staff of the new hospital. The hospital provided free treatment for women and children who were underprivileged. The hospital had an all-female staff. In addition to her responsibilities to the hospital as a physician, Mayo was also responsible for raising money through donations to support the hospital and its associated out-patient clinic.

The original location of the hospital was in a modest building at 1823 Annunciation Street in the Irish Channel of New Orleans, with just $25 in start-up capital (worth approximately $759 in inflation-adjusted 2021 dollars). The building was a converted four story house which was donated by fellow female physician and founder Susanna Otis. From its inception, the hospital was staffed exclusively by women, with Mayo and the other founding physicians providing services in internal medicine, surgery, pediatrics, dermatology, obstetrics / gynecology, neurology, and dentistry. One of the founders, M. Blanche Tassy, was a dentist, thereby enabling the hospital to provide dental services.

The hospital was successful from its start. People living nearby contributed their labor to the needs of the hospital, thereby offsetting some of the funding shortages. The hospital treated approximately 3760 patients in its first year. The hospital moved to a larger two story building in March 1908, enabled by a fund-raising effort that included a contribution of the receipts of one day's newspaper sales by the New Orleans Daily Delta. At that time, the hospital could provide in-patient services in addition to on-going out-patient services. Recognizing the hospital's success, the Louisiana State Legislature allocated $10,000 to the hospital in 1911, with funding continuing thereafter. The hospital established a nursing school, graduating its first nurses in 1911. The hospital and clinic relocated to a larger facility at 625 Jackson Avenue in New Orleans.

As an on-going policy, the hospital and associated clinic treated grown men only in emergency situations, although the policy on admission of men as patients changed in 1969. The hospital and clinic also accepted payment from patients according to their ability to pay without undue hardship.

Mayo was generally regarded as the leader of the founding group at the New Orleans Hospital and Dispensary for Women and Children. Mayo typically provided clinical services in obstetrics and gynecology, in addition to her administrative responsibilities to the hospital. She was known as "Daisy" by many of the patients at the hospital and as "Uncle Doc" to her nieces and nephews. Among her contributions, Mayo obtained financing from the Sickles Fund of Pennsylvania to offset the cost of drugs for patients at the hospital and clinic.

In 1917, the hospital treated 12,830 patients with 419 surgeries having been performed there. It filled 5382 prescriptions free of charge to the patients using money from the Sickles Fund. Private donations of money to the hospital also continued to grow as of that time.

As the hospital outgrew its original location, it moved to a facility at 810 Felicity Street in New Orleans, and then in 1940 to a much larger facility at 625 Jackson Avenue in New Orleans. The hospital was renamed Sara Mayo Hospital in 1948. By 1969, Sara Mayo Hospital had 169 beds. The hospital subsequently came under financial pressure and permanently closed in 1979, with plans to be replaced by an apartment building. As of July 2021, the structure was severely dilapidated.

=== Other professional activities ===
In 1907, Mayo established a "District Nursing Service" to provide home health nursing to underprivileged people. New Orleans Mayor Martin Behrman appointed Mayo to the board of directors of the Sickles Commission. In this post, Mayo influenced the fund to provide significant financing for prescription drugs to underprivileged people in the New Orleans area.

Mayo and other female physicians in New Orleans continued to press for admission to staffs of other hospitals in the New Orleans area. In 1913, Mayo was granted membership to the Orleans Parish Medical Society, being among the first women so granted membership. Mayo also became a member of the medical staffs at Touro Infirmary and at Southern Baptist Hospital. She also served at the St. Anna's Asylum for Destitute Women and Children, also in the New Orleans area.

Mayo gave oral presentations to a variety of professional audiences and lay audiences, promoting public health and humanitarian causes. A representative of a presentation by Mayo was one on effective parenthood and its value to the good of the community in a 1914 presentation in Vicksburg, Mississippi. She was active in the New Orleans Federation of Women's Clubs.

Mayo was active in the Era Club of New Orleans in its efforts to advanced social reform and feminist causes, led at the time by suffragist Kate M. Gordon.

Mayo was a mentor to Dr. Linda Coleman who worked as an intern at the New Orleans Hospital and Dispensary for Women and Children and who was the first woman to graduate from the Tulane University School of Medicine (1917).

=== Death ===
Mayo died in 1930 of heart disease related to angina pectoris and was interred at Metairie Cemetery. She continued to work as a physician and on behalf of humanitarian causes until the time of her death. Her grave stone gives a different birthdate than other sources (April 1870 rather than May 1869).

== Awards and honors ==
Mayo was the winner of the New Orleans Times-Picayune Loving Cup Award in 1910 in recognition of her charitable work. In 2018 the New Orleans Times-Picayune newspaper named Mayo one of its "300 for 300", honoring 300 people who contributed significantly to the 300 year history of the City of New Orleans. As part of the "300 for 300", the newspaper commissioned a portrait of Mayo by artist Saegan Swanson.

The city government of New Orleans has considered renaming Penn Street in honor of Mayo. As of May 2021, the change has not happened.

Shortly after Mayo's death in 1930, the Board of Directors of the New Orleans Hospital and Dispensary for Women and Children issued a resolution stating:

"Her cheery smile, hopeful words, great skill and greater heart have proved a boon to untold thousands of women who, through her ministrations, have been lifted out of a condition of pain and disease into health again. She gave unstintingly not only of her skill, but of her heart."
