= Elizabeth Bass =

American physician

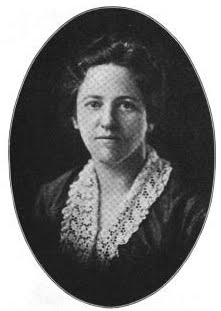
Dr. Elizabeth Bass in 1920.

Mary Elizabeth Bass (April 5, 1876 – January 26, 1956) was an American physician, educator and suffragist. She was the first of two women to become faculty members at the medical school of Tulane University along with Edith Ballard. Bass worked to promote the efforts of women as physicians. She worked at Tulane for thirty years.

== Biography ==
Bass was born on April 5, 1876, in Marion County, Mississippi, and was one of eight children. The family lost their property in the depression and they moved to Lumberton, Mississippi. Bass worked as an assistant teacher and attended Columbia High School, where she graduated in 1893. She also earned teaching certificates in both 1892 and 1896 from normal schools. She worked as a teacher for some time in the public schools of Mississippi and Texas.

Bass' older brother, Charles, persuaded her and her sister, Cora, to become doctors sometime around 1899. However, schools in the southern United States wouldn't admit women into their medical programs at the time, so the sisters went north to attend school. Bass and her sister went to the Woman's Medical College of Pennsylvania and they graduated in 1904. Charles Bass had a private practice in New Orleans and the sisters began their own private practice in the same city. Because the city hospitals of New Orleans did not accept women physicians as staff members, Bass became a founder of a dispensary which would later become the New Orleans Hospital and Dispensary for Women and Children (now the Sara Mayo Hospital) in 1908.

Bass became a member of the Era Club of New Orleans in 1905. The Era Club helped influence the decision to allow women to enroll in Tulane University as medical students in 1914.

In 1911, Bass and another physician, Edith Ballard, became the first women faculty members of the Tulane University school of medicine. By 1913, she became a salaried faculty member as an instructor in the laboratory of clinical medicine. Also in 1913, Bass became the first women elected as an active member of the Orleans Parish Medical Society. In 1915, she joined the Women Physicians of the Southern Medical Association (WPSMA). By 1920, she was a full professor and during her career at Tulane taught pathology, clinical laboratory diagnosis, bacteriology and clinical medicine. She served as president of the Medical Women's National Association in 1921 and 1922. Bass retired from teaching in 1941. After retiring, she became the house physician at the Jung Hotel. She stopped practicing medicine in 1949 and spent time caring for her mother in Lumberton.

Bass was honored by the American Medical Women's Association with the Elizabeth Blackwell Centennial Medal Award in 1953. In 1956, Bass died of cancer at the Foundation Hospital in New Orleans and her body was buried in Lumberton.

== Legacy ==
After Bass' death in 1956, friends at Tulane created the Elizabeth Bass Memorial Medical Student Loan Fund.

Bass collected a large body of work by and about women in medicine. She also collected the manuscripts, papers, pictures, letters, press clippings and other ephemera created by women physicians. Bass wrote essays and histories based on her collection which now resides at the Matas Medical Library. The collection itself also "documents the obstacles women had to overcome to become physicians."
