= National American Woman Suffrage Association =

US 19th century suffrage association

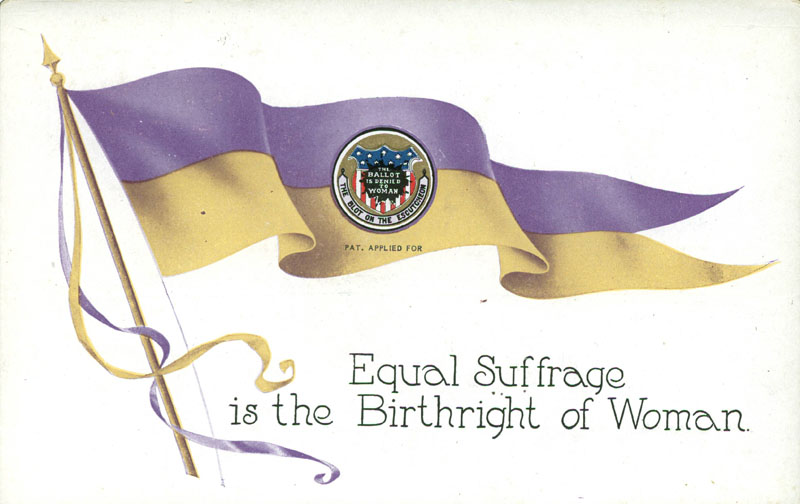

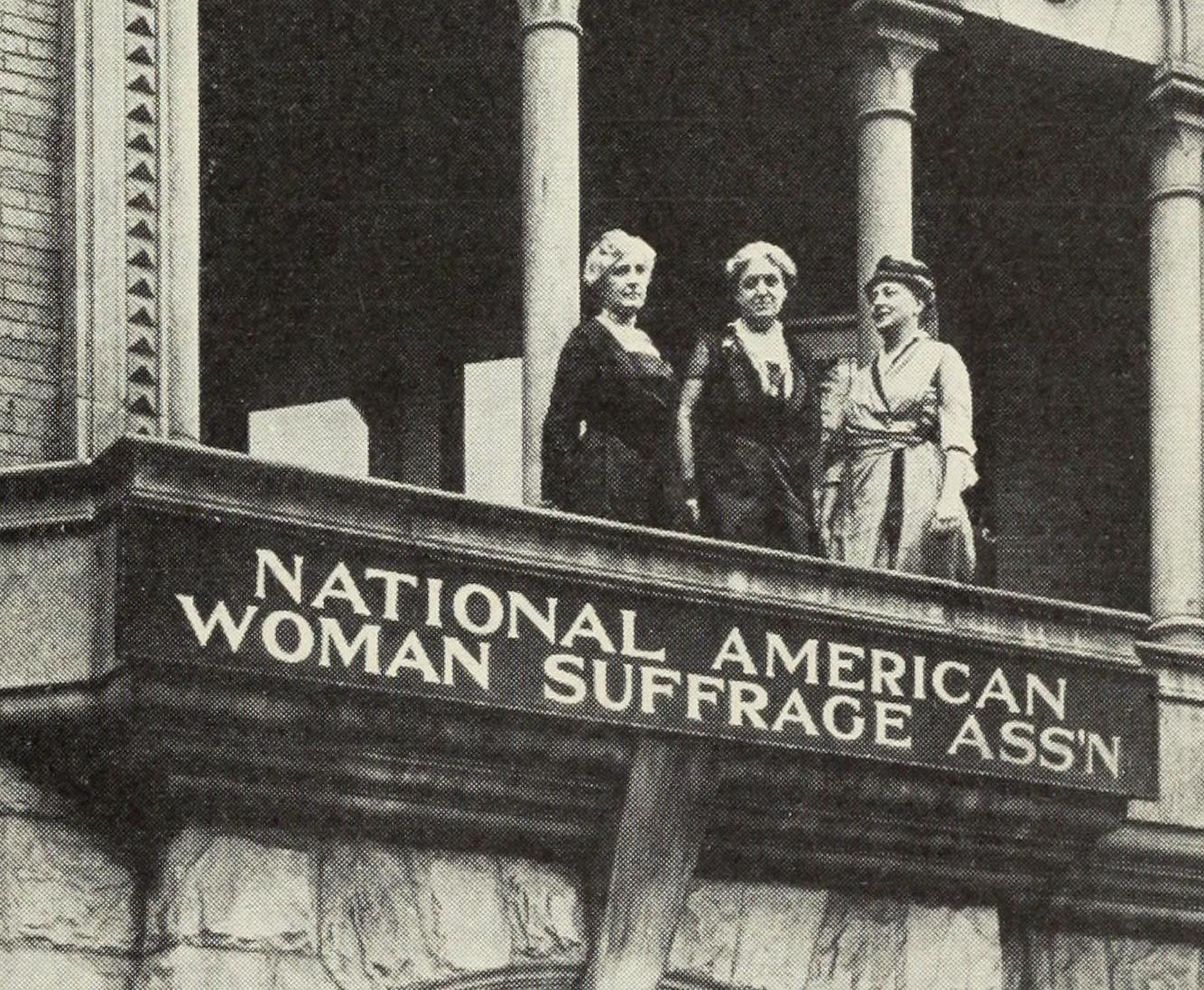
- Gardener, Park and Catt at Suffrage House in Washington, D.C.
- Abbreviation: NAWSA
- Predecessor: Merging of the National Woman Suffrage Association and the American Woman Suffrage Association
- Successor: League of Women Voters
- Formation: 1890; 136 years ago
- Dissolved: 1920; 106 years ago
- Key people: Susan B. Anthony, Elizabeth Cady Stanton, Carrie Chapman Catt, Lucy Stone

The National American Woman Suffrage Association (NAWSA) was an organization formed on February 18, 1890, to advocate in favor of women's suffrage in the United States. It was created by the merger of two existing organizations, the National Woman Suffrage Association (NWSA) and the American Woman Suffrage Association (AWSA). Its membership, which was about seven thousand at the time it was formed, eventually increased to two million, making it the largest voluntary organization in the nation. It played a pivotal role in the passing of the Nineteenth Amendment to the United States Constitution, which in 1920 guaranteed women's right to vote.

Susan B. Anthony, a long-time leader in the suffrage movement, was the dominant figure in the newly formed NAWSA. Carrie Chapman Catt, who became president after Anthony retired in 1900, implemented a strategy of recruiting wealthy members of the rapidly growing women's club movement, whose time, money and experience could help build the suffrage movement. Anna Howard Shaw's term in office, which began in 1904, saw strong growth in the organization's membership and public approval.

After the Senate decisively rejected the proposed women's suffrage amendment to the U.S. Constitution in 1887, the suffrage movement had concentrated most of its efforts on state suffrage campaigns. In 1910 Alice Paul joined the NAWSA and played a major role in reviving interest in the national amendment. After continuing conflicts with the NAWSA leadership over tactics, Paul created a rival organization, the National Woman's Party.

When Catt again became president in 1915, the NAWSA adopted her plan to centralize the organization, and work toward the suffrage amendment as its primary goal. This was done despite opposition from Southern members who believed that a federal amendment would erode states' rights. With its large membership and the increasing number of women voters in states where suffrage had already been achieved, the NAWSA began to operate more as a political pressure group than an educational group. It won additional sympathy for the suffrage cause by actively cooperating with the war effort during World War I. On February 14, 1920, several months prior to the ratification of the Nineteenth Amendment, the NAWSA transformed itself into the League of Women Voters, which is still active.

== Background ==
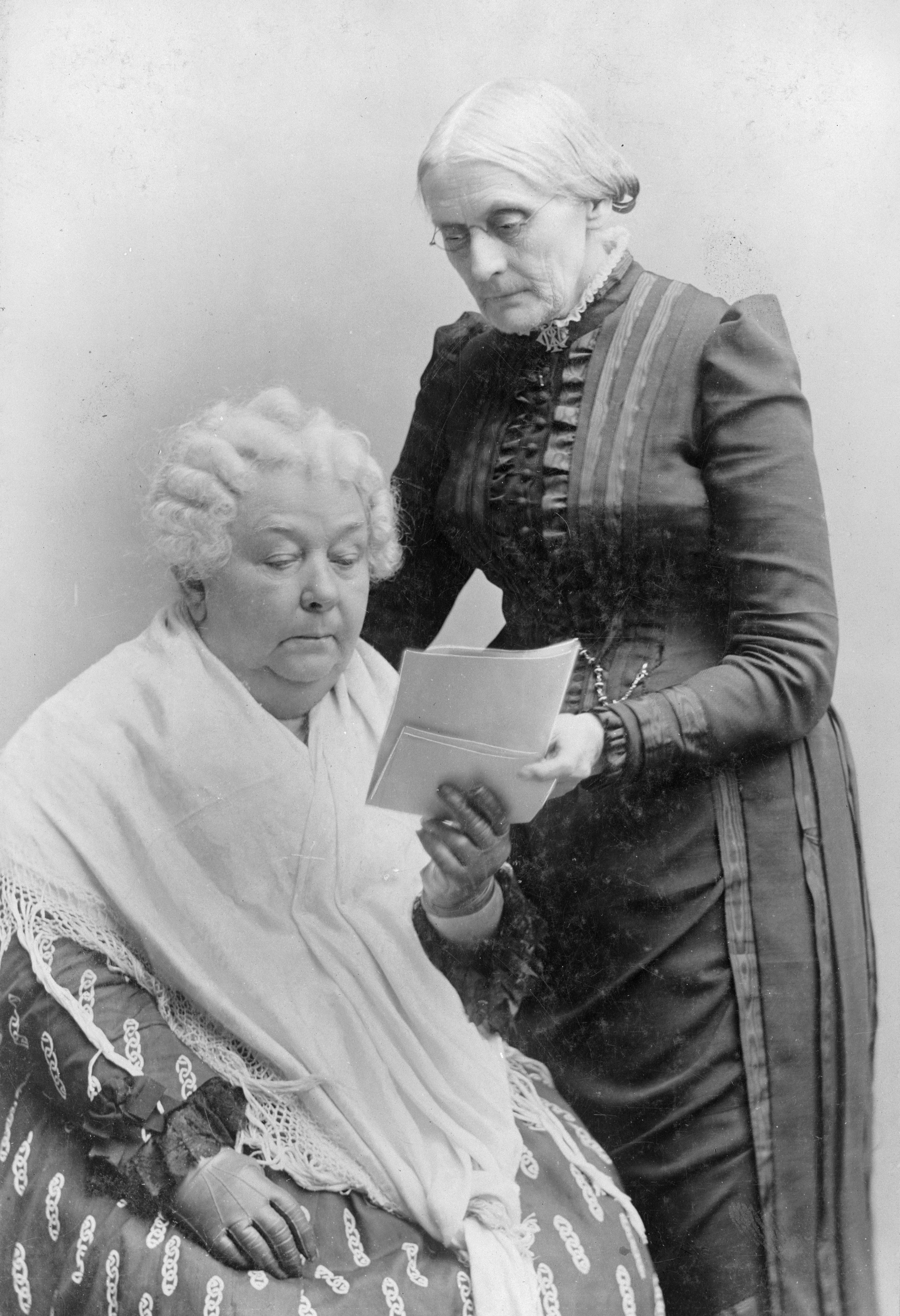
Elizabeth Cady Stanton (seated) with Susan B. Anthony in the late 19th century

The demand for women's suffrage in the United States was controversial even among women's rights activists in the early days of the movement. In 1848, a resolution in favor of women's right to vote was approved only after vigorous debate at the Seneca Falls Convention, the first women's rights convention. By the time of the National Women's Rights Conventions in the 1850s, the situation had changed, and women's suffrage had become a preeminent goal of the movement. Three leaders of the women's movement during this period, Lucy Stone, Elizabeth Cady Stanton, and Susan B. Anthony, played prominent roles in the creation of the NAWSA many years later.

In 1866, just after the American Civil War, the Eleventh National Women's Rights Convention transformed itself into the American Equal Rights Association (AERA), which worked for equal rights for both African Americans and white women, especially suffrage. The AERA essentially collapsed in 1869, partly because of disagreement over the proposed Fifteenth Amendment to the United States Constitution, which would enfranchise African American men. Leaders of the women's movement were dismayed that it would not also enfranchise women. Stanton and Anthony opposed its ratification unless it was accompanied by another amendment that would enfranchise women. Stone supported the amendment. She believed that its ratification would spur politicians to support a similar amendment for women. She said that even though the right to vote was more important for women than for black men, "I will be thankful in my soul if any body can get out of the terrible pit."

In May 1869, two days after the acrimonious debates at what turned out to be the final AERA annual meeting, Anthony, Stanton and their allies formed the National Woman Suffrage Association (NWSA). In November 1869, the American Woman Suffrage Association (AWSA) was formed by Lucy Stone, her husband Henry Blackwell, Julia Ward Howe and their allies, many of whom had helped to create the New England Woman Suffrage Association a year earlier as part of the developing split. The bitter rivalry between the two organizations created a partisan atmosphere that endured for decades.

Even after the Fifteenth Amendment was ratified in 1870, differences between the two organizations remained. The AWSA worked almost exclusively for women's suffrage while the NWSA initially worked on a wide range of issues, including divorce reform and equal pay for women. The AWSA included both men and women among its leadership while the NWSA was led by women. The AWSA worked for suffrage mostly at the state level while the NWSA worked more at the national level. The AWSA cultivated an image of respectability while the NWSA sometimes used confrontational tactics. Anthony, for example, interrupted the official ceremonies at the 100th anniversary of the Declaration of Independence to present NWSA's Declaration of Rights for Women. Anthony was arrested in 1872 for voting, which was still illegal for women, and was found guilty in a highly publicized trial.

Progress toward women's suffrage was slow in the period after the split, but advancement in other areas strengthened the underpinnings of the movement. By 1890, tens of thousands of women were attending colleges and universities, up from zero a few decades earlier. There was a decline in public support for the idea of "woman's sphere", the belief that a woman's place was in the home and that she should not be involved in politics. Laws that had allowed husbands to control their wives' activities had been significantly revised. There was a dramatic growth in all-female social reform organizations, such as the Woman's Christian Temperance Union (WCTU), the largest women's organization in the country. In a major boost for the suffrage movement, the WCTU endorsed women's suffrage in the late 1870s on the grounds that women needed the vote to protect their families from alcohol and other vices.

Anthony increasingly began to emphasize suffrage over other women's rights issues. Her aim was to unite the growing number of women's organizations in the demand for suffrage even if they did not support other women's rights issues. She and the NWSA also began placing less emphasis on confrontational actions and more on respectability. The NWSA was no longer seen as an organization that challenged traditional family arrangements by supporting, for example, what its opponents called "easy divorce". All this had the effect of moving it into closer alignment with the AWSA. The Senate's rejection in 1887 of the proposed women's suffrage amendment to the U.S. Constitution also brought the two organizations closer together. The NWSA had worked for years to convince Congress to bring the proposed amendment to a vote. After it was voted on and decisively rejected, the NWSA began to put less energy into campaigning at the federal level and more at the state level, as the AWSA was already doing.

Stanton continued to promote all aspects of women's rights. She advocated a coalition of radical social reform groups, including Populists and Socialists, who would support women's suffrage as part of a joint list of demands. In a letter to a friend, Stanton said the NWSA "has been growing politic and conservative for some time. Lucy [Stone] and Susan [Anthony] alike see suffrage only. They do not see woman's religious and social bondage, neither do the young women in either association, hence they may as well combine". Stanton, however, had largely withdrawn from the day-to-day activity of the suffrage movement. She spent much of her time with her daughter in England during this period. Despite their different approaches, Stanton and Anthony remained friends and co-workers, continuing a collaboration that had begun in the early 1850s.

Stone devoted most of her life after the split to the Woman's Journal, a weekly newspaper she launched in 1870 to serve as voice of the AWSA. By the 1880s, the Woman's Journal had broadened its coverage and was seen by many as the newspaper of the entire movement.

The suffrage movement was attracting younger members who were impatient with the continuing division, seeing the obstacle more as a matter of personalities than principles. Alice Stone Blackwell, daughter of Lucy Stone, said, "When I began to work for a union, the elders were not keen for it, on either side, but the younger women on both sides were. Nothing really stood in the way except the unpleasant feelings engendered during the long separation".

== Merger of rival organizations ==
Several attempts had been made to bring the two sides together, but without success. The situation changed in 1887 when Stone, who was approaching her 70th birthday and in declining health, began to seek ways of overcoming the split. In a letter to suffragist Antoinette Brown Blackwell, she suggested the creation of an umbrella organization of which the AWSA and the NWSA would become auxiliaries, but that idea did not gain supporters. In November 1887, the AWSA annual meeting passed a resolution authorizing Stone to confer with Anthony about the possibility of a merger. The resolution said the differences between the two associations had "been largely removed by the adoption of common principles and methods." Stone forwarded the resolution to Anthony along with an invitation to meet with her.

Anthony and Rachel Foster, a young leader of the NWSA, traveled to Boston in December 1887, to meet with Stone. Accompanying Stone at this meeting was her daughter Alice Stone Blackwell, who also was an officer of the AWSA. Stanton, who was in England at the time, did not attend. The meeting explored several aspects of a possible merger, including the name of the new organization and its structure. Stone had second thoughts soon afterwards, telling a friend she wished they had never offered to unite, but the merger process slowly continued.

An early public sign of improving relations between the two organizations occurred three months later at the founding congress of the International Council of Women, which the NWSA organized and hosted in Washington in conjunction with the fortieth anniversary of the Seneca Falls Convention. It received favorable publicity, and its delegates, who came from fifty-three women's organizations in nine countries, were invited to a reception at the White House. Representatives from the AWSA were invited to sit on the platform during the meetings along with representatives from the NWSA, signaling a new atmosphere of cooperation.

The proposed merger did not generate significant controversy within the AWSA. The call to its annual meeting in 1887, the one that authorized Stone to explore the possibility of merger, did not even mention that this issue would be on the agenda. This proposal was treated in a routine manner during the meeting and was approved unanimously without debate.

The situation was different within the NWSA, where there was strong opposition from Matilda Joslyn Gage, Olympia Brown and others. Ida Husted Harper, Anthony's co-worker and biographer, said the NWSA meetings that dealt with this issue "were the most stormy in the history of the association." Charging that Anthony had used underhanded tactics to thwart opposition to the merger, Gage formed a competing organization in 1890 called the Woman's National Liberal Union, but it did not develop a significant following.

The AWSA and NWSA committees that negotiated the terms of merger signed a basis for agreement in January, 1889. In February, Stone, Stanton, Anthony and other leaders of both organizations issued an "Open Letter to the Women of America" declaring their intention to work together. When Anthony and Stone first discussed the possibility of merger in 1887, Stone had proposed that she, Stanton and Anthony should all decline the presidency of the united organization. Anthony initially agreed, but other NWSA members objected strongly. The basis for agreement did not include that stipulation.

The AWSA initially was the larger of the two organizations, but it had declined in strength during the 1880s. The NWSA was perceived as the main representative of the suffrage movement, partly because of Anthony's ability to find dramatic ways of bringing suffrage to the nation's attention. Anthony and Stanton had also published their massive History of Woman Suffrage, which placed them at the center of the movement's history and marginalized the role of Stone and the AWSA. Stone's public visibility had declined significantly, contrasting sharply with the attention she had attracted in her younger days as a speaker on the national lecture circuit.

Anthony was increasingly recognized as a person of political importance. In 1890, prominent members of the House and Senate were among the two hundred people who attended her seventieth birthday celebration, a national event that took place in Washington three days before the convention that united the two suffrage organizations. Anthony and Stanton pointedly reaffirmed their friendship at this event, frustrating opponents of merger who had hoped to set them against one another.

== Founding convention ==
The National American Woman Suffrage Association (NAWSA) was created on February 18, 1890, in Washington by a convention that merged the NWSA and the AWSA. The question of who would lead the new organization had been left to the convention delegates. Stone, from the AWSA, was too ill to attend this convention and was not a candidate. Anthony and Stanton, both from the NWSA, each had supporters.

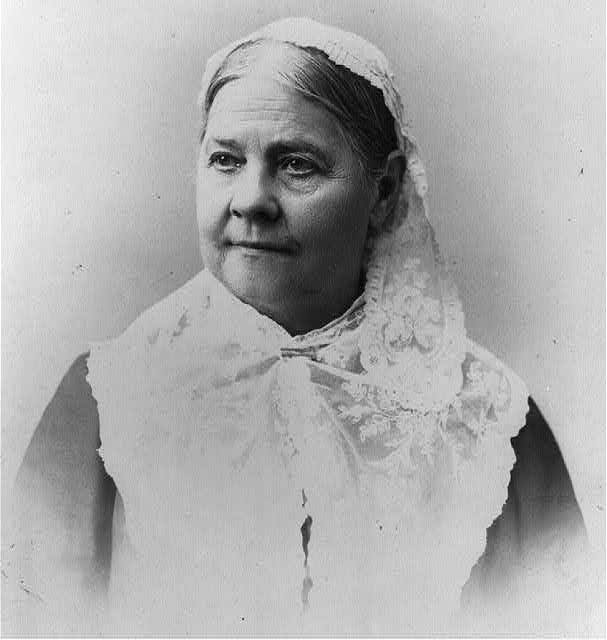
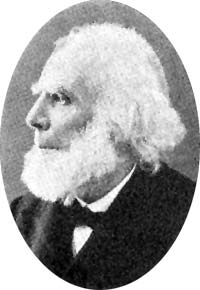
Lucy Stone and her husband Henry Blackwell

The AWSA and NWSA executive committees met separately beforehand to discuss their choices for president of the united organization. At the AWSA meeting, Henry Blackwell, Stone's husband, said the NWSA had agreed to avoid mixing in side issues (the approach associated with Stanton) and to focus exclusively on suffrage (the approach of the AWSA and increasingly of Anthony). The executive committee recommended that AWSA delegates vote for Anthony. At the NWSA meeting, Anthony strongly urged its members not to vote for her but for Stanton, saying that a defeat of Stanton would be viewed as a repudiation of her role in the movement.

Elections were held at the convention's opening. Stanton received 131 votes for president, Anthony received 90, and 2 votes were cast for other candidates. Anthony was elected vice president at large with 213 votes, with 9 votes for other candidates. Stone was unanimously elected chair of the executive committee.

As president, Stanton delivered the convention's opening address. She urged the new organization to concern itself with a broad range of reforms, saying, "When any principle or question is up for discussion, let us seize on it and show its connection, whether nearly or remotely, with woman's disfranchisement." She introduced controversial resolutions, including one that called for women to be included at all levels of leadership within religious organizations and one that described liberal divorce laws as a married woman's "door of escape from bondage." Her speech had little lasting impact on the organization, however, because most of the younger suffragists did not agree with her approach.

== Stanton and Anthony presidencies ==
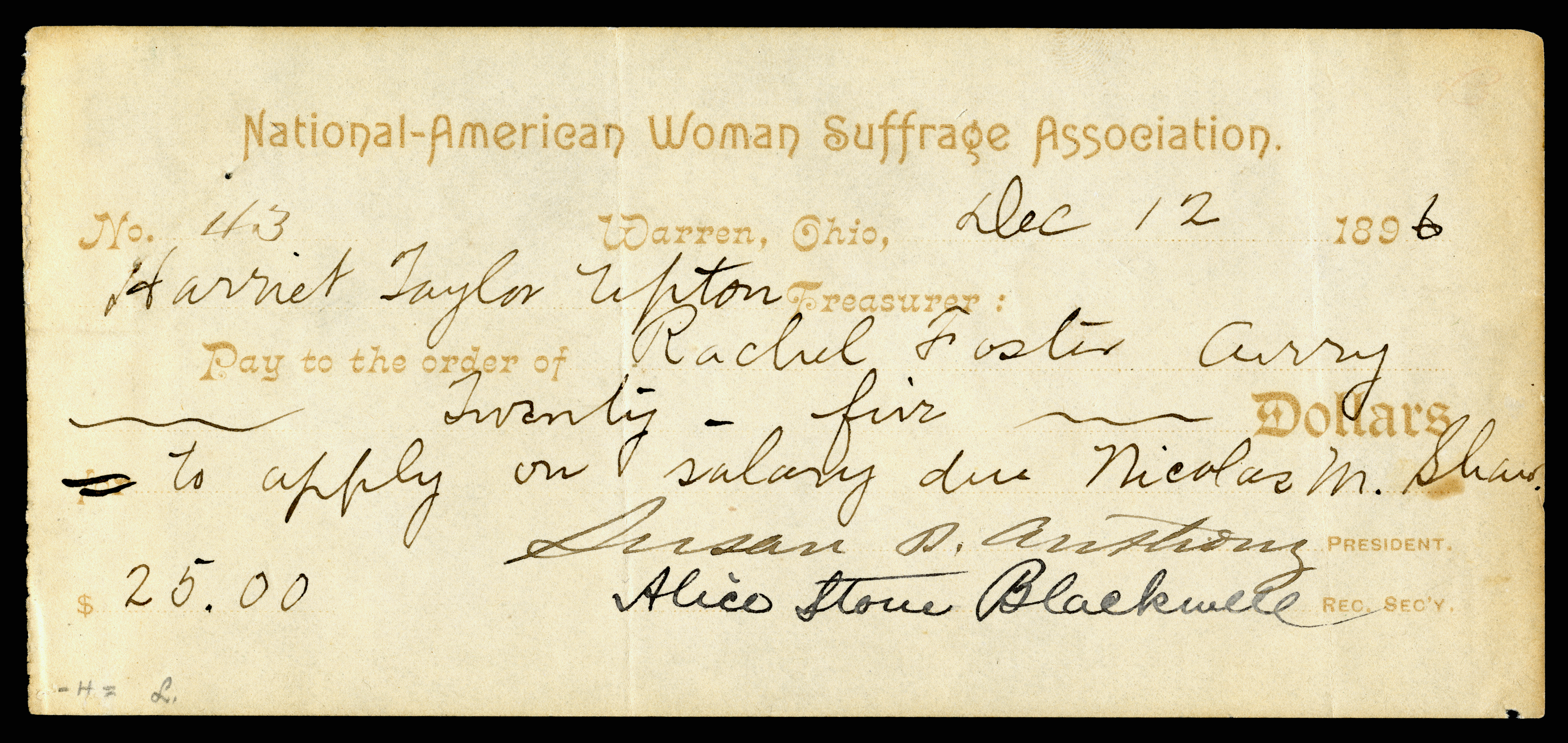
Susan B. Anthony and Alice Stone Blackwell signed NAWSA check, written by the group's treasurer Harriet Taylor Upton, payable to Rachel Foster Avery

Stanton's election as president was largely symbolic. Before the convention was over, she left for another extended stay with her daughter in England, leaving Anthony in charge. Stanton retired from the presidency in 1892, after which Anthony was elected to the position that she had in practice been occupying all along. Stone, who died in 1893, did not play a major role in the NAWSA.

The movement's vigor declined in the years immediately after the merger. The new organization was small, having only about 7000 dues-paying members in 1893. It also suffered from organizational problems, not having a clear idea of, for example, how many local suffrage clubs there were or who their officers were.

In 1893, NAWSA members May Wright Sewall, former chair of NWSA's executive committee, and Rachel Foster Avery, NAWSA's corresponding secretary, played key roles in the World's Congress of Representative Women at the World's Columbian Exposition, which was also known as the Chicago World's Fair. Sewall served as chair and Avery as secretary of the organizing committee for the women's congress.

In 1893, the NAWSA voted over Anthony's objection to alternate the site of its annual conventions between Washington and other parts of the country. Anthony's pre-merger NWSA had always held its conventions in Washington to help maintain focus on a national suffrage amendment. Anthony said she feared, accurately as it turned out, that the NAWSA would engage in suffrage work at the state level at the expense of national work. The NAWSA routinely allocated no funding at all for congressional work, which at this stage consisted only of one day of testimony before Congress each year.

=== Woman's Bible ===
Stanton's radicalism did not sit well with the new organization. In 1895 she published The Woman's Bible, a controversial best-seller that attacked the use of the Bible to relegate women to an inferior status. Her opponents within the NAWSA reacted strongly. They felt that the book would harm the drive for women's suffrage. Rachel Foster Avery, the organization's corresponding secretary, sharply denounced Stanton's book in her annual report to the 1896 convention. The NAWSA voted to disavow any connection with the book despite Anthony's strong objection that such a move was unnecessary and hurtful.

The negative reaction to the book contributed to a sharp decline in Stanton's influence in the suffrage movement and to her increasing alienation from it. She sent letters to each NAWSA convention, however, and Anthony insisted that they be read even when their topics were controversial. Stanton died in 1902.

=== Southern strategy ===
The South had traditionally shown little interest in women's suffrage. When the proposed suffrage amendment to the Constitution was rejected by the Senate in 1887, it received no votes at all from southern senators. This indicated a problem for the future because it was almost impossible for any amendment to be ratified by the required number of states without at least some support from the South.

In 1867, Henry Blackwell proposed a solution: convince southern political leaders that they could ensure white supremacy in their region by enfranchising educated women, who would predominantly be white. Blackwell presented his plan to politicians from Mississippi, who gave it serious consideration, a development that drew the interest of many suffragists. Blackwell's ally in this effort was Laura Clay, who convinced the NAWSA to launch a campaign in the South based on Blackwell's strategy. Clay was one of several southern NAWSA members who objected to the proposed national women's suffrage amendment on the grounds that it would impinge on states' rights.

Susan B. Anthony and Carrie Chapman Catt traveled through the South en route to the NAWSA convention in Atlanta. Anthony asked her old friend Frederick Douglass, a former slave, not to attend the NAWSA convention in Atlanta in 1895, the first to be held in a southern city. Black NAWSA members were excluded from 1903 convention in the southern city of New Orleans. The NAWSA executive board issued a statement during the convention that said, "The doctrine of State's rights is recognized in the national body, and each auxiliary State association arranges its own affairs in accordance with its own ideas and in harmony with the customs of its own section." As NAWSA turned its attention to a Constitutional Amendment, many Southern suffragists remained opposed because a federal amendment would enfranchise Black women. In response, in 1914, Kate Gordon founded the Southern States Woman Suffrage Conference, which opposed the Nineteenth Amendment.

=== First Catt presidency ===
Carrie Chapman Catt joined the suffrage movement in Iowa in the mid-1880s. and soon became part of the leadership of the state suffrage association. Married to a wealthy engineer who encouraged her suffrage work, she was able to devote much of her energy to the movement. She led some smaller NAWSA committees, for example serving as Chairman of the Literature Committee in 1893 with the help of Mary Hutcheson Page, another active NAWSA member. In 1895, she was placed in charge of NAWSA's Organizational Committee, where she raised money to put a team of fourteen organizers in the field. By 1899, suffrage organizations had been established in every state. When Anthony retired as NAWSA president in 1900, she chose Catt to succeed her. Anthony remained an influential figure in the organization, however, until she died in 1906.

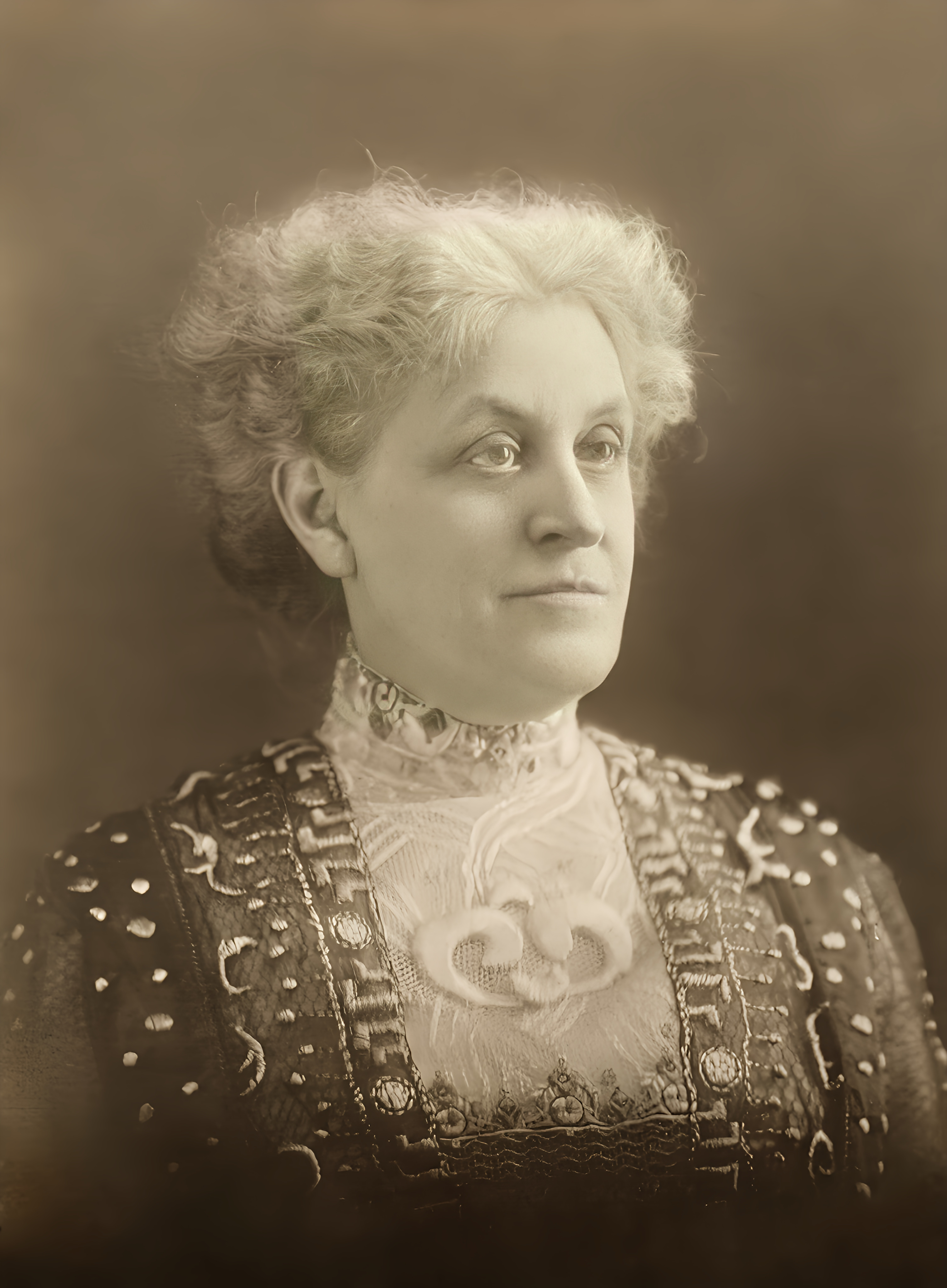
Carrie Chapman Catt

One of Catt's first actions as president was to implement the "society plan," a campaign to recruit wealthy members of the rapidly growing women's club movement, whose time, money and experience could help build the suffrage movement. Primarily composed of middle-class women, the targeted clubs often engaged in civic improvement projects. They generally avoided controversial issues, but women's suffrage increasingly found acceptance among their membership. In 1914, suffrage was endorsed by the General Federation of Women's Clubs, the national body for the club movement.

To make the suffrage movement more attractive to middle- and upper-class women, the NAWSA began to popularize a version of the movement's history that downplayed the earlier involvement of many of its members with such controversial issues as racial equality, divorce reform, working women's rights and critiques of organized religion. Stanton's role in the movement was obscured by this process, as were the roles of black and working women. Anthony, who in her younger days was often treated as a dangerous fanatic, was given a grandmotherly image and honored as a "suffrage saint."

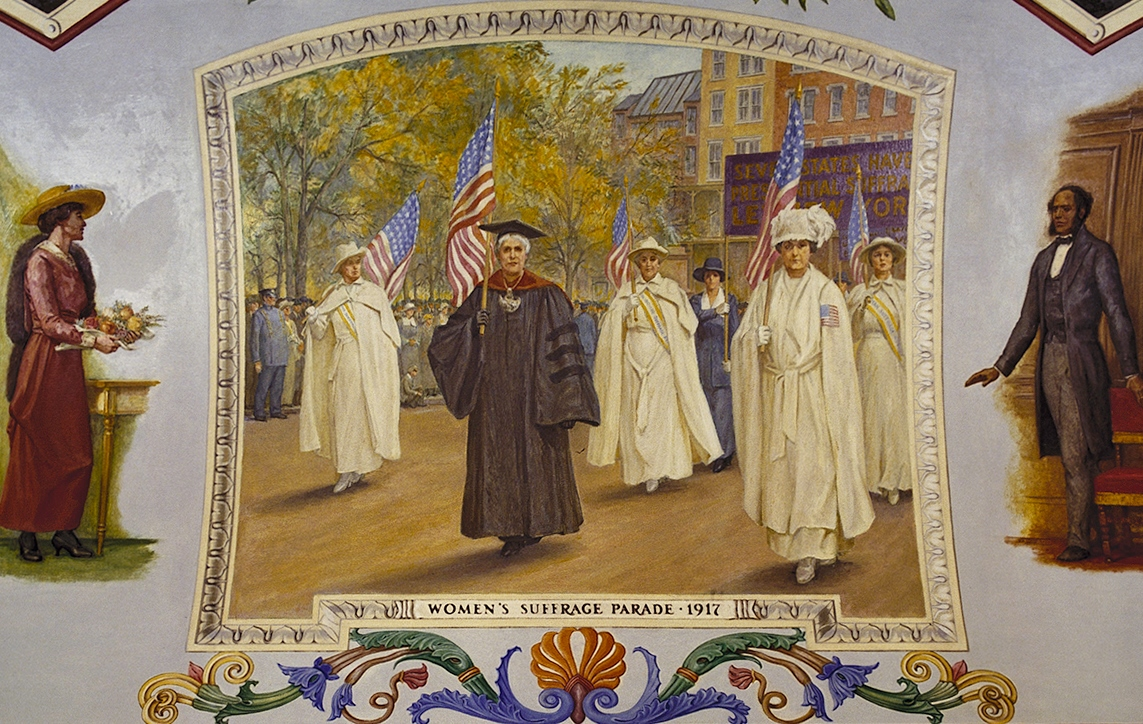
Mural in U.S. Capitol featuring NAWSA leaders Anna Howard Shaw and Carrie Chapman Catt at a 1917 suffrage parade, by Allyn Cox

The reform energy of the Progressive Era strengthened the suffrage movement during this period. Beginning around 1900, this broad movement began at the grassroots level with such goals as combating corruption in government, eliminating child labor, and protecting workers and consumers. Many of its participants saw women's suffrage as yet another progressive goal, and they believed that the addition of women to the electorate would help the movement achieve its other goals.

Catt resigned her position after four years, partly because of her husband's declining health and partly to help organize the International Woman Suffrage Alliance, which was created in Berlin in 1904 in coordination with the NAWSA and with Catt as president.

== Shaw presidency ==
In 1904, Anna Howard Shaw, another Anthony protégé, was elected president of the NAWSA, serving more years in that office than any other person. Shaw was an energetic worker and a talented orator. Her administrative and interpersonal skills did not match those that Catt would display during her second term in office, but the organization made striking gains under Shaw's leadership.

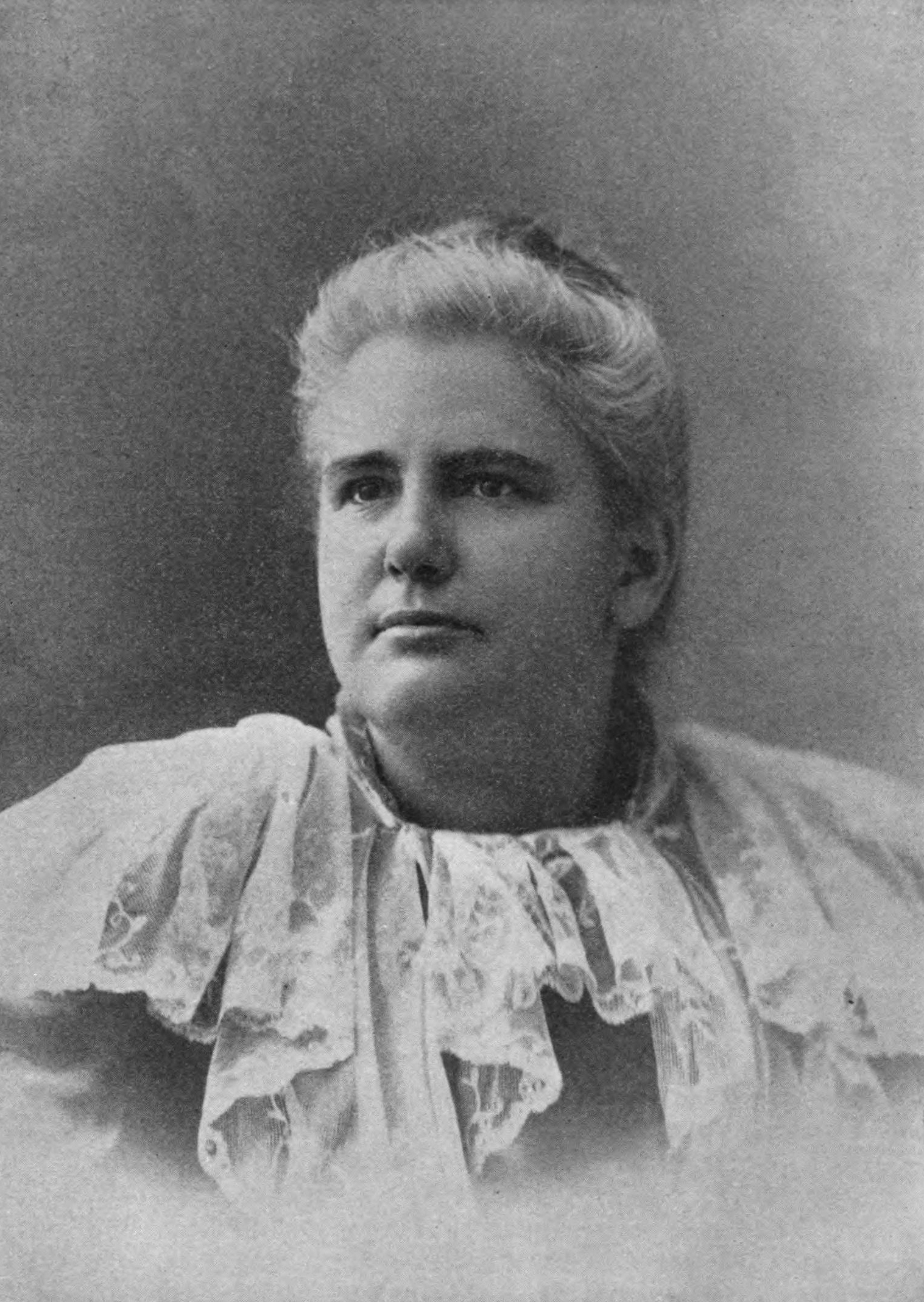
Anna Howard Shaw

In 1906, southern NAWSA members formed the Southern Woman Suffrage Conference with Blackwell's encouragement. Although it had a frankly racist program, it asked for NAWSA's endorsement. Shaw refused, setting a limit on how far the organization was willing to go to accommodate southerners with overtly racist views. Shaw said the organization would not adopt policies that "advocated the exclusion of any race or class from the right of suffrage."

In 1907, partly in reaction to NAWSA's "society plan", which was designed to appeal to upper-class women, Harriet Stanton Blatch, daughter of Elizabeth Cady Stanton, formed a competing organization called the Equality League of Self-Supporting Women. Later known as the Women's Political Union, its membership was based on working women, both professional and industrial. Blatch had recently returned to the United States after several years in England, where she had worked with suffrage groups in the early phases of employing militant tactics as part of their campaign. The Equality League gained a following by engaging in activities that many members of the NAWSA initially considered too daring, such as suffrage parades and open air rallies. Blatch said that when she joined the suffrage movement in the U.S., "The only method suggested for furthering the cause was the slow process of education. We were told to organize, organize, organize, to the end of educating, educating, educating public opinion."

In 1908, the National College Equal Suffrage League was formed as an affiliate of the NAWSA. It had its origins in the College Equal Suffrage League, which was formed in Boston in 1900 at a time when there were relatively few college students in the NAWSA. It was established by Maud Wood Park, who later helped create similar groups in 30 states. Park later became a prominent leader of the NAWSA.

By 1908, Catt was once again at the forefront of activity. She and her co-workers developed a detailed plan to unite the various suffrage associations in New York City (and later in the entire state) in an organization modeled on political machines like Tammany Hall. In 1909, they founded the Woman Suffrage Party (WSP) at a convention attended by over a thousand delegates and alternates. By 1910, the WSP had 20,000 members and a four-room headquarters. Shaw was not entirely comfortable with the independent initiatives of the WSP, but Catt and other of its leaders remained loyal to the NAWSA, its parent organization.

In 1909, Frances Squires Potter, a NAWSA member from Chicago, proposed the creation of suffrage community centers called "political settlements." Reminiscent of the social settlement houses, such as Hull House in Chicago, their purpose was to educate the public about suffrage and the practical details of political activity at the local level. The political settlements established by the WSP included suffrage schools that provided training in public speaking to suffrage organizers.

Public sentiment toward the suffrage movement improved dramatically during this period. Working for suffrage came to be seen as a respectable activity for middle-class women. By 1910, NAWSA membership had jumped to 117,000. The NAWSA established its first permanent headquarters that year in New York City, previously having operated mainly out of the homes of its officers. Maud Wood Park, who had been away in Europe for two years, received a letter that year from one of her co-workers in the College Equal Suffrage League who described the new atmosphere by saying, "the movement which when we got into it had about as much energy as a dying kitten, is now a big, virile, threatening thing" and is "actually fashionable now."

The change in public sentiment was reflected in efforts to win suffrage at the state level. In 1896, only four states, all of them in the West, allowed women to vote. From 1896 to 1910, there were six state campaigns for suffrage, and they all failed. The tide began to turn in 1910 when suffrage was won in the state of Washington, followed by California in 1911, Oregon, Kansas and Arizona in 1912, and others afterwards.

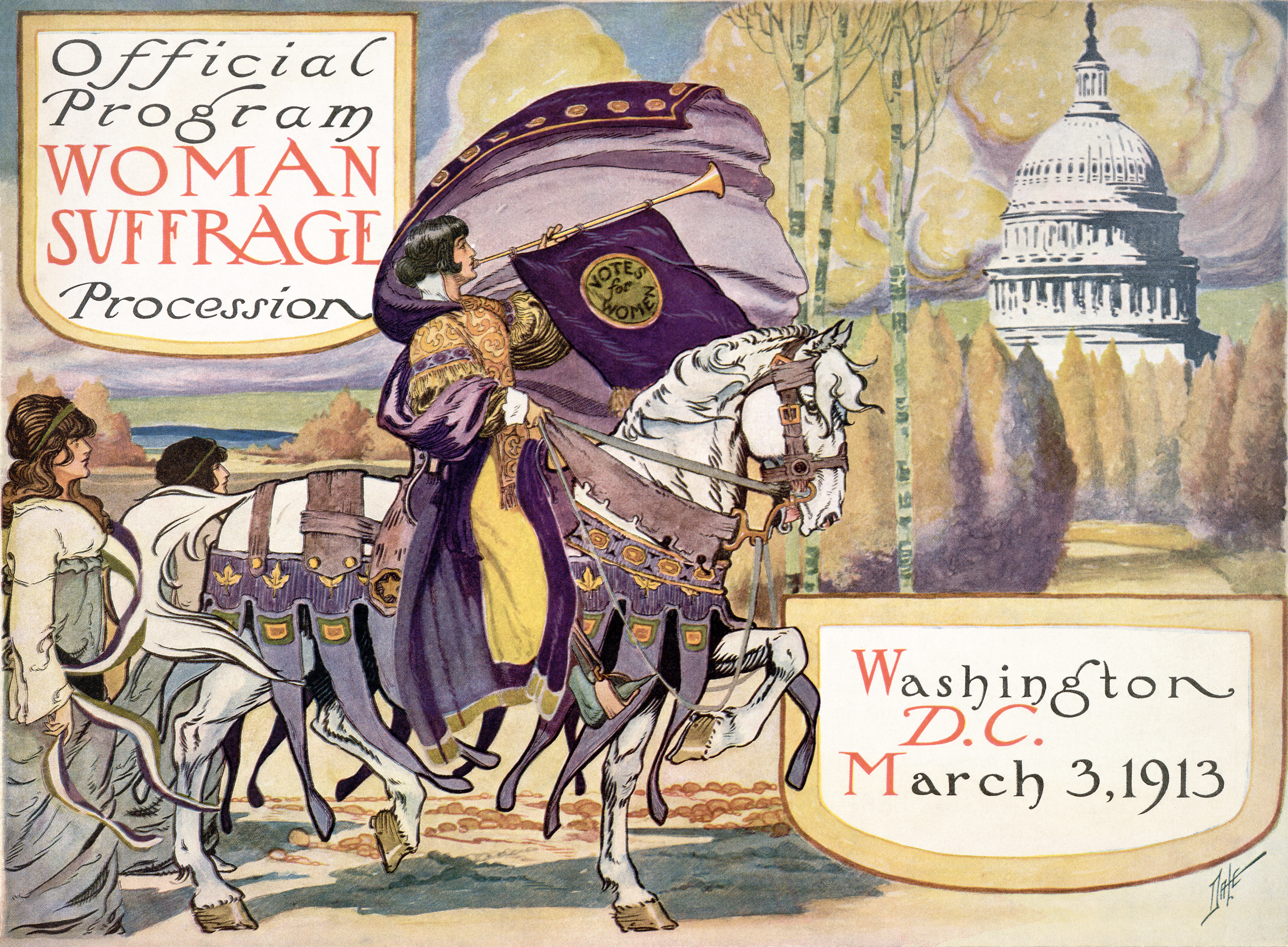
Program for NAWSA's 1913 Woman Suffrage Procession in Washington

In 1912, W. E. B. Du Bois, president of the National Association for the Advancement of Colored People (NAACP), publicly challenged NAWSA's reluctance to accept black women. The NAWSA responded in a cordial way, inviting him to speak at its next convention and publishing his speech as a pamphlet. Nonetheless, the NAWSA continued to minimize the role of black suffragists. It accepted some black women as members and some black societies as auxiliaries, but its general practice was to turn such requests politely away. This was partly because attitudes of racial superiority were the norm among white Americans of that era, and partly because the NAWSA believed it had little hope of achieving a national amendment without at least some support from southern states that practiced racial segregation.

NAWSA's strategy at that point was to gain suffrage for women on a state-by-state basis until it achieved a critical mass of voters that could push through a suffrage amendment at the national level. In 1913, the Southern States Woman Suffrage Committee was formed in an attempt to stop that process from moving past the state level. It was led by Kate Gordon, who had been the NAWSA's corresponding secretary from 1901 to 1909. Gordon, who was from the southern state of Louisiana, supported women's suffrage, but opposed the idea of a federal suffrage amendment, charging that it would violate states' rights. She said that empowering federal authorities to enforce a constitutional right for women to vote in the South could lead to similar enforcement of the constitutional right of African Americans to vote there, a right that was being evaded, and, in her opinion, rightly so. Her committee was too small to seriously affect the NAWSA's direction, but her public condemnation of the proposed amendment, expressed in terms of vehement racism, deepened fissures within the organization.

Despite the rapid growth in NAWSA membership, discontent with Shaw grew. Her tendency to overreact to those who differed with her had the effect of increasing organizational friction. Several members resigned from executive board in 1910, and the board saw significant changes in its composition every year after that through 1915.

In 1914, Senator John Shafroth introduced a federal amendment that would require state legislatures to put women's suffrage on the state ballot if eight percent of the voters signed a petition to that effect. The NAWSA endorsed the proposed amendment, whereupon the CU accused it of abandoning the drive for a national suffrage amendment. Amid confusion among the membership, delegates at the 1914 convention directed their dissatisfaction at Shaw. Shaw had considered declining the presidency in 1914, but decided to run again. In 1915, she announced that she would not be running for reelection.

== Relocation to Warren, Ohio ==
For several years, Harriet Taylor Upton led the woman suffragist movement in Trumbull County, Ohio. In 1880, Upton's father was elected as a member of the United States Congress as a Republican from Ohio. This connection provided Upton the opportunity to meet Susan B. Anthony, who brought Upton into the suffragist movement.

In 1894, Upton was elected as the NAWSA's treasurer. In addition, Upton served as president of the Ohio association of the national association, from 1899 to 1908 and 1911–1920. Upton helped relocate the national headquarters for the NAWSA to her home in Warren, Ohio, in 1903. According to the Tribune Chronicle, "it was only supposed to be a temporary move, but it lasted six years. Susan B. Anthony, noted leader of the women's movement, visited Warren many times, including a 1904 trip to attend a national women's rights meeting here."

During this period, the nation's attention regarding women's rights was focused on Warren. The association's offices were located on the ground level of the Trumbull Court House, a building currently occupied by the Probate Court. While the headquarters left the Upton House around 1910, Warren remained active in the suffrage movement. The people of Warren were active in various programs of the national movement for years, until the 19th Amendment was ratified by a sufficient number of states, and authorized by President Wilson in 1920.

In 1993, the Upton House joined the list of historic landmarks.

== Split in the movement ==
A serious challenge to the NAWSA leadership began to develop after a young activist named Alice Paul returned to the U.S. from England in 1910, where she had been part of the militant wing of the suffrage movement. She had been jailed there and had endured forced feedings after going on a hunger strike. Joining the NAWSA, she became the person most responsible for reviving interest within the suffrage movement for a national amendment, which for years had been overshadowed by campaigns for suffrage at the state level.

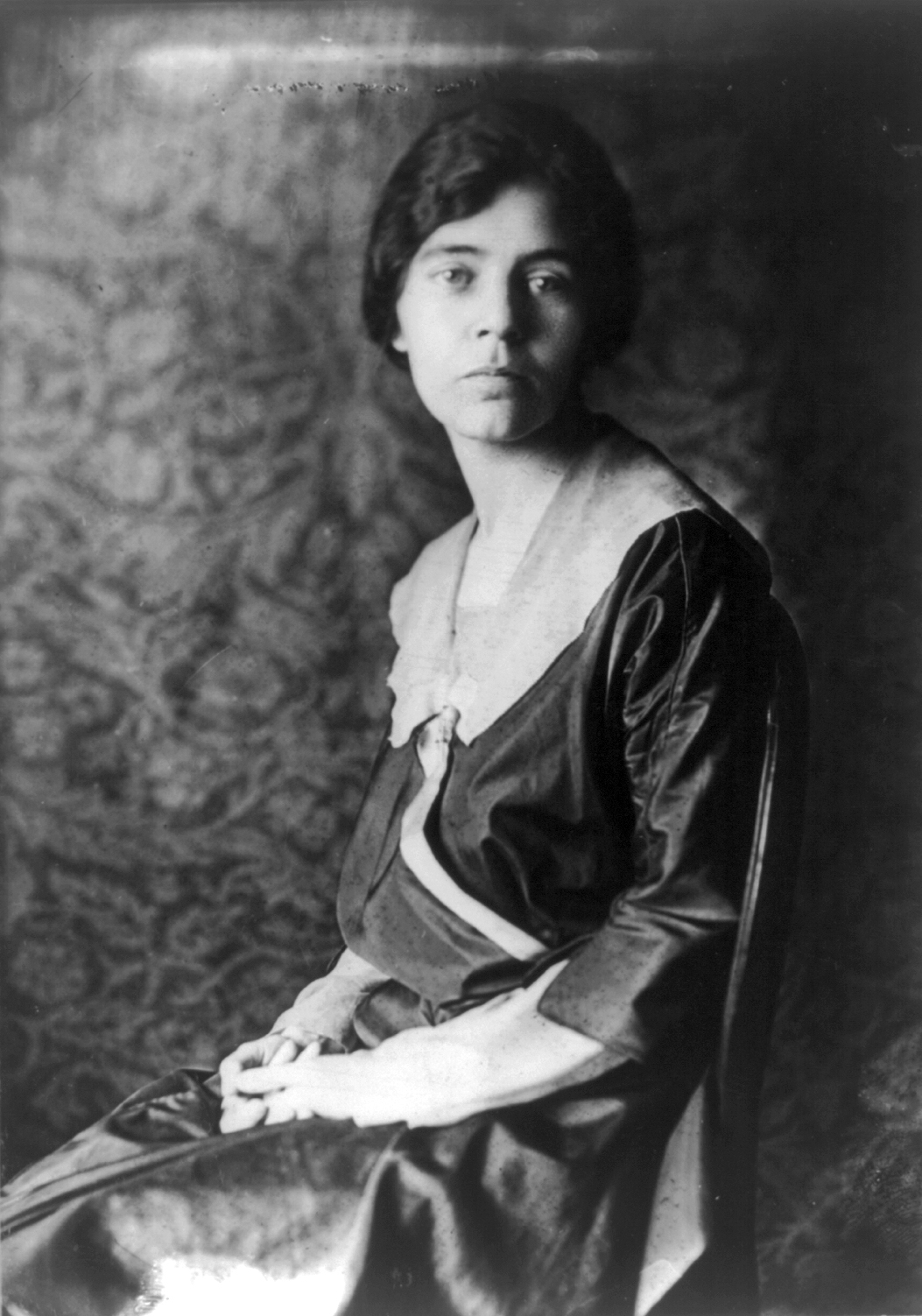
Alice Paul

From Shaw's point of view, the time was right for a renewed emphasis on a suffrage amendment. Gordon and Clay, the most persistent adversaries of a federal suffrage amendment within NAWSA, had been out-maneuvered by their opponents and no longer held national posts. In 1912, Alice Paul was appointed chair of NAWSA's Congressional Committee and charged with reviving the drive for a women's suffrage amendment. In 1913, she and her coworker Lucy Burns organized the Woman Suffrage Procession, a suffrage parade in Washington on the day before Woodrow Wilson's inauguration as president. Onlookers who opposed the march turned the event into a near riot, which ended only when a cavalry unit of the army was brought in to restore order. Public outrage over the incident, which cost the chief of police his job, brought publicity to the movement and gave it fresh momentum.

Paul troubled NAWSA leaders by arguing that because Democrats would not act to enfranchise women even though they controlled the presidency and both houses of Congress, the suffrage movement should work for the defeat of all Democrats regardless of an individual candidate's position on suffrage. NAWSA's policy was to follow the opposite approach, supporting any candidate who endorsed suffrage, regardless of political party. In 1913, Paul and Burns formed the Congressional Union (CU) to work solely for a national amendment and sent organizers into states that already had NAWSA organizations. The relationship between the CU and the NAWSA became unclear and troubled over time.

At the NAWSA convention in 1913, Paul and her allies demanded that the organization focus its efforts on a federal suffrage amendment. The convention instead empowered the executive board to limit the CU's ability to contravene NAWSA policies. After negotiations failed to resolve their differences, the NAWSA removed Paul as head of its Congressional Committee. By February, 1914, the NAWSA and the CU had effectively separated into two independent organizations.

Blatch merged her Women's Political Union into the CU. That organization in turn became the basis for the National Woman's Party (NWP), which Paul formed in 1916. Once again there were two competing national women's suffrage organizations, but the result this time was something like a division of labor. The NAWSA burnished its image of respectability and engaged in highly organized lobbying at both the national and state levels. The smaller NWP also engaged in lobbying but became increasingly known for activities that were dramatic and confrontational, most often in the national capital.

== Second Catt presidency, 1915-1920 ==
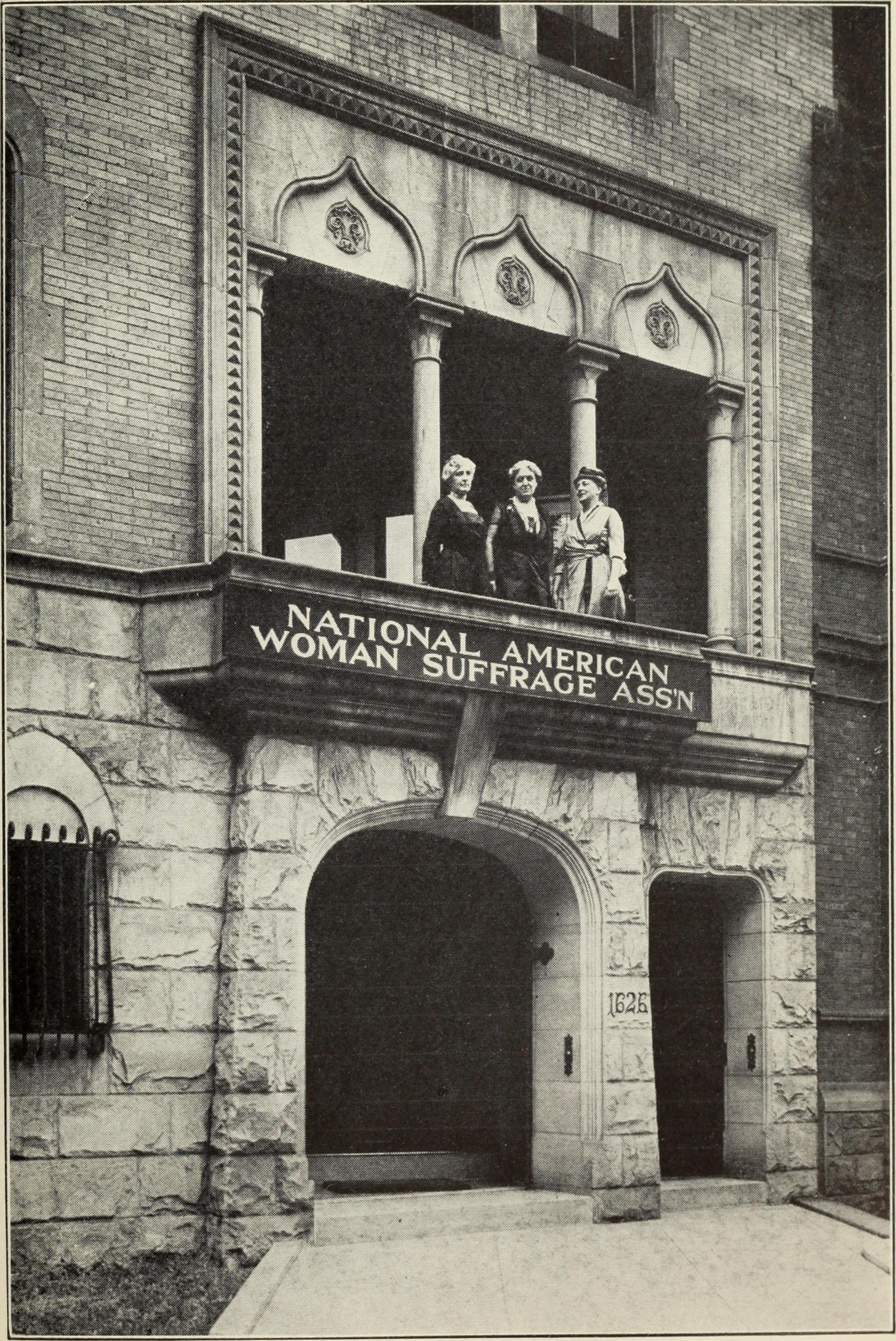
Helen Hamilton Gardener, Carrie Chapman Catt and Maud Wood Park (from left to right) on the balcony of Suffrage House, the Washington headquarters of the National American Woman Suffrage Association

Carrie Chapman Catt, the NAWSA's previous president, was the obvious choice to replace Anna Howard Shaw, but Catt was leading the New York State Woman Suffrage Party, which was in the early stages of a crucial suffrage campaign in that state. The prevailing belief in the NAWSA was that success in a large eastern state would be the tipping point for the national campaign. New York was the largest state in the union, and victory there was a real possibility. Catt agreed to turn the New York work over to others and to accept the NAWSA presidency in December, 1915 on the condition that she could name her own executive board, which previously had always been elected by the annual convention. She appointed to the board women of independent means who could work for the movement full-time.

Backed by an increased level of commitment and unity in the national office, Catt sent its officers into the field to assess the state of the organization and start the process of reorganizing it into a more centralized and efficient operation. Catt described the NAWSA as a camel with a hundred humps, each with a blind driver trying to lead the way. She provided a new sense of direction by sending out a stream of communications to state and local affiliates with policy directives, organizational initiatives and detailed plans of work.

The NAWSA previously had devoted much of its effort to educating the public about suffrage, and it had made a significant impact. Women's suffrage had become a major national issue, and the NAWSA was in the process of becoming the nation's largest voluntary organization, with two million members. Catt built on that foundation to convert the NAWSA into an organization that operated primarily as a political pressure group.

=== 1916 ===
At an executive board meeting in March, 1916, Catt described the organization's dilemma by saying, "The Congressional Union is drawing off from the National Association those women who feel it is possible to work for suffrage by the Federal route only. Certain workers in the south are being antagonized because the National is continuing to work for the Federal Amendment. The combination has produced a great muddle". Catt believed that NAWSA's policy of working primarily on state-by-state campaigns was nearing its limits. Some states appeared unlikely ever to approve women's suffrage, in some cases because state laws made constitutional revision extremely difficult, and in others, especially in the Deep South, because opposition was simply too strong. Catt refocused the organization on a national suffrage amendment while continuing to conduct state campaigns where success was a realistic possibility.

When the conventions of the Democratic and Republican parties met in June, 1916, suffragists applied pressure to both. Catt was invited to express her views in a speech to the Republican convention in Chicago. An anti-suffragist spoke after Catt, and as she was telling the convention that women did not want to vote, a crowd of suffragists burst into the hall and filled the aisles. They were soaking wet, having marched in heavy rain for several blocks in a parade led by two elephants. When the flustered anti-suffragist concluded her remarks, the suffragists led a cheer for their cause. At the Democratic convention a week later in St. Louis, suffragists packed the galleries and made their views known during the debate on suffrage.

Both party conventions endorsed women's suffrage but only at the state level, which meant that different states might implement it in different ways and in some cases not at all. Having expected more, Catt called an Emergency Convention, moving the date of the 1916 convention from December to September to begin organizing a renewed push for the federal amendment. The convention initiated a strategic shift by adopting Catt's "Winning Plan". This plan mandated work toward the national suffrage amendment as the priority for the entire organization and authorized the creation of a professional lobbying team to support this goal in Washington. It authorized the executive board to specify a plan of work toward this goal for each state and to take over that work if the state organization refused to comply. It agreed to fund state suffrage campaigns only if they met strict requirements that were designed to eliminate efforts with little chance of succeeding. Catt's plan included milestones for achieving a women's suffrage amendment by 1922. Gordon, whose states' rights approach had been decisively defeated, exclaimed to a friend, "A well-oiled steam roller has ironed this convention flat!"

President Wilson, whose attitude toward women's suffrage was evolving, spoke at the 1916 NAWSA convention. He had been considered an opponent of suffrage when he was governor of New Jersey, but in 1915 he announced that he was traveling from the White House back to his home state to vote in favor of it in New Jersey's state referendum. He spoke favorably of suffrage at the NAWSA convention but stopped short of supporting the suffrage amendment. Charles Evans Hughes, his opponent in the presidential election that year, declined to speak at the convention, but he went farther than Wilson by endorsing the suffrage amendment.

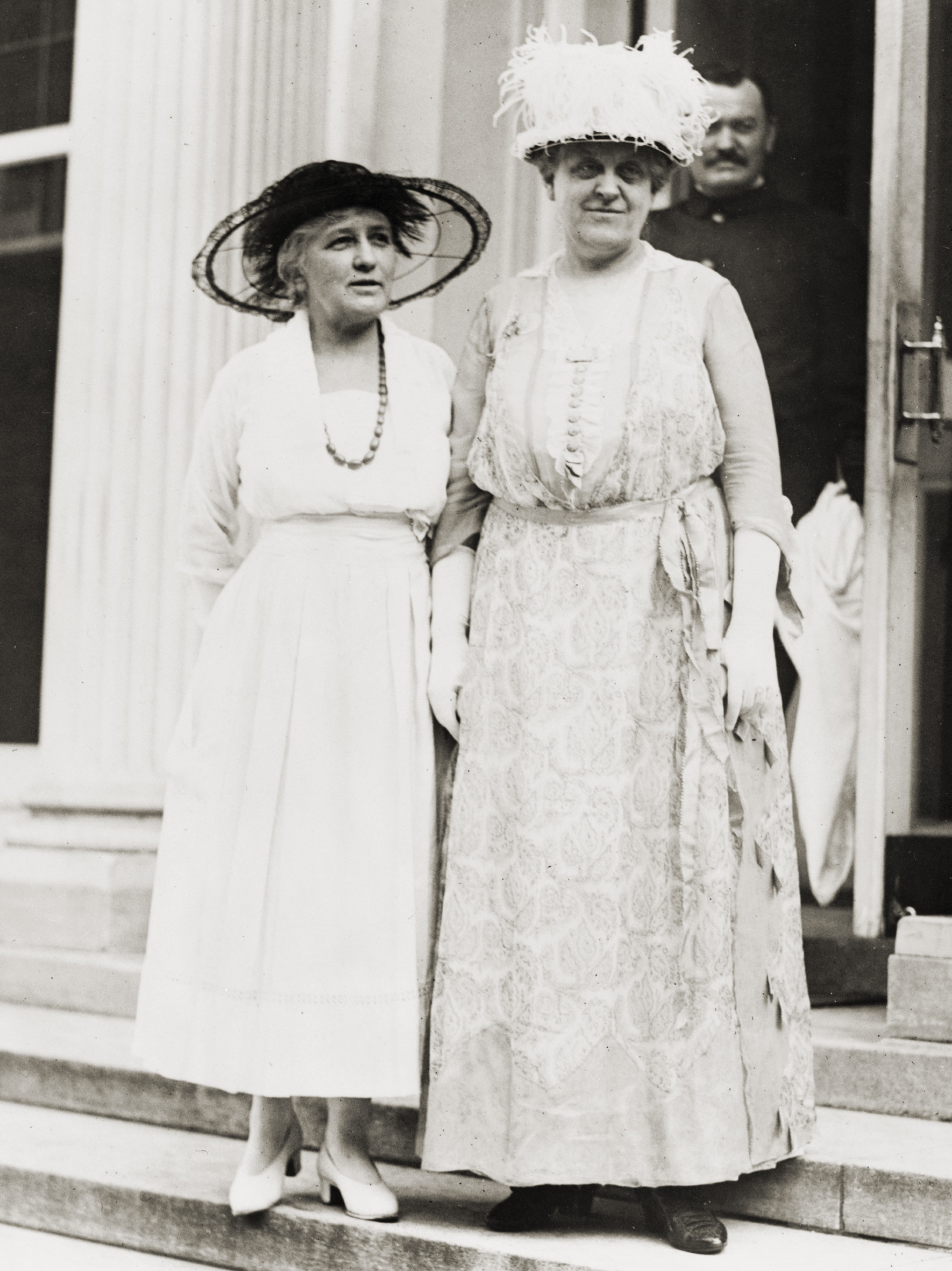
Carrie Chapman Catt (right) exiting the White House with Helen Hamilton Gardener

NAWSA's Congressional Committee had been in disarray ever since Alice Paul was removed from it in 1913. Catt reorganized the committee and appointed Maud Wood Park as its head in December, 1916. Park and her lieutenant Helen Hamilton Gardener created what became known as the "Front Door Lobby", so named by a journalist because it operated openly, avoiding the traditional lobbying methods of "backstairs" dealing. A headquarters for the lobbying effort was established in a dilapidated mansion known as Suffrage House. NAWSA lobbyists lodged there and coordinated their activities with daily conferences in its meeting rooms.

In 1916 the NAWSA purchased the Woman's Journal from Alice Stone Blackwell. The newspaper had been established in 1870 by Blackwell's mother, Lucy Stone, and had served as the primary voice of the suffrage movement most of the time since then. It had significant limitations, however. It was a small operation, with Blackwell herself doing most of the work, and with much of its reporting centered on the eastern part of the country at a time when a national newspaper was needed. After the transfer, it was renamed Woman Citizen and merged with The Woman Voter, the journal of the Woman Suffrage Party of New York City, and with National Suffrage News, the former journal of the NAWSA. The newspaper's masthead declared itself to be the NAWSA's official organ.

=== 1917 ===
In 1917 Catt received a bequest of $900,000 from Mrs. Frank (Miriam) Leslie to be used as she thought best for the women's suffrage movement. Catt allocated most of the funds to the NAWSA, with $400,000 applied toward upgrading the Woman Citizen.

In January 1917, Alice Paul's NWP began picketing the White House with banners that demanded women's suffrage. The police eventually arrested over 200 of the Silent Sentinels, many of whom went on hunger strike after being imprisoned. The prison authorities force fed them, creating an uproar that fueled public debate on women's suffrage.

When the U.S. entered World War I in April 1917, the NAWSA cooperated with the war effort. Shaw was appointed as head of the Women's Committee for the Council of National Defense, which was established by the federal government to coordinate resources for the war and to promote public morale. Catt and two other NAWSA members were appointed to its executive committee. The NWP, by contrast, took no part in the war effort and charged that the NAWSA did so at the expense of suffrage work.

In April 1917, Jeannette Rankin of Montana took her seat as the first woman in Congress, having previously served as lobbyist and field secretary for the NAWSA. Rankin voted against the declaration of war.

In November 1917, the suffrage movement achieved a major victory when a referendum to enfranchise women passed by a large margin in New York, the most populous state in the country. The powerful Tammany Hall political machine, which had previously opposed suffrage, took a neutral stance on this referendum, partly because the wives of several Tammany Hall leaders played prominent roles in the suffrage campaign.

=== 1918–19 ===
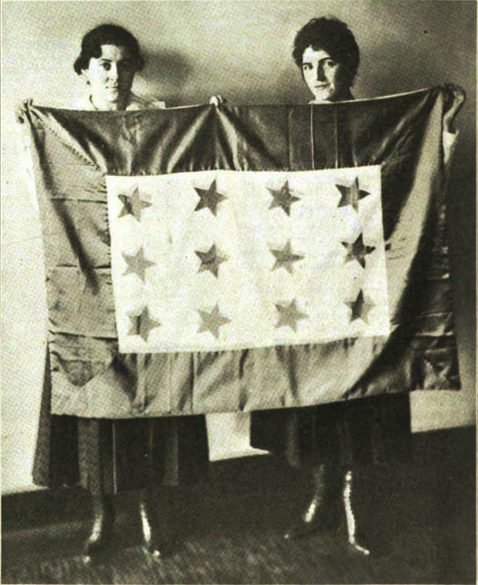
Suffrage service flag of the NAWSA (1918)

The House passed the suffrage amendment for the first time in January, 1918, but the Senate delayed its debate on the measure until September. President Wilson took the unusual step of appearing before the Senate to speak on the issue, asking for passage of the amendment as a war measure. The Senate, however, defeated the measure by two votes. The NAWSA launched a campaign to unseat four senators who had voted against the amendment, assembling a coalition of forces that included labor unions and prohibitionists. Two of those four senators were defeated in the federal elections in November.

NAWSA held its Golden Jubilee Convention at the Statler Hotel in St. Louis, Missouri in March 1919. President Catt gave the opening address, in which she urged the delegates to create a league of women voters. A resolution was passed to form this league as a separate unit of NAWSA, with membership coming from states who allowed women to vote. The league was charged with achieving full suffrage and consideration of legislation that affected women in states where they were able to vote. On the last day of the convention, the Missouri senate passed legislation giving women the right to vote in presidential elections in Missouri and a resolution to submit a constitutional amendment for full suffrage. In June of that year, the Nineteenth Amendment was passed.

=== Passage of the Nineteenth Amendment ===
After the elections, Wilson called a special session of Congress, which passed the suffrage amendment on June 4, 1919. The struggle now passed to the state legislatures, three-fourths of which would need to ratify the amendment before it would become law.

Catt and the NAWSA executive board had been planning their work in support of the ratification effort since April 1918, over a year before Congress passed the amendment. Ratification committees had already been established in state capitals, each with its own budget and plan of work. Immediately after Congress passed the amendment, Suffrage House and the federal lobbying operation were shut down and resources were diverted to the ratification drive. Catt had a sense of urgency, expecting a slowdown in reform energy after the war, which had ended seven months earlier. Many local suffrage societies had disbanded in states where women could already vote, making it more difficult to organize a quick ratification.

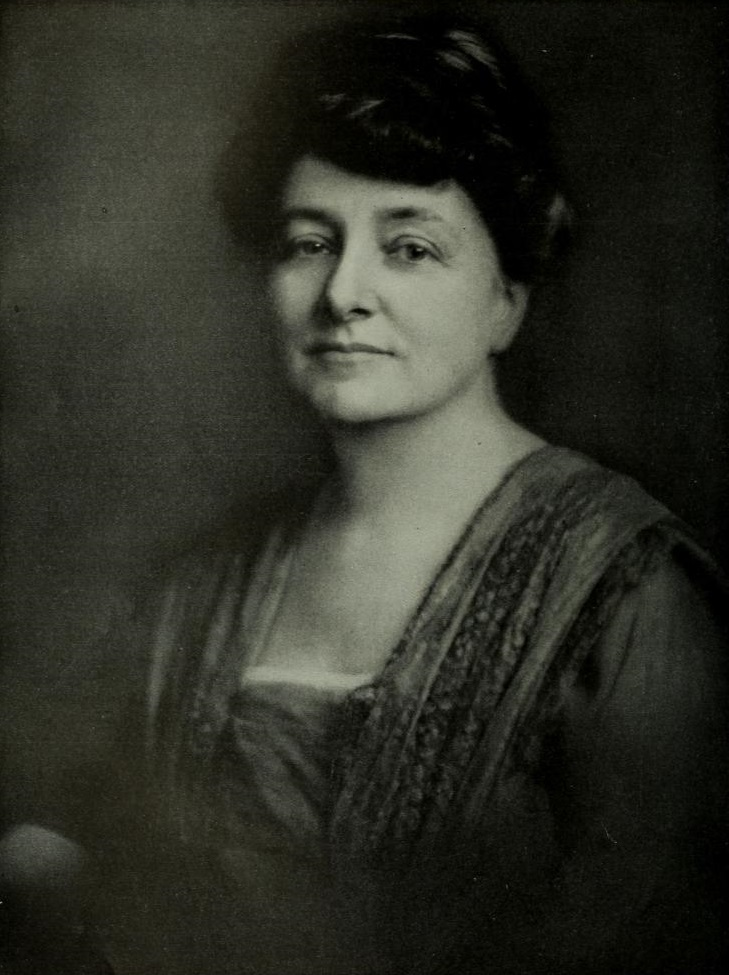
Maud Wood Park

By the end of 1919, women effectively could vote for president in states that had a majority of electoral votes. Political leaders who were convinced that women's suffrage was inevitable began to pressure local and national legislators to support it so their party could claim credit for it in future elections. The conventions of both the Democratic and Republican Parties endorsed the amendment in June, 1920.

Former NAWSA members Kate Gordon and Laura Clay organized opposition to the amendment's ratification in the South. They had resigned from the NAWSA in the fall of 1918 at the executive board's request because of their public statements in opposition to a federal amendment. Only three Southern or border states, Arkansas, Texas, and Tennessee, ratified the 19th Amendment, with Tennessee being the crucial 36th state to ratify.

The Nineteenth Amendment, the women's suffrage amendment, became the law of the land on August 26, 1920, when it was certified by the United States Secretary of State.

=== Transition into the League of Women Voters ===
Six months before the Nineteenth Amendment was ratified, the NAWSA held its last convention. That convention created the League of Women Voters as the NAWSA's successor on February 14, 1920, with Maud Wood Park, former head of the NAWSA's Congressional Committee, as its president. The League of Women Voters was formed to help women play a larger part in public affairs as they won the right to vote. It was meant to help women exercise their right to vote. Before 1973 only women could join the league.

=== State Organizations working with the NAWSA ===
- Alabama - Alabama Equal Suffrage Association.
- Arizona - Arizona Equal Suffrage Campaign Committee
- Arkansas - Arkansas Woman Suffrage Association; and, Political Equality League
- Delaware - Delaware Equal Suffrage Association.
- Hawaii - National Women's Equal Suffrage Association of Hawai'i.
- Indiana - Women's Franchise League of Indiana
- Kentucky - Kentucky Equal Rights Association
- Maine - Maine Women's Suffrage Association.
- Nevada - Nevada Equal Franchise Society.
- New Mexico - Santa Fe chapter of NAWSA.
- North Dakota - North Dakota Votes for Women League.
- Texas - Texas Equal Suffrage Association.
- Virginia - Equal Suffrage League of Virginia
- West Virginia - West Virginia Equal Suffrage Association

== See also ==
- List of suffragists and suffragettes
- List of women's rights activists
- Timeline of women's suffrage
- Timeline of women's suffrage in the United States
- Women's suffrage organizations

== Bibliography ==
- Adams, Katherine H. and Keene, Michael L.. Alice Paul and the American Suffrage Campaign. Urbana: University of Illinois Press. ISBN 978-0-252-07471-4
- Anthony, Susan B. (1902). Anthony, Susan B.; Harper, Ida Husted (eds.). The History of Woman Suffrage. Vol. 4. Indianapolis: The Hollenbeck Press.
- Barry, Kathleen (1988). Susan B. Anthony: A Biography of a Singular Feminist. New York: Ballantine Books. ISBN 0-345-36549-6.
- Boylan, Anne (2016). Women's Rights in the United States: A History in Documents. New York: Oxford University Press. ISBN 978-0-195-33829-4.
- Cullen-DuPont, Kathryn (2000). The Encyclopedia of Women's History in America (second ed.). New York: Facts on File. ISBN 0-8160-4100-8.
- DuBois, Ellen Carol (1978). Feminism and Suffrage: The Emergence of an Independent Women's Movement in America, 1848–1869. Ithaca, NY: Cornell University Press. ISBN 0-8014-8641-6.
- DuBois, Ellen Carol, ed. (1992). The Elizabeth Cady Stanton–Susan B. Anthony Reader. Boston: Northwestern University Press. ISBN 1-55553-143-1.
- Flexner, Eleanor (1959). Century of Struggle. Cambridge, MA: Belknap Press of Harvard University Press. ISBN 978-0674106536.
- Fowler, Robert Booth (1986). Carrie Catt: Feminist Politician. Boston: Northeastern University Press. ISBN 0-930350-86-3.
- Franzen, Trisha (2014). Anna Howard Shaw: The Work of Woman Suffrage. Urbana: University of Illinois Press. ISBN 978-0-252-07962-7.
- Freeman, Jo (2008). We Will Be Heard: Women's Struggles for Political Power in the United States. New York: Rowman & Littlefield Publishers Inc. ISBN 978-0-7425-5608-9.
- Frost-Knappman, Elizabeth; Cullen-DuPont, Kathryn (2009). Women's Suffrage in America. New York: Facts on File. ISBN 978-0-8160-5693-4.
- Gordon, Ann D., ed. (2009). The Selected Papers of Elizabeth Cady Stanton and Susan B. Anthony: Their Place Inside the Body-Politic, 1887 to 1895. Vol. 5 of 6. New Brunswick, NJ: Rutgers University Press. ISBN 978-0-8135-2321-7.
- Graham, Sara Hunter (1996). Woman Suffrage and the New Democracy. New Haven: Yale University Press. ISBN 0-300-06346-6.
- Griffith, Elisabeth (1984). In Her Own Right: The Life of Elizabeth Cady Stanton. Oxford University Press. ISBN 9780195034400.
- Harper, Ida Husted (1922). The History of Woman Suffrage. New York: J.J. Little & Ives Company.
- McMillen, Sally Gregory (2008). Seneca Falls and the Origins of the Women's Rights Movement. New York: Oxford University Press. ISBN 978-0-19-518265-1.
- McMillen, Sally Gregory (2015). Lucy Stone: An Unapologetic Life. New York: Oxford University Press. ISBN 978-0-19-977839-3.
- Rakow, Lana F.; Kramarae, Cheris, eds. (2001). The Revolution in Words: Righting Women 1868–1871. Vol. 4 of Women's Source Library. New York: Routledge. ISBN 978-0-415-25689-6.
- Scott, Anne Firor; Scott, Andrew MacKay (1982). One Half the People: The Fight for Woman Suffrage. Chicago: University of Illinois Press. ISBN 0-252-01005-1.
- Stanton, Elizabeth Cady; Anthony, Susan B.; Gage, Matilda Joslyn; Harper, Ida (1881–1922). History of Woman Suffrage in six volumes. Rochester, NY: Susan B. Anthony (Charles Mann Press).
- Tetrault, Lisa (2014). The Myth of Seneca Falls: Memory and the Women's Suffrage Movement, 1848-1898. University of North Carolina Press. ISBN 978-1-4696-1427-4.
- Van Voris, Jacqueline (1987). Carrie Chapman Catt: A Public Life. The Feminists Press at the City University of New York. ISBN 978-1-55861-139-9.
- Walton, Mary. A Woman's Crusade: Alice Paul and the Battle for the Ballot. New York: Palgrave Macmillan, 2010. ISBN 978-0-230-61175-7
- Wheeler, Marjorie Spruill (1993). New Women of the New South: The Leaders of the Woman Suffrage Movement in the Southern States. New York: Oxford University Press. ISBN 0-19-507583-8.
