= Kate M. Gordon =

American suffragist (1861–1932)

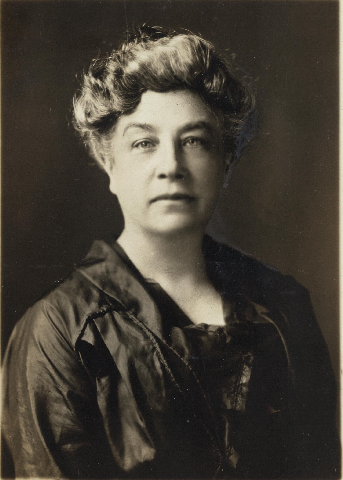
- Gordon in 1913
- Born: July 14, 1861; New Orleans, Louisiana, Confederate States
- Died: August 24, 1932 (aged 71); New Orleans, Louisiana, United States
- Resting place: Metairie Cemetery
- Occupation: Suffragist
- Known for: Organizer of the Southern States Woman Suffrage Conference

Kate M. Gordon (1861 – 1932) was an American suffragist, civic leader, and one of the leading advocates of women's voting rights in the Southern United States. Gordon was the organizer of the Southern States Woman Suffrage Conference and directed the 1918 campaign for woman suffrage in the state of Louisiana, the first such statewide effort in the American South.

== Early years ==
Kate M. Gordon was born July 14, 1861, in New Orleans, Louisiana, the daughter of George Hume Gordon, a Scottish-born schoolmaster, and Margaret (Galiece) Gordon. She had two sisters, Jean and Fanny, as well as two brothers, George M. and W. A. Gordon. Kate's mother was herself an early advocate of women's right to vote, having attended a women's rights meeting in New York as early as 1853. Her father was similarly committed to the principle of equal rights between women and men.

== Career ==
Gordon initially became involved in the women's rights movement in 1896 when she heard a lecture by Colorado suffragist Mary C. C. Bradford at a local Unitarian meeting. Soon after Gordon joined the pioneer New Orleans women's rights organization, the Portia Club, organized in 1892, and joined with her sister Jean and other local women in establishing the Era (Equal Rights Association) Club that same year. The two New Orleans–based organizations would subsequently merge to form the Louisiana State Suffrage Association. The first president of the Association was Evelyn W. Ordway, with whom Gordon had worked in the Era Club. Gordon would succeed Ordway, headed the Association from 1904 until 1913.

Gordon's first public organizing effort came in 1899, when she turned out women entitled vote by virtue of being property taxpayers in a special bond election to finance improvements in New Orleans' sewage and drainage system—a particularly critical concern in the city, much of which lay below sea level. Through the Era Club, a Women's Sewerage and Drainage League was established, with Gordon taking her place at the head of this electoral association. In large measure through Gordon's efforts, the bond measure was passed over conservative opposition.

In 1900, she addressed the annual convention of the National American Woman Suffrage Association (NAWSA), where she met new president of the organization Carrie Chapman Catt. Catt was impressed with Gordon and when a vacancy occurred as the organization's national corresponding secretary in 1901, Gordon was tapped to fill the position. She would continue to serve in that role until 1909.

After leaving NAWSA in 1909, Gordon returned to her native New Orleans, where she became engaged in establishing the first hospital in the state of Louisiana for the treatment of victims of tuberculosis. Gordon worked tirelessly raising funds for Camp Hygiea, located near Covington, Louisiana, and for the Louisiana Anti-Tuberculosis Hospital in New Orleans. She also served as Secretary of the Louisiana Anti-Tuberculosis Society and as Vice President of the New Orleans Anti-Tuberculosis League.

She attended and made a presentation at the Kentucky Equal Rights Association's annual meeting in Louisville in 1911. In 1913, Gordon had returned full-time to activity on the issue of women's suffrage. By this time Gordon had shifted her thinking from top-down national voting rights change—proposed constitutional amendments having been introduced unsuccessfully in every Congressional session since that of 1868—to a state and regional perspective. In November 1913 she was a key organizer of the Southern States Woman Suffrage Conference, of which she would serve as president until its termination in 1917. She was also editor of the group's official organ, the New Southern Citizen.

Although an outspoken advocate of women's right to vote, Gordon did not believe that this right should be created by constitutional amendment, instead favoring the establishment of voting rights on a state by state basis. When the Nineteenth Amendment to the United States Constitution was submitted in June 1919, Gordon—somewhat astonishingly—stood in opposition to ratification of the proposal. Such a dissonant states' rights perspective generated controversy. During her life Gordon also drew criticism from many of her peers for expressing barely concealed racist views.

Gordon assisted in establishing the New Orleans Anti-Tuberculosis Hospital in 1926, serving as the latter's vice president. She also was superintendent of the Milen Home for Feeble-minded Girls from February 1931 until the time of her death.

== Death and legacy ==
Gordon died August 24, 1932, in New Orleans from a cerebral hemorrhage and was buried in the Metairie Cemetery in New Orleans. She was 71 years old at the time of her death.
