= Jean Margaret Gordon =

American suffragist and social worker

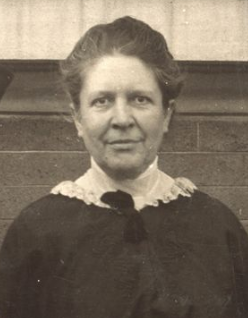
- Born: 1865; New Orleans, Louisiana
- Died: February 24, 1931 (aged 65–66)
- Occupation: Social worker
- Known for: President of the Louisiana Woman Suffrage Association (1913-1920); First factory inspector of New Orleans

Jean Margaret Gordon (1865 – February 24, 1931) was an American suffragist, social worker, civic leader, and reformer. She served as president of the Louisiana Woman Suffrage Association (1913–20). She was New Orleans's first factory inspector. She also served as president of the board and supervisor of the Alexander Milne Home for Girls. After assisting in the establishment of the School of Applied Sociology, she was its lecturer and field supervisor. Born in New Orleans, she was a daughter of George Hume Gordon, schoolmaster, and Margaret (Galiece) Gordon. There were two sisters, Kate and Fanny, as well as two brothers, George H. and William Andrew Gordon.

Gordon was active in the movement to provide equal restroom access for women and the right to sit for women workers.

== Selected works ==
- Child Labor On the Stage (1911)
