= Elizabeth Fisher Read =

American scholar and suffrage activist

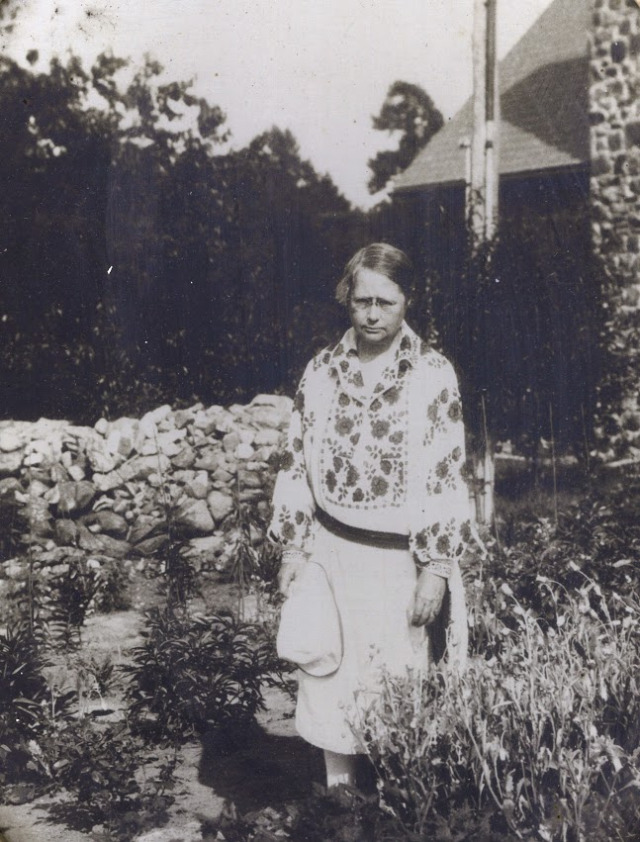
Elizabeth Fisher Read

Elizabeth Fisher Read (1872 – December 13, 1943) was an attorney, scholar, and activist working for women's suffrage and world peace. She was a close friend and political mentor of Eleanor Roosevelt and also served as Roosevelt's attorney and financial advisor.

== Early life ==
Elizabeth Fisher Read was born in New Brighton, Pennsylvania, in 1872, the daughter of George Willis Read and Henrietta A. Miner Read. Her younger sister was editor Georgia Willis Read.

She graduated from Smith College and University of Pennsylvania Law School. Read also earned an M.A. from Columbia University. Columbia did not start regularly admitting female graduate students until 1900, when Read was nearly thirty. The subject of her degree is not known; however, popular subjects of study for Columbia women included psychology, philosophy, and anthropology. Given Read's interests in reform and international relations, it is possible she pursued her graduate work in one of these subjects.

== Career ==
In the 1910s, Read was a Women's Suffrage activist and represented the ideology of the New Woman, financially independent, politically active, and socially emancipated. She was active in social and political causes and was an influential figure in the League of Women Voters in New York City.

Read was a practicing lawyer and had a particular interest in international law. Beginning in about 1923 and continuing until her death twenty years later, she served as director of research for the American Foundation, a group advocating for international cooperation.

Read wrote a book on international law, International Law and International Relations (1925), translated and edited a book on the World Court, and helped Lape edit a book on expert medical testimony. In 1923 she collaborated with Lape and Gustav Frenssen to write Klaus Hinrich Baas: The Story Of A Self-made Man....

== Personal life ==
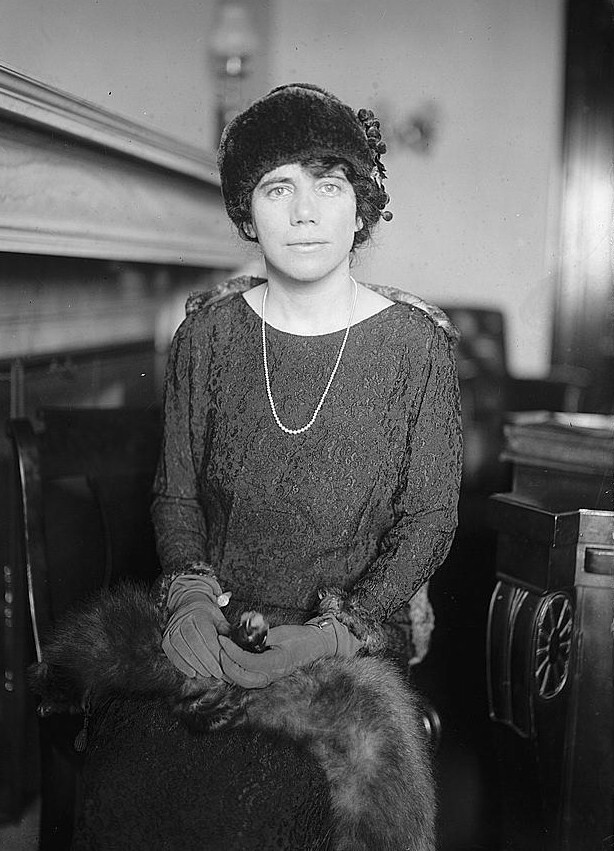
Esther Lape

Read lived with Esther Lape, educator and publicist, in Greenwich Village, at 20 East 11th Street. Despite a plaque noting that Eleanor Roosevelt lived there when she was first lady, the building was actually owned by Lape; Roosevelt rented an apartment for a time. Nearby, at 171 West 12th Street, lived other lesbian couples involved in the Woman's Suffrage movement and of the close-knit circle of friends of Roosevelt: Marion Dickerman and Nancy Cook, Molly Dewson and Polly Porter, and Grace Hutchins and Anna Rochester.

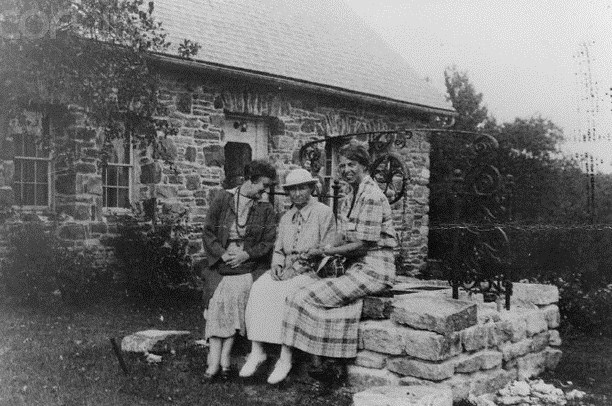
Eleanor Roosevelt (right) with Malvina Thompson and Elizabeth Read at Salt Meadow

Read was Eleanor Roosevelt's friend. They first met in 1920 when Roosevelt became the director of the League of Women Voters' national legislation committee. After 1921, she was her political and feminist mentor, became Roosevelt's personal attorney and financial advisor. With her life partner, Lape, and others, she was part of Roosevelt's support network of female friends.

Read and Lape also owned a country house, Salt Meadow, Westbrook, Connecticut, where Roosevelt was often a guest. In 1972, after Read's death, Lape donated Salt Meadow to the U.S. Fish and Wildlife Service. The estate is currently the Stewart B. McKinney National Wildlife Refuge. Refuge staff are working on a National Register of Historical Places submission for the former Salt Meadow estate that will recognize the same-sex relationship of Lape and Read.

Elizabeth Fisher Read died in New York on December 13, 1943.
