= Esther Lape =

American journalist and suffrage activist (1881–1981)

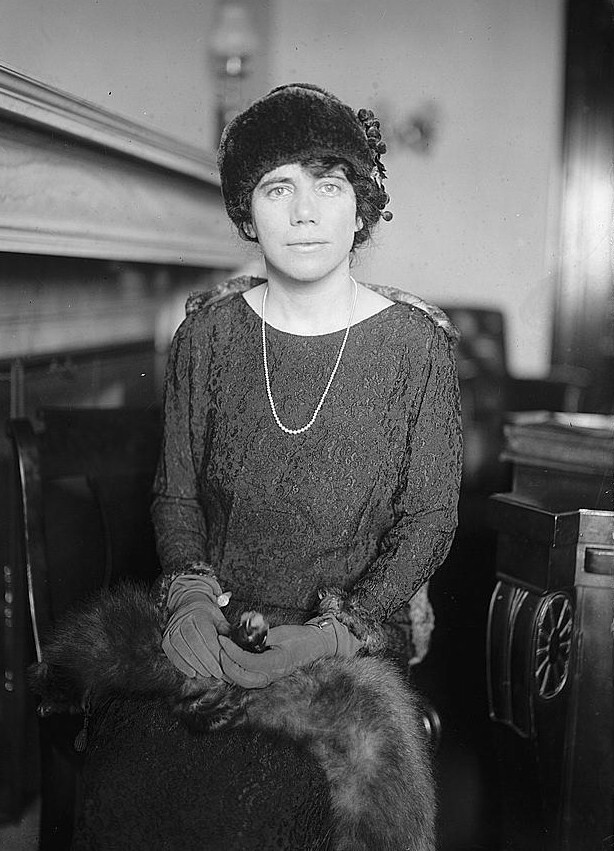
- Born: October 8, 1881; Wilmington, Delaware, U.S.
- Died: May 17, 1981 (aged 99); New York City, New York, U.S.

Academic background
- Education: Bryn Mawr College; Wellesley College

Esther Everett Lape (8 October 1881 – 17 May 1981) was a well-known American peace activist and journalist. She wrote in support of immigration and workers' rights, and between the world wars, she was a vocal advocate for the US participation in the World Court. Lape was associated with the Women's Trade Union League and was one of the founders of the League of Women Voters.

Lape was partnered with attorney Elizabeth Fisher Read from at least 1920 until Read's death in 1943. Lape and Read were both political mentors of Eleanor Roosevelt.

== Career ==
Esther Lape worked as a journalist, researcher, publicist, and teacher, educating the public about the progressive causes she supported, including peace, workers' rights, and feminism. After graduating from college in 1905, she taught English at Swarthmore College, the University of Arizona, Columbia University, and Barnard College.

She was an activist of the Women's Trade Union League and one of the founders of the League of Women Voters.

Raised Quaker, Lape advocated for social justice and international cooperation. In 1923, former publisher Edward Bok established the Bok Peace Prize (a precursor to the American Peace Award), offering $50,000 for the best plan "whereby the United States can take its place and do its share toward preserving world peace." He asked Lape to administer the contest, and she agreed on the condition that Eleanor Roosevelt and Narcissa Cox Vanderlip be permitted to assist her. Of the 22,165 proposals received, the prize was awarded to Charles Levermore. Lape collected what she considered to be twenty of the strongest entries and published them alongside her own analysis in the book Ways to Peace. The book was well received, with the New York Herald Tribune going so far as to claim it the "best thing that came out of the Peace Award."

In 1923, Lape also became the director of the American Foundation for Studies in Government, a public interest group supporting U.S. participation in the World Court. She remained in this position until her retirement in 1956, after which she served on the organization's board of directors. As part of her work for the foundation, Lape promoted U.S. recognition of the Soviet Union in 1933 and studied access to medical care within the United States.

Lape edited a book on expert medical testimony, Medical Research: A Midcentury Survey (1955), sponsored by the American Foundation. In 1923, she collaborated with Read and Gustav Frenssen to Klaus Hinrich Baas: The Story Of A Self-made Man.... Together with Read, Lape published the journal City, State and Nation.

== Personal life ==
Esther Everett Lape was born into a Quaker family in Wilmington, Delaware, on October 8, 1881. She attended public school in Philadelphia, before entering Bryn Mawr College. She eventually transferred to Wellesley College, where she graduated in 1905.

Esther Lape lived with her life partner Elizabeth Read in Greenwich Village, at 20 East 11th Street, where today a plaque says “Eleanor Roosevelt lived here when she was first lady.” The building was actually owned by Lape. Roosevelt, who had met Lape through Read in 1920, rented an apartment for a time. Nearby, at 171 West 12th Street, lived other lesbian couples involved in the Woman's Suffrage movement and of the close-knit circle of friends of Roosevelt: Marion Dickerman and Nancy Cook, Molly Dewson and Polly Porter, Grace Hutchins and Anna Rochester. Lape, with her life partner, Read, and other Roosevelt's female friends, was part of Roosevelt's support network of female friends.

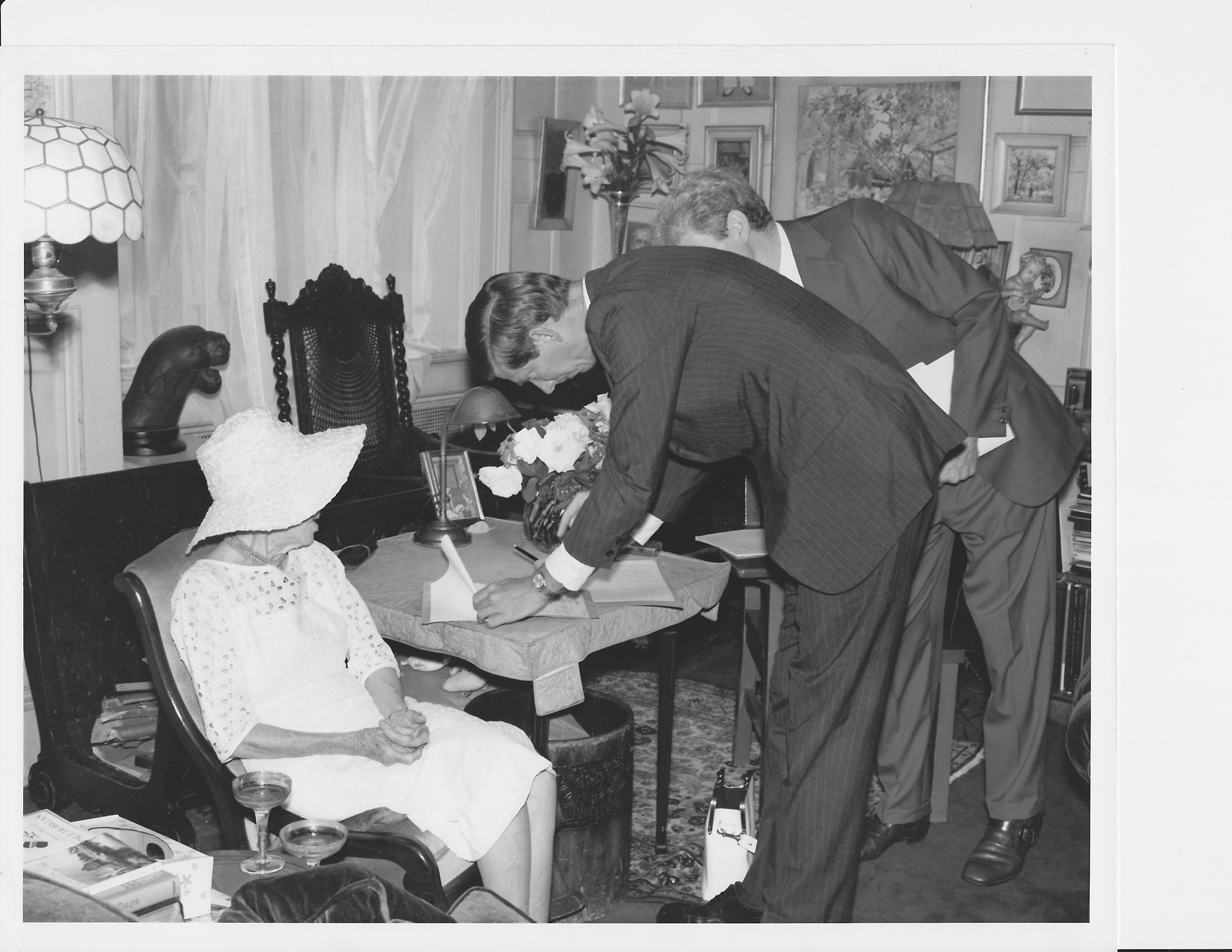
Assistant Secretary of the Interior Nathanial Reed accepts the donation of Salt Meadow (now part of McKinney National Wildlife Refuge) from Esther Lape, 1972

Lape and Read also owned a country house, Salt Meadow, Westbrook, Connecticut, where Roosevelt was often a guest. Lape donated Salt Meadow to the U.S. Fish and Wildlife Service in 1972. The estate is currently the Stewart B. McKinney National Wildlife Refuge. Refuge staff are working on a submission for National Register of Historical Places recognition for the former Salt Meadow estate that will recognize the same-sex relationship of Lape and Read.

Esther Everett Lape died on May 17, 1981, in New York City, at 99 years old.
