= Polly Porter =

Polly Porter is the name of:

- Mary “Polly” Winearls Porter (1886-1980), English crystallographer and geologist
- Mary G. "Polly" Porter (1884-1972), social worker, partner of Molly Dewson and friend of Eleanor Roosevelt
