= Lelia Judson Tuttle =

American educator

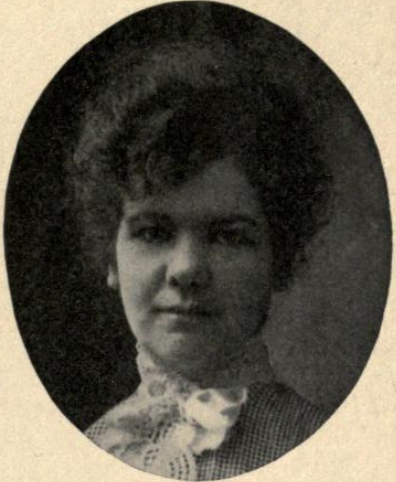
- Lelia Judson Tuttle, from the 1906 yearbook of Teachers College, Columbia University
- Born: May 12, 1878; Caldwell County, North Carolina, U.S.
- Died: November 8, 1967 (age 89); Caldwell County, North Carolina, U.S.
- Occupation(s): Educator, college dean, Christian missionary
- Known for: Taught at McTyeire School and Soochow University in China
- Notable work: Tuttle Educational State Forest (donated first 168 acres in 1956)
- Relatives: Worth Tuttle Hedden (niece)

Lelia Judson Tuttle (May 12, 1878 – November 8, 1967) was an American educator and missionary in China. She was chair of the English literature department at McTyeire Institute in Shanghai from 1910 to 1926, and dean of women at Soochow University from 1926 until 1941.

== Early life and education ==
Tuttle was born in Caldwell County, North Carolina, the youngest of at least eleven children of Benedict Marcus Tuttle and Mary Anne Elizabeth Cochrane Tuttle. Her eldest brother, Herndon Tuttle, was a friend of Charlie Soong, giving her an early connection to Chinese Methodists.

She graduated from the North Carolina State Normal and Industrial College in Greensboro (now UNC-Greensboro) in 1900, and earned a master's degree from Teachers College, Columbia University in 1906. She trained for mission work at Scarritt College for Christian Workers in Kansas City.

== Career ==
Tuttle taught at Davenport College in North Carolina from 1902 to 1904. She went to China as a Methodist missionary in 1909. She was head of the English literature department at McTyeire Institute in Shanghai until 1926, when she became dean of women at Soochow University. She left China in 1941.

Tuttle spoke about her experiences in China to community and church groups on her furlough visits to North Carolina, and in her later years. In 1956, she gave 168 acres of land in Caldwell County to the Tuttle Forest Foundation. The Tuttle Educational State Forest is named for her.

== Personal life ==
Tuttle died in 1967, at the age of 89, in Caldwell County. Twenty boxes of her papers and artifacts from China are held by the special collections library at UNC-Greensboro. Her family has made additions to the collection in recent years. One of her nieces, Worth Tuttle Hedden, was a novelist.
