= Mary Porter =

Mary Porter may refer to:

- Mary Bea Porter (born 1949), American golfer
- Mary Porter (actress) (died 1765), English actress
- Mary Porter (politician) (born 1942), Australian politician
- Mary Winearls Porter (1886–1980), English geologist
- Mary G. Porter (1884–1972), American social worker
- Mary Porter, a character from The Vampire Diaries
