= Worth Tuttle Hedden =

American writer (1896–1985)

- Born: Ella Worth Tuttle; January 10, 1896; Raleigh, North Carolina, U.S.
- Died: September 14, 1985 (aged 89); Augusta, Maine, U.S.
- Education: Martha Washington College; Trinity College of Arts and Sciences; Columbia University Graduate School of Journalism
- Occupation: Writer
- Spouse: Walter Page Hedden (m. 1919)
- Children: 3
- Writing career
- Notable awards: Anisfield-Wolf Book Award (1948)

Worth Tuttle Hedden (born Ella Worth Tuttle; January 10, 1896 – September 14, 1985) was an American writer who released four books between the 1940s and 1950s. Of her works, Wives of High Pasture became available in 1944 while The Other Room came out in 1947. The following year, The Other Room received the Anisfield-Wolf Book Award for fiction. After publishing Love is a Wound in 1952, Two and Three Make One was made public in 1956 under her pen name Winifred Woodley. Apart from books, Tuttle wrote for the Encyclopædia Britannica between 1927 and 1928 while also writing for magazines such as The World Tomorrow. She advocated for civil rights. She won a Southern Authors Award.

Heden graduated from Trinity College in Durham, North Carolina, in 1916. She married Walter Page Hedden in 1919. She wrote short stories and essays about women and African Americans magazines before becoming a novelist. She studied at the Columbia University School of Journalism.

Outside of writing, Tuttle held secretarial and assistant positions between the 1910s and 1920s. Some people that Tuttle worked for in these positions include Walter B. Pitkin and Mary Hunter Austin. During the late 1910s, Tuttle helped veterans while working at a New York branch of the American Red Cross. She wrote to W. E. B. Du Bois in 1928 about story she hoped to publish in The Crisis. As an English teacher, Tuttle taught at Straight College in the early 1920s and The Windward School during the mid-1930s.

== Early life and education ==
Ella Worth Tuttle lived in various parts of North Carolina after her birth occurred in Raleigh, North Carolina, on January 10, 1896. Growing up, Tuttle had multiple siblings and lived with her family members. While in primary school, Tuttle wanted to write for her career. For her post-secondary education, Tuttle went to Virginia and attended junior college. After her studies at Martha Washington College, Tuttle went to Trinity College and the Columbia University School of Journalism. The Trinity Archive released works by Tuttle while she was studying English at Trinity.

== Career ==
=== 1910s to 1930s ===
In between her post-secondary studies, Tuttle began working at the Virginia Bureau of Vocations for Women in 1916 as a secretary. With assistant positions, Tuttle worked for Norman Thomas and Walter B. Pitkin between 1917 and 1918 in New York City. While in New York, Tuttle helped veterans at a branch of the American Red Cross and penned African American short stories. After spending a year at the Red Cross, Hedden left New York for New Orleans in 1920 and became an English teacher at Straight College.

Hedden primarily raised her children throughout the 1920s. During this time period, she worked for Mary Hunter Austin as a secretary and was hired by magazines as a book reviewer. In 1924, Hedden wrote a piece for The Atlantic Monthly. Harper's Magazine, The American Scholar and The World Tomorrow were additional magazines that Hedden's works appeared in. From 1927 to 1928, Hedden wrote for the Encyclopædia Britannica. Some topics that Hedden wrote about were Emily Dickinson and the Oneida Community. In 1935, Hedden began writing Wives of High Pasture. During this time period, Hedden was working in Westchester, New York as a writer and English teacher for The Windward School.

=== 1940s to 1950s ===
After the release of Wives of High Pasture in 1944, The Other Room was published in 1947. Hedden converted a play she had completed in the 1920s to make The Other Room during the mid-1940s. The following year, The Other Room won the Southern Author's Award and the Anisfield-Wolf Book Award for fiction in 1948. In 1949, the book was re-released by Bantam Books and set a ten-day average record with over 16,000 sales.

With the sales record, The Other Room was called "the fastest selling book in America" by Bantam. By July 1949, The Other Room had 310,000 sales. In 1952, Hedden released Love is a Wound. Hedden used the name Winifred Woodley to publish her 1956 book titled Two and Three Make One.

== Writing process and themes ==
To create her books, Hedden revised her drafts on her typewriter multiple times. With her drafts, Hedden includes notes that she handwrote. For Wives of High Pasture, Hedden wrote about romance in a fictionalized group of people and used "the historical accounts of the Oneida Community" to write the book. The Other Room is about an interracial relationship at a post-secondary institute in New Orleans. Hedden used her time at Dillard to create the basis of her book. She set Wives of High Pasture in the 1850s while The Other Room took place in the 1920s.

Love Is a Wound is based in North Carolina and involves a love triangle. She set her book over the course of fifty years between 1884 and 1934. Hedden incorporated the love triangle between her aunt and parents to write Love Is a Wound. The book was originally started as Prism before Hedden renamed it to Love Is a Wound after a work by Edith Rickert. To make Two and Three Makes One, Hedden used notes of what occurred during her life between the mid-1930s and early 1940s.

== Personal life and death ==
During the 1910s, Ella Worth Tuttle renamed herself to Worth Tuttle after she decided to remove her first name. In 1919, Tuttle married and became Worth Tuttle Hedden. During her marriage, Hedden had three children. On September 14, 1985, Hedden died in Augusta, Maine.

== Books ==
- The Other Room
- Wives of High Pasture
- Love Is a Wound
- Two and Three Make One:The Story of a Family
- The Collected Stories of Worth Tuttle Hedden, Volume 1
