= Robert W. Dunn =

American political activist and economics researcher (1895–1977)

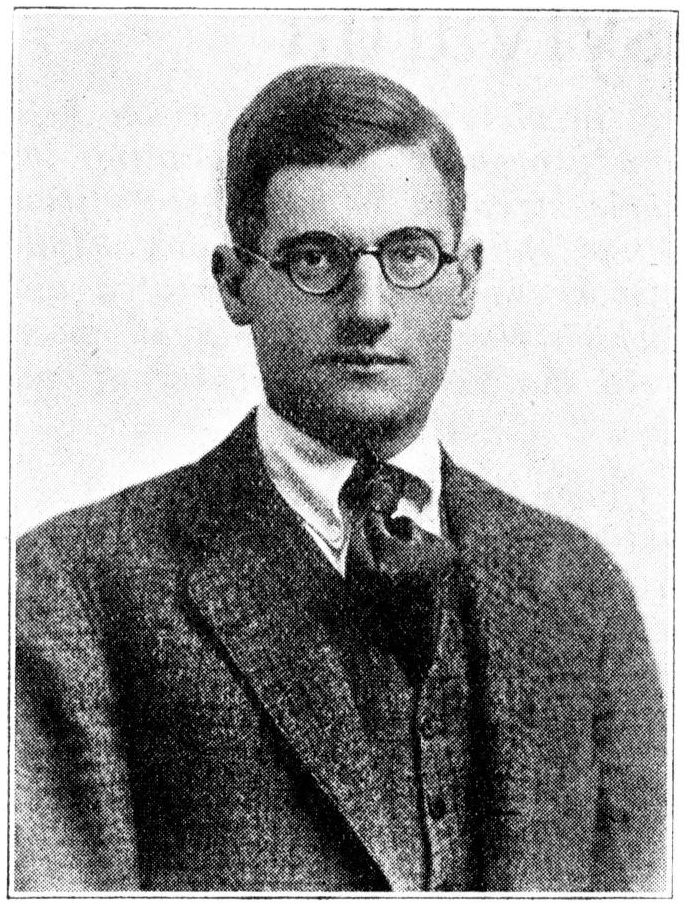
Dunn c. 1926

Robert Williams Dunn (1895–1977) was an American political activist and economic researcher. Dunn was an active member of the American Civil Liberties Union from its creation, serving on that group's National Committee from 1923 and on its board of directors from 1933 to 1941. Dunn was the author of a number of books and pamphlets on economic themes relating to the working class published by the Communist Party USA.

== Background ==
Robert Williams Dunn was born June 1, 1895, in Huntingdon, Pennsylvania, the son of a lawyer. Raised as a Quaker, Bob Dunn attended elementary and secondary school in his hometown of Huntingdon before leaving to attend Yale University.

While at college, Dunn's pacifist philosophical beliefs moved into the political realm. Dunn was elected the President of the Collegiate Anti-Militarism League in 1916, holding that post until 1918. He was also elected President of the Yale chapter of the Intercollegiate Socialist Society in 1917.

== Career ==
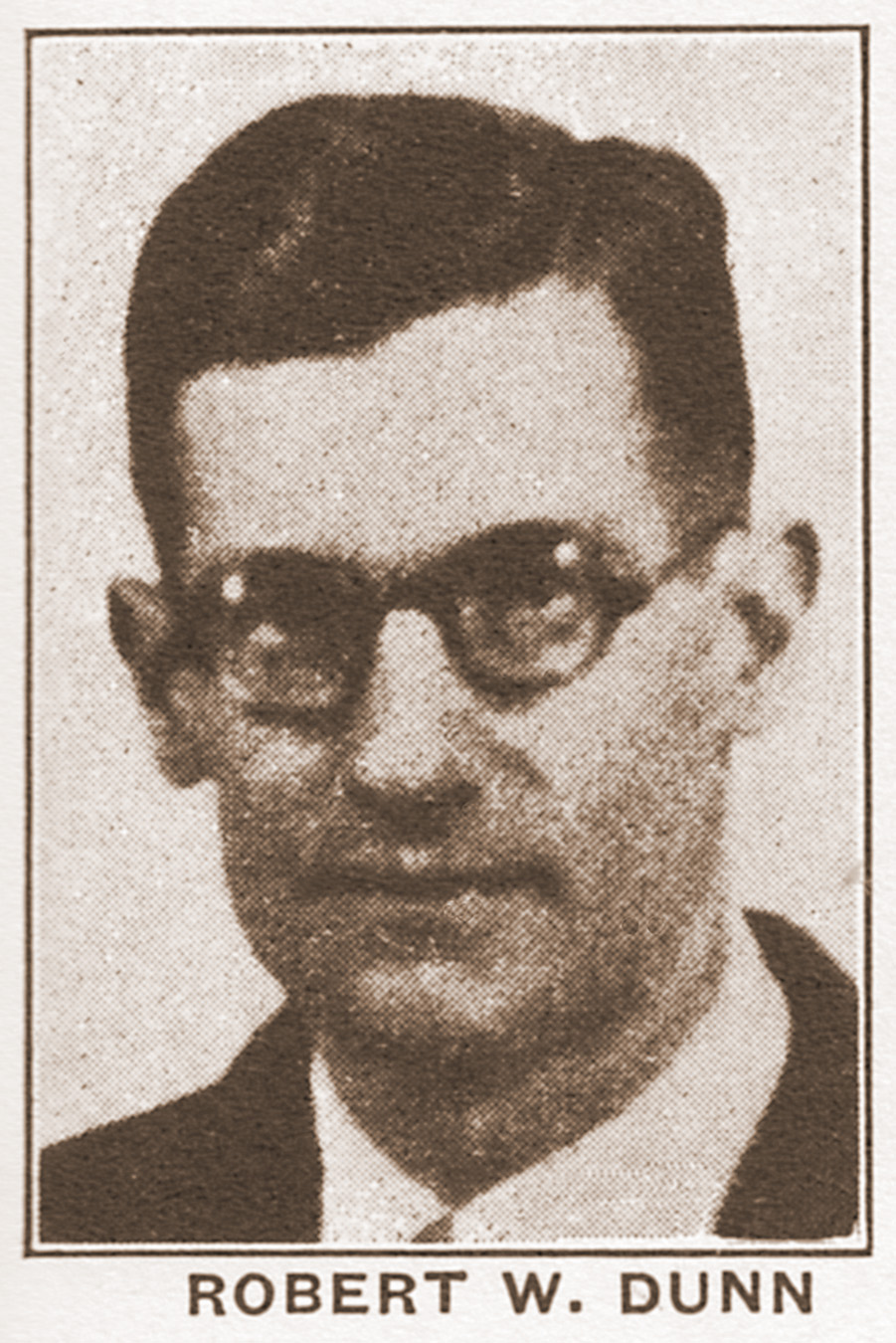
Labor economist Robert W. Dunn as he appeared in 1929

After graduation from Yale with a Bachelor's degree in 1918, Dunn went to work for A.J. Muste as the secretary of Muste's Union for Democratic Control in Boston. He became the general organizer for Muste's nascent Amalgamated Textile Workers Union (ATWU) the following year. After a raid on ATWU headquarters during the First Red Scare, Dunn was briefly held on charges of conspiring to overthrow the government.

Shortly thereafter, Dunn became secretary for the New England Civil Liberties Bureau. Dunn also conducted research projects on behalf of the ATWU, served as a fellow for the New School for Social Research, and served as publicity director for the American Friends Service Committee.

In March 1922, Dunn was dispatched to Soviet Russia by the Quakers' social service organization, where he participated in relief efforts in the Russian famine of 1921, also publicizing the situation through reports via the Federated Press news service.

Dunn returned to the United States in May 1923, being closely questioned upon his arrival by an agent of the Justice Department's Bureau of Investigation, forerunner of the FBI. Although he was only found by the investigating authorities to be carrying statistical information about the Russian textile industry, Dunn returned to America a committed believer in the Soviet social and economic experiment. Dunn wrote a series of articles on the Soviet situation for such publications as the liberal magazine, The New Republic, the monthly journal of the Trade Union Educational League, The Labor Herald, and the organ of the League for Industrial Democracy, the LID Bulletin.

It is not certain in what year Dunn joined the Communist Party, although at the time of his death he was remembered in the official party newspaper as a long-term member of the organization.

In 1923, Dunn became an associate director of the American Civil Liberties Union shortly after his return from Soviet Russia, serving as acting director from May to October 1923. He was also a contributor to the periodic almanac published by the Rand School of Social Science, the American Labor Year Book, throughout the decade of the 1920s. Dunn also served as the publicity director of the Russian-American Industrial Corporation (RAIC), a project of the Amalgamated Textile Workers Union intended to help jump start the Soviet textile industry.

In 1925, he was one of many founding members of International Labor Defense.

In 1927, together with Grace Hutchins and Anna Rochester, Dunn formed a radical economic research institute called the Labor Research Association. He remained Executive Secretary of this body until 1975. Dunn's Labor Research Association was best known for its biannual almanac, the Labor Fact Book, published by the Communist Party-affiliated International Publishers from 1933.

=== Death and legacy ===
Bob Dunn died in January 1977 at the age of 81.

Dunn's papers were donated to Wayne State University in Detroit, Michigan in May 1964 and were opened for research the following year. The Papers of the Labor Research Association are held by the Robert F. Wagner Labor Archives and Tamiment Library of New York University.

== Works ==
=== Books and Pamphlets ===
- Pen Pictures of Russian Village Life During the Famine. With Jessica Smith. Philadelphia : American Friends Service Committee, 1923.
- American Foreign Investments. New York: B.W. Huebsch and the Viking Press, 1926.
- American company unions; a study of employee representation plans, "works councils" and other substitutes for labor unions, Chicago: Trade Union Educational League, 1926 Labor herald library #15
- The Americanization of Labor: The Employers' Offensive Against the Trade Unions. Introduction by Scott Nearing. New York: International Publishers, 1927.
- Company Unions: Employers' Industrial Democracy. Introduction by Louis Budenz. New York: Vanguard Press, 1927.
- Soviet Trade Unions. New York: Vanguard Press, 1928.
- Labor and Automobiles. New York: International Publishers, 1929.
- Labor and Textiles: A Study of Cotton and Wool Manufacturing. With Jack Hardy [pseudonym for Dale Zysman]. New York: International Publishers, 1931.
- Spying on Workers. New York: International Pamphlets, 1932 International pamphlets, #17
- What War Means to the Workers: Answering the Question: Will War Bring Back Prosperity? New York: Workers Library Publishers, 1933.
- Report on Interference with Madison Square Garden Meeting against Austrian Fascism, Held in New York City on February 16, 1934: Together with the Findings of the Board of Directors and Two Minority Dissents, Submitted to the Board of Directors of the American Civil Liberties Union. With Mary Van Kleeck and Norman Thomas. New York: American Civil Liberties Union, 1934.
- Company Unions Today. New York: International Pamphlets, 1935. International pamphlets, #43
- Life and labor in the Soviet Union (with George Wallace) New York: International Pamphlets, 1937. International pamphlets, #52
- Crisis in the Civil Liberties Union: A Statement, Including the Basic Documents Concerned, Giving the Minority Position in the Current Controversy in ACLU. New York: n.p., 1940.
- The Bill of Rights in Danger. New York: International Labor Defense, 1940.
- Herbert Hoover: Full Face. With Charles J. Coe. San Francisco: International Book Store, 1944.
- The Palmer Raids. New York: International Publishers, 1948.

=== Articles ===
- "Foreign Investments and Imperialism." The Annals of the American Academy of Political and Social Science, vol. 138 (July 1928), pp. 13–18.
- "American Imperialism Prepares for War." The Communist,vol. 12, no. 7 (July 1933), pp. 625–635.
- "How the Cards are Stacked in the New Deal." Labor Unity, vol. 8, no. 8 (August 1933), pp. 11–14.
