= The World Tomorrow (magazine) =

American political magazine

The World Tomorrow: A Journal Looking Toward a Christian World (1918–1934) was an American political magazine, founded by the American office of the pacifist organization Fellowship of Reconciliation (FORUSA). It was published under the organization's The Fellowship Press, Inc., located at 108 Lexington Avenue in New York City. Prior to June 1918, the periodical was titled The New World. It was a leading voice of Christian socialism in the United States, with an "independent, militant" editorial line.

== Editorial and staff history ==
Through the years, The World Tomorrow's editorial masthead was a melange of rotating names and titles, with differences between full-, part-time, paid, and unpaid editors and staff never made particularly clear. However, titles aside, the editorial constant at the magazine from 1922 to its closing was pacifist Devere Allen, generally listed as "managing editor." Over the years, writers and editors for the magazine included a number of prominent figures in politics, religion, journalism, and the arts.

From 1918 to 1921, Norman Thomas, six-time presidential candidate for the Socialist Party of America, served as the magazine's first editor. In 1921, Thomas moved to secular journalism as associate editor of The Nation magazine.

Walter Fuller, originally styled "editorial secretary" in the early The New World in 1918, was later given the title "associate editor." He did the actual work of editing for Norman Thomas, and was paid a regular salary. In February 1920, he moved on to become managing editor of The Freeman, although his name remained for a while on the list of members of the board of The World Tomorrow. When Fuller collapsed and died of a brain hemorrhage in September 1927, Norman Thomas sent a glowing eulogy to the BBC, for whom Fuller was editing Radio Times.

Devere Allen, who edited the magazine for more than ten years, from 1922 to 1934, was a Socialist pacifist activist. He championed nonviolent resistance while member of the Socialist Party of America in the 1930s and founded the World-Over Press after leaving The World Tomorrow.

In 1926, African-American novelist, Wallace Thurman, became an editor at The World Tomorrow after serving as managing editor at The Messenger, a political literary magazine, where he published fellow Harlem Renaissance writers like Langston Hughes and Zora Neale Hurston.

John Nevin Sayre was listed as editor of The World Tomorrow from 1922 to 1924, and then as associate secretary from 1924 to 1935. Sayre was an Episcopal minister, peace activist, and author who helped found the Episcopal Peace Fellowship. Sayre's brother, Assistant Undersecretary of State Francis B. Sayre, had Alger Hiss reporting directly to him at the State Department but declined to testify on his behalf. His brother married the daughter of Woodrow Wilson.

Militant English peace activist and suffragist Evelyn Sharp wrote for the magazine in the early 1920s and was listed as its correspondent in England.

Anna Rochester was a FOR member who served as editor-in-chief from 1922 to 1926, then resigned in 1927 over political differences. Within a month, she received an invitation to join the magazine's board, which she declined.

Kirby Page, listed as editor from 1926 to 1934, was an American Disciples of Christ minister, an author, and a peace activist.

Prominent American theologian and commentator on public affairs Reinhold Niebuhr contributed to the magazine in the 1920s and then became a part-time editor. Niebuhr became an anti-communist in 1940, after starting as a leftist minister in the 1920s (indebted to theological liberalism) and a new neo-orthodox theologian in the 1930s.

Grace Hutchins, the life partner of Anna Rochester, was also a FOR member who worked for the magazine. Hutchins served as press secretary (1924–1926), business editor (1925–1926), and contributing editor.

Esther Shemitz, later the wife of Whittaker Chambers, and Shemitz's close friend Grace Lumpkin worked for the magazine in the 1920s. Hutchins and Rochester were their art patrons, supporting Shemitz's painting and Lumpkin's writing, e.g., publication of To Make My Bread (1933).

A. A. MacLeod, later a Communist member of the Ontario legislature, served as managing editor until 1933.

In the 1930s, Paul Douglas, an economist at the University of Chicago and later a United States senator from Illinois, served for a time as editor.

Henry Noel Brailsford contributed a weekly feature in the 1930s.

=== Resurgence and demise ===
In August 1932, when many weekly magazines were reducing their publication frequency to monthly, Time reported that The World Tomorrow would go from a monthly to a weekly format. "The times in which we are now living demand a sustained emphasis upon religion, pacifism, and socialism, and... no other American journal is concentrating upon this combination." It noted that its editors included Page, Niebuhr, Allen, and Douglas.

However, the magazine did not long survive the departure of Devere Allen in 1934. The World Tomorrow was subsumed by the Fellowship of Reconciliation's quarterly journal Fellowship, a publication which continues to this day. The Fellowship of Reconciliation's website simply states:

By 1934, its circulation had risen to 40,000. The World Tomorrow was succeeded in 1935 by Fellowship, edited by Harold Fey; later editors included John Nevin Sayre, Alfred Hassler, William Miller, James Forest, and Virginia Baron.

== Publishing history ==
According to holdings at the Library of Congress, the magazine was published as follows:

- Monthly: January 1918 – July 1932 (suspended May–September 1926)
- Weekly: September 1932 – April 1933
- Monthly: May–August 1933
- Biweekly: August 31, 1933 – July 26, 1934

For the first five issues of the first volume (January–May 1918) its title was The New World.

The complete run of The World Tomorrow from 1918 to 1934 is available as item 23 in the Library of World Peace Studies edited by Warren F. Kuehl. [New York]: Clearwater, 1978–1982. 1242 microfiches. The Library of Congress' holding starts with vol. 1, no. 6 dated June 1918 and ends with vol. 17, no. 15 dated July 26, 1934.
