= Labor Research Association =

Statistics bureau established by members of the Workers Party of America

The Labor Research Association (LRA) was a left-wing labor statistics bureau based in New York City. It was established in November 1927 by members of the Workers (Communist) Party of America. The organization published a biannual series of volumes known as the Labor Fact Book; it compiled and produced statistics and information for use by trade unions and political activists. The LRA has been frequently characterized as a front organization of the Communist Party. Jonathan Tasini was the executive director of the Labor Research Association in its final years of operation, including 2008. The organization ceased operations around 2009.

== Organizational history ==
The Labor Research Association (LRA) was established late in 1927 by International Publishers president Alexander Trachtenberg and several individuals formerly associated with the Socialist Party's Rand School of Social Science, including Scott Nearing, Solon DeLeon, and Robert W. Dunn. In addition, founders included the prominent radical intellectuals Anna Rochester and Grace Hutchins.

According to American communist writer Myra Page, her husband John Markey (writing as "John Barnett") began working there in 1930, at which time LRA's directors included Anna Rochester, Bob Dunn, Grace Hutchins, Carl Haessler, and Charlotte Todes Stern (another John Reed Club member, along with her husband Bernhard Stern). Edward Dahlberg contributed writings. Dunn, Hutchins, and Rochester published Labor Fact Book.

Originally conceived and organized by Trachtenberg, LRA was announced at the November 2, 1927 meeting of the Political Committee of the Workers (Communist) Party. The organization's declared task was "to conduct research into economic, social, and political problems in the interest of the American labor movement and to publish its findings in articles, pamphlets and books." To this end, from 1931 to 1963, the LRA published a biannual series of statistical and political yearbooks called The Labor Fact Book. These were produced by International Publishers. Also produced by International Publishers under the direction of the Labor Research Association were a numbered series of "International Pamphlets" from 1930–1937 covering topics such as farming, chemical weapons, child labor, racism, lynching, women's labor, colonialism, criminalization, imperialism and violence against picketers.

The LRA sought to establish a connection between the labor movement and the Communist movement.

== Labor Fact Book volumes ==
The LRA's Labor Fact Book series was published regularly and is archived online:

- Labor Fact Book 1 (1931)
- Labor Fact Book 2 (1934)
- Labor Fact Book 3 (1936)
- Labor Fact Book 4 (1938)
- Labor Fact Book 5 (1941)
- Labor Fact Book 6 (1943)
- Labor Fact Book 7 (1945)
- Labor Fact Book 8 (1947)
- Labor Fact Book 9 (1949)
- Labor Fact Book 10 (1951)
- Labor Fact Book 11 (1953)
- Labor Fact Book 12 (1955)
- Labor Fact Book 13 (1957)
- Labor Fact Book 14 (1959)
- Labor Fact Book 15 (1961)
- Labor Fact Book 16 (1963)
- Labor Fact Book 17 (1965)

== See also ==
- Bureau of Industrial Research
