= Tuttle Educational State Forest =

Protected area in North Carolina, United States

- IUCN category VI (protected area with sustainable use of natural resources)
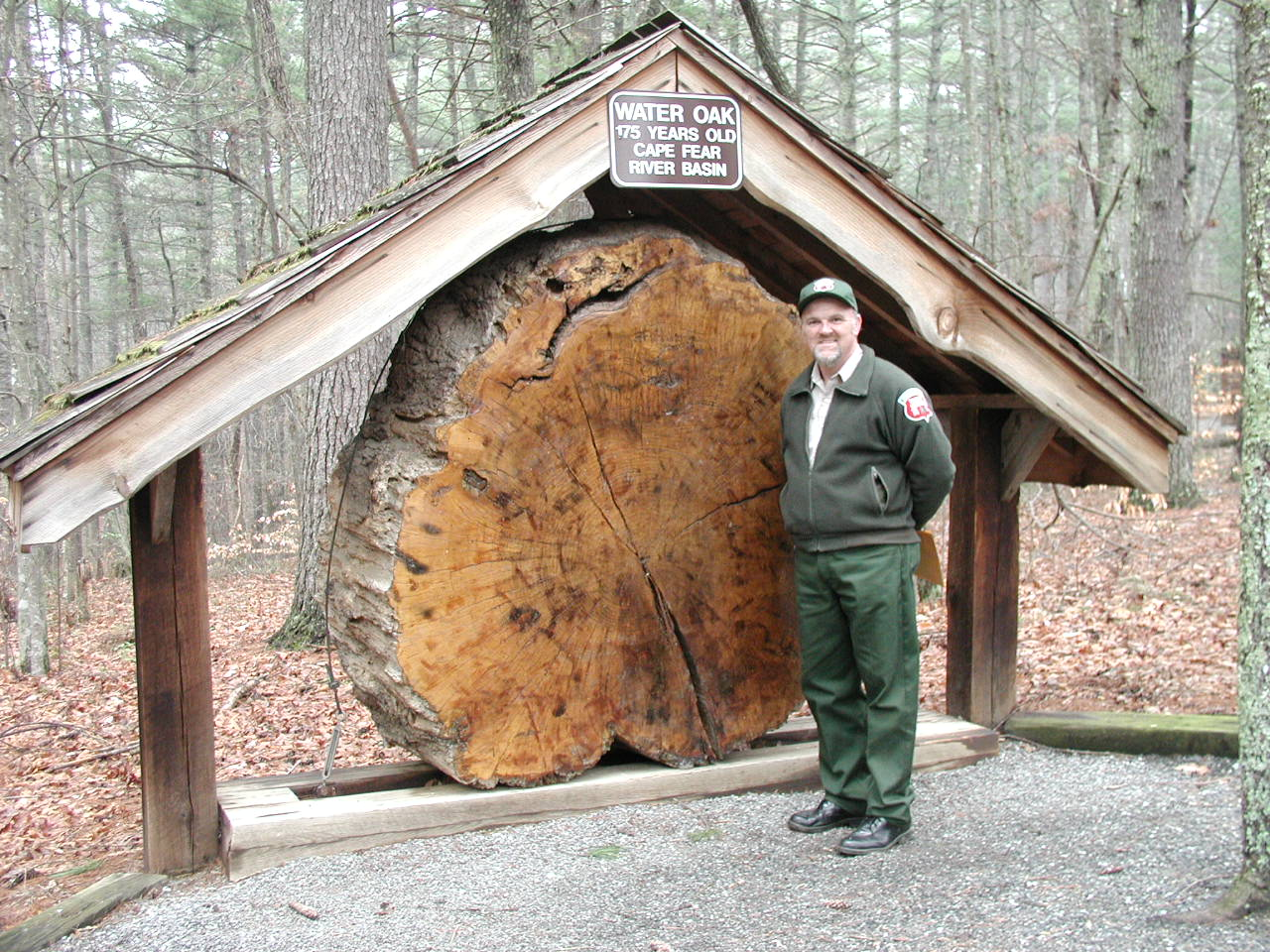
- Forest ranger in front of a 175-year-old Water Oak cross section on exhibit.

- Location within North Carolina
- Location: Caldwell, North Carolina, United States
- Coordinates: 35°51′12″N 081°38′15″W
- Area: 288 acres (117 ha)
- Governing body: North Carolina Forest Service
- Website: Tuttle Educational State Forest

Tuttle Educational State Forest (TESF) is a 288-acre (117 ha) North Carolina State Forest near Lenoir, North Carolina. It was named for American missionary educator Lelia Judson Tuttle, who donated the first 168 acres (68 ha) of land for the park in 1956.

== Nearby state parks ==
The following state parks and state forests are within 30 miles (48 km) of Tuttle Educational State Forest:

Grandfather Mountain State Park
Lake James State Park
Rendezvous Mountain State Park
South Mountains State Park
