= Clara Mortenson Beyer =

American reformer and labor law administrator (1892–1990)

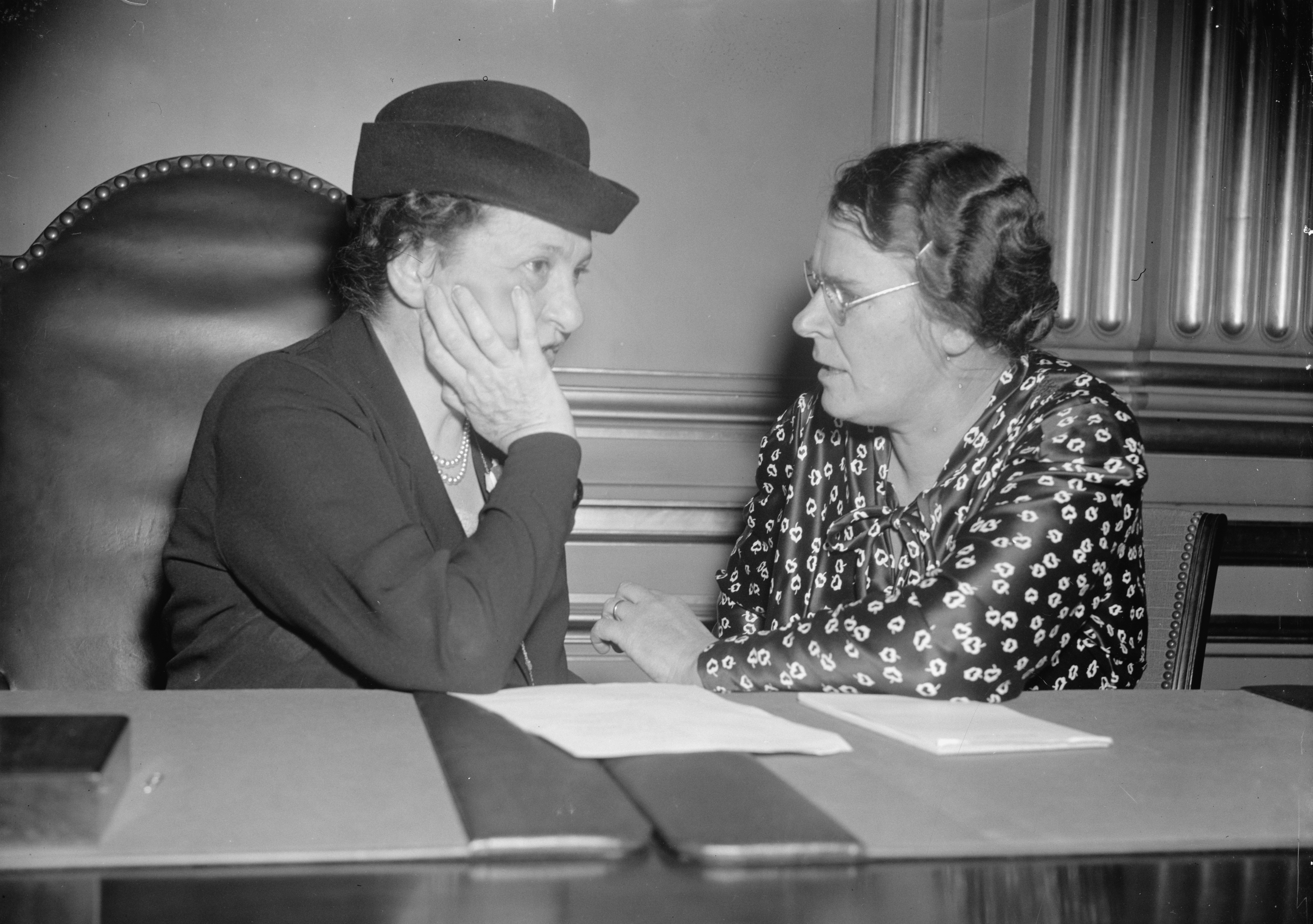
- Beyer (right) with Frances Perkins
- Born: April 13, 1892; Lake County, California, U.S.
- Died: September 25, 1990 (aged 98); Washington, D.C., U.S.
- Resting place: Arlington National Cemetery
- Relatives: Don Beyer (grandson)

Academic background
- Education: University of California, Berkeley

Academic work
- Discipline: Labor economics
- Institutions: United States Department of Labor
- Notable ideas: Fair Labor Standards Act of 1938; Social Security Act of 1935
- Awards: USAID Certificate of Appreciation (1972)

Clara Mortenson Beyer (April 13, 1892 – September 25, 1990) was an American labor economist and workers rights advocate. She worked under Frances Perkins at the United States Department of Labor during the New Deal era, and was instrumental in implementing minimum wage legislation via the Fair Labor Standards Act of 1938.

== Early life and education ==
Clara Mortenson Beyer was born on April 13, 1892, in Lake County, California. She was the sixth child of nine. Her parents were Danish immigrants, Mary Frederickson and Morten Mortenson. Morten Mortenson was a carpenter and unsuccessful chicken farmer, and was killed in a freak trolley accident when Beyer was young. The following hard times for the Mortenson family, during which both Beyer and her mother worked as fruit pickers and domestic laborers, resulted in Beyer's interest in labor politics.

Beyer supported herself through her undergraduate and master's degrees from the University of California, Berkeley. She received her undergraduate degree in 1915, and her master's degree on the subject of economics, specializing in labor issues, in 1916. She served as an instructor at UC Berkeley for one year before agreeing to teach labor economics at Bryn Mawr College in Pennsylvania in 1917.

== Career ==
=== Early advocacy ===
While teaching at Bryn Mawr College, Beyer encouraged students to join picket lines and to investigate tenement sweatshops in Philadelphia. Not long after the beginning of her time at Bryn Mawr, Beyer met Felix Frankfurter, a then Harvard University faculty member and future Supreme Court Justice, who had come to Bryn Mawr in order to deliver a lecture. He was impressed with Beyer and asked her to come and work with him in Washington, D.C., on the War Labor Policies Board, and she accepted his invitation. Beyer served on the War Labor Policy Board throughout World War I, creating labor policies related to the war. She worked with Elizabeth Brandeis on these policies, daughter of Supreme Court Justice Louis Brandeis, and Justice Brandeis went on to become one of Beyer's mentors.

Beyer served as secretary of the District of Columbia Minimum Wage Board. In that position, Beyer established procedures, set minimums, and went so far as to physically go to mercantile houses at the end of the daily shift and inform clerks about the District of Columbia's minimum wage. At the same time, Beyer was a member of the National Consumers' League, where she found a mentor in the secretary of organization, Florence Kelley.

In 1920, she married economist Otto Sternoff Beyer, with whom she had three sons, Morten, Donald and Richard. They moved to New York in 1921. She took on only part-time work while the boys were still at home, and one such part-time position was with the New York Consumers' League. It was there that she met and befriended Molly Dewson and Frances Perkins, both of whom she would go on to work with at the U.S. Department of Labor's Division of Labor Standards. Beyer also worked other part-time jobs at the same time, and served as the executive secretary of the Women's Joint Committee for the Minimum Wage and Hour Legislation, as well as a researcher for the American Federation of Labor. However, Beyer waited until 1928, when all three of her sons were enrolled in school, before she took on full-time work.

=== Department of Labor ===
The Beyer family moved back to Washington, D.C., in 1928 and Clara returned to full-time work as director of the Department of Labor's Children's Bureau. From 1931 to 1934, she was the director of the Industrial Department of that Bureau. During this time, Dewson and Beyer worked together to engineer Frances Perkins' appointment to the position of secretary of labor in 1933.

In 1934, Perkins and Dewson encouraged Beyer to take the freshly-minted position of associate director in the Division of Labor Standards. She served from 1934 to 1957, working on issues of apprenticeship, vocational education, programs for elderly and migrant workers, and other foundational American labor issues. Beyer was excited about working with a newly founded Bureau because she was eager to build an organization from the beginning. Frances Perkins expressed her political inability to appoint another woman to a leading role in an important Labor Department organization, which she told Beyer was why she was not promoted further within the organization, and which Beyer happily accepted. Beyer did go on to become acting director of the Division of Labor Standards for one year, 1957–1958.

During her time at the Bureau of Labor Standards, Beyer was a member of the so-called "Ladies' Brain Trust," working alongside Molly Dewson, Mary La Dame, and Congresswoman Mary T. Norton to advise Frances Perkins in her position as Secretary of Labor during the 1930s and 1940s. Through this advisory position, Beyer became an influential voice in New Deal era labor policies. While serving at the Bureau of Labor Standards, she worked closely with Perkins and Arthur Altmeyer to develop the provisions that went into the Social Security Act of 1935.

Beyer's most recognized achievement at the Bureau of Labor Standards is her instrumental work towards the establishment of the Fair Labor Standards Act of 1938, which set minimum wage and maximum hour standards nationwide. Beyer's bureau helped Ben Cohen and Thomas Corcoran draft the legislation, and when Beyer herself was resisted by organized laborers who worried that minimum wage would lower wages overall, she worked with Congresswoman Mary T. Norton to lobby William Green, president of the American Federation of Labor. With his support, the law passed, and when the act was challenged and appealed to the Supreme Court, Beyer helped prepare the government's successful defense.

=== USAID and retirement ===
Beyer left the Department of Labor in 1958 and went to work at the International Cooperation Administration, which eventually was combined with several other organizations to become the U.S. Agency for International Development (USAID). She would work with USAID until her retirement in 1972, visiting 32 countries and studying labor conditions there. In 1972, when Beyer retired, she was awarded a certificate of appreciation for her contributions to the social and economic development of people both in the United States and overseas. After her retirement, Beyer still served as a consultant for USAID and co-authored the Percy Amendment to the International Cooperation Assistance Act of 1973, which designated certain amounts of U.S. foreign aid to programs for women.

== Death and legacy ==
Beyer died in her Washington, D.C., home on September 25, 1990, due to acute cardiac arrhythmia. She was survived by her three sons, twelve grandchildren, and 23 great-grandchildren. One of her grandchildren, Don Beyer, serves as a Congressman from Virginia's 8th congressional district since 2015, and was the Lieutenant Governor of Virginia from 1990 to 1998, and the United States Ambassador to Switzerland from 2009 to 2013 Don Beyer inaugurated the Clara Mortenson Beyer "Women and Children First" Award in 2011, which honors women leaders making positive change for women.

She was buried in Arlington National Cemetery beside her husband, Otto, who died in 1948. Her papers are held by the Schlesinger Library on the History of Women in America at Harvard University.
