= Georgia Willis Read =

American historian

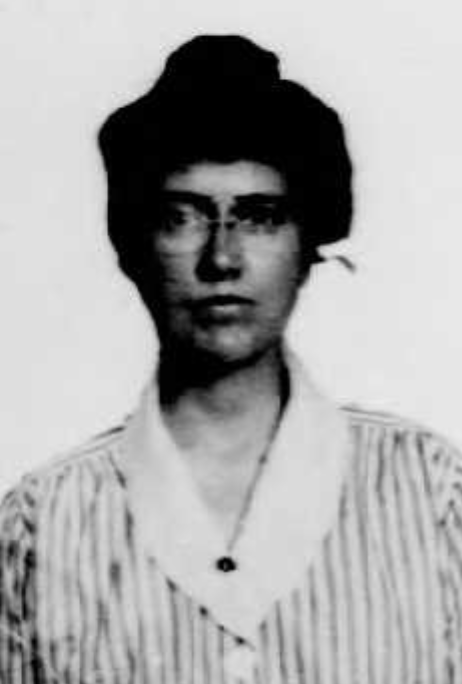
- Georgia Willis Read, from her 1918 passport application
- Born: February 3, 1881; New Brighton, Pennsylvania, U.S.
- Died: November 3, 1965 (age 84); Lebanon, New Hampshire, U.S.
- Occupation(s): Editor, historian, writer, weaver
- Relatives: Elizabeth Fisher Read (sister)

Georgia Willis Read (February 3, 1881 – November 3, 1965) was an American editor, historian, writer, and weaver. She worked as an editor at Columbia University Press, and wrote and edited works on the American West.

== Early life and education ==
Read was born in New Brighton, Pennsylvania, the daughter of George Willis Read (who died in 1880, before she was born) and Henrietta A. Miner Read. Her father was a physician. She attended Smith College, following her older sister Elizabeth Fisher Read.

== Career ==
Read served in the Smith College Relief Unit in France during World War I. She worked at Columbia University Press, and wrote and edited books with her partner and fellow Smith alumna, Ruth Louise Gaines. In addition to their shared projects, she published Gaines's book, City Royal: A Memory of Kyoto (1953), after Gaines's death in 1952. Read and Gaines became weavers in their later years. They grew flax for linen and bred Angora rabbits for wool, to use in their spinning, dyeing, and weaving according to traditional methods.

== Personal life ==
Read and Ruth Gaines lived together on a 100-acre farm in Meriden, New Hampshire. They bought a house together in Frederick, Maryland, in 1948. Gaines died in 1952, and Read returned to Meriden the next year. She died in 1965, at the age of 84. They share a gravestone in New Hampshire. There is a large collection of their papers in the Huntington Library.

== Publications ==
- Médoc in the Moor (1914, novel)
- "Apiculture in the Time of Virgil" (1914)
- The Village Shield: A Story of Mexico (1917, with Ruth Gaines; a novel for young readers)
- A pioneer of 1850: George Willis Read, 1819-1880: the record of a journey overland from Independence, Missouri to Hangtown, California (1927)
- "The Chagres River Route to California in 1851" (1929)
- "Diseases, Drugs, and Doctors on the California-Oregon Trail in the Gold Rush Years" (1944)
- "Women and Children on the California-Oregon Trail in the Gold Rush Years" (1944)
- Gold Rush: The journals, drawings, and other papers of J. Goldsborough Bruff (1944, co-edited with Ruth Gaines)
- "Bruff's Route in Eastern California" (1960)
