= Mary G. Porter =

American social worker

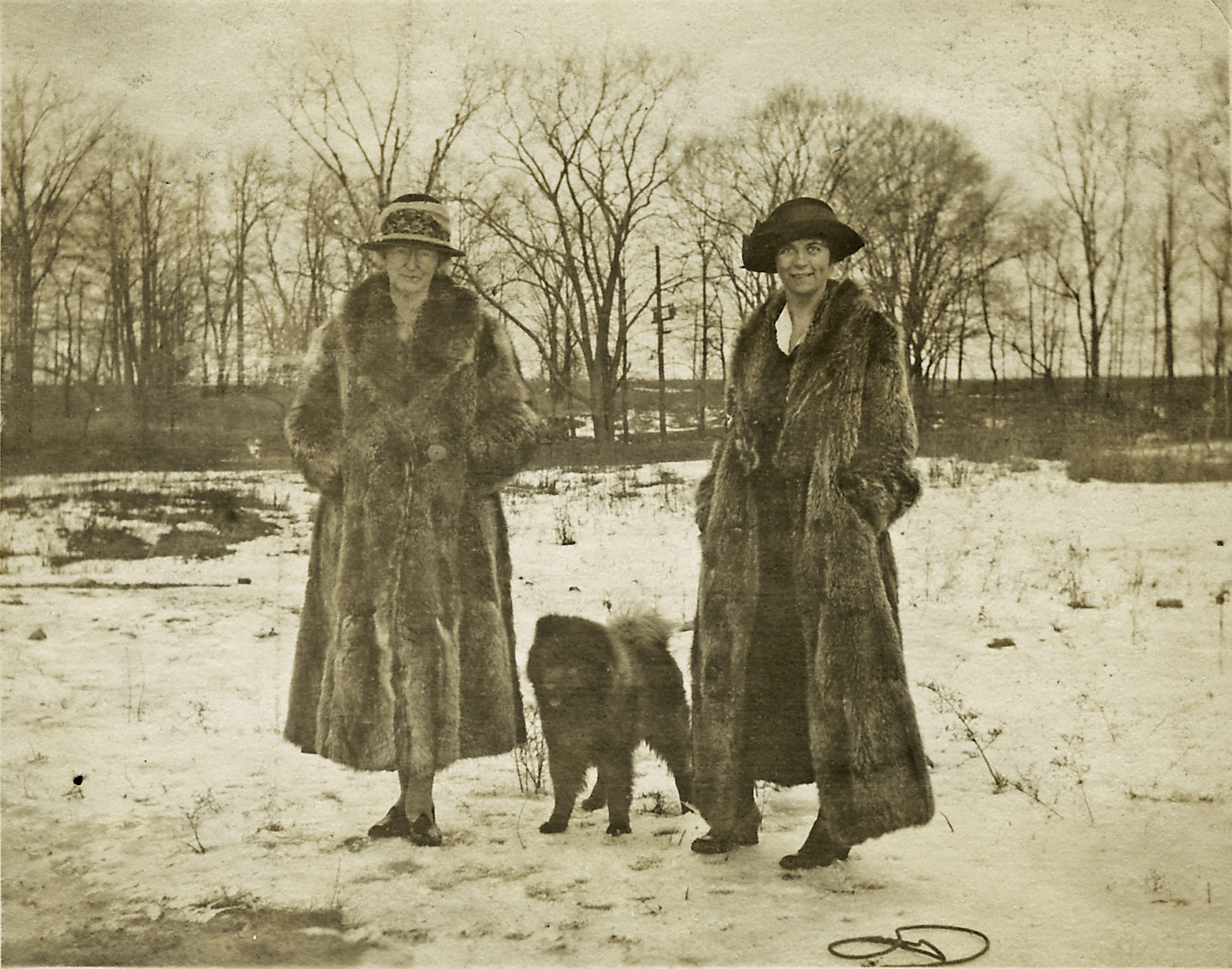
Molly Dewson and Polly Porter, Van Cortlandt Park, Bronx 1925

Mary G. "Polly" Porter (March 1884 – 1972) was an American social worker and for more than 50 years the partner of Mary Dewson, feminist and political activist. Porter was a close friend of Eleanor Roosevelt and part of her tight-knit circle of female friends.

== Biography ==
Mary G. Porter, born in March, 1884, was the daughter of William D. Porter and Mabel G. Porter. Porter was independently wealthy and bred and raised Sheltie dogs at a kennel she owned in Georgetown, Connecticut.

In 1910, Porter attended the Boston School for Social Workers to study to become a social worker. She began an internship at the Massachusetts State Industrial School for Girls under Mary Williams "Molly" Dewson, superintendent of parole, who became her lifelong partner. When the internship ended, Porter remained at the school as a volunteer. According to Dewson's biographer, Susan Ware, Porter was openly approved of by Dewson's mother.

In 1912, Dewson and Porter bought a house in Berlin, Massachusetts, and in 1913 moved to a dairy farm in Worcester, Massachusetts. During World War I, both she and Dewson spent 15 months with the American Red Cross in France to aid war refugees.

In 1922, they moved to 171 West 12th Street; in the same building lived Marion Dickerman and Nancy Cook, Grace Hutchins and Anna Rochester. Nearby, at 20 East 11th Street, lived Esther Lape and Elizabeth Fisher Read. They were part of Roosevelt's support network of female friends.

For several years, Porter and Dewson split their time between New York City and a cottage at Castine, Maine, Moss Acre, the Porter family homeplace, built by Porter’s father in the 1895 as a seasonal home and refuge. In 1952, they retired to Castine full-time. Porter died in 1972, in Castine, and is buried in the local cemetery together with Dewson who had died 10 years earlier.

== Legacy ==
During summer 2017, the Castine Historical Society held the exhibition "Castine’s Devoted Women: Partnership and Social Reform 1910-1962" focused on Mary W. "Molly" Dewson and Mary G. "Polly" Porter.
