= The Windward School =

School for students with learning disabilities in New York

- The Windward School
- White Plains & Manhattan, New York; United States

Information
- Type: Independent Day
- Established: 1926; 100 years ago
- Founder: Isabel Greenbaum Stone
- Interim Head of School: Alexis Pochna
- Grades: 1-9
- Enrollment: 940
- Website: TheWindwardSchool.org

The Windward School is a coeducational, independent day school focused on teaching students in grades 1–9 with dyslexia and other language-based learning disabilities with campuses in Westchester and Manhattan. Windward is recognized across the country and around the world as a leader in providing instruction to children with dyslexia.

The Windward program provides a specialized, language-intensive curriculum, small class settings, and highly trained teachers who help students develop and strengthen their academic skills, confidence, and independence.

The school also implements social-emotional learning into its program, an approach that focuses on building social skills and offering guidance to students through formal lessons, executive functioning supports, and evidenced-based programs such as the RULER method.

Trained teachers assist students to improve their language skills in preparation for a successful return to a mainstream academic environment. Financial aid is available to support families in paying the annual tuition; and in 2026, $9 million in tuition assistance was distributed to Windward students.

== Who Does Windward Serve? ==
The Windward School’s program is designed for students with a written diagnosis or evidence of dyslexia or a language-based learning disability, average to superior intellectual potential, and no behavioral or emotional problems that would interfere with the instructional program. Geographically, Windward students come from more than 90 school districts from the tri-state metropolitan area, including New York City, Long Island, Westchester and Rockland counties, New Jersey, and Connecticut.

== History ==
The Windward School was founded in 1926 by Isabel Greenbaum Stone. Mrs. Stone, together with a group of parents, formally incorporated the school, starting with 21 students. The school was originally located on Quaker Ridge Road in White Plains and moved to 13 Windward Avenue in 1930, a building designed by Windward parents who were architects. The school stayed at 13 Windward exclusively until 2002 when the middle school division relocated to 40 West Red Oak Lane. The number of students continued to grow and the school subsequently certified with the New York State Board of Regents as a school for learning disabled children in 1976. Beginning in 1983, Windward opened its doors to high school students, until 2004 when the school graduated its final class of seniors. In 1988, the school shifted its focus to students with language-based learning disabilities and is now regarded as one of the top schools in the U.S. for students with such disabilities.

In 1994, the Windward Teacher Training Institute (WTTI) was founded to provide professional development for educators and professionals in allied disciplines to teach children of all abilities, –in special education and mainstream classrooms– by sharing Windward’s expertise to the broader educational community. The WWTI was accredited International Multisensory Structured Language Education Council (IMSLEC) in 2007.

In 2015, Windward opened the Manhattan Lower and Middle Schools, who moved to their permanent location only a year after. The Manhattan division continued to expand in the following years, receiving eighth grade students as well as introducing the Windward Summer program to the Manhattan Campus. Windward Lower School in Westchester, New York opened in 2020.

In January 2020, WTTI was renamed The Windward Institute. The Windward Institute continues to advocate for literacy, establishing partnerships between top research and educational institutions, as well as to promote awareness and resources for students with language-based learning disabilities such as universal screenings.

To reach more families and children in the broader community and offer resources, The Windward Institute began offering free reading screenings in 2021 to students in grades k-3. Conducted by trained teachers from The Windward School, families will learn about their child’s reading skill development, areas of need, and considerations for school and home during a private discussion with a specialist from Windward. The Windward Institute Free Community Reading Screenings are made possible by the Early Literacy Endowment.

As Windward continues to expand their program for those who need it, the new Westchester Lower School campus opened in 2022; welcoming students grades 1–5.

== Alumni ==
98% of Windward students return to a mainstream academic environment after it is determined they have completed the Windward academic program and are ready to return to the mainstream academic setting.

Alumni have gone on to lead successful academic careers after their time at Windward, attending institutions such as Harvard University, University of Michigan, Boston College, Georgetown University, and more than 400 more.

Additionally, alumni have demonstrated notable professional accomplishments, the school having produced CEOs, scientists, Olympic athletes, and other extraordinary community members working with organizations such as St. Jude’s Children’s Research Hospital. Alumni have made contributions to a variety of causes, especially in advocating for literacy and education.
