= Mary Dewson =

Mary W. Dewson
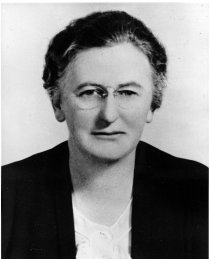
- Mary W. Dewson
- Born: February 18, 1874; Quincy, Massachusetts, U.S.
- Died: October 21, 1962 (aged 88); Castine, Maine, U.S.
- Education: Wellesley College (BSW)
- Occupation: Social Security Board Member

Mary Williams Dewson (1874–1962) was an American feminist and political activist. After graduating from Wellesley College in 1897, she worked for the Women's Educational and Industrial Union. She became an active member of the National Consumers League (NCL) and received mentorship from Florence Kelley, a famous advocate for social justice feminism and General Secretary of the NCL. Dewson's later role as civic secretary of the Women's City Club of New York (WCCNY) led to her meeting Eleanor Roosevelt, who later convinced Dewson to be more politically active in the Democratic Party. Dewson went on to take over Roosevelt's role as head of the Women's Division of the Democratic National Campaign Committee. Dewson's "Reporter Plan" mobilized thousands of women to spread information about the New Deal legislation and garner support for it. In connection with the Reporter Plan, the Women's Division held regional conferences for women. This movement led to a historically high level of female political participation.

== Early life and education ==
Dewson was born in Quincy, Massachusetts, on February 18, 1874. She was the youngest of six children. Her mother, Elizabeth Weld Williams, and father, Edward Henry Dewson, lived in Roxbury when they had their first child, Francis Williams. After moving to Quincy, they had five more children: George Badger, William Inglee, Edward Henry Jr., Ellen Reed, and Mary Williams.

Dewson's mother took on a domestic role and took care of the household during Dewson's childhood, while her father worked in the leather business. Dewson was very athletic and played both baseball and tennis. She was not concerned with her appearance, and preferred to play with "boy's" toys like paper soldiers instead of the traditional dolls made for young girls.

She attended private schools, including Dana Hall School, before entering Wellesley College, from which she graduated as a social worker in 1897. At Wellesley, she was senior class president and her classmates believed she might one day be elected president of the United States.

== Career ==
=== Early career, 1897–1912 ===
Shortly after graduating from Wellesley in 1897, Dewson began working as research assistant at the Women's Educational and Industrial Union, an organization that originated in Boston to advocate for the social advancement of women, women's education, and rights of women in the workforce. Dewson was offered this job by Elizabeth Glendower Evans, a reformer from Boston and one of Dewson's mentors. During her time at the WEIU, Dewson conducted statistical studies and reported on women's poor working conditions. She also taught a course on household economics. The lack of reading material for the course inspired her to write and publish The Twentieth Century Expense Book (1899). It served as a basic guide to help American women budget a household and prioritize expenses.

In 1900, Dewson joined the Massachusetts State Industrial School for Girls, located in Lancaster, Massachusetts. By 1904, she became the first superintendent of their parole department. The school's goal was to rehabilitate young women delinquents, especially those who grew up in poverty. Dewson put her efforts towards understanding the different factors that affect female crime and delinquency. She gathered statistical data and used this information to improve the rehabilitation process. She wrote a paper titled "The Delinquent Girl on Parole" about her findings. She presented it in 1911 at the National Conference of Charities and Correction.

Even before leaving the Industrial School (1912), she became involved in the minimum wage movement (1911). She was named executive secretary of the Minimum Wage Investigative Committee, which produced a report that led to Massachusetts' (and the nation's) first minimum wage law. This report brought her national recognition.

=== Suffrage movement ===
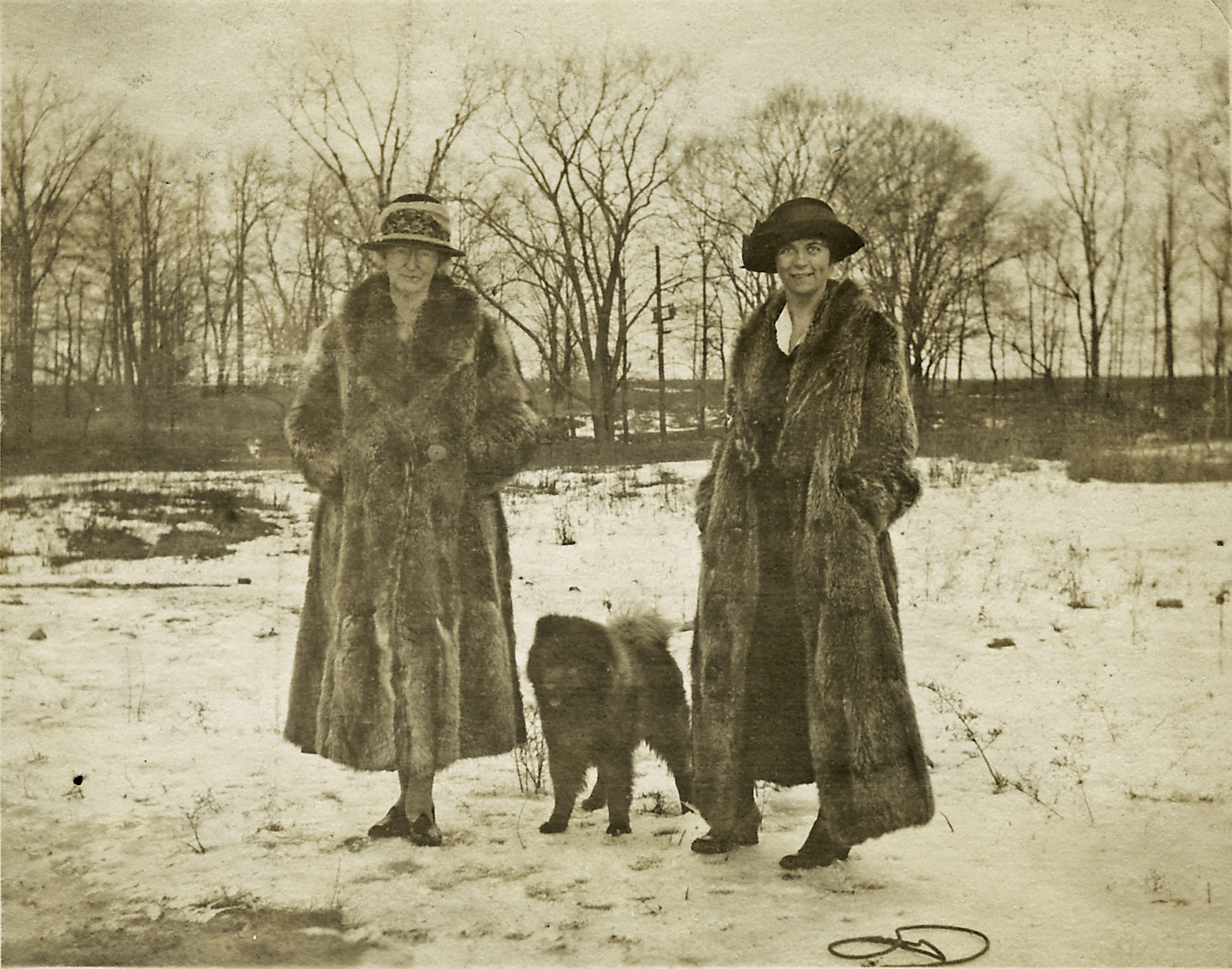
Molly Dewson and Polly Porter, Van Cortlandt Park, Bronx 1925

By 1915, Dewson was involved in the Massachusetts campaign for women's suffrage. During World War I, she and her partner, Polly Porter, went with the American Red Cross to France to aid war refugees. Dewson was chief of the Mediterranean Zone by war's end. After returning from Europe, Dewson worked as Florence Kelley's principal assistant in the National Consumers' League campaign for state minimum wage laws for women and children. From 1925 to 1931, Dewson served as president of the New York Consumers' League, working closely with Eleanor Roosevelt (ER), leading the lobbying effort of the Women's Joint Legislative Conference and playing a central role in the passage of a 1930 New York law limiting women to forty-eight-hour work weeks. As president of the New York Consumers' League, Dewson worked and socialized with Frances Perkins and Clara Mortenson Beyer, both of would go on to work in the United States Department of Labor under President Roosevelt, and who played important roles in New Deal era labor economics.

Mary W. Dewon started her career in Massachusetts reform and suffrage circles. In the 1920s in New York she was a civic secretary of the Women's City Club of New York, and the research secretary of the National Consumers' League. By 1929 Dewson knew all of the leading women reformers in the city. Because of Dewson's connections Eleanor Roosevelt recruited her into the Democratic political party. It was during this time that Dewson entered politics more personally, organizing Democratic women for Al Smith's presidential campaign at Eleanor Roosevelt's request. She performed a similar feat for Franklin D. Roosevelt's 1930 gubernatorial and 1932 presidential races. Because of her work on FDR's campaigns (and ER's intense lobbying), Dewson was appointed head of the Democratic National Committee's Women's Division (DNC). She reorganized the division to be utterly different. She found government jobs for female party workers, more than had been given to women under any previous administration. She is credited with securing the post of secretary of labor for Frances Perkins, and placing women high up in the Social Security and National Recovery Administrations. Even so, she opposed the Equal Rights Amendment. Despite this opposition, she began to push for state laws or state party rulings that would provide even representation in membership and leadership positions for women on party committees from the precinct level up. She created the Reporter Plan, which educated female party workers on New Deal programs so that they could explain them to voters. In the 1936 election, the women's division provided 90 percent of the campaign fliers the DNC produced. That same year she got a rule passed that provided for a member and an alternate for each state on the DNC Platform Committee; the rule also required that each pair be composed of one man and one woman. Because of Dewson's organizational skills, FDR nicknamed her "the little general."

She withdrew from the women's division's day-to-day affairs in 1936 because of poor health, but continued to be available to her successors. In 1937 she again returned to active public life when she was nominated and confirmed as a member of the Social Security Board. There she set up effective systems of federal-state cooperation, an issue that had been problematic. However, she again had to step down because of illness in 1938.

== Personal life ==
Dewson met her life partner Mary "Polly" Porter in 1909, when both women were working at the Massachusetts State Industrial School for Girls. Dewson was then director of the parole board and living with her mother, and Porter, ten years her junior, was working an internship as part of her studies at the Massachusetts School for Social Work. The two became a couple and moved in together in 1912, after the death of Dewson’s mother. They were together for more than fifty years, until Dewson's death in 1962. Throughout their lives together, the two women referred to themselves as the Porter-Dewsons.

In 1913, the Porter-Dewsons bought a dairy farm near the central Massachusetts hamlet of South Berlin and briefly became "gentlewoman farmers." After serving in Europe during World War I, the couple moved to New York City. By 1927, they had an apartment in the city's Greenwich Village neighborhood. Their building, at 171 West 12th Street, contained the apartments of two other notable female couples. Feminists Nancy Cook and Marion Dickerman lived there, as did Communist Party activists Grace Hutchins and Anna Rochester.

In 1911, Dewson visited Polly Porter's family summer home in Castine, Maine, and the couple made frequent visits there during the summers. In 1952, they retired to Castine full-time. Dewson became the vice-president of the Maine Democratic Advisory Committee in 1954. Dewson died in Castine on October 21, 1962.
