= Grace Hutchins =

American labor reformer, researcher, journalist, activist and communist

- Born: August 19, 1885; Boston, Massachusetts, US
- Died: July 15, 1969 (aged 83); New York City, New York, US
- Occupations: Educator; political activist; Christian pacifist; labor reformer
- Organizations: Communist Party; Society of the Companions of the Holy Cross; Fellowship of Reconciliation; Federated Press

Grace Hutchins (August 19, 1885 – July 15, 1969) was an American labor reformer and researcher, journalist, political activist and communist. She spent many years of her life writing about labor and economics, in addition to being a lifelong dedicated member of the Communist Party, along with Anna Rochester, a Marxist economist and historian and her companion of 45 years. Together they were known for promoting radical Christian pacifism in the United States, although Hutchins was also regularly involved in strikes, demonstrations and labor disputes.

== Background ==
Grace Hutchins was born in an upper-class family in Boston in 1885, the third daughter of five children to Susan (née Barnes-Hurd) and Edward Hutchins. Her ancestors, originally from England, had settled in Massachusetts during the colonial period. Her father was an attorney who helped found the Legal Aid Society, while her mother was involved in various hospitals in the city; they were both actively involved in the Episcopal Trinity Church.

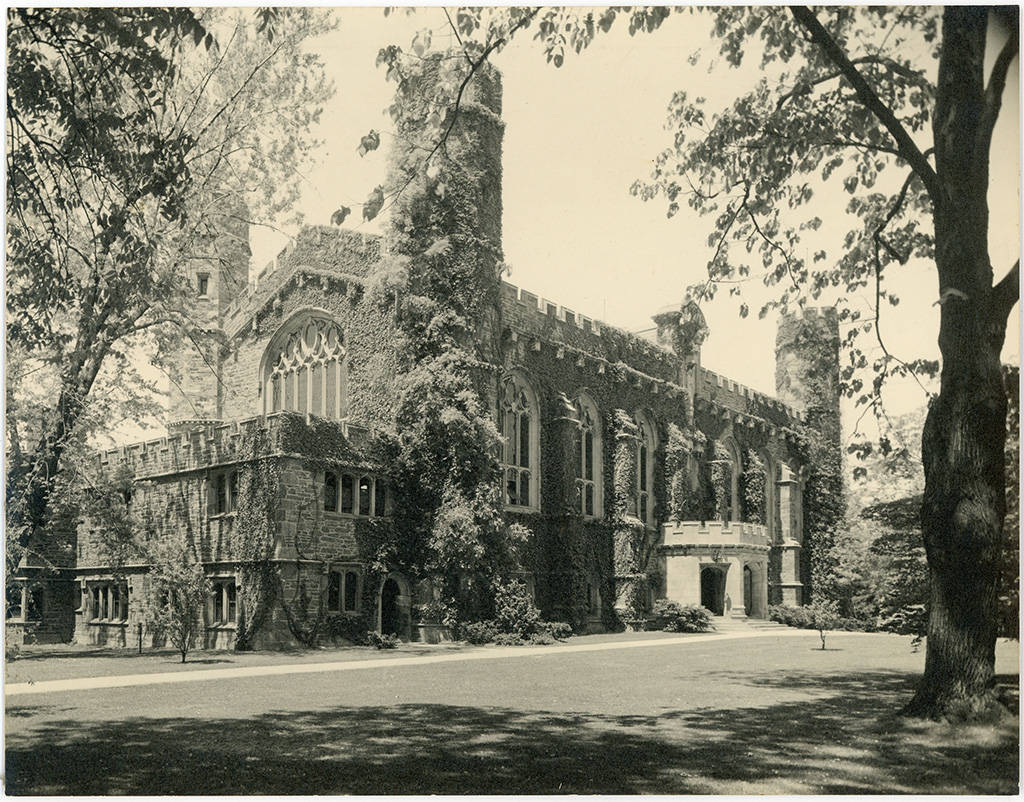
Great Hall of Old Library, Bryn Mawr College.

Hutchins was privately educated, and accompanied her parents on a world tour from 1898 to 1899. She then attended the women's college at Bryn Mawr, which was relatively new at the time. During her college life, she "excelled" in basketball, field hockey, and tennis. Outside of sports, she was also involved in advocating for women's suffrage. She graduated in 1907, and remained in touch with her classmates later in life.

== Career ==
=== Academics ===
Within a few years of leaving college, Hutchins became an Episcopalian missionary teacher for Church Missionary Society in China and taught at St. Hilda's school in South China in 1912, later becoming a headmistress. During her time in China, she kept a diary on her observations of Chinese women's social, educational, and medical conditions. During her stay in China, Hutchins became ill and returned to the United States in 1916, partially due to parental concerns. Back in the United States, she was employed by a social training school.

=== Activism ===
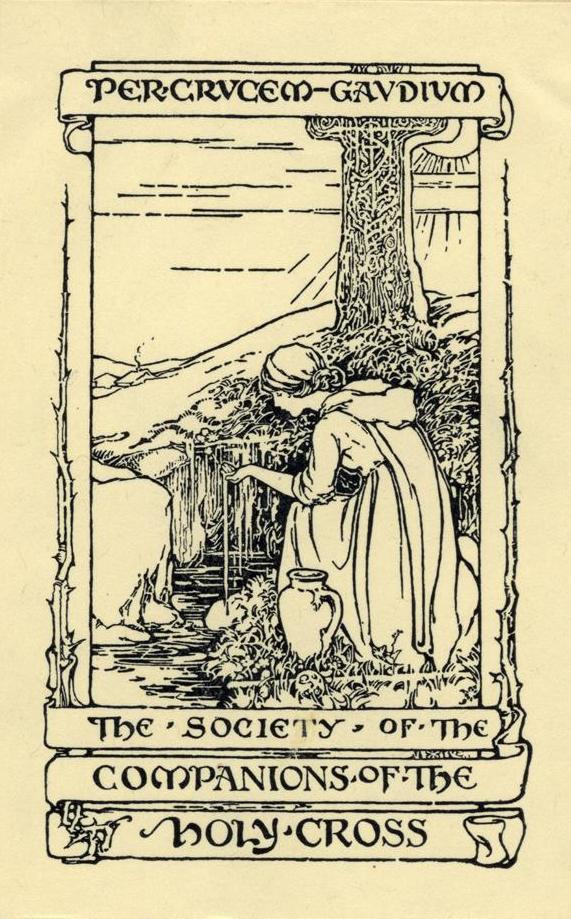
Society of the Companions of the Holy Cross, bookplate by Margaret Ely Webb

In response to the ongoing Great War, Hutchins took an anti-interventionist position and began shifting toward socialism in her political stance. When the US entered the war with the Allies in 1917, she found herself in protests against the war. Her political stance impacted her private life, and nearly led to her dismissal from the school where she was employed.

Living in New York, Hutchins met Anna Rochester in 1919 at an annual retreat when she joined the Society of the Companions of the Holy Cross through her involvement with teaching the New Testament. Both Rochester and Hutchins were firm adherents to the doctrine of nonviolence, and in 1920 Hutchins joined the Fellowship of Reconciliation (FOR), which promoted pacifism in the United States. She became a secretary and public speaker for the organization. She served as a press secretary from 1924 to 1926, during which time she also served as a business executive while actively contributing to the monthly magazine.

From 1920 to 1921, she studied labor issues at the New York School of Social Work, and then went on to Columbia University's Teacher College for the following two years. It was during this period that she was suggested to have "learned firsthand" on many women's labor conditions by working "ten-hour days in a cigar factory".

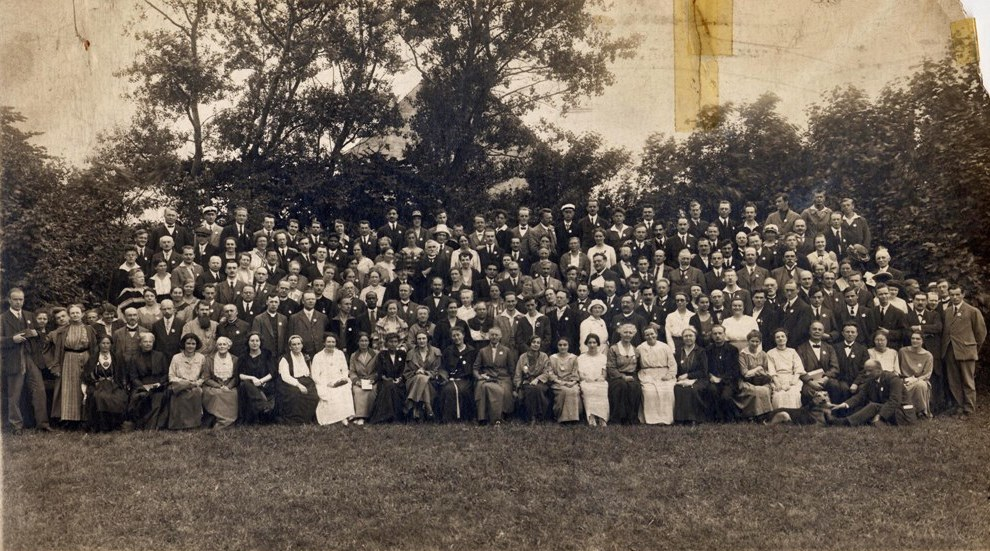
International Fellowship of Reconciliation conference, Nyborg, Denmark, 1923 (attendees pictured include: Oliver Dryer, Halvad Laange, Matilda Wrede, Helena Dudley, Grace Hutchins, Kirsten Svelmoe-Thomsen, Lilian Stevenson, Pierre Ceresole, Beatrice Haystead [Hoystead?], Friedrich Siegmund-Schultze, George Davies, Max Metzger, Leyton Richards, Alfred Peter, Anna Rochester, Ethel Stevenson)

The Companions' reading lists for their annual retreats revolved around the works of Christian socialists such as Walter Rauschenbusch and Edward Carpenter, and Hutchins also read more traditional writers such Karl Marx and Friedrich Engels. One contemporary influence appears to have been Vida Scudder. Her career was focused upon the health and welfare of working class women and children. According to Janet Lee, author of a biography about the two women, they "were a part of [a] cohort of women whose commitment to social activism was integrated with their lesbian orientation".

In the early 1920s Hutchins and Rochester travelled through Europe together on behalf of the FOR, eventually traveling as far as India and the Far East. They regularly met other activists of social reform, as well as visiting factories to observe; they were not only "appalled by what they saw," but kept up a regular correspondence in the American press regarding the poor working conditions they witnessed. By 1927, Hutchins was employed by the Federated Press. At this time, she and Rochester were also traveling through the Soviet Union. In contrast to the poverty and poor conditions she had witnessed in India, Hutchins was impressed by their collective attempts under communism to overcome the deprivations the country faced. However, their views clashed with the views of FOR, and they consequently left the organization for good on their 1927 return to the United States, instead joining the Communist Party. During this time, Hutchins observed the textile strikes of New Jersey and Massachusetts in 1924 and 1928 respectively.

In 1927, she was employed as a researcher for the Bureau of Women in Industry by the New York State Department of Labor. Due to her health conditions however, she had to resign from the position five months later. Later that year, Hutchins and Rochester along with Robert W. Dunn founded the Labor Research Association (LRA), the purpose of which was to compile and collate facts, statistics and reports for trade unions and writers. Hutchins remains associated with LRA until 1967. During that time, she was once arrested for demonstrating against the executions of Nicola Sacco and Bartolomeo Vanzetti in Boston.

Already a treasurer for the Communist Party's national campaign financing group, she ran for state office as Alderman (1935), Controller (1935), and Lieutenant-Governor (1948), although she lost each election. A Communist party candidate, she ran for state comptroller in 1936.

From 1940 to 1956, Hutchins was a shareholder in the communist Daily Worker newspaper. Hutchins was a trustee of the Bail Bond fund of the Civil Rights Congress, which supported people who were defending themselves in the Smith Act trials, She personally posted the $10,000 bail for Elizabeth Gurley Flynn after the latter's 1951 indictment.

In 1948, during the Alger Hiss espionage trial, Hutchins was accused by Whittaker Chambers of threatening death from the Party after he defected. Hutchins condemned the accusations in various interviews and publications.

In 1951, Hutchins testified before a House Un-American Activities subcommittee due to her contributions to Communist publications, like The New Masses and Daily Worker, and her political campaigns for the Community party. Hutchins herself believed, as she told The Worker, that Marxism "explained the economic basis for the exploitation of women workers as no one ever did before."

== Personal life and death ==
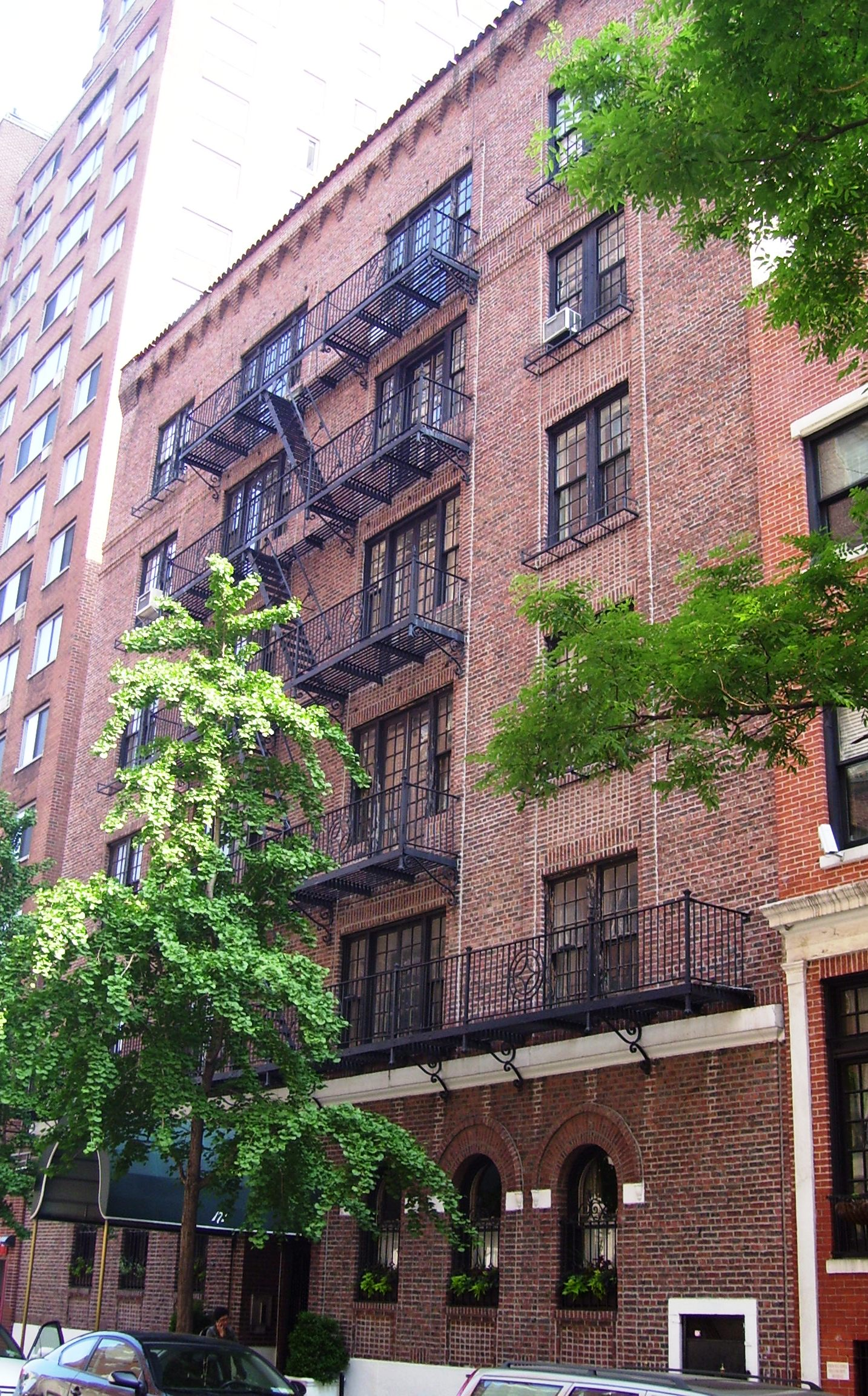
171 West 12th Street in the Greenwich Village Historic District of New York City

Hutchins is known to have had a close personal relationship with Anna Rochester, and their relationship lasted forty years, living in New York's Greenwich Village. In 1924, the couple moved into an apartment at 85 Bedford Street, where they lived the rest of their lives.

She has been described as "exud[ing] warmth, building families among those near her, shaping her feminism around women's traditional and potential strengths and insisting on women's economic independence as the key to liberation". Conversely, in 1948, during the Alger Hiss espionage trial, she was accused by Whittaker Chambers of threatening to kill him after he left the Party. Hutchins denied the offence, and condemned the accusations in various interviews and publications. Her father did not approve of her political activities, and he was disappointed about her 1927 arrest. Regardless, he did continue to provide a good allowance for her livelihood and, when he died, remembered her in his will.

Anna Rochester died age 86 on May 11, 1966, of pneumonia; Hutchins died age 83 on July 15, 1969, at their home after extended illness.

== Legacy ==
Biographer Julia M. Allen noted that, by the 1930s, Hutchins was one of a few women who still saw women as being oppressed and later as one of the few who "worked to keep feminism alive in the United States during the 1930s to the 1950s." Her papers were collated in the Special Collections and University Archives at the University of Oregon, along with Rochester's. Allen holds that Hutchins and Rochester believed and worked towards "revolution not reformation" and that that accounted for their many switches between organizations. It has been suggested that what brought the two women together was "the waged and political work" that they shared.

== Works ==
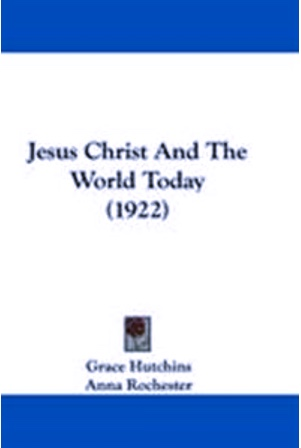
Jesus Christ and the World Today, 1922, book cover.

Hutchins's writings focus primarily on labor conditions for women and children. She co-edited several reference series for the group, as well as editing the group's own magazine, Railroad Notes between 1937 and 1962.

Books

Hutchins published three books:

- Jesus Christ and the World Today with Anna Rochester (1922)
- Labor and Silk (1929) concerned textile working conditions, based on 1920s strike experiences
- Women Who Work (1933), used by both the CPUSA and US unions as a campaign reference work and re-published three times
