= Anna Rochester =

American labor reformer, journalist and activist (1880–1966)

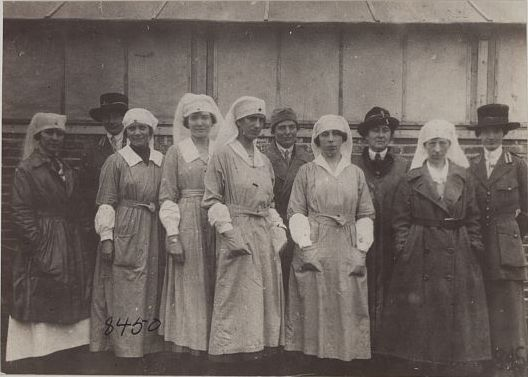
- Group of ARC workers at a Red Cross canteen Left to right : Miss Anna L. Rochester, Miss Gladys Cromwell, Miss Elizabeth Strang, Miss Helen J. Day, Miss C. Wheller, Mrs. Mary Palmer Gardner, Miss Winifred Bryce, Miss Anna A. Ryan, Miss Julia Wells and Miss Dorothy Cromwell, ARC Hospitals Nos. 6 & 7, Souilly, Meuse, France, October 13, 1918
- Born: March 30, 1880; New York City, New York, U.S.
- Died: May 11, 1966 (aged 86); New York City, New York, U.S.
- Resting place: Brookside Cemetery (Englewood, New Jersey)

Anna Rochester (March 30, 1880 — May 11, 1966) was an American labor reformer, journalist, political activist, and Communist. Although for several years an editor of the liberal monthly The World Tomorrow, Rochester is best remembered as a co-founder of the Labor Research Association, a bureau which collected and interpreted labor statistics in close coordination with the Communist Party USA.

In the 21st century Rochester became the subject of academic interest for the duality of her public political activity with the maintenance of a long-term same-sex affectionate relationship with fellow communist Grace Hutchins, a relationship considered taboo according to the social mores of the day. Although the pair lived as partners for over 40 years, Rochester never self-identified as a lesbian and the question of whether the pair were sexually intimate remains unresolved.

== Biography ==
=== Early years ===
Anna Rochester was born March 30, 1880, in New York City. She was the daughter of Roswell Hart Rochester, an executive who worked as Treasurer of the Western Union Telegraph Company, and his wife, the former Louise Agatha Bauman, who had been a public school teacher before her marriage. Anna was the couple's only child. Unlike many of the participants in the American radical movement of her era, the Rochester family had long roots in the United States, with her father's paternal grandfather, Nathaniel Rochester, the namesake and founder of the city of Rochester, New York.

Anna spent her developmental years in privilege in the city of Englewood, New Jersey, a comfortable suburb of New York City. The Rochester family lived in a large and well equipped home, employing attendants to help raise the child and servants to keep the household running. Anna traveled extensively as a young girl, studied music in Germany, and received a first-class private school education at the Dwight School for Girls. She exhibited intelligence and a penchant for scholarship at a comparatively young age, and briefly aspired to the advanced study of mathematics.

The Rochesters were a religious family and Anna was raised as a Protestant in the Episcopal Church, attending her first church service when she was just 5 and undergoing confirmation as a member of the church in 1894, at the age of 14. Anna was strongly imbued with the moral code of the church, which stressed simplicity, modesty, and service to others. Her religious fervor would continue to develop in her late teen years.

Rochester was admitted to Bryn Mawr College, one of America's premier women's liberal arts universities, located ten miles west of Philadelphia. Her coursework proceeded as well as could be expected, but she found her collegiate career cut short by family matters, with her father dying of a heart attack in the middle of her freshman year and her mother falling ill of "nervous collapse" near the end of her sophomore session. This would mark the end of Rochester's tenure at Bryn Mawr. Anna became her mother's caretaker, visiting the spas of Europe and vacationing at summer resorts in search of a "cure."

The summer of 1904 mother and daughter spent at a new resort, Philbrook Farm of Shelburne, New Hampshire. It was there that Rochester met Vida Dutton Scudder, a political activist motivated by the social gospel, and her lesbian partner, the writer Florence Converse. The connection proved both politically and socially illuminating. A male suitor was turned away in 1907, and a return to Philbrook Farm in 1908 invigorated Rochester's interest in sociology and the ongoing progressive campaign to ameliorate the ills of modern industrial society. Her discovery that same summer of Walter Rauschenbusch's seminal book, Christianity and the Social Crisis, completed Rochester's conversion from socialite to social activist.

=== Labor reformer ===
From 1912 until 1915, Rochester worked as a researcher and for the publicity department of the National Child Labor Committee, a private non-profit organization established in 1904 to help end child labor. Rochester continued in this same area in 1915 when she moved to the United States Children's Bureau, a government agency created in 1912, where she again worked on research and publications. She would remain with the US Children's Bureau through 1921.

In 1922 Rochester assumed the editorship of The World Tomorrow, a Christian socialist monthly magazine which had been founded in 1918 by the pacifism Fellowship of Reconciliation and which was formerly edited by future Socialist Party leader Norman Thomas.

=== Death and legacy ===
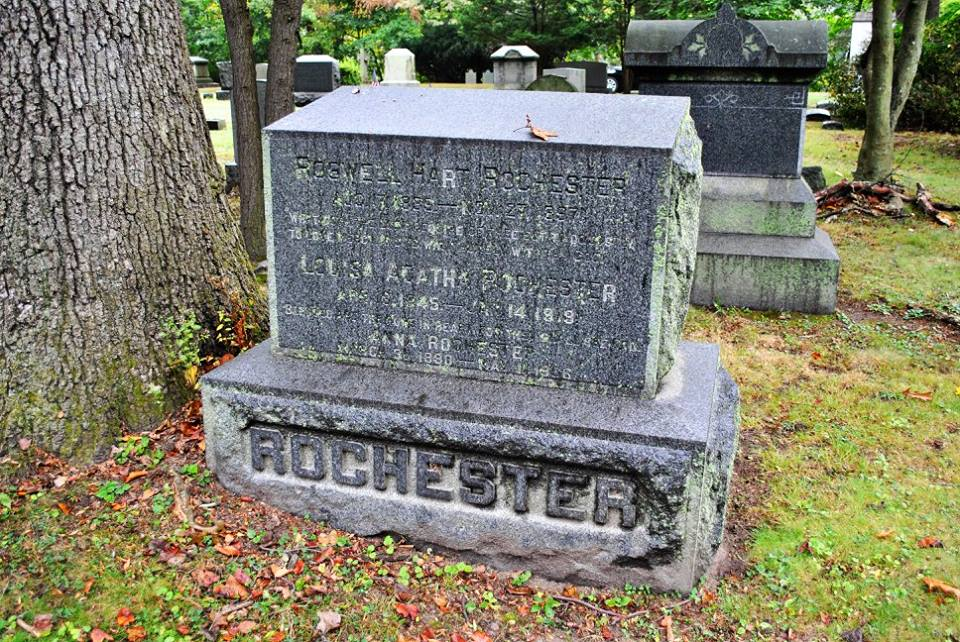
Brookside Cemetery

Anna Rochester died of pneumonia on May 11, 1966, in New York City. She was 86 years old at the time of her death. She is buried at Brookside Cemetery, Englewood, with her parents.

Anna Rochester's papers reside in the Special Collections department of Knight Library at the University of Oregon in Eugene.

== Works ==
- The Eight Hour Day for Children. New York: National Child Labor Committee, 1914.
- Newspapers and Child Labor. New York: National Child Labor Committee, n.d. [c. 1914].
- Children at Work on Men's Clothing. Child Labor in the Glass Industry. New York: National Child Labor Committee, 1914.
- Child Labor in Warring Countries: A Brief Review of Foreign Reports. Washington, DC: US Government Printing Office, 1917.
- Summary of Child-Welfare Laws Passed in 1916. With Lulu L Eckman and Ella Arvilla Merritt. Washington, DC: US Government Printing Office, 1917.
- Jesus Christ and the World Today. With Grace Hutchins. New York: George H. Doran, 1922.
- Infant Mortality: Results of a Field Study in Baltimore, Md., Based on Births in One Year. With Grace Lynde Meigs Crowder, Estelle B Hunter, Emma Duke, and Robert Morse Woodbury. Washington, DC: US Government Printing Office, 1923.
- Labor and Coal. New York: International Publishers, 1931.
- Profits and Wages: Employers' Incomes and Workers' Earnings. New York: International Publishers, 1932.
- Wall Street. New York: International Publishers, 1932.
- Your Dollar Under Roosevelt. New York: Workers Library Publishers, 1933.
- Profit and Wages: The Effect of the Crisis on Employers' Incomes and Workers' Earnings. New York: Workers Library Publishers, 1933.
- The Miners' Road to Freedom in a Soviet America. With Pat Toohey. New York: Workers Library Publishers, 1935.
- Rulers of America: A Study of Finance Capital. New York: International Publishers, 1936.
- Why Farmers Are Poor: The Agricultural Crisis in the United States. New York: International Publishers, 1940.
- "The Farm Problem and the Working Class," The Communist, June 1940, pp. 565–574.
- Lenin on the Agrarian Question. New York: International Publishers, 1942.
- Farmers in Nazi Germany. New York: Farm Research, Inc., 1942.
- The Populist Movement in the United States: The Rise, Growth, and Decline of the People's Party — A Social and Economic Interpretation. New York: International Publishers, 1943.
- Farmers and the War. New York: Workers Library Publishers, 1943,
- The Nature of Capitalism. New York: International Publishers, 1946. (a revised version of the author's Capitalism and Progress published a year earlier)
- American Capitalism: 1607-1800. New York: International Publishers, 1949.
