= List of public dispensaries =

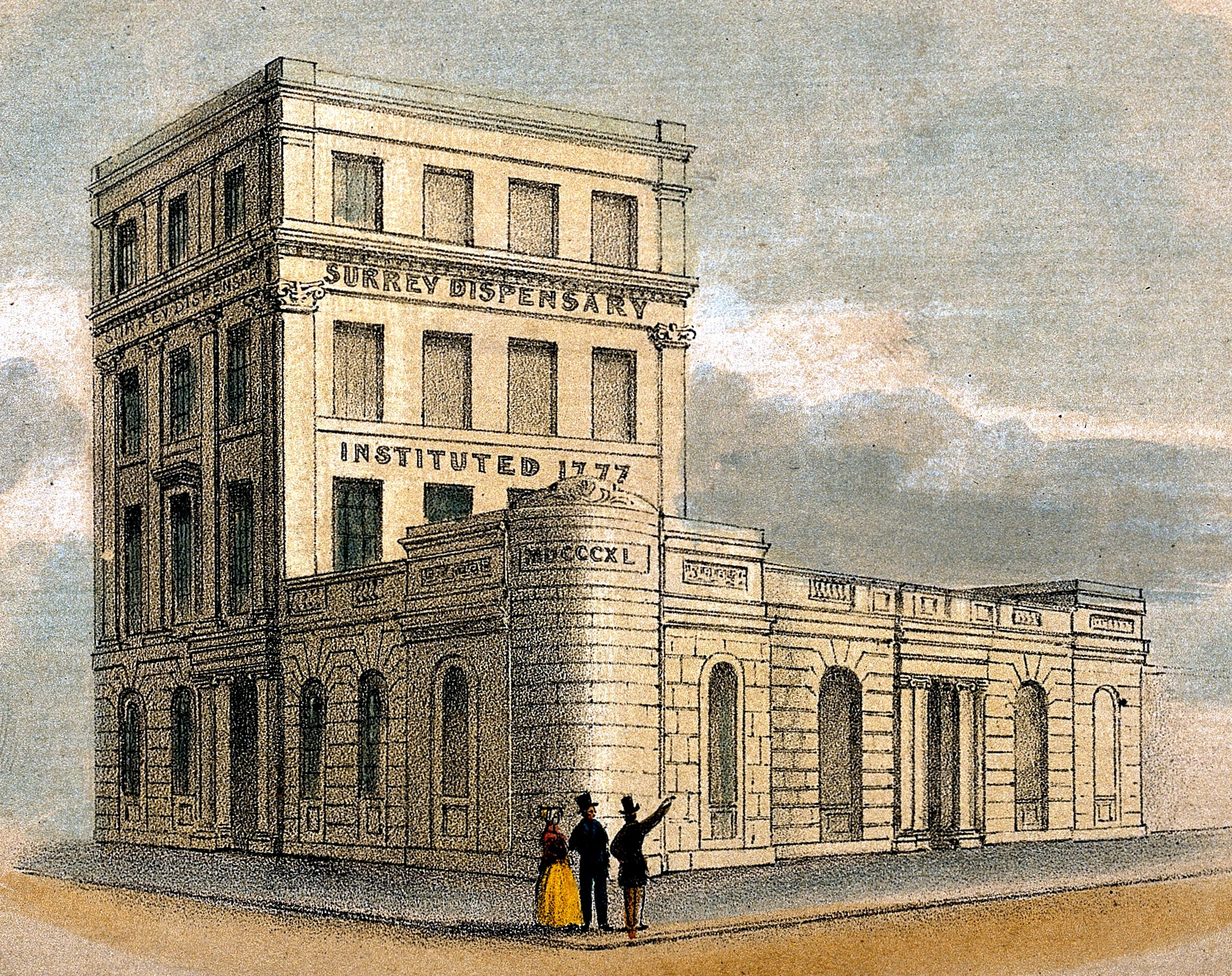
The Surrey Dispensary, in Southwark (now an area of central London). Coloured lithograph by R. Alford, c.1840.

A public dispensary provides "outpatient medical treatment and advice to patients, in contrast to the inpatient service provided by hospitals". Examples include:

== Australia ==
- Sydney Dispensary, Australia, founded 1826

== Canada ==
- Toronto Western Hospital, Canada, founded as a public dispensary in 1895

== India ==
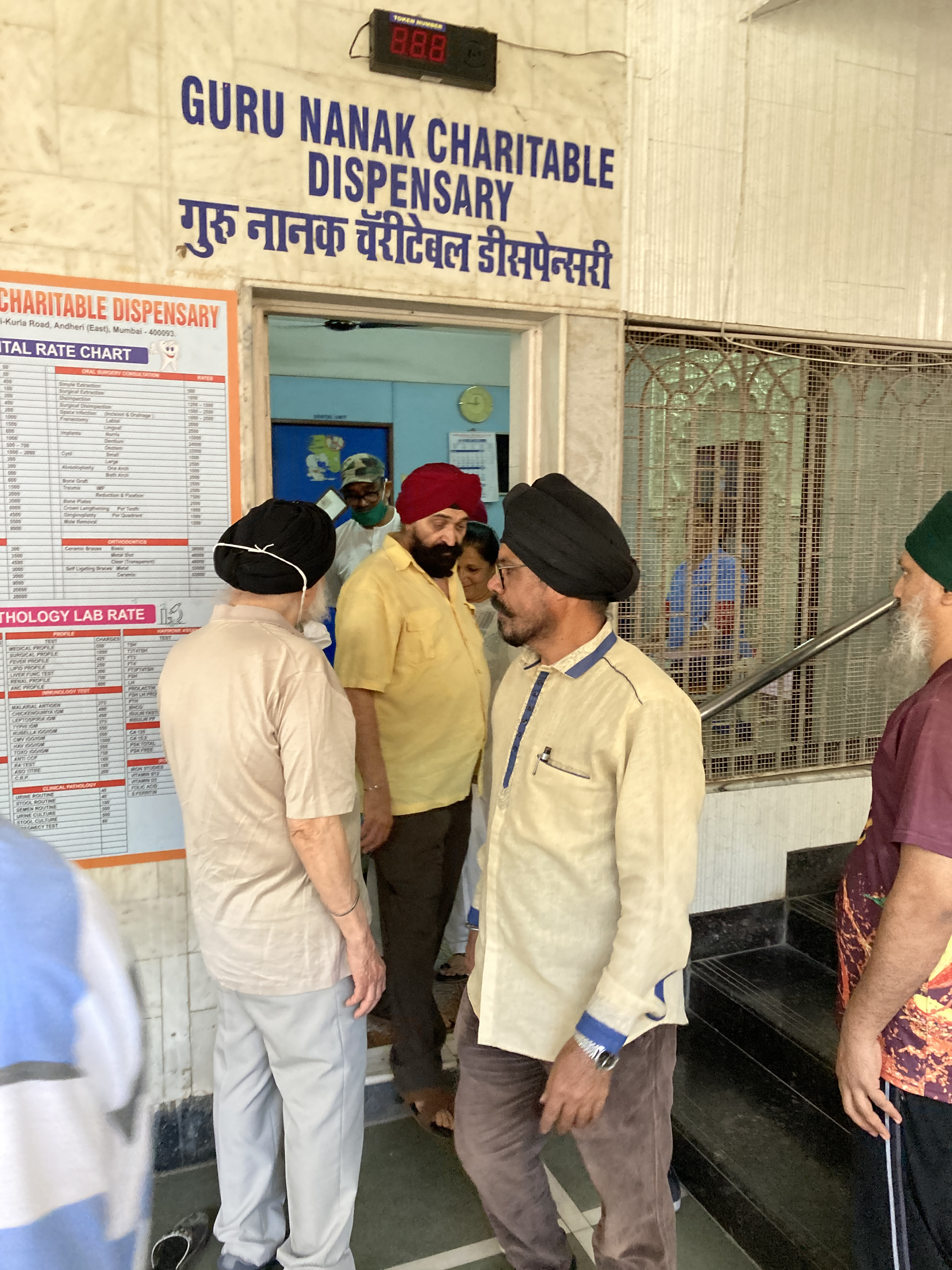
Guru Nanak Punjabi Sabha Charitable Dispensary in Chakala, Mumbai

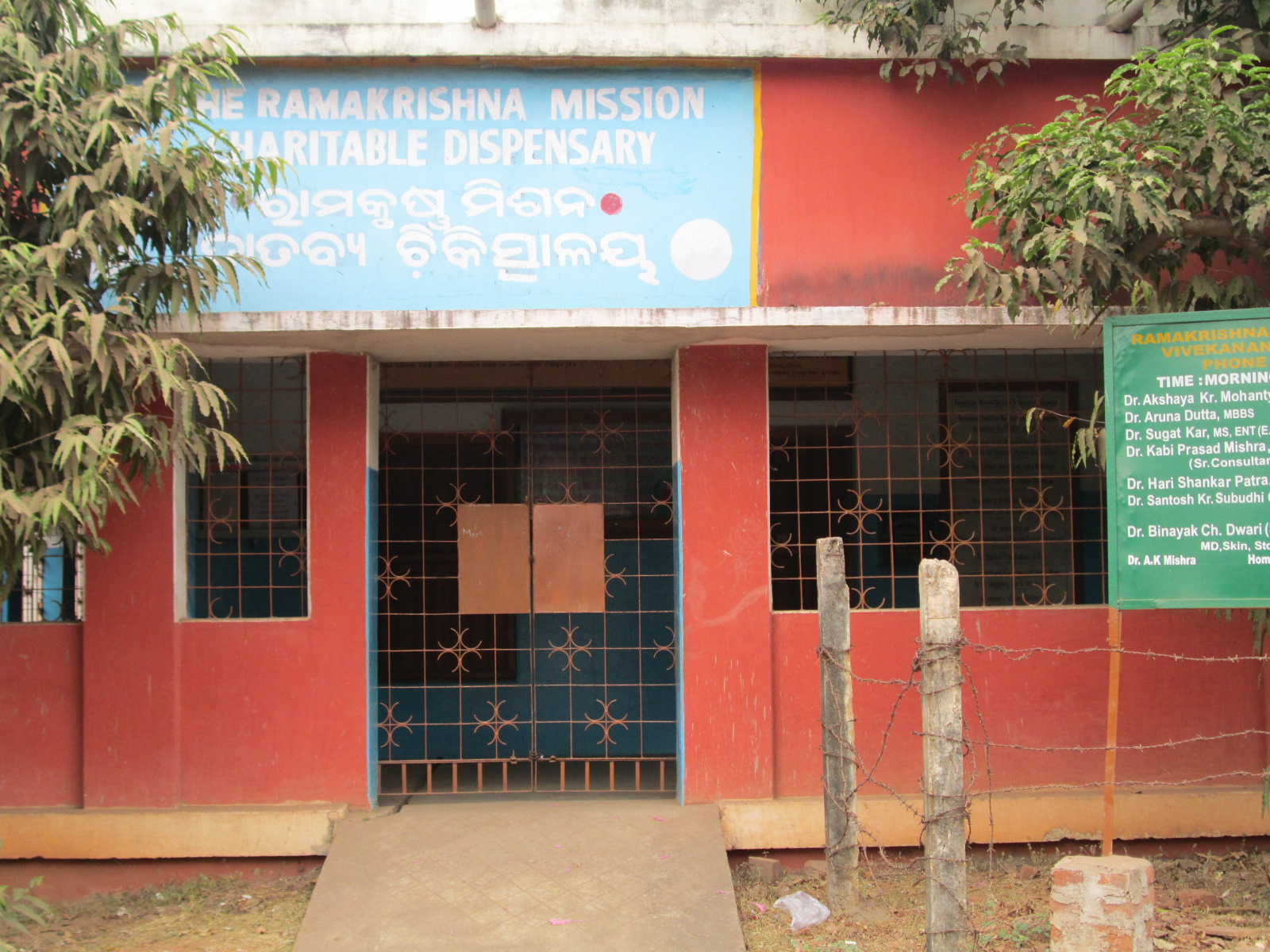
A charitable dispensary in Bhubaneswar, India

- Guru Nanak Charitable Dispensary, Chakala, Mumbai
- Ramakrishna Mission Ashrama, Kanpur
- Ramakrishna Mission Vidyapith, Purulia

== United Kingdom ==
=== London ===
- The Foundery free dispensary in Moorfields, was opened by Methodist preacher John Wesley in 1746
- Finsbury Dispensary, London, founded 1780
- St. Mary's Dispensary for Women, London, founded 1866
- Surrey Dispensary, founded 1777
- Warwick Lane dispensary, London 1688–1725
- St. Martin's Lane dispensary
- General Dispensary, Aldersgate Street

=== Elsewhere in England ===
- Ardwick and Ancoats Dispensary, Manchester, England. Founded in 1828 and managed under the auspices of the Provident Dispernsary Association from 1875
- Hereford Dispensary, Hereford, England. Founded in 1835.

=== Elsewhere in the U.K. ===
- Edinburgh Provident Dispensary for Women and Children, Scotland, founded 1878
- Public Dispensary of Edinburgh, Scotland, founded 1776 (received royal charter in 1818 to become Royal Public Dispensary of Edinburgh)

== United States ==
- Boston Dispensary
- Baltimore General Dispensary
- Evening Dispensary For Working Women and Girls, Baltimore

== Other countries ==
- Dispensary for Chinese at Macau, founded in 1820 by the Scottish missionary Robert Morrison and John Livingstone, a surgeon with the East India Company
