= Abortion in Maryland =

2024 Maryland Question 1 results map by county

Abortion in Maryland is legal at all stages of pregnancy.

In March 2023, the Maryland House of Delegates and the Maryland Senate voted to enshrine a broad right to abortion access into the state constitution. The constitutional amendment received approval by the voters in November 2024. In April 2022, the Maryland General Assembly passed the Abortion Care Access Act. The bill allows a broader range of qualified healthcare workers—nurse practitioners, nurse midwives, and physician assistants—to perform abortions and allocates $3.5 million to a new program within the Maryland Department of Health to train healthcare workers. Additionally, the bill requires the majority of health insurance plans, including private health insurance plans, to cover abortions cost free. The legislation was enacted in 2022 with a gubernatorial veto override.

A voter referendum adding abortion rights to the state constitution passed in 2024.

== Historical practices ==
Abortion has been documented since the colonial period in Maryland. Abortion practices included the use of herbal remedies such as opium, savin (see Juniperus Sabina) and other herbs that caused the body to "purge". These practices are mainly recorded in the context of legal proceedings, such as a 1663 case in which a Maryland doctor was accused of administering an abortifacient to a servant he impregnated, though the case was not prosecuted.

Other herbal remedies included snakeroot, (also known as Polygala senega), to induce abortion. A medical student at the University of Pennsylvania by the name of Thomas Massie wrote in his 1803 doctoral dissertation that snakeroot was used as an abortifacient, citing a physician in Harford County, Maryland who reported its use among the rural population there.

Midwives also performed abortions throughout the nineteenth and early twentieth centuries. Progressive-era public health reformers in Baltimore sought to restrict midwifery, and conducted a survey in 1909 in which they claimed that 32% of the city's midwives were "suspected of criminal practice," that is, of providing abortion services. This Progressive coalition was made up of white, middle-class physicians, nurses, and female reformers, such as doctors Mary Sherwood and Lilian Welsh, who characterized midwifery and abortion as vices of the immigrant and African American lower classes. Historian Leslie Reagan points out that physicians were also performing abortions at this time, but sought to direct enforcement towards midwives and lower-class patients.

The first laws regulating abortion in the state were passed in 1867, banning abortion except by a physician to "secure the safety of the mother."

In 1968, Maryland enacted a law allowing abortion in hospital settings in cases of rape, severe fetal deformity, or when life and health were endangered.

In 1973, the Supreme Court's decision in Roe v. Wade made abortion legal without restrictions until the third trimester of pregnancy, overruling Maryland law. After Roe, clinics opened in the state to provide abortions outside of hospitals, and Planned Parenthood began providing outpatient abortion services. In 1991 the Maryland General Assembly passed a law that codified Roe v. Wade, which was upheld in a public referendum.

Dobbs v. Jackson Women's Health Organization overturned the federally-protected right to abortion in 2022; abortion remains legal in Maryland.

== Legislative history ==
Both medical and procedural abortion were widely practiced throughout the United States in the early 19th century, often by midwives, homeopaths, and others without medical degrees. By the 1850s, physicians wished to push these practitioners out of the medical marketplace and assert greater control over reproduction and gender roles. Maryland was listed among states with no criminal abortion law by Dr. Horatio Storer, a leader of the campaign by physicians to enact abortion bans. The first law regulating abortion in Maryland was passed in 1867 and completely banned the procedure, but there was no enabling clause in the bill, leaving it unenforceable. A second law was passed in 1868, banning abortion except by a physician, after consulting "one or more respectable physicians," to "secure the safety of the mother." The vague language of this law exposed physicians and hospitals to legal risk.

From the 1930s onward, physicians began seeking greater authority to determine the need for therapeutic abortion without risking legal consequences. This reform movement influenced the American Law Institute (ALI) Model Penal Code of 1962, which proposed legalizing abortion to preserve the health (whether physical or mental) of the mother, as well as if the pregnancy is due to incest or rape, or if doctors agree that there is a significant risk that the child will be born with a serious mental or physical defect. A law derived from the ALI Model Penal Code was passed in Maryland in 1968.

On May 26, 1970, Governor Marvin Mandel vetoed legislation that would have removed all state restrictions on abortions. Mandel cited concerns that the bill included no residency requirement, that the partner and/or parent(s) of the pregnant woman would not be notified, and that the law would "allow an abortion, even in the eighth or ninth month of pregnancy". Heavy lobbying surrounded the bill. The medical community advocated for its passing while the Catholic Church lobbied against it.

The U.S. Supreme Court's Roe v. Wade ruling in 1973, which legalized abortion until the third trimester of pregnancy, overruled Maryland's previous abortion laws. During the 1970s, three Maryland laws attempted to place restrictions on abortion access: a 1975 law banned referral fees to abortion referral agencies; a 1977 parental notification law was ruled unconstitutional; a 1979 "information before abortion" law required abortion-seekers to be given a pamphlet promoting alternatives.

In 1991 Maryland passed a law, signed by Governor William Donald Schaefer, that codified Roe v. Wade, guaranteeing the right to abortion and repealing the earlier "information before abortion" act. Anti-abortion groups successfully petitioned to bring the law to a public referendum. Question 6, to uphold the abortion rights bill, passed in 1992 with 62% of voters in favor and 38% opposed.

In Maryland in 2013, according to The New York Times, something "rare in this era of polarized abortion politics" occurred when laws that significantly tightened the licensing and inspection of abortion clinics were supported by those on both sides of the abortion issue.

Two bills for six-week abortion bans, called "fetal heartbeat bills" by proponents, were filed in the Maryland House of Delegates in 2019 and failed. On February 8, 2019, Ric Metzgar filed HB 933. On February 8, 2019, Robin L. Grammer, Jr. filed HB 978, a bill entitled "Keep Our Hearts Beating Act". In 2019, Former Maryland House Speaker Michael Busch proposed an amendment to the state's constitution to enshrine the right for women to have an abortion. His replacement, Maryland House Speaker Adrienne Jones, said she would try to re-introduce the amendment in 2020 in response to the abortion bans in the states of Alabama and Georgia.

In March 2023, the Maryland House of Delegates and the Maryland Senate voted to enshrine a broad right to abortion access into the state constitution. The constitutional amendment received approval by the voters in November 2024. In April 2022, the Maryland General Assembly passed the Abortion Care Access Act. The bill allows a broader range of qualified healthcare workers—nurse practitioners, nurse midwives, and physician assistants—to perform abortions and allocates $3.5 million to a new program within the Maryland Department of Health to train healthcare workers. Additionally, the bill requires the majority of health insurance plans, including private health insurance plans, to cover abortions cost free. The legislation was enacted in 2022 with a gubernatorial veto override.

In February 2024, the Moore administration announced over $15 million in grant awards and a budget proposal to further improve reproductive health care and abortion access in Maryland. It includes $10.6 million in grant funding awarded to the University of Maryland, Baltimore (UMB) to administer the state's Abortion Care Clinical Training Program. Specifically aiming to train clinicians in rural and underserved areas of the state. The administration also is proposing for FY 2025, that $5 million be allocated to increase Medicaid provider reimbursement for reproductive services and abortion care.

== Judicial history ==
Prosecutions of abortion were rare in colonial Maryland, and often linked with other offenses. In 1663 John Lombrozo was presented by a Charles County jury for provoking an abortion for his indentured servant Elizabeth Wiles whom he had raped. He had already been in court for blasphemy and sexual offenses. When he married Wiles, charges were dropped. Arrests of abortion providers became more common in Maryland from the 1940s through 60s with increased law enforcement. This led to notable criminal cases including the prosecutions and appeals of Dr. George Lotrell Timanus (Adams, Nelson, and Timanus vs. State), Dr. Milan Vuitch (Vuitch vs. State), and other physician and non-physician providers.

The US Supreme Court's decision in 1973's Roe v. Wade ruling meant states could no longer regulate abortion until the third trimester. Previous abortion convictions under Maryland state law were overturned. In 2022, the US Supreme Court overturned Roe v. Wade in Dobbs v. Jackson Women's Health Organization, No. 19-1392, 597 U.S. ___ (2022), returning abortion regulation to the states; abortion remains legal in Maryland and is not subject to criminal prosecution.

== Medication Abortion ==
Medication abortion is legal in Maryland, both through an in-person appointment and through telehealth services. Under the Maryland Abortion Care Access Act Of 2022, medication abortion must be fully covered by private and public insurers such as Medicaid. In June 2024, the Supreme Court upheld the right to access the medication abortion pill, mifepristone. Prior to this decision, Governor Wes Moore had announced in 2023 that the Maryland Department of Health would work with the University of Maryland Medical Center to secure a two and a half year supply of the medication in case it became unavailable on the market.

== Clinic history ==
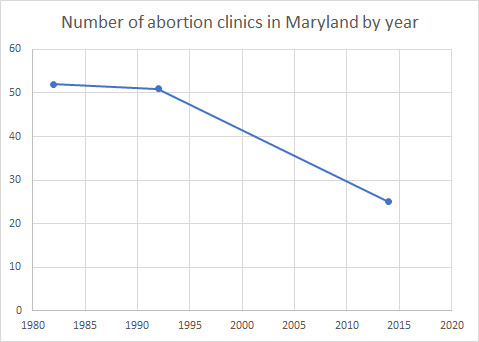
Number of abortion clinics in Maryland by year.

Between 1982 and 1992, the number of abortion clinics in the state decreased by one, going from 52 in 1982 to 51 in 1992.

Maryland had 25 abortion clinics and 19 other facilities that provide abortions as of 2017. In that same year, 71% of the counties in the state did not have an abortion clinic and 29% of women in the state aged 15–44 lived in a county without an abortion clinic.

In 2017, there were nine Planned Parenthood clinics, five of which offered abortion services.

In 2023, the Guttmacher Institute estimated that in 2023 there were a total of 38,590 clinician-provided abortions performed in Maryland, including more than 4,000 for patients who came from out of state.

== Barriers to access ==
Maryland is a state that has highly ranked reproductive rights protections, but there are still barriers to safe and legal abortions. According to the Institute for Women's Policy Research, Maryland is ranked #3 across all fifty states for reproductive rights and received an A− rating.

=== Parental notification ===
In the state of Maryland, minors can obtain safe and legal abortions but a health care professional must provide parental notification to at least one parent or guardian before the abortion can be administered. This parent or guardian does not have to give consent for the procedure, they just must be notified. There are exceptions, including: if the minor is capable of giving their informed consent, if notification would not be in the best interest of the minor, if a reasonable attempt to give notification has been unsuccessful, if notice may lead to abuse towards the minor, or if the minor does not live with her parent or guardian.

The parental notification may be a deterrent for minors to get an abortion. The exceptions leave the decision in the hands of the abortion provider which creates uncertainty for the minors looking to get the procedure and might further be a deterrent. Additionally, the abortion providers might not decide to waive the parental notification for minors who need the procedure, proving the deterrent that this parental notification causes.

=== Facility type and location ===
Maryland had 25 abortion clinics and 19 other facilities that provide abortions as of 2017. However, many clinics do not offer abortions after 24 weeks. Maryland law states that abortions can only be performed after or at viability if there is a fetal anomaly or the patient's life is at risk; rape and incest are not included as an exception after viability.

Clinics that offer safe and legal abortions are concentrated around metropolitan Baltimore and Washington, D.C. As of 2017, over 70% of Maryland counties did not have a clinic or provider that provided abortions. These counties include almost 30% of Maryland women. Abortion-rights groups report patients traveling three hours from counties without clinics to Baltimore for the procedure.

=== Other noticeable legislation ===
Maryland has 38 crisis pregnancy centers with counselors working to convince pregnant patients away from abortions. In 2009, Baltimore City passed legislation to require crisis pregnancy centers (CPCs) to disclose their status and that they did not offer abortion services, but organizations representing the CPCs have been successful in courts challenging these laws, principally on the argument that forcing the CPCs to post such language violated their First Amendment rights and constituted compelled speech.

In 2018, a Federal Appeals court struck down a law that would've required Maryland clinics to clearly disclose in their waiting rooms if they do not offer or refer pregnant patients to abortion procedures because it was deemed unconstitutional. This, combined with the existence of the pregnancy centers, show lack of information/counseling as another barrier to abortion access for many people in Maryland.

Federal policies have posed barriers that prevent Maryland patients from pursuing safe and legal abortions. Even before the Trump administration's 2019 restructure of Title X, federal funds could not be used for abortion services. The 2019 Title X regulations, however, also prohibited Title X providers from offering contraceptive services to low-income women if they were co-located with an abortion provider and barred them or referring patients to abortion providers unless they explicitly ask for the referral. Nationally, 4 million people rely on Title X (78% of these patients have incomes below 150% of the poverty level), and Maryland initially pulled out of the Title X network because of the new regulations and gag rule. The Maryland legislature approved emergency funding to mitigate this funding loss, however it is not a long-term solution. The new regulations introduce another barrier because the gag rule limits how much information doctors can provide their patients about all of their choices, including obtaining safe and legal abortions. Baltimore City sued The Trump Administration over the Title X changes. It was granted a permanent injunction against enforcement of the Trump era regulations in September 2020 and as a result the Maryland rejoined the Title X network in October 2020. The Biden Administration issued a new Title X rules that rescinded the 2019 changes by the Trump administration and strengthened access to contraceptive services, including abortion referrals and collocated abortion services. That rule that went into effect in November 2021.

In 2022 the Maryland legislature passed and overrode a veto of a bill designed to expand abortion access within the state by expanding the range of medical professionals authorized to provide abortion care. The bill also funded training programs for physicians, nurse practitioners, midwives, physician assistants, and other “qualified healthcare providers.” In 2023 the Maryland legislature passed and the governor signed a “bundle of legislation” designed to protect Marylanders right and access to abortion, declaring the state as a “safe haven.” The legislative package includes a referendum slated for the 2024 election that would enshrine the fundamental right to abortion in the state constitution. Another bill protected Maryland abortion providers from liability lawsuits for providing out-of-state residents with abortion care, while another bill protects the “medical privacy” of abortion seekers.

== Statistics ==
In 2007, 59% of adults in Maryland said in a poll by the Pew Research Center that abortion should be legal in all or most cases and 33% said it should be illegal in all or most cases; in 2014 support for legal abortion in all or most cases increased to 64% among adults in Maryland while adults saying that abortion should be illegal remained at 33%. A 2021 Goucher College Poll found that 88% of Maryland respondents support legal abortion. 44% support legal abortion in all circumstances, 44% support it under certain circumstances, and 10% think abortion should be illegal.

Reported abortion statistics for the state are hard to ascertain due to inconsistencies in methodology and sporadic reporting to the CDC. Reporting began in 1981 to the Morbidity and Mortality Weekly Report (MMWR) for the years 1979 and 1980. The MMWR did not provide abortion statistics for 1982 or 1983, and then between 1984 and 1989 the MMWR reported national abortion statistics but Maryland was not one of the 37 states included. In 1990 through 1997 Maryland began reporting again, and in 1997 the MMWR also began reporting statistics for Maryland residents who obtain an abortion in any state. In 1998 the state switched methodology and stopped reporting exact numbers for abortions in the state from out-of-state residents (although a rough estimate can be derived because the percentage of out-of-state residents obtaining abortions is available). In 2007 the state joined California and New Hampshire in ending reporting abortion data to the CDC entirely, although for that year the CDC did release the number of Maryland residents obtaining abortions in states that did report. In 2014, the Guttmacher Institute began directly polling the state's clinics and provides data for 2014, 2016, and 2017.

Reported or polled legal abortions in Maryland
Year	Total	Ratio*	Rate**	Percentage of abortions by out-of-state residents
1979	25526	438	25	5%
1980	27778	464	27	5.7%
1981	27855	452	26	5.8%
1990	22425	279	19	6.8%
1991	18994	240	16	4.7%
1992	19860	255	17	7.1%
1993	19318	258	16	7.1%
1994	17627	238	15	6.6%
1995	16204	224	14	8.8%
1996	12363	173	10	5.6%
1997	9869	141	8	4%
1998	10458†	145	9	4.2%
1999	11164†	155	9	4.1%
2000	12337†	166	10	6.7%
2001	13502†	184	11	5.9%
2002	13595†	185	11	14.3%
2003	11485†	153	10	18.8%
2004	10096†	135	8	12.6%
2005	10797†	144	9	14.7%
2006	9530†	123	7.9	14.3%
2014	28140§		23.4	
2016	30190§		25.3	
2017	29800§		25	
* Ratio is per 1000 live births. ** Rate is per 1000 women aged 15–44. † 1998-2007 Only includes abortions from Maryland residents that took place in Maryland. § State did not report, but the Guttmacher Institute directly polled all clinics in the state for 2014, 2016, and 2017.

Reported legal abortions obtained by Maryland residents in any state
Year	Total	Ratio*	Rate**
1997	13764	196	12
1998	15052	209	13
1999	15557	216	13
2000	15347	207	13
2001	16397	224	14
2002	15064	206	13
2003	12419	166	10
2004	10604	142	9
2005	10875	145	9
2006	10152	8.5	131
2007	2027†	†	†
* Ratio is per 1000 live births. ** Rate is per 1000 women aged 15–44. † In 2007 state did not report, numbers are available only from other states where residents obtained abortions. Meaningful figures cannot be presented.

== Abortion financing ==
The Hyde Amendment prohibits the use of federal funds for abortion, except in cases of life endangerment, rape or incest. Seventeen states, including Maryland, use their own funds to cover a broader category of "medically necessary" abortions sought by people who receive public Medicaid health insurance. In 2010, the state had 4,352 publicly funded abortions, of which zero were federally funded and 4,352 were state funded.

On January 19, 2023, on Governor Wes Moore's first day of office, he fulfilled a campaign promise to release $3.5 million in funds for abortion training, previously withheld by the former Republican governor.

Abortion funds operate across the country to fill in gaps left by inadequate governmental and personal funding for abortion seekers — there are several funds specifically dedicated to funding abortions in Maryland. They are financed by individual donors, private foundations, and state and local grants.

== Abortion rights views and activities ==
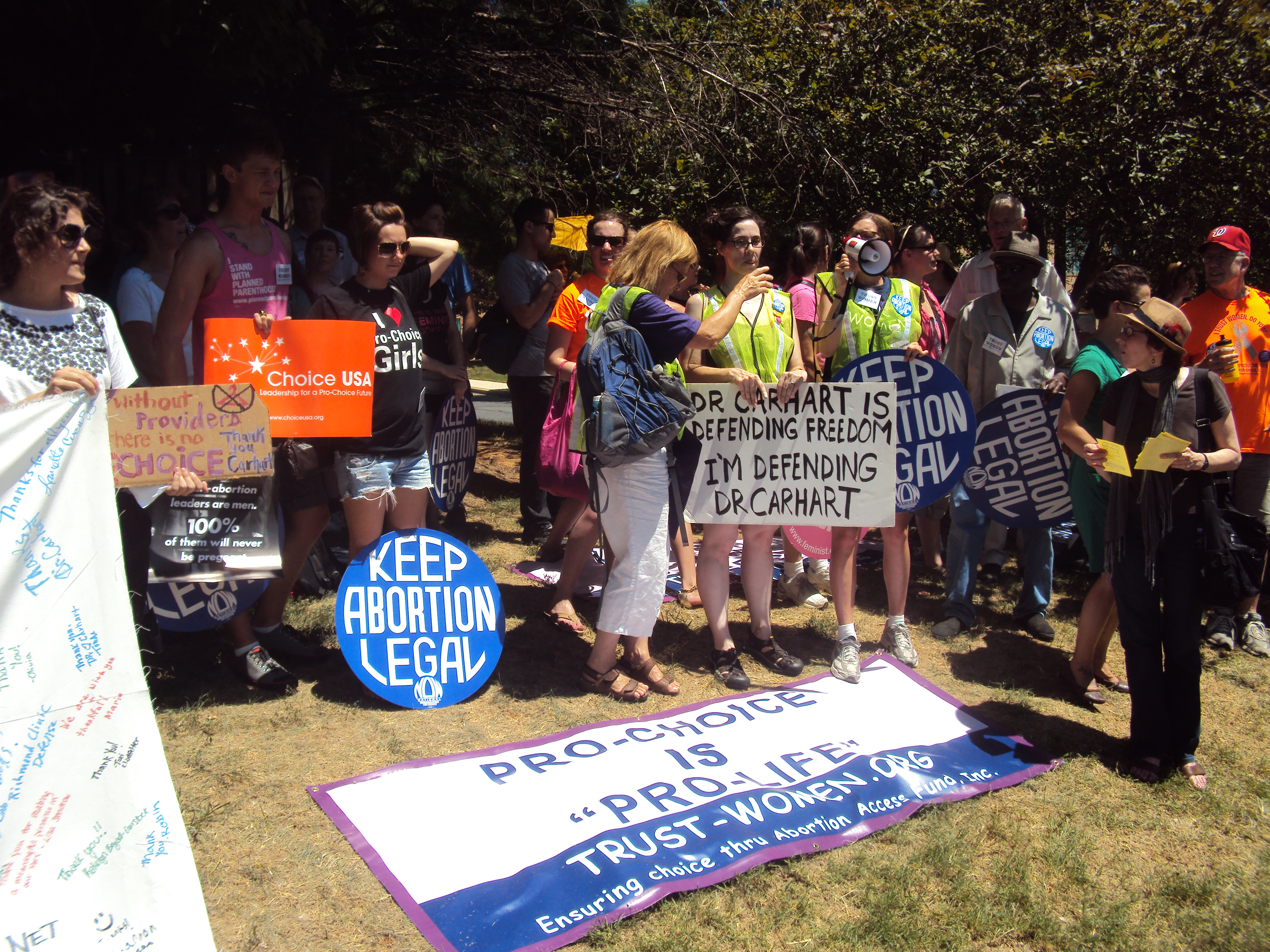
Pro-choice is "pro-life" at Summer of Choice 2011 in Germantown, Maryland

=== Activism ===
Pro-Choice Maryland (formerly NARAL Pro-Choice Maryland) is an organization that advocates for abortion rights in the state.

There are several abortion funds specifically dedicated to funding abortions in the state of Maryland.

=== Protests ===
People from the state participated in marches supporting abortion rights as part of a #StoptheBans movement in May 2019.

Direct action protests include the vandalizing of the Alpha Pregnancy Center in Reisterstown, Maryland on May 13, 2022, by Jane's Revenge, the far-left abortion rights group that has targeted pregnancy crisis centers as well as a church and a Congressional office. Among other graffiti, they wrote "If abortions aren't safe, neither are you." Around May 14, 2022, the BirthRight crisis pregnancy center in Frederick, Maryland was vandalized with abortion rights graffiti.

Following the overturn of Roe v. Wade on June 24, 2022, abortion rights protests were held in Annapolis and Baltimore.

In Chevy Chase, Maryland on January 22, 2023, abortion rights protesters rallied outside of Brett Kavanaugh's home after a documentary investigating his sexual assault allegations premiered at the Sundance Film Festival.

== Anti-abortion views and activities ==
=== Violence ===
On July 7, 1984, eight weeks after a bomb threat to Planned Parenthood's state headquarters in Baltimore, MD the Annapolis Planned Parenthood office in Annapolis Maryland was bombed causing extensive damage. While no injuries were reported, there were broken windows, a hole opened in the front of the building and structural damage to the ceiling. The federal Bureau of Alcohol, Tobacco and Firearms investigated the possible connection to a July 4 explosion at the National Abortion Federation offices in Washington DC.

In January 1985 three men from Maryland; Thomas Eugene Spinks, Kenneth William Shields and Michael D. Bray were charged in connection with the bombing of the National Abortion Federation, and the bombing of Planned Parenthood of Maryland in Annapolis as well as six other Maryland, D.C, and Virginia area bombings; the bombings of the Hillcrest Clinic in Norfolk, Va., the Metropolitan Medical Women's Center in Rockville, Md., the Randolph Medical Center in Wheaton, Md., the Metropolitan Family Planning Institute in Suitland, Md.; and the New Year's Day bombing of the Hillcrest Women's Surgi- Center in Washington D.C. All three men were found guilty; Shields sentenced to two years in prison, Bray ten years, and Spinks, considered the principal instigator, 15 years.

=== Protests and assemblies ===
From February 24–25, 2016, Travis Reynolds, 21, vandalized a Baltimore-area women's health care clinic with anti-abortion graffiti. After being arrested, Reynolds "admitted to police that he defaced the clinic's doors, walls and windows because he thought that it would deter women from using the clinic." Reynolds pleaded guilty in federal court to one count of violating the Freedom of Access to Clinic Entrances Act in October 2016.

The anti-abortion group 40 Days for Life conducts seasonal prayer campaigns outside abortion facilities in various Maryland cities. Individuals and groups sign up with 40 Days for Life to be present outside specific facilities for specific hours to pray for an end to abortion during each seasonal campaign. Since the late 1970s, the anti-abortion group Maryland March for Life has hosted a yearly march to the Maryland State House in Annapolis to protest abortion rights in the state.
