= Evening Dispensary For Working Women and Girls =

Defunct health care service

The Evening Dispensary for Working Women and Girls was an innovative American health care service at the turn of the twentieth century. As a public dispensary, it provided "outpatient medical treatment and advice to patients, in contrast to the inpatient service provided by hospitals". It offered medical treatment for poor women, educated the public on health matters, and provided female medical students with an opportunity to learn and gain experience.

== History ==
Opened on March 1, 1891, and closed on March 1, 1910, the Dispensary was founded by two Woman's Medical College of Pennsylvania graduates, Kate Campbell Hurd-Mead, M.D. and Alice Hall, M.D. The two came to Baltimore and connected with the organization who petitioned Johns Hopkins Hospital and gained the interest of other individuals in Baltimore to open the clinic. During its existence, it had the same board of managers consisting of Alice T. Hall, Kate Campbell Hurd (Mead), Elizabeth T. King, Julia Rebecca Rogers, Bertha M. Smith, and Kate M. McLane, Anne Galbraith Carey, Dr. Lillian Welsh, M.D.. Their staff included Lilian Welsh, Mary Sherwood, Florence Sabin, and Elizabeth Hurdon, all devoted their time to practice medicine and help patients. Women physicians during this time lacked the opportunities necessary for their field, and the dispensary also provided lectures, medical training, and opportunities to women of higher education seeking post-graduate experience. The free care was offered to the poor and needy, it established clean milk distribution for sick babies, the first visiting nurse and public bath, a social service department, provided a study of midwives and birth registration in Baltimore, as well as a study of tuberculosis. Women now had the opportunity to find care from doctors of the same sex.

== Founders ==
Lilian Welsh was a board member of the dispensary. She was born in 1858 in Pennsylvania. In 1889, at the age of 31, she received her medical degree from the Women's Medical College. To continue her medical training, she set off to Switzerland. There, she became acquainted with Mary Sherwood, who later recruited Dr. Welsh to become a part of the faculty at Goucher College, formerly known as Women's College of Baltimore. At Goucher College, she taught physiology and hygiene. Throughout her career, she was a leader for public health initiatives, an advocate for women's rights, and worked to persuade medical schools in the surrounding areas to accept women into their medical schools.

Julia Rebecca Rogers was one of the many women involved in establishing the Evening Dispensary for Working Women and Girls. In 1898, she also helped found the Baltimore Association for Promoting the University Education of Women. Julia Rebecca Rogers was also one of the women working towards persuading medical schools in the area to accept female students. Julia Rebecca Rogers and Dr. Lillian Welsh were personal friends. Julia Rebecca Rogers became acquainted with Goucher College through Dr. Lillian Welsh. Alongside the former First Lady Lou Hoover, she worked as an honorary chairman of the Citizen's Committee of the Goucher College Building Fund. In 1994, Julia Rebecca Rogers left Goucher College her estate which facilitated the expansion of the college's campus.

Kate Campbell Hurd-Mead was born in 1867 in Quebec, Canada. Her interest in medicine was stimulated by her father who was a doctor and Dr. Mary Putnam Jacobi. Dr. Kate Campbell Hurd-Mead was a strong advocate for women's rights, in particular in the medical field. She helped establish the dispensary and was also a part of the first institution to hire women physicians. Dr. Kate Campbell Hurd-Mead obtained her medical degree from the Women's Medical College of Pennsylvania in 1885. Afterwards, she spent a year in Boston, Massachusetts as an intern at Boston's New England Hospital for Women and Children. It was there where she met Dr. Marie Zakrzewska. Dr. Kate Campbell Hurd-Mead help many leadership positions and roles throughout her career. Dr. Kate Campbell Hurd-Mead oversaw the preventative health program at Bryn Mawr School for Girls. Dr. Kate Campbell Hurd-Mead was also a part of the team that incorporated Middlesex County Hospital. Her primary medical interests revolved around public health and gynecology. She obtained her training as a gynecologist in Vienna which led to her practicing gynecology in Connecticut in 1907. After 12 years of practicing as a gynecologist, Dr. Kate Campbell Hurd-Mead retired in 1925. Even after her retirement, she was actively dedicated to the women's rights movement. She continued doing research on women's health and continued to write the history of women in the medical field and medicine. She completed two volumes of the entire history of women in medicine up to the nineteenth century. She died in 1941, before she could finish the third volume.

== See also ==
- Baltimore General Dispensary
- List of public dispensaries
