= Sidney Sherwood =

American economist (1860–1901)

- Born: May 28, 1860; Ballston, New York, US
- Died: August 5, 1901 (aged 41); Ballston, New York, US

Academic background
- Education: Johns Hopkins University; Columbia Law School; Princeton University
- Doctoral advisor: Richard T. Ely

Academic work
- School or tradition: Marginalism
- Institutions: Johns Hopkins University
- Doctoral students: George E. Barnett

Sidney Sherwood (May 28, 1860 – August 5, 1901) was an American economist.

== Career ==
Sidney Sherwood was born on March 28, 1860, in Ballston Spa, New York – one of six (two males, 4 females) – to Thomas Burr Sherwood (1816–1883), a lawyer and farmer, and Mary Frances Beattie (maiden; 1822–1903). Sherwood earned his Ph.D. from Johns Hopkins University in June 1891, where, in 1892, he succeeded Richard Theodore Ely (1854–1943) as Chair of Political Economy at Johns Hopkins. Ely, that same year, left for the University of Wisconsin–Madison to become head of the political economy program. Though a student of Ely, Sherwood was one of the early American marginalists. (Note: Sherwood was one of the early American economists influenced by marginalism, the theory that economic value and decision-making are shaped by the utility, cost, or productivity of an additional unit at the margin – analyzing value and choice in terms of incremental, or marginal, changes.) Sherwood served as Chair at Johns Hopkins until his death August 5, 1901, at Ballston Center, at his mother's home, age 41. He died of blood poisoning from an infection following an accidental cut to his right hand July 26, 1901, while trimming a tree during a vacation on a farm in Ballston.

Sherwood, earlier, from 1884 to 1885, studied law at Columbia University and practiced law in New York three years after as a partner with Abner Charles Thomas (1844–1911). Before that, in 1879, Sherwood earned his bachelor's degree from Princeton. He began his doctorate studies in politics and history at Johns Hopkins in 1888, where he studied economics under Professor Richard T. Ely, and History under Professor Herbert Baxter Adams (1850–1901).

1891–1892: Instructor Finance – University of Pennsylvania
1892–1895: Associate in Economics – Johns Hopkins University
1895–1901: Associate Professor Economics – Johns Hopkins University

== Family ==
One of his older sisters, Mary Sherwood, MD (1856–1935), was an influential physician, educator, and spokesperson for preventive medicine, public health, women's health, childcare. A younger sister, Margaret Pollock Sherwood (1864–1955), was an English professor at Wellesley College.

== Works ==
- University Extension Lectures. Series A, no. 24. The American Society for the Extension of University Teaching. Philadelphia: Bankers of Philadelphia & Wharton School. LCCN ca08-134 (serial); OCLC 70291249 (all editions) (article).
1. Sherwood, Sidney (1891). "Syllabus of a Course of Twelve Lectures on the History and Theory of Money".
  1. HathiTrust (University of Wisconsin–Madison).
  2. Internet Archive (Cal Berkeley).
- Sidney Sherwood (1893). The History and Theory of Money. J.B. Lippincott. ISBN 978-1-0223-7255-9 – via Google Books (Penn State). LCCN 06-3441; OCLC 3829859 (all editions).
- Sidney Sherwood (1897). Tendencies in American Economic Thought. Johns Hopkins Press – via Google Books (Harvard). LCCN 04-7760; OCLC 1846710 (all editions).
- Sherwood, Sidney (June 1891). University of the State of New York – Origin, History and Present Organization (PhD dissertation). Johns Hopkins University.
1. Reprint → Regents Bulletin, No. 11. State University of New York. January 1893. pp. 201–301. OCLC 1547531477 (all editions).
  1. Via Internet Archive (Cal Berkeley).
  2. Via Google Books (Michigan).
  3. Via Google Books (Cal Berkeley).
2. Inscribed on the title page: "Accepted by the Johns Hopkins University as a Thesis for the degree of Doctor of Philosophy, June 1891."
3. Reprint → Adams, Herbert B[axter] (1850–1901) (ed.). Circular of Information. No. 3, 1900. Series: Contributions to American Educational History. Vol. 28. Washington: U.S. Bureau of Education, Government Printing Office. pp. 31–131. LCCN 01-21013; OCLC 3123002 (all editions).
  1. HathiTrust (University of Illinois Urbana-Champaign).

== Bibliography ==
=== References ===
- History of Economic Thought. "Sidney Sherwood, 1860–1901". New York: The History of Economic Thought, a blog maintained by Gonçalo L. Fonseca of the Institute for New Economic Thinking. Archived from the original on November 28, 2016.
- Johns Hopkins University Circulars (December 1901). "Sidney Sherwood" (obituary). Vol. 21, no. 154. p. 9 – via Google Books (Michigan). LCCN sn79-470.
- New-York Tribune (March 24, 1892). Personal. Vol. 51, whole no. 16566. p. 6 (colum 6) – via Newspapers.com.
- "Personal Notes": "Johns Hopkins University". The Annals (obituary). 18. American Academy of Political and Social Science: 105–107 (pp. 495–197. November 1901. JSTOR 1010203.
