= Elizabeth Hurdon =

British gynecologist and pathologist

- Born: 28 January 1868; Bodmin, Cornwall
- Died: 29 January 1941 (aged 73); Exeter, Devon
- Occupation: gynecological pathologist

Elizabeth Hurdon CBE (28 January 1868 – 29 January 1941) was a British gynecologist and pathologist, considered the first gynecological pathologist.

== Early life and education ==
Hurdon was born in Bodmin, Cornwall to John and Ann (Coom) Hurdon, one of three daughters. The family emigrated to Canada when she was young. She enrolled in Wesleyan Ladies College in Hamilton, Ontario at the age of 13, graduating five years later with a Mistress of English Literature degree. In 1892 she enrolled in the Women's Medical College affiliate of Trinity College at the University of Toronto and received her M.D in 1895.

== Career ==
Hurdon was hired in by JHU in 1897 as an assistant gynecologist. She was the first woman in the professional staff of Johns Hopkins Hospital and the faculty of Johns Hopkins University School of Medicine (JHU). There she studied under William Osler, taught, and conducted research and it's unknown if she performed surgeries, despite her surgical medical training. With co-author Howard Kelly she published the first thorough look at the pathology of the appendix, The Vermiform Appendix and Its Diseases, in 1905. The book has been called "a monumental book on the appendix, likely never to be equalled."

She also had her own private practice in Baltimore, Maryland and served on the board of the Evening Dispensary For Working Women and Girls. In 1916 she took a leave of absence from Johns Hopkins and joined the British Royal Army Medical Corps. She was one of 82 women physicians in the Women's Medical Unit, treating casualties from Gallipoli. She worked as a Civilian Surgeon attached to the RAMC. She resigned from that position in 1919.

Hurdon wound up staying in Europe after World War I and served as Director of Research for the Cancer Research Committee looking into the effects of radium therapy on uterine cancer. Along with Dr. Helen Chambers, she traveled with radium to four women's hospitals in order to treat cervical cancer, considered "one of the first multi-institutional clinical trials in radiotherapy." She toured centers for radium therapy in the United States and Europe collecting information on treatment practices.

She was appointed first director of Medical Research and Service at the newly formed Marie Curie Hospital in London in 1929. This hospital, with 30 public and private beds, was formed for the purpose of continuing research on the effectiveness of radium therapy, with inpatient and outpatient departments. In addition to being supported by wealthy donors, it also received support from prominent feminists of the time, campaigning for improvements to women's welfare where radiotherapy was seen as more compassionate care for cancer.

While at the Curie Hospital, her research took her into gynecological pathology and using radiation therapy for treatment of gynecological malignancies. She wrote Cancer of the Uterus, the first book devoted to the treatment of uterine cancer, published posthumously in 1942. She received the Order of Commander of the British Empire on 9 June 1938 and retired from practice in 1939. She died at her home in Exeter in January 1941.
