= Lilian Welsh =

Physician, educator, suffragist and advocate

- Born: March 6, 1858; Columbia, Pennsylvania, U.S.
- Died: February 23, 1938 (aged 79)
- Education: State Normal School (BA); Woman's Medical College of Pennsylvania (MD)
- Occupations: Physician, educator, suffragist
- Employer: Evening Dispensary For Working Women and Girls
- Partner: Mary Sherwood
- Honours: Maryland Women's Hall of Fame
Lilian Welsh

Lilian Welsh (March 6, 1858 – February 23, 1938) was an American physician, educator, suffragist, and advocate for women's health. She was on the faculty at Woman's College of Baltimore and an active member of National American Woman Suffrage Association. Welsh was posthumously inducted into the Maryland Women's Hall of Fame in 2017.

== Early life and education ==
Welsh was born in Columbia, Pennsylvania, on March 6, 1858, to Annie Eunice (née Young) of Wrightsville and Thomas Welsh of Columbia. She was the fourth child and daughter in her family. Her father had served in the Mexican–American War before becoming a merchant and canalboat owner. He later rejoined the United States Army after the Battle of Fort Sumter to serve in the American Civil War. He eventually rose to the rank of brigadier general in 1863 before dying later that year of an illness during the Siege of Vicksburg.

In 1873, Welsh graduated from Columbia High School. She graduated from Millersville State Normal School in 1875. Upon completing her undergraduate degree, Welsh returned to Columbia High School, where she worked as the principal for five years before entering the Woman's Medical College of Pennsylvania in 1886. She earned a Doctor of Medicine in 1889. Welsh originally intended to become a physiological chemistry teacher, and attended University of Zurich from 1889 to 1890 to prepare for this. In Zurich, she took the university's first course on bacteriology with her friend Mary Sherwood.

== Career in medicine and health advocacy ==
Welsh never found a teaching position, and later became a physician at Norristown State Hospital in 1890. Two years later, Welsh joined Sherwood, to establish a private practice in Baltimore, Maryland. Welsh and Sherwood were both interested in "preventive medicine and the health of expectant mothers and babies." They encountered gender discrimination and eventually closed their private practice.

Welsh reflected in 1927:

“Most people still prefer men physicians to women in practically all lines. The women who have the largest general practice have settled, for the most part, in sections where live those who are not especially well off financially and where there are large foreign populations. In those communities which are popularly supposed to be inhabited by the more enlightened, the prejudice is all in favor of the masculine physician, no matter what may be the skill of the women."

She added:

“The most bitter critics of women as doctors and nurses were women more often than men…the conviction was deep rooted and widespread that women by nature were incapacitated for intellectual pursuits and any calling required education, knowledge and special skill were outside woman’s sphere.”

In 1894, Welsh joined the faculty at Woman's College of Baltimore, later known as Goucher College, and served as the physician to students and as a professor of physiology and hygiene. She taught courses to women in personal and public health and physical exercise. Welsh was known at the college as an outspoken advocate of women's health and hygiene. For several years, she was the only female Full Professor. Welsh associated with Goucher College for thirty years.

Welsh and Sherwood later were in charge of the Evening Dispensary For Working Women and Girls that was founded by Alice Hall and Kate Campbell Hurd-Mead. They directed the dispensary until its closure in 1910. In 1897, Welsh became the secretary of the Baltimore Association for the Promotion of the University Education of Women which advocated for women be accepted into the graduate school at Johns Hopkins University. This eventually occurred in 1908.

Around the turn of the century, Welsh was on a commission to fight tuberculosis was "at the forefront" of the Children's Welfare Movement.

== Suffrage advocacy and civic involvement ==
Welsh was an active member of the National American Woman Suffrage Association, participating in many street parades and she helped prepare the 1906 convention. She collaborated with Mary Garrett, Mary Sherwood, and Susan B. Anthony on the "College Evening" event. Welsh facilitated 100 Goucher students and suffragists to attend the Woman suffrage parade of 1913.

Welsh was also a member of the Arundell Club and the Arundell Good Government Club.

== Personal life ==
Welsh never married. In 1935, she returned to her family's home in Columbia, Pennsylvania, after the death of Mary Sherwood, her long-time companion and life partner. Welsh died of encephalitis lethargica on February 23, 1938.

== Honors ==
Welsh was posthumously inducted into the Maryland Women's Hall of Fame in 2017.

== Selected works ==
=== Articles ===
- Welsh, Lilian (March 26, 1916). "Women in Medicine". The Baltimore Sun.
- Welsh, Lilian (1916). The Significance of Goucher College for Medicine. Baltimore, MD: Goucher College. OCLC 80277045.

=== Books ===
- Welsh, Lilian (1923). Fifty Years of Women's Education in The United States. Baltimore. OCLC 80050825.
- Welsh, Lilian (1925). Reminiscences of Thirty Years in Baltimore. Baltimore: The Norman, Remington Company. OCLC 2370045.

== See also ==
- Women in medicine
- LGBT people in science
- List of suffragists and suffragettes
