= George E. Barnett =

American economist

- Born: February 19, 1873; Cambridge, Maryland, US
- Died: June 17, 1938 (aged 65); Baltimore, Maryland

Academic background
- Education: Johns Hopkins University; Randolph-Macon College
- Doctoral advisor: Sidney Sherwood

George Ernest Barnett (February 19, 1873 – June 17, 1938) was an American economist. He was a professor of economics at Johns Hopkins University from 1911 to 1938. In 1932, he served as president of the American Economic Association.

== Biography ==
George was born on February 19, 1873, in Cambridge, Maryland to Edward and Elizabeth (Meredith) Barnett.

He received a Bachelor of Arts degree from Randolph-Macon College in 1891 and a doctorate in philosophy from Johns Hopkins University in 1902.

He began his teaching career in 1901 as a lecturer, then as assistant professor, associate professor of political economy until 1911, and from 1911 as full professor in the Department of Statistical Science at Johns Hopkins University.

In 1909 he served on the study group of the National Monetary Commission, and in 1913 he chaired the study group of the U.S. Labor Relations Commission. He served on the advisory committee of the U.S. Census. In 1937 he was selected by the Carnegie Corporation to investigate labor courts in Australia. Barnett was a member and then president of the American Economic Association in 1932, a member of the American Statistical Association, and a member of the American Labor Law Association.
