= Warwick Lane dispensary =

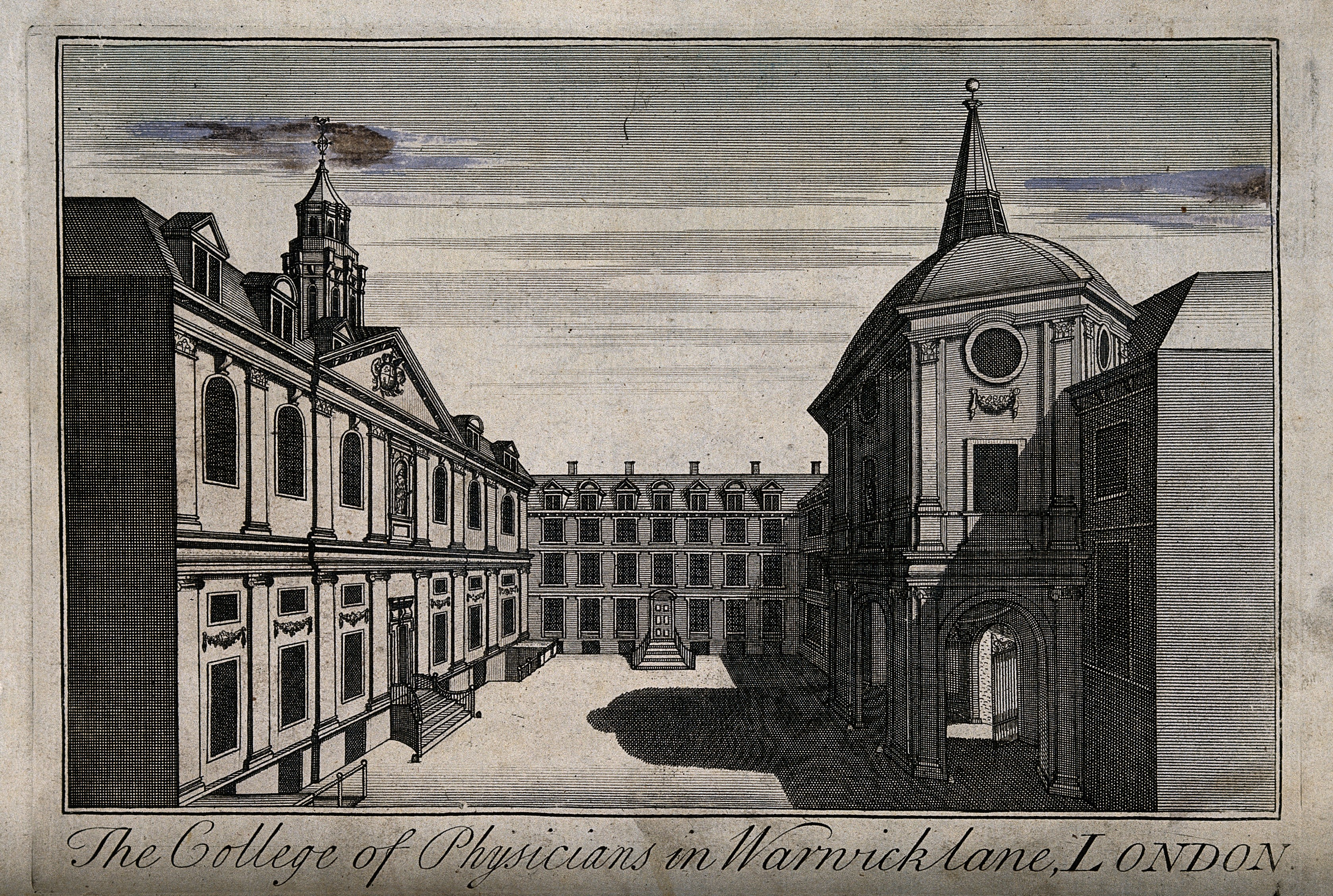
Royal College of Physicians, Warwick Lane, London; the court Wellcome V0013106

The Warwick Lane dispensary, also known as the London Dispensary for the Sick Poor, was a dispensary planned by the Royal College of Physicians in 1688 and opened in 1698 within the College's laboratory in Warwick Lane. Medical advice and medications were given free of charge to the poor. Following the Rose case and opposition from apothecaries, it eventually closed in 1725.
