= Ramakrishna Mission Ashrama, Kanpur =

Hindu ashram in Kanpur, India

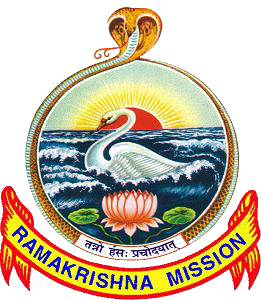
- Emblem
- Established: 1931
- Founder: Shri. Nepaleshwar Banerjee later Swami Nityananda
- Headquarters: Kanpur
- Coordinates: 26.468756°N 80.318632°E
- Official language: Hindi
- Seceratory: Swami Atmashraddhananda
- Website: www.rkmkanpur.org

Ramakrishna Mission Ashrama is the Kanpur branch of the Ramakrishna Mission. The Ashram runs a charitable hospital, a senior secondary boys' high school and a library beside other charitable works.

== History ==
The founder of Kanpur, "Ramakrishna Seva Sadan" (now known as Ram Krishna mission Ashram) was Nepal Maharaj, known as Nepalda alias "Master Moshai". His family name was Shri. Nepaleshwar Banerjee. He settled in Kanpur along with his two younger brothers, Gangadhar Banerjee, an architect and civil engineer, known as Gangada, and the youngest brother, Shri Khagendra Nath Banerjee, a technocrat, known as Khagen Babu, at a stone throw distance to the R.K. Mission ashram at R.K. Nagar Kanpur. Gangadhar Babu constructed their residential house at 110/204, G.T. Road, R.K. Nagar.

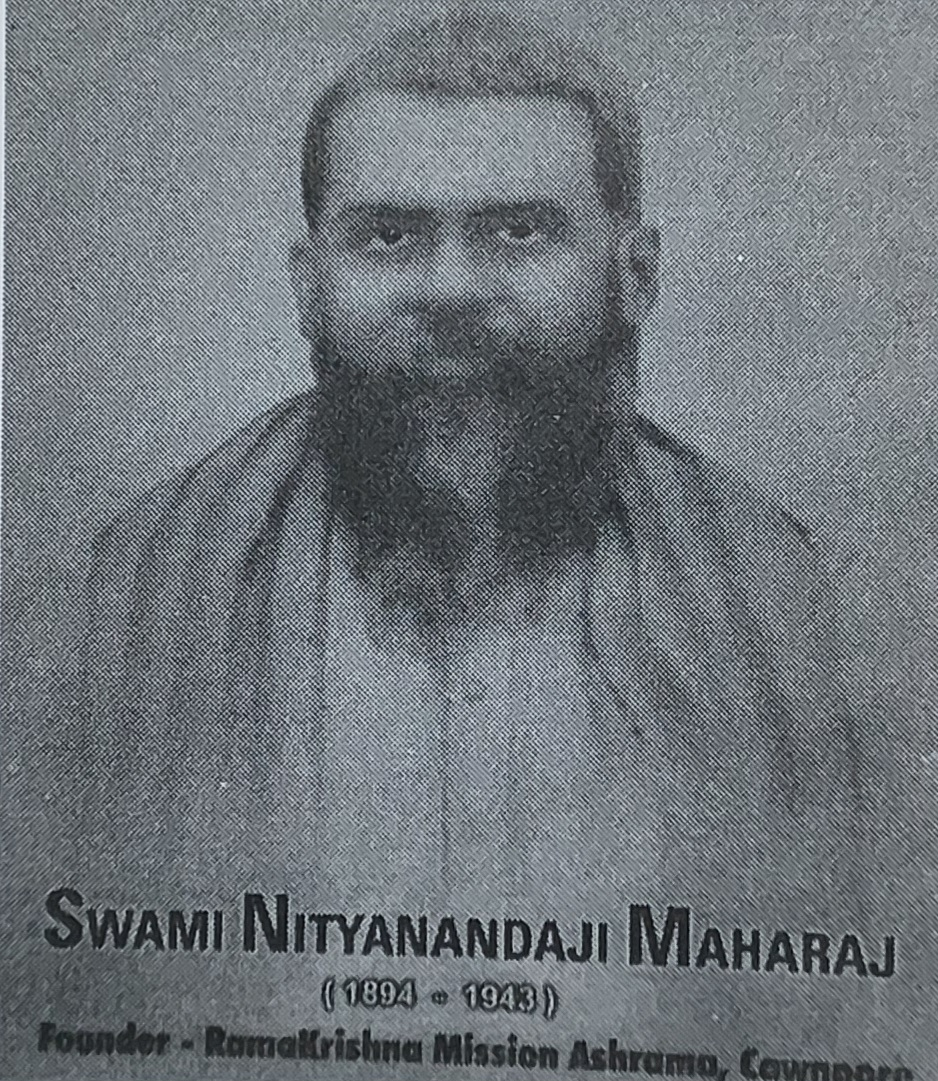
Swami Nityananda (Nepaleshwar Banerjee)

Nepal Maharaj was an initiated disciple of Holy Mother Shri Sarada Devi, got his Mantra Diksha from her in 1918 at Varanasi. Nepal Maharaja was the founder of Kanpur Ram Krishna Seva Sadan, and founding Secretary of the Kanpur Ram Krishna mission. Around 1920-21 Nepaleshwar Banerjee attracted local youth through his personality and knowledge and together they formed a group and started doing physical exercises, meditation, prayer and study of literature of Swami Vivekananda, Sister Nivedita, Subhash Chandra Bose etc. This was the informal beginning of Ramakrishna Sewa Sadan. The initial program of Sewa Sadan included celebration of Shri Ramakrishna's appearance day, daily morning and evening prayer and singing of bhajan. Gradually Nepaleshwar started a hostel for students, an Indian gymnasium (akhara), a primary school and a homeopathic clinic that later on added an allopathic clinic when a few local allopathic doctors desired to offer their services. By 1924 the activities of Sewa Sadan expanded so much that the need of an advisory committee was felt and it was constituted including prominent personalities and officials of Kanpur.

The school was named Sarada Vidyapeeth and the hostel was named Brahmanand Hostel.

Later on Swea Sadan established a village school in Unnao which was a town at that time.

During this time the Ashram changed its location to several places like Raja Manzil, Karachi Khana, Afeem Kothi, Anwarganj etc. During this time the Swea Sadan was visited by prominent monks of Ramakrishna mission like Swami Abhayanand (Bharat Maharaj), a disciple of Holy Mother and Swami Suddhanand, a disciple of Swami Vivekananda. They spread the message of Shri Ramakrishna and Swami Vivekananda through lectures.

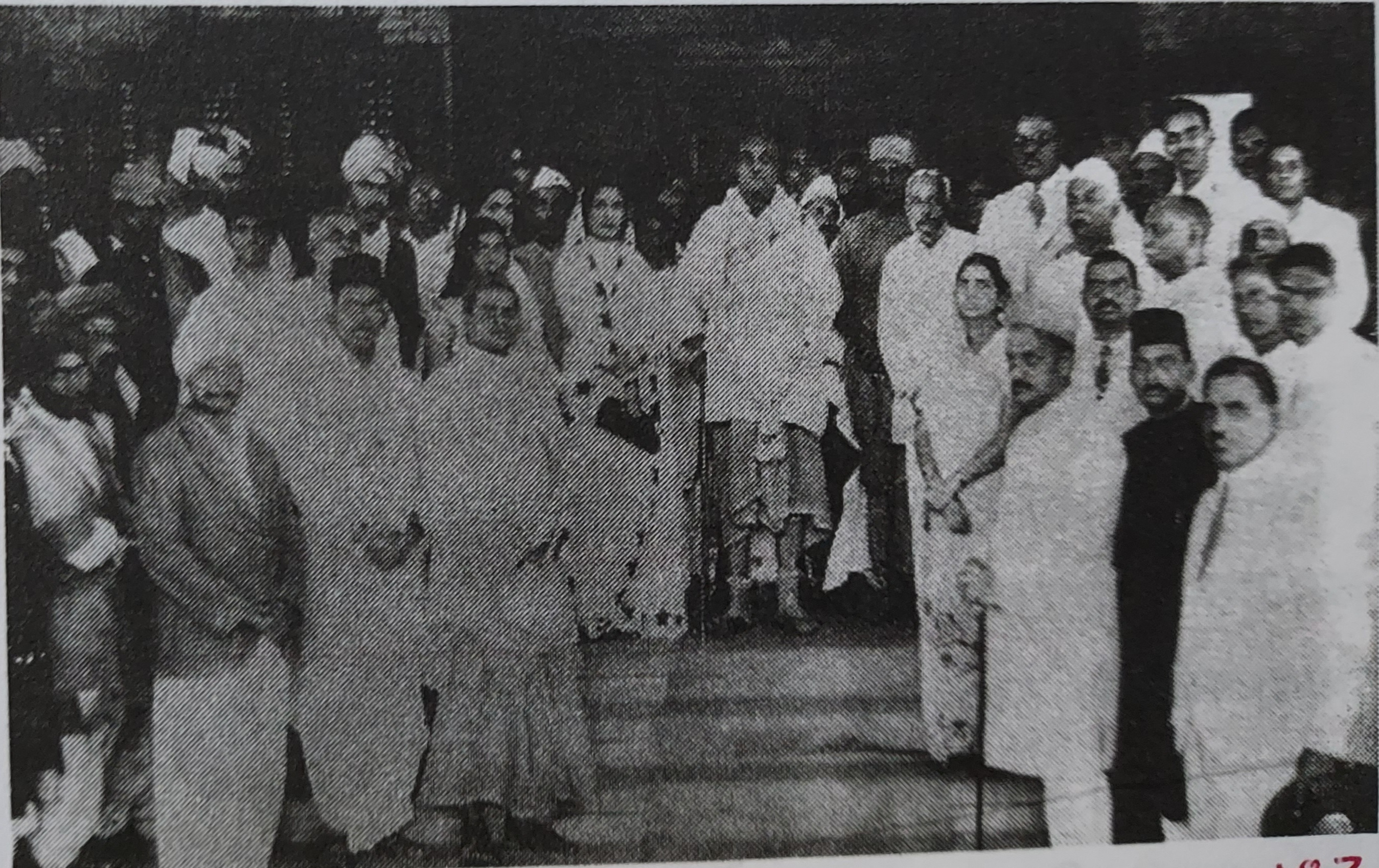
Swami Vijnananda at Kanpur Central Railway Station 1936

On 25 October 1936 Srimat Swami Vijnanananda, a direct disciple of Sri Ramakrishna, first visited the Ashram. He arrived on Kanpur central railway station from Allahabad (now Prayagraj) by Kalka Express train. A group photograph of Swani Vijnananda was taken at the railway station along with members of welcome committee and prominent people of Kanpur City. A copy of this historic group photograph is still present at the office of station master of Kanpur Central Railway station. Swami Vijnananda stayed at the Ashrama which was rented house at the place Agha Kothi. He stayed for six days. On 28 October 1936 Swami Vijnananda put the foundation stone of Ramakrishna Mission Ashram at present location. Coincidentally it was centenary year of Shri Ramakrishna's birth. Initially a temple, monks quarter and hostel was constructed. Swami Vijnananda also provided Mantra Diksha to 8 people during this visit.

On 13 August 1937 the Ashram was inaugurated by Lala Changamal a prominent busbusinessman and a devotee.

A separate building for charitable hospital was inaugurated in 1937 by Prime minister of United Province Pandit Govind Vallabh Pant, which was constructed with the help of Lala Padampat Singhania who donated Rs. 7000 in the memory of his late father Lala Kamlapati Singhania.

Shri Nepaleshwar took his Sanyasa diksha from the then President of Ramakrishna mission Shri Swami Shivananda ji and he was named Swami Nityananda. Swami Nityananda (Nepaleshwar Banerjee) left this mortal body in 1943 at Ramakrishna Mission Sewashrama at Kankhal Haridwar.

In 1965 the ninth president of Ramakrishna Mission Swami Madhavananda laid foundation for library and reading room. Carnatik singer M. S. Subbulakshmi who was Mantra disciple of Swami Ranganathananda collected Rs. 56000 from her shows for the cause. The library was inaugurated by Chandra Bhanu Gupta the chief minister of Uttar Pradesh in 1969.

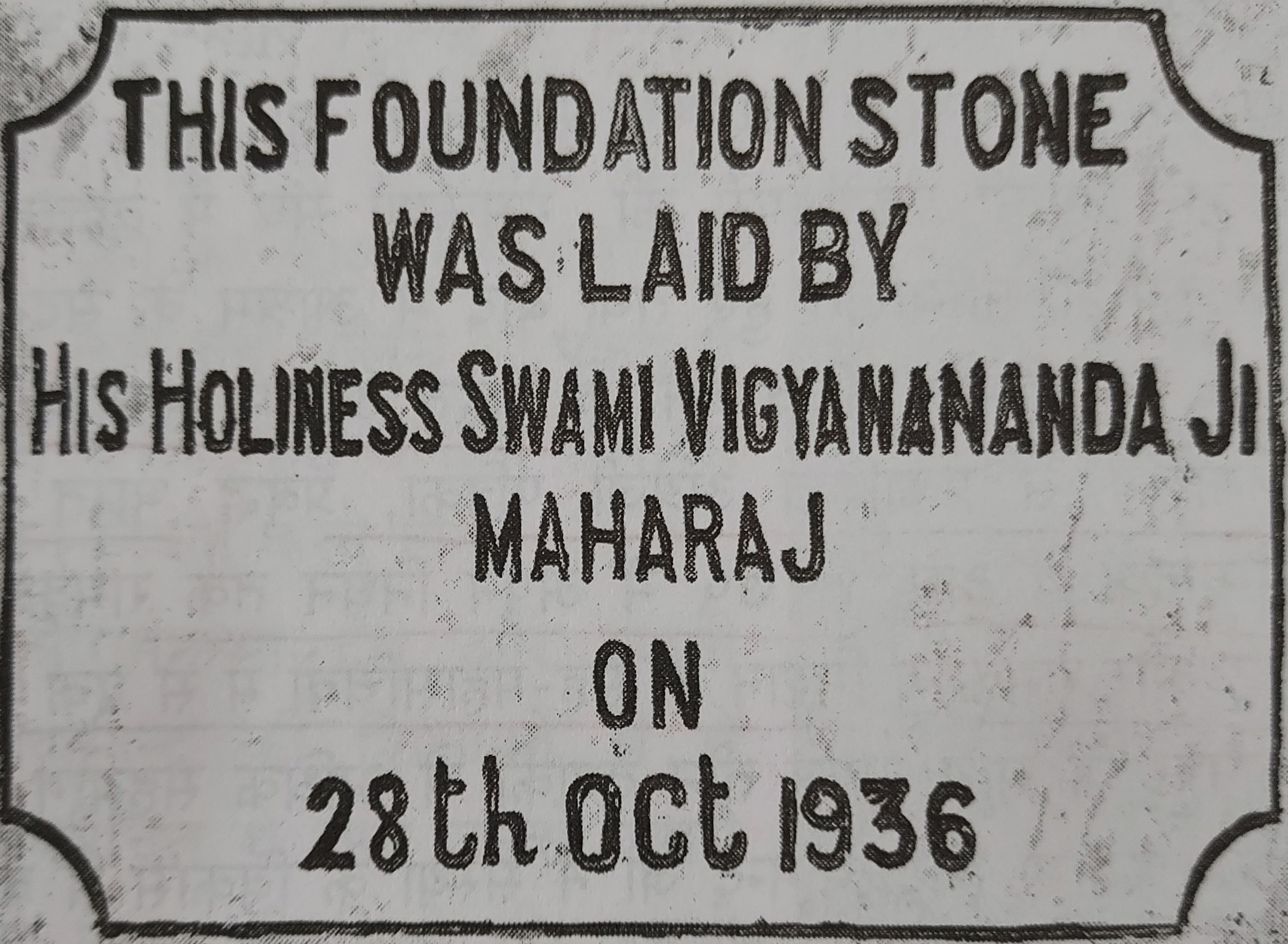
Plaque at Kanpur Ashram

In 1978 the library building was extended into an Auditorium now named Vivekananda auditorium.

== Location ==
The Ashrama was transferred to a new place in Raza Manjil, Ram Narayan Bazar. In 1931, it became affiliated with Belur Math. Due to financial constraints, the Ashrama was shifted first to Anwarganj and then to the present site on 13 August 1937 in Gumti No. 5, on a land measuring 1.5 acres, donated by the Kanpur Improvement Trust. The locality in which Ashrama is situated was later named ‘Ramakrishna Nagar’.

== Activities ==
- Govt. Aided Senior Secondary High School for boys – The Ashrama used to run a school named ‘Vivekananda Vidyapith’ in a small building. In 1947, construction started on a new building just across the main campus, and this became the Ramakrishna Mission School. In 1983–4, the school was designated ‘Best School’ by the Uttar Pradesh State Government. The Senior Secondary High School is affiliated with the U.P. Board and has 800 students. The Ashrama conducts free coaching for the poor in the evening.
- Charitable Medical Dispensary – The Ashrama started a charitable dispensary in a room. It later became known as ‘Baba Ka Hospital, Hospital of the sadhus’. The Ashrama has allopathic and homeopathic sections. It has a physiotherapy unit, pathology laboratory, and x-ray unit that are attached to the dispensary, with general practitioners and specialists operating for free. ECG investigations are carried out by technicians and doctors. A Mobile Medical Unit conducts camps in general health and eye check-up.
- Public library – The library was inaugurated in 1967 by Sri C. B. Gupta, then Chief Minister of Uttar Pradesh. A Reading Room is attached to the library. There are 10 newspapers, 100 periodicals, and 31,400 books, of which 13,500 were on competitive examination in the Textbook section.
- Philanthropic Activities – The Ashrama conducts a free daily-coaching centre for the poor. It also runs a Children Development Centre, which teaches and gives children clothes and study materials. It also conducts relief activities like the free distribution of blankets, clothes, and books. There is a Counseling Centre and Spoken English.
- Vivekananda Samiti at IIT, Kanpur – Started in 1968 by the inspiration of the Ramakrishna Mission in Kanpur, the Vivekananda Samiti at IIT Kanpur has been operating for more than four decades. It is involved in spreading the message of Swami Vivekananda among students.
