= Mary Sherwood =

American physician (1856-1935)

Mary Sherwood (March 31, 1856 – May 24, 1935) was a physician, educator, and spokesperson for preventive medicine, public health, women's health, childcare. She played a vital role in many women's organizations and clubs, as well as contributed to many medical social movements in Maryland and Baltimore.

== Early life ==
Mary Sherwood was born on March 31, 1856, in Ballston Spa, New York, and was one of three children to Thomas Burr Sherwood (1816–1883), a lawyer and farmer, and Mary Frances Beattie (maiden; 1822–1903). Her sister, Margaret Pollock Sherwood became an English professor at Wellesley College and her brother, Sidney Sherwood, became a professor at Johns Hopkins University. She never married or had children, but formed close bonds with her long time friend, Lilian Welsh. She later died at 79 years of age of a coronary occlusion.

== Entrance to medicine ==
She attended the State Normal School in Albany and in 1883, proceeded to Vassar College, where she earned her AB degree. Like her siblings, Sherwood originally pursued a career in education, teaching chemistry, however, she shifted her interest to medicine. She attended the University of Zurich, and in 1890, obtained her medical degree. A year later, she applied but was turned down, from the College of Physicians and Surgeons in New York City. Equipped with recommendation letters from a prominent medical practitioner and educator she studied under at Zurich, she applied to Johns Hopkins Hospital and was offered a spot in Dr. William H. Welch's laboratory, and in Dr. William Osler and Dr. Howard Atwood Kelly's hospital wards. She was not able to hold her residency there, and a few years later, in 1892, she opened her own practice with her close friend Lilian Welsh. The medical practice did not flourish, but the pair decided to stay in Baltimore anyway and eventually took over the Evening Dispensary For Working Women and Girls. During this time, they were in close vicinity to Johns Hopkins Hospital, and had many opportunities to interact, learn, and connect with other doctors, attend lectures, and join groups and organizations. This helped recognize her interest was leading towards preventive medicine, women’s health, and childcare.

== Later life ==
In 1894 Sherwood was appointed as medical director of the girl's preparatory school in Baltimore, the Bryn Mawr School, she also gave lectures on pathology at the Woman’s Medical College in Pennsylvania and traveled to the Bryn Mawr College to give lectures on hygiene and college physician work. Her life was dedicated to the education and health of women and she served many different public health movements and organizations in her time. While employed at the school, she was chosen to help develop and direct, the Bureau of Child Welfare in the city health department in Baltimore, serving as its head until 1924. She was also the first chairman of the obstetrics section in the National Association for the Prevention of Infant Mortality and worked on the Maryland Tuberculosis Commission. Working at the dispensary gave her an introduction and vast knowledge and experience with childbirth and the care of children. She was appointed the chairman of the midwifery committee of the Medical and Chirurgical Faculty part of the Maryland State Medical Society, as well as served membership on the Executive Committee of the Baltimore Babies' Milk Fund Association. Sherwood also played a role in women’s clubs in Baltimore. She was a member of the Baltimore Association for the Promotion of the University Education of Women, advocated for suffrage and was Susan B. Anthony's physician, was a charter member and one of the original board managers of the Arundell Club along with Welsh, as well as the Arundell Good Government Club. During all of her involvements, she served the Bryn Mawr School and held her connections and friendships with Welsh and a few other women doctors.

== Bibliography ==
=== References ===
- Commire, Anne (1939–2012), ed. (1999). Women in World History: A Biographical Encyclopedia (14 Vols.). Deborah Klezmer, assoc. ed.; Barbara Morgan, asst. ed. Waterford, Connecticut: Yorkin Publications. LCCN 99-24692; ISBN 0-7876-3736-X (14 Vol. set); ISBN 978-0-7876-4073-6, 0-7876-4073-5 (Vol. 14).
1. Vol. 14: "Schu–Sui". Strand, Ginger. "Sherwood, Mary (1856–1935)". pp. 264–265 – via Internet Archive.
  1. Online ed. Strand, Ginger. "Sherwood, Mary (1856–1935)". Encyclopedia.com. OCLC 405663034 (all editions), 1013970294.
- Creese, Mary Rose Stewart, PhD (née Weir; 1935–2017) [at Wikidata] (January 1, 2000). Ladies in the Laboratory? American and British Women in Science, 1800–1900: A Survey of Their Contributions to Research. With contributions by Thomas Morton Creese, PhD. Scarecrow Press. LCCN 97-1125; ISBN 978-0-5852-7684-7, 0-5852-7684-6, ISBN 978-0-8108-3287-9, 0-8108-3287-9; OCLC 45733778 (all editions).
1. Part 1: Life Sciences. "From Obstetrics to War Work: American Women" → "Mary Sherwood". pp. 168–169 – via Google Books (limited preview).
- Garraty, John Arthur (1920–2007); Carnes, Mark Christopher (eds.). American National Biography (24 Vols.). Published for American Council of Learned Societies by Oxford University Press. LCCN 98-20826; ISBN 0-1952-0635-5 (set); OCLC 39182280 (all editions).
1. Vol. 19: "Rousseau–Simmons". Ettinger, Laura E[lizabeth], PhD. "Sherwood, Mary". pp. 827–828 – via Internet Archive. ISBN 0-1951-2798-6 (Vol. 19).
- Goucher Alumnae Quarterly. Vol. 13. Goucher College. July 1935. JSTOR community.33178530 (issue); OCLC 28918904 (all editions) (publication), OCLC 10749691894 (issue, July 1935; Vol. 13, no. 4).
1. Sabin, Florence Rena, MD (1871–1953). "Doctor Mary Sherwood" (obituary). pp. 9–13 – via JSTOR. OCLC 779069359 (article).
2. F.P.L. (née Florence Parthenia Lewis; 1877–1964). "Mary Sherwood" (poem). p. 13 – via JSTOR.
- James, Edward T[opping] (1917–2001), ed. (1971). Notable American Women, 1607–1950 – A Biographical Dictionary (3 Vols.). Janet Wilson James (née Janet Wilson; 1918–1987) assoc. ed.; Paul Samuel Boyer (1935–2012), asst. ed. Cambridge: The Belknap Press of Harvard University Press. LCCN 76-152274; ISBN 978-0-6746-2731-4, 0-6746-2731-8, ISBN 978-0-6746-2734-5, 0-6746-2734-2; OCLC 167545 (all editions).
1. Vol. 3: "P–Z". Welter, Barbara Ann (1934–2022). "Sherwood, Mary Elizabeth Wilson". pp. 284–285.
  1. Via Internet Archive (limited preview).
  2. Via Google Books (limited preview).
- Singer, Sandra L. (2003). "Mary Sherwood". Adventures Abroad: North-American Women at German-Speaking Universities: 1868–1915. Westport, Connecticut: Praeger. LCCN 2002-29896; ISBN 978-0-3133-2371-3, 0-3133-2371-2; OCLC 50422923 (all editions).
1. Chapter 2: "Women in Medicine" ("Mary Sherwood"). pp. 29, 35–37.
  1. Via Internet Archive (limited preview).
  2. Via Google Books (limited preview).
