= Margaret Pollock Sherwood =

American literary scholar and writer (1864–1955)

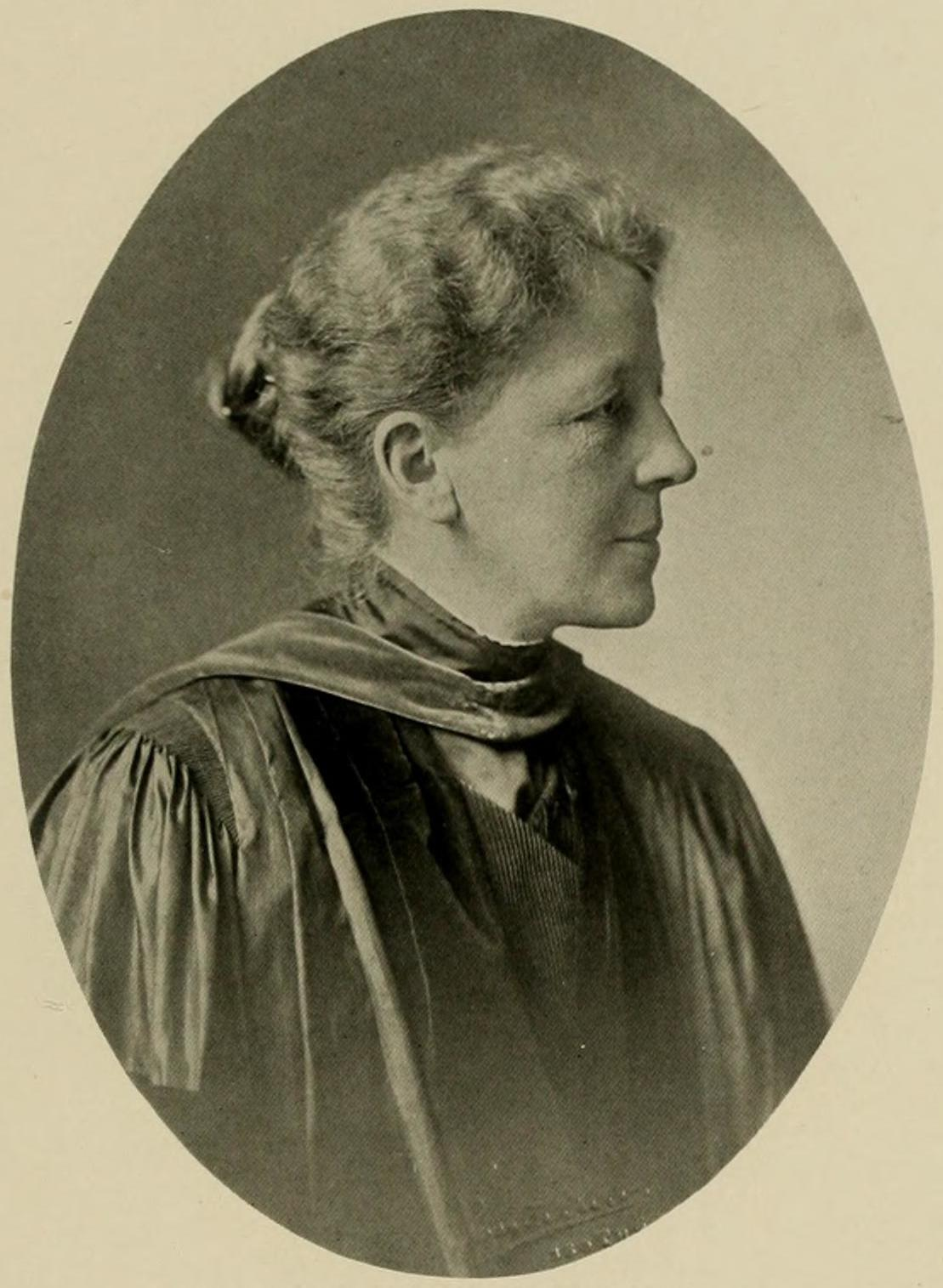
- Sherwood circa 1914
- Born: November 1, 1864 Ballston, New York, U.S.
- Died: September 24, 1955 (aged 90) Newton, Massachusetts, U.S.
- Education: Vassar College; Yale University

Margaret Pollock Sherwood (November 1, 1864 – September 24, 1955) was an American professor of English literature and author of novels, short stories, poetry, and essays.

== Early life and education ==
Margaret Pollock Sherwood, sister of Mary Sherwood, was born on November 1, 1864, in Ballston, New York. She graduated from secondary school at a private boarding school in Newburgh, New York, and from Vassar College in 1886. In 1888, after a semester of study at the University of Zurich, she studied for a semester at the University of Oxford. She taught in Wellesley College's English department from 1889 to 1931, when she retired. In 1898, she received a Ph.D. from Yale University and in 1920 a Doctor of Letters from New York University. For a number of years she sometimes taught part-time at the University Extension of Columbia University.

== Career ==
Her first novel An Experiment in Altruism (1895, Macmillan), published under the pseudonym "Elizabeth Hastings", generated considerable discussion as to the novelist's true identity.

Sherwood, who taught English Romantic poetry at Wellesley, wrote novels broadly designed to promote Christian compassion, but they recognized that individual changes of heart were not enough to bring about social improvements. An Experiment in Altruism (1895) even recounted a woman's traumatic experiment as a twelve-year-old charity volunteer who confronted unspeakable misery but had only gingham aprons to dispense. "Since then, all of the charity work I have heard of has seemed as ironic as that," she concluded, although she did not abandon the work. ...

Her novel Henry Worthington, Idealist (1899, Macmillan) fictionalized a debate among the Wellesley faculty on whether to accept money from John D. Rockefeller. Her novel Daphne, an Autumn Pastoral was written after a year spent partly in England and partly in Italy and was published in 1903 in The Atlantic Monthly in serial form. Montrose Press in Wakefield, Massachusetts published her novel Pilgrim Feet when she was eighty-one years old.

She contributed poetry, criticism, and essays to Scribner's Magazine, The Atlantic Monthly, North American Review, and The Smart Set. The Cornhill Magazine published several of her short stories.

She gave several talks at Vassar. Her will bequeathed $100,000 to Vassar College and $140,000 to Hindman Settlement School. Her bequest to Vassar established The Margaret Pollock Sherwood 1886 Fund for the college's library. In 1958 the Margaret Sherwood Memorial Window, designed by Martha Hale Shackford (Wellesley Class of 1896), was dedicated in Wellesley's Houghton Memorial Chapel. In 1953 Margaret P. Sherwood established the Martha Hale Shackford Scholarship at Wellesley.

Sherwood died on September 24, 1955, at Newton-Wellesley Hospital in Newton, Massachusetts.

== Books ==
- A puritan Bohemia. Macmillan. 1896.
- Dryden's dramatic theory and practice. Lamson, Wolffe. 1898. (Ph.D. thesis)
- Henry Worthington, idealist. Macmillan. 1899.
- Daphne, an autumn pastoral. Houghton, Mifflin. 1903.
- The story of King Sylvain and Queen Aimée. Macmillan. 1904. (illustrated by Sarah S. Stilwell)
- The coming of the tide. Houghton, Mifflin. 1905.
- The Princess Pourquoi. Houghton, Mifflin. 1907. (collection of short stories previously published in Scribner's Magazine, The Atlantic Monthly, and McClure's; illustrated by Sarah S. Stilwell)
- Nancy's pilgrimage (165 pages). Philadelphia: The Westminster Press. 1911.
- The worn doorstep. Little, Brown. 1916. 1917 edition. 1917.
- Familiar ways. Little, Brown. 1917.
- A world to mend: the journal of a working man. Little, Brown. 1920.
- The upper slopes. Houghton, Mifflin. 1924.
- Undercurrents of influence in English romantic poetry. Harvard University Press. 1934.
- Coleridge's imaginative conception of the imagination (47 pages). Hathaway House Bookshop. 1937.
- Pilgrim feet. Montrose Press. 1949.

=== as Elizabeth Hastings ===
- An experiment in altruism. Macmillan. 1895.

== Plays ==
- Margaret Pollock Sherwood (April 1905). "Vittoria". Scribner's Magazine. XXXVII (4). New York City: Charles Scribner's Sons: 497–502. ISSN 2152-792X. Wikidata Q116367646.
