= Public dispensary =

Free or low-cost medication provider

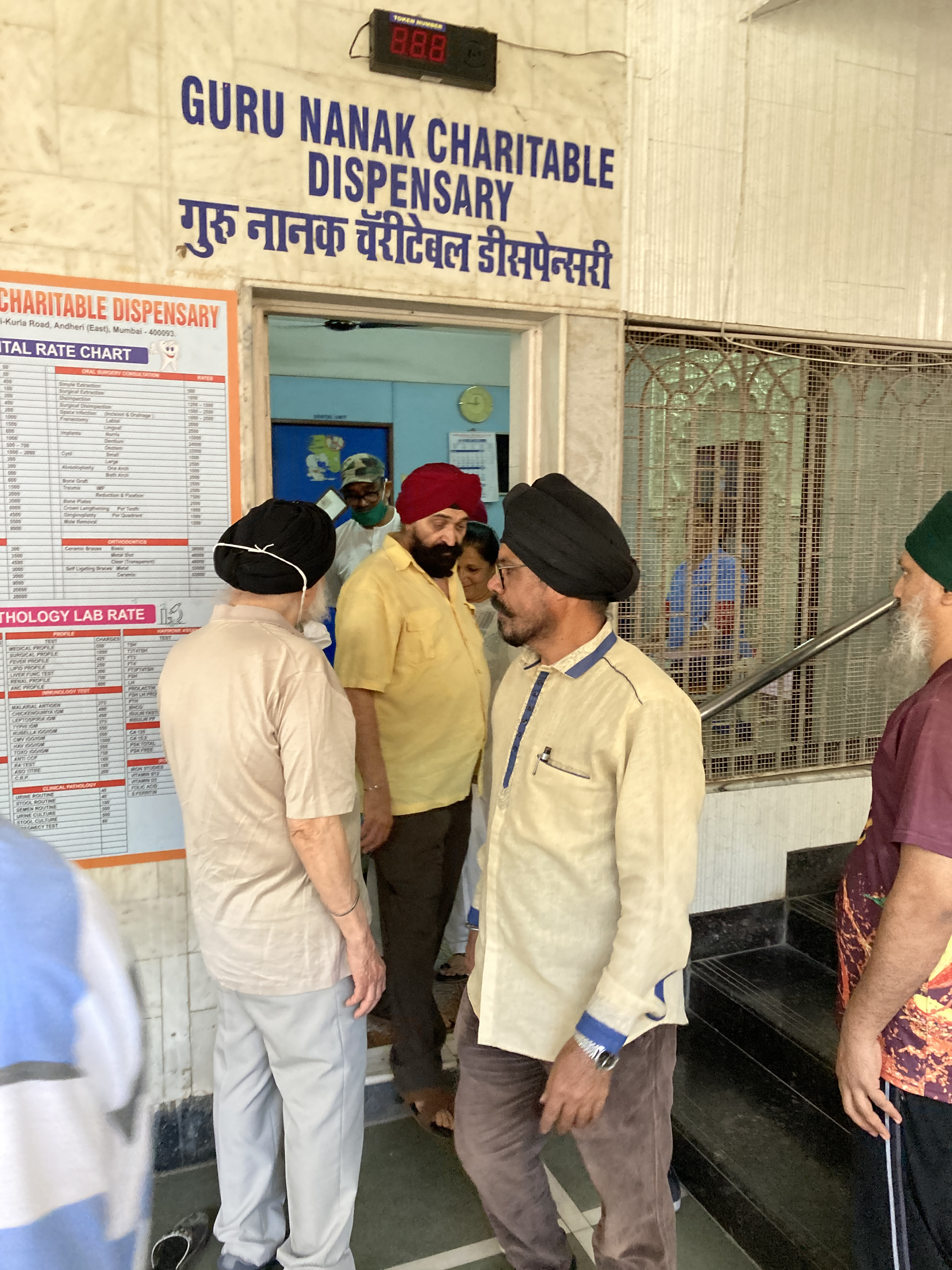
Guru Nanak Punjabi Sabha Charitable Dispensary in Chakala, Mumbai

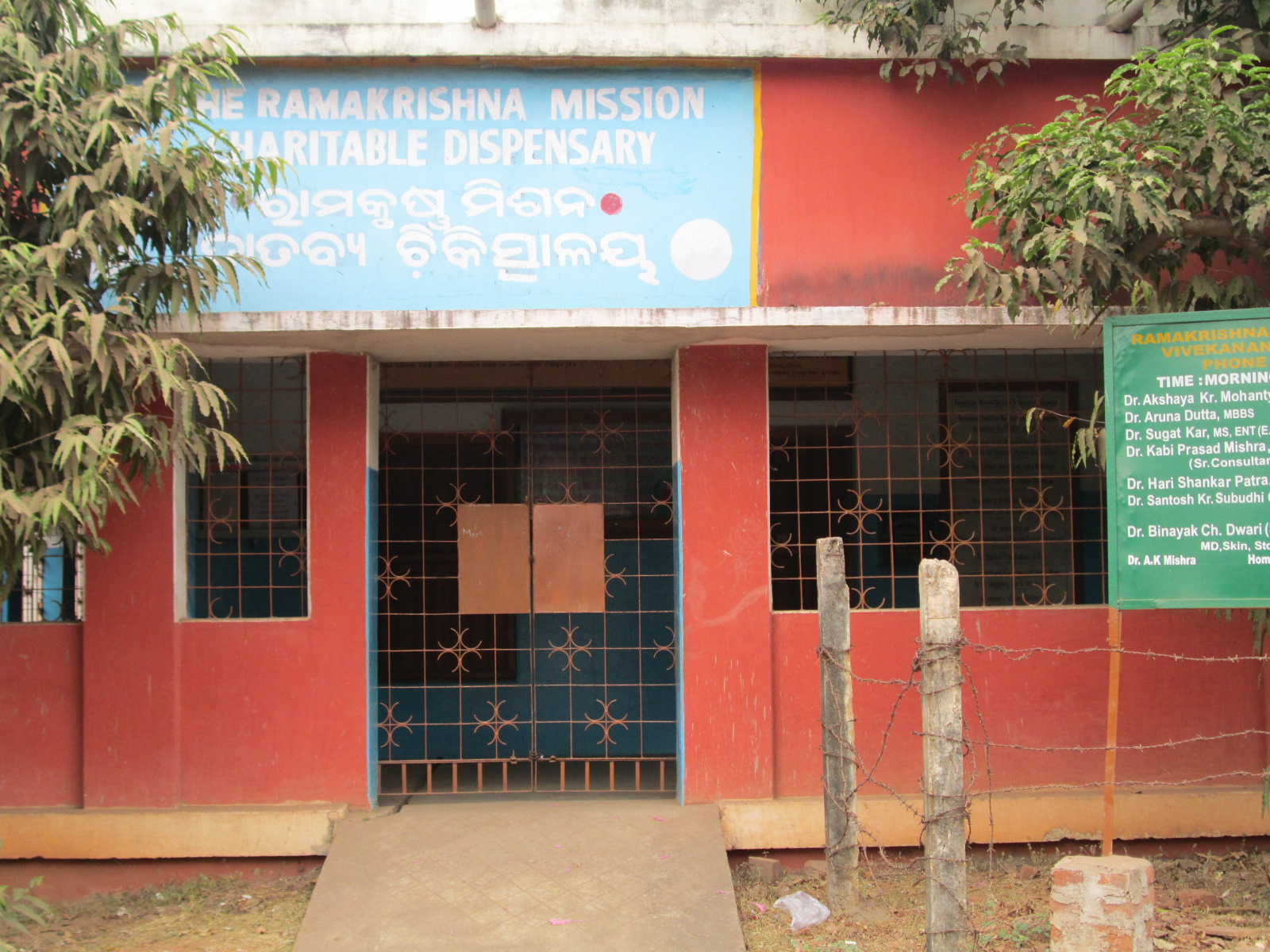
A charitable dispensary in Bhubaneswar, India

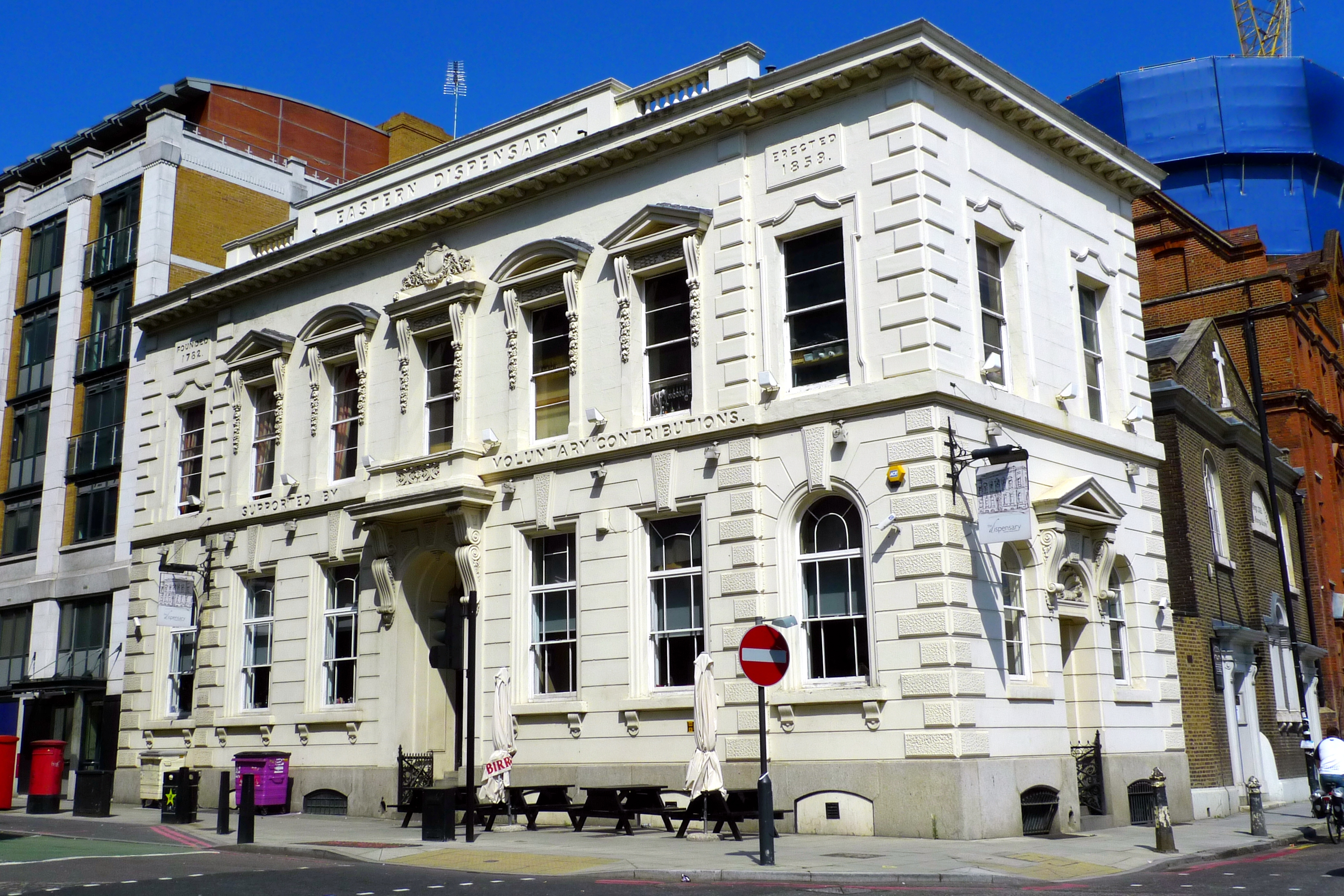
A former dispensary in London

A public dispensary, charitable dispensary or free dispensary gives advice and medicines free-of-charge, or for a small charge.

== Provident dispensary ==
In the 19th and early 20th centuries a provident dispensary was a clinic offering medical care to people who made a small weekly payment as a kind of medical insurance.

== History ==
In England, from the later 18th century onwards, there was a growth in Medical Philanthropy. This saw the establishment of voluntary hospitals offering in-patient and dispensaries offering out-patient treatment. By 1800 dispensaries dealt with at least 10,000 admissions per year.

There are competing claims to where the first dispensary was founded but it is clear that dispensaries began being established in numbers from 1770 onwards. The Philadelphia Dispensary for the Medical Relief of the Poor, founded in 1786, is considered to be the first public dispensary in the United States.

According to a historian of health services "During the nineteenth century access to healthcare was class based".

Dispensaries were funded by voluntary subscriptions. Subscribers would "recommend" local people to be treated by the dispensary. In the main the medical practitioners engaged by dispensaries offered their services for free.

One of the earlier English cities to have a provident dispensary was Coventry (dispensary opened in 1830) where, in the 1840s, members subscribed one penny a week for adults and a halfpenny a week for each of their children. This was seen as a suitable arrangement for working-class people who wanted to be provident and self-reliant, avoiding charitable treatment offered to 'paupers', but with no hope of paying the fees charged to wealthier people. A provident dispensary needed a few hundred 'club' members to pay for one doctor. Some dispensaries had extra funding from philanthropists, and some arranged for hospital specialists to see dispensary patients at reduced fees. Doctors at a few provident dispensaries, in London for example, would visit patients at home.

A provident dispensary was opened in Buffalo, New York in the second half of the 19th century.

In some places the same need might be met by friendly societies organised by the members themselves. Provident dispensaries, on the other hand, were usually set up by prosperous well-wishers and/or by a doctor, as Sophia Jex-Blake did in Edinburgh, with support from a committee.

In Portugal, during the Estado Novo regime (1933–1974), dispensaries with varying characteristics were developed according to the healthcare services provided to different populations. With the primary objective of disease prevention, Maternal and Child Dispensaries, Anti-Tuberculosis Dispensaries, and Social Hygiene Dispensaries (for the prevention and control of venereal diseases) were created and/or developed.The main function of Social Hygiene Dispensaries was to promote and disseminate the principles of personal hygiene, prophylaxis, and treatment of venereal diseases and syphilis, providing the necessary resources to those infected and their families.

== See also ==
- List of public dispensaries
