= Kate Campbell Hurd-Mead =

American gynecologist

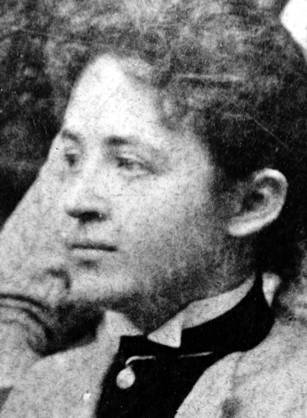
- Born: April 6, 1867; Danville
- Died: January 1, 1941 (aged 73)
- Alma mater: Woman's Medical College of Pennsylvania
- Occupation: Writer, suffragist

Kate Campbell Hurd-Mead (April 6, 1867 – January 1, 1941) was a pioneering feminist and obstetrician who promoted the role of women in medicine. She wrote A History of Women in Medicine: From the Earliest of Times to the Beginning of the Nineteenth Century in 1938. She was born in Danville, Quebec, Canada, and died in Haddam, Connecticut, United States.

== Life ==
Hurd-Mead was the eldest of three children born to Edward Payson Hurd, a practicing physician, and Sarah Elizabeth (Campbell) Hurd. In 1870, the family moved to Newburyport, Massachusetts, where she attended public schools. She decided to study medicine out of respect for her father's career as a doctor, and on the advice of the well-respected physician, Dr. Mary Putnam Jacobi. She became a student at the Woman's Medical College of Pennsylvania in Philadelphia in 1885, where in 1888 she graduated as an M.D. She became an intern at the New England Hospital for Women and Children in Boston where she studied with Dr. Marie Zakrzewska. She did post-doctoral work in Paris, Stockholm, and London.

On her return to America in 1890, she became the medical director for the Bryn Mawr School for Girls in Baltimore, where she instituted the school's innovative preventive health program, which included physical education and periodic medical examinations. With Dr. Alice Hall, she co-founded the Evening Dispensary For Working Women and Girls, the first institution in Baltimore to employ women physicians. She was a strong proponent of the then new maternal hygiene and infant welfare models.

In 1893, Hurd married William Edward Mead, Ph.D., who was professor of early English at Wesleyan University, and they moved to Middletown, Connecticut, to be close to his university.

Hurd-Mead was one of the founders and the consulting gynecologist at the Middlesex County Hospital in Connecticut from 1907 until her retirement in 1925.

She also helped to organize the Middletown District Nurses Association (1900), was vice president of the State Medical Society of Connecticut (1913-1914), president of the American Medical Women's Association, and organizer of the Medical Women's International Association (1919).

At a meeting of the Johns Hopkins Historical Club in 1890 she had become interested in the history of women physicians. She conducted extensive research and published Medical Women of America (1933) and in 1938 the first comprehensive history of women's role in medicine, A History of Women in Medicine: From the Earliest of Times to the Beginning of the Nineteenth Century.

She argued strongly for the real existence of Trotula, the Sicilian woman physician of the Middle Ages, who some historians had tried to argue was not a real person but a name for a collection of works. Hurd-Mead is also responsible for creating the myth of Mother or Mrs Hutton and William Withering. The section on this in her book is unreferenced and appears to have been taken from a 1928 Parke Davis advertising blurb without being thoroughly checked. The purported history in that advertising blurb was false. No such person existed yet many have taken details from Hurd-Meads book and embellished it with details of their own making. Her creation of Mrs. Hutton has been raised and questioned by J. Worth-Estes, Dennis Krikler and others. Similarly, she invented an ancient Egyptian female doctor known as "Merit-Ptah," for whom there is no real evidence.

Hurd-Mead died at the age of 73 in a bushfire near her home while trying to assist her caretaker who also died in the fire.
