= Antihumanism =

Philosophical and social theory critical of traditional humanism

In social theory and philosophy, antihumanism or anti-humanism is a theory that is critical of traditional humanism and its traditional ideas about humanity and the human condition. Central to antihumanism is the view that philosophical anthropology and its concepts of "human nature", "man" or "humanity" should be rejected as historically relative, ideological or metaphysical.

== Origins ==
In the late 18th and 19th centuries, the philosophy of humanism was a cornerstone of the Enlightenment. Human history was seen as a product of human thought and action, to be understood through the categories of "consciousness", "agency", "choice", "responsibility", "moral values". Human beings were viewed as possessing common essential features. From the belief in a universal moral core of humanity, it followed that all persons were inherently free and equal. For liberal humanists such as Immanuel Kant, the universal law of reason was a guide towards total emancipation from any kind of tyranny.

Criticism of humanism as over-idealistic began in the 19th century. For Friedrich Nietzsche, humanism was nothing more than an empty figure of speech – a secular version of theism. Max Stirner expressed a similar position in his book The Ego and Its Own, published several decades before Nietzsche's work. Nietzsche argues in Genealogy of Morals that human rights exist as a means for the weak to constrain the strong; as such, they do not facilitate the emancipation of life, but instead deny it.

The young Karl Marx is sometimes considered an antihumanist, as he rejected the idea of human rights as a symptom of the very dehumanization they were intended to oppose. Given that capitalism forces individuals to behave in an egoistic manner, they are in constant conflict with one another, and are thus in need of rights to protect themselves. True emancipation, he asserted, could only come through the establishment of communism, which abolishes private property. According to many anti-humanists, such as Louis Althusser, mature Marx sees the idea of "humanity" as an unreal abstraction that masks conflicts between antagonistic classes; since human rights are abstract, the justice and equality they protect is also abstract, permitting extreme inequalities in reality.

In the 20th century, the view of humans as rationally autonomous was challenged by Sigmund Freud, who believed humans to be largely driven by unconscious irrational desires.

Martin Heidegger viewed humanism as a metaphysical philosophy that ascribes to humanity a universal essence and privileges it above all other forms of existence. For Heidegger, humanism takes consciousness as the paradigm of philosophy, leading it to a subjectivism and idealism that must be avoided. Like Hegel before him, Heidegger rejected the Kantian notion of autonomy, pointing out that humans were social and historical beings, as well as rejecting Kant's notion of a constituting consciousness. In Heidegger's philosophy, Being (Sein) and human Being (Dasein) are a primary unity. Dualisms of subject and object, consciousness and being, humanity and nature are inauthentic derivations from this. In the Letter on Humanism (1947), Heidegger distances himself from both humanism and existentialism. He argues that existentialism does not overcome metaphysics, as it merely reverses the basic metaphysical tenet that essence precedes existence. These metaphysical categories must instead be dismantled.

== Positivism and scientism ==
Positivism is a philosophy of science based on the view that in the social as well as natural sciences, information derived from sensory experience, and logical and mathematical treatments of such data, are together the exclusive source of all authoritative knowledge. Positivism assumes that there is valid knowledge (truth) only in scientific knowledge. Obtaining and verifying data that can be received from the senses is known as empirical evidence. This view holds that society operates according to general laws that dictate the existence and interaction of ontologically real objects in the physical world. Introspective and intuitional attempts to gain knowledge are rejected. Though the positivist approach has been a recurrent theme in the history of Western thought, the concept was developed in the modern sense in the early 19th century by the philosopher and founding sociologist, Auguste Comte (1798-1857). Comte argued that society operates according to its own quasi-absolute laws, much as the physical world operates according to gravity and other absolute laws of nature.

Humanist thinker Tzvetan Todorov (1939-2017) identified within modernity a trend of thought which emphasizes science and within it tends towards a deterministic view of the world. He clearly identifies positivist theorist Auguste Comte as an important proponent of this view. For Todorov,

"Scientism does not eliminate the will but decides that since the results of science are valid for everyone, this will must be something shared, not individual. In practice, the individual must submit to the collectivity, which 'knows' better than he does. The autonomy of the will is maintained, but it is the will of the group, not the person […] scientism has flourished in two very different political contexts […] The first variant of scientism was put into practice by totalitarian regimes."

A similar approach emerges in the work associated with the Frankfurt School of social research. Antipositivism would be further facilitated by rejections of scientism; or science as ideology. Jürgen Habermas argues, in his On the Logic of the Social Sciences (1967), that

"the positivist thesis of unified science, which assimilates all the sciences to a natural-scientific model, fails because of the intimate relationship between the social sciences and history, and the fact that they are based on a situation-specific understanding of meaning that can be explicated only hermeneutically ... access to a symbolically prestructured reality cannot be gained by observation alone."

== Structuralism ==
Structuralism was developed in post-war Paris as a response to the perceived contradiction between the free subject of philosophy and the determined subject of the human sciences. It drew on the systematic linguistics of Ferdinand de Saussure for a view of language and culture as a conventional system of signs preceding the individual subject's entry into them. In the study of linguistics the structuralists saw an objectivity and scientificity that contrasted with the humanist emphasis on creativity, freedom and purpose.

Saussure held that individual units of linguistic signification - signs - only enjoy their individuality and their power to signify by virtue of their contrasts or oppositions with other units in the same symbolic system. For Saussure, the sign is a mysterious unification of a sound and a thought. Nothing links the two: each sound and thought is in principle exchangeable for other sounds or concepts. A sign is only significant as a result of the total system in which it functions. To communicate by particular forms of speech and action (parole) is itself to presuppose a general body of rules (langue). The concrete piece of behaviour and the system that enables it to mean something mutually entail each other. The very act of identifying what they say already implies structures. Signs are thus not at the service of a subject; they do not pre-exist the relations of difference between them. We cannot seek an exit from this purely relational system. The individual is always subordinate to the code. Linguistic study must abstract from the subjective physical, physiological and psychological aspects of language to concentrate on langue as a self-contained whole.

The structuralist anthropologist Claude Levi-Strauss proclaimed that the goal of the human sciences was "not to constitute, but to dissolve man". He systematised a structuralist analysis of culture that incorporated ideas and methods from Saussure's model of language as a system of signifiers and signifieds. His work employed Saussurean technical terms such as langue and parole, as well as the distinction between synchronic analysis (abstracting a system as if it were timeless) and diachronic analysis (where temporal duration is factored in). He paid little attention to the individual and instead concentrated on systems of signs as they operated in primitive societies. For Levi-Strauss, cultural choice was always pre-constrained by a signifying convention. Everything in experience was matter for communication codes. The structure of this system was not devised by anyone and was not present in the minds of its users, but nonetheless could be discerned by a scientific observer.

The semiological work of Roland Barthes (1977) decried the "cult of the author" and indeed proclaimed his death.

Jacques Lacan's reformulation of psychoanalysis based on linguistics inevitably led to a similar diminishment of the concept of the autonomous individual: "man with a discourse on freedom which must certainly be called delusional...produced as it is by an animal at the mercy of language". According to Lacan, an individual is not born human but only becomes so through incorporation into a cultural order that Lacan terms The Symbolic. Access to this order proceeds by way of a "mirror stage", where a child models itself upon its own reflection in a mirror. Language allows us to impose order on our desires at this "Imaginary" stage of development. The unconscious, which exists prior to this Symbolic Order, must submit to the Symbolic Law. Since the unconscious is only accessible to the psychoanalyst in language, the most he or she can do is decode the conscious statements of the patient. This decoding can only take place within a signifying chain; the signified of unconscious discourse remains unattainable. It resides in a pre-signified dimension inaccessible to language that Lacan calls "The Real". From this, it follows that it is impossible to express subjectivity. Conscious discourse is the effect of a meaning beyond the reach of a speaking subject. The ego is a fiction that covers over a series of effects arrived at independently of the mind itself.

Taking a lead from Brecht's twin attack on bourgeois and socialist humanism, structural Marxist Louis Althusser used the term "antihumanism" in an attack against Marxist humanists, whose position he considered a revisionist movement. He believed humanism to be a bourgeois individualist philosophy that posits a "human essence" through which there is potential for authenticity and common human purpose. This essence does not exist: it is a formal structure of thought whose content is determined by the dominant interests of each historical epoch. Socialist humanism is similarly an ethical and thus ideological phenomenon. Since its argument rests on a moral and ethical basis, it reflects the reality of exploitation and discrimination that gives rise to it but never truly grasps this reality in thought. Marxist theory must go beyond this to a scientific analysis that directs to underlying forces such as economic relations and social institutions.

Althusser considered "structure" and "social relations" to have primacy over individual consciousness, opposing the philosophy of the subject. For Althusser, individuals are not constitutive of the social process, but are instead its supports or effects. Society constructs the individual in its own image through its ideologies: the beliefs, desires, preferences and judgements of the human individual are the effects of social practices. Where Marxist humanists such as Georg Lukács believed revolution was contingent on the development of the class consciousness of an historical subject - the proletariat - Althusser's antihumanism removed the role of human agency; history was a process without a subject.

== Post-structuralism ==
Post-structuralist Jacques Derrida continued structuralism's focus on language as key to understanding all aspects of individual and social being, as well as its problematization of the human subject, but rejected its commitment to scientific objectivity. Derrida argued that if signs of language are only significant by virtue of their relations of difference with all other signs in the same system, then meaning is based purely on the play of differences, and is never truly present. He claimed that the fundamentally ambiguous nature of language makes human intention unknowable, attacked Enlightenment perfectionism, and condemned as futile the existentialist quest for authenticity in the face of the all-embracing network of signs. The world itself is text; a reference to a pure meaning prior to language cannot be expressed in it. As he stressed, "the subject is not some meta-linguistic substance or identity, some pure cogito of self-presence; it is always inscribed in language".

Michel Foucault challenged the foundational aspects of Enlightenment humanism. He rejected absolute categories of epistemology (truth or certainty) and philosophical anthropology (the subject, influence, tradition, class consciousness), in a manner not unlike Nietzsche's earlier dismissal of the categories of reason, morality, spirit, ego, motivation as philosophical substitutes for God. Foucault argued that modern values either produced counter-emancipatory results directly, or matched increased "freedom" with increased and disciplinary normatization. His anti-humanist skepticism extended to attempts to ground theory in human feeling, as much as in human reason, maintaining that both were historically contingent constructs, rather than the universals humanism maintained. In The Archaeology of Knowledge, Foucault dismissed history as "humanist anthropology". The methodology of his work focused not on the reality that lies behind the categories of "insanity", "criminality", "delinquency" and "sexuality", but on how these ideas were constructed by discourses.

== Cultural examples ==
The heroine of the novel Nice Work begins by defining herself as a semiotic materialist, "a subject position in an infinite web of discourses – the discourses of power, sex, family, science, religion, poetry, etc." Charged with taking a bleak deterministic view, she retorts, "antihumanist, yes; inhuman, no...the truly determined subject is he who is not aware of the discursive formations that determine him". However, with greater life-experience, she comes closer to accepting that post-structuralism is an intriguing philosophical game, but probably meaningless to those who have not yet even gained awareness of humanism itself.

== See also ==
- Anti-foundationalism
- Antimaterialism (disambiguation)
- Christian perfection, position in Christianity whose opponents claim entails humans losing their sin
- Cosmicism
- Essentialism and Non-essentialism
- Stanley Fish
- Nancy Fraser
- Hard determinism
- Marx's theory of human nature
- Marxist humanism
- Modernism and Postmodernism
- New Historicism
- Nihilism
- Occamism, which denies universals, instead affirming that only individuals exist
- Original sin
- Philosophical pessimism
- Posthumanism
- Object-oriented ontology, which rejects anthropocentrism
- Social alienation
- Structural Marxism
