= Elizabeth Cushier =

American obstetrician

- Born: November 25, 1837; New York City
- Died: November 25, 1931 (aged 94) (Note: Creese states that she died in 1932, but she was buried December 5, 1931.); York Cliffs, Maine
- Education: New York Infirmary for Women and Children
- Occupation: Physician

Elizabeth M. Cushier (November 25, 1837 – November 25, 1931) was an American professor of medicine, and one of New York's most prominent obstetricians for 25 years before her retirement in 1900.

== Early life ==
Dr. Cushier was born one of eleven children. Her education included a combination of public and private schools and self-exploration. English literature, the French language, and mathematics were of particular interest to her. Besides living in New York, the Cushier family also lived in New Jersey during her childhood.

== Career ==
=== Physician ===
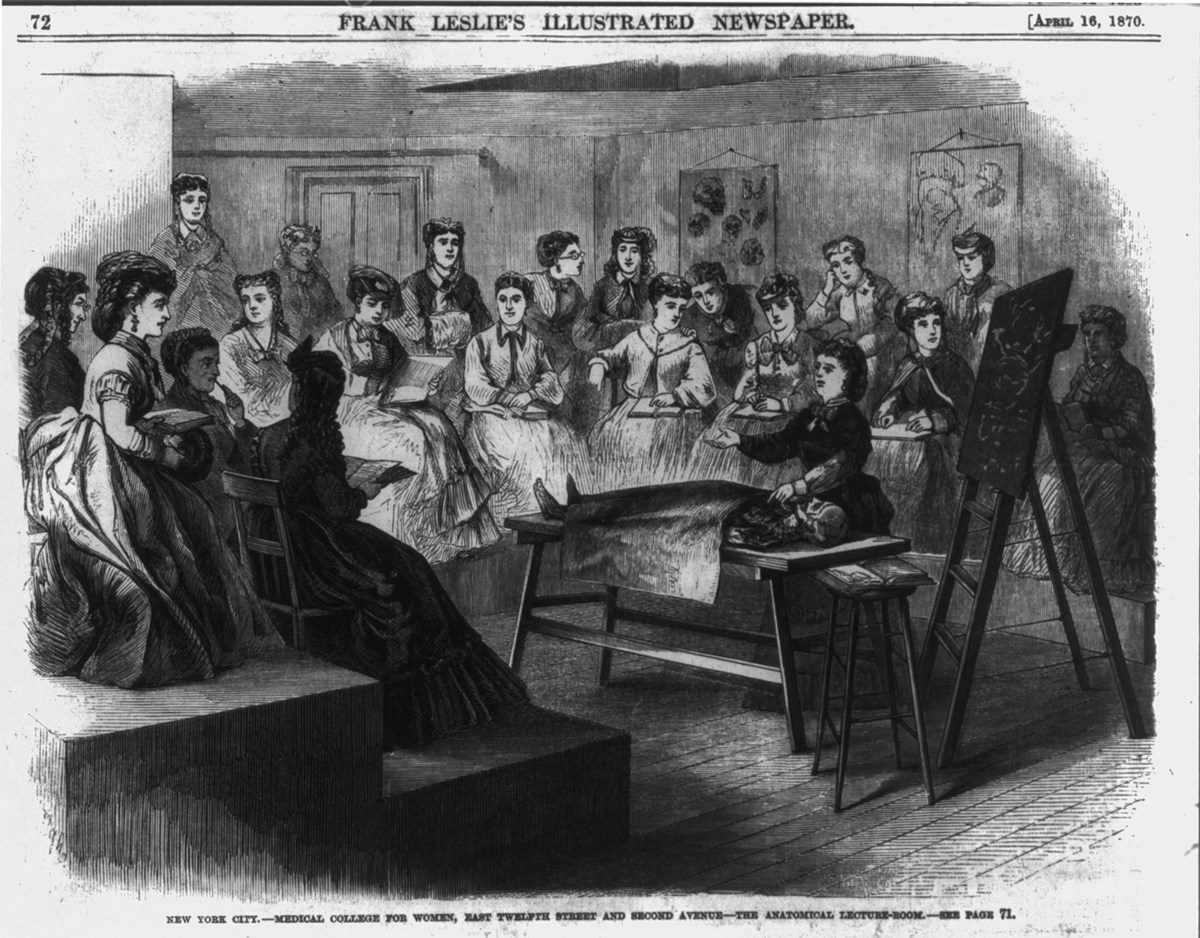
The anatomy lecture room at the Woman's Medical College of New York Infirmary, Frank Leslie's Illustrated Newspaper, April 16, 1870. Library of Congress.

In 1872, Cushier graduated from the Woman's Medical College of the New York Infirmary for Women and Children and completed a year and a half of further studies at the University of Zurich researching pathological and normal histology, since this field of research was not open to women in the United States at that time. Cushier was employed by the Infirmary as a gynecologist and surgeon, becoming known for her expertise in both fields. She wrote articles for medical journals and was a faculty member at the Women's Medical College, and was associated with Emily Blackwell, a pioneer of medical education among women. Cushier ran a private medical practice in New York City. Among her patients was M. Carey Thomas, the second president of Bryn Mawr College.

=== World War I ===
During World War I volunteered for Red Cross and performed relief work in Belgium and France.

== Personal life ==
From 1882, Cushier lived in New York City with Blackwell and an Irish girl named Nanni adopted by Emily Blackwell in 1871. Dr. Mary Putnam Jacobi wrote in 1888 to Elizabeth Blackwell, Emily Blackwell's sister, about Cushier, "She is [...] a remarkable lovely woman, spirited, unselfish, generous and intelligent. I do not know what Dr. Emily would do without her. She absolutely basks in her presence; and seems as if she had been waiting for her for a lifetime." Blackwell and Cushier retired at the turn of the century.

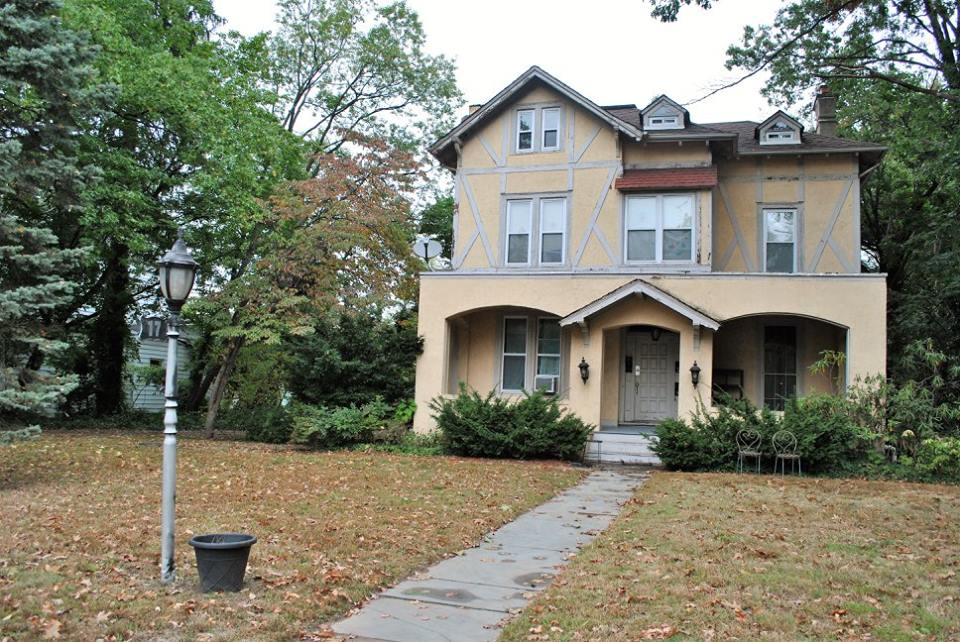
Blackwell and Cushier's house in Montclair, New Jersey

After traveling abroad for a year and a half, they spent the next winters at their home in Montclair, New Jersey and summers near York Cliffs, Maine, where they acquired a summer home.

Blackwell died in September 1910, after which Cushier said that it made "an irreparable break in my life." Cushier died on November 25, 1931, and is buried at Green-Wood Cemetery, Brooklyn.

Elizabeth Burr Thelberg, who studied under Cushier, curated the Autobiography of Dr. Elizabeth Cushier (1933). Cushier's papers are archived among the Blackwell Family Papers at the Schlesinger Library, Radcliffe Institute for Advanced Study at Harvard University.
