= Joseph Kozlowski =

Joseph Kozlowski may refer to:

- Osip Kozlovsky (1757–1831), Russian-Polish composer
- Joseph S. Kozlowski (1912–1992), America artist
