= The Doctors Blackwell =

2021 book by Janice P. Nimura

The Doctors Blackwell: How Two Pioneering Sisters Brought Medicine to Women and Women to Medicine
- Author: Janice P. Nimura
- Language: English
- Subject: Elizabeth and Emily Blackwell
- Publisher: W. W. Norton & Company
- Publication date: January 19, 2021
- Pages: 336
- ISBN: 978-0-393-63554-6 (hbk); 978-0-393-63555-3 (ebook)

The Doctors Blackwell: How Two Pioneering Sisters Brought Medicine to Women and Women to Medicine is a 2021 book by Janice P. Nimura that examines Elizabeth and Emily Blackwell.

== Reception ==
A culture that valorizes heroes insists on consistency, and the Blackwell sisters liked to see themselves as unwavering stewards of lofty ideas. But Nimura, by digging into their deeds and their lives, finds those discrepancies and idiosyncrasies that yield a memorable portrait. "The Doctors Blackwell" also opens up a sense of possibility — you don't always have to mean well on all fronts in order to do a lot of good.

Nimura often sidesteps details of the Blackwells’ private lives and at times presents too much information, particularly about their clothing and residences. Despite the periodic narrative detours, the book moves at a lively pace. Readers learn in sometimes fulsome detail about the limits of “heroic medicine” — the delivery of treatments that had demonstrable effects. And they are offered descriptions of the “milder” alternatives, such as the internal application of leeches in lieu of bloodletting. Nimura correctly names medicine as heroic, not the Blackwell sisters. She presents them instead as pathbreakers; their achievements were their medical degrees and, in Emily’s case, her long practice.

But, if Nimura is too frequently deferential toward her subjects, she is a close and delightful observer of their world. One of the strengths of her book is that it brims with hints of richer stories: the whole of the Blackwell clan and their spouses; the cohort of pioneering female doctors to which the Blackwells belonged; above all, the advancement of medicine beyond its days of “horrid barbarism” and the roles that women have played in that progress.
