= Louise Pearce =

American pathologist (1885–1959)

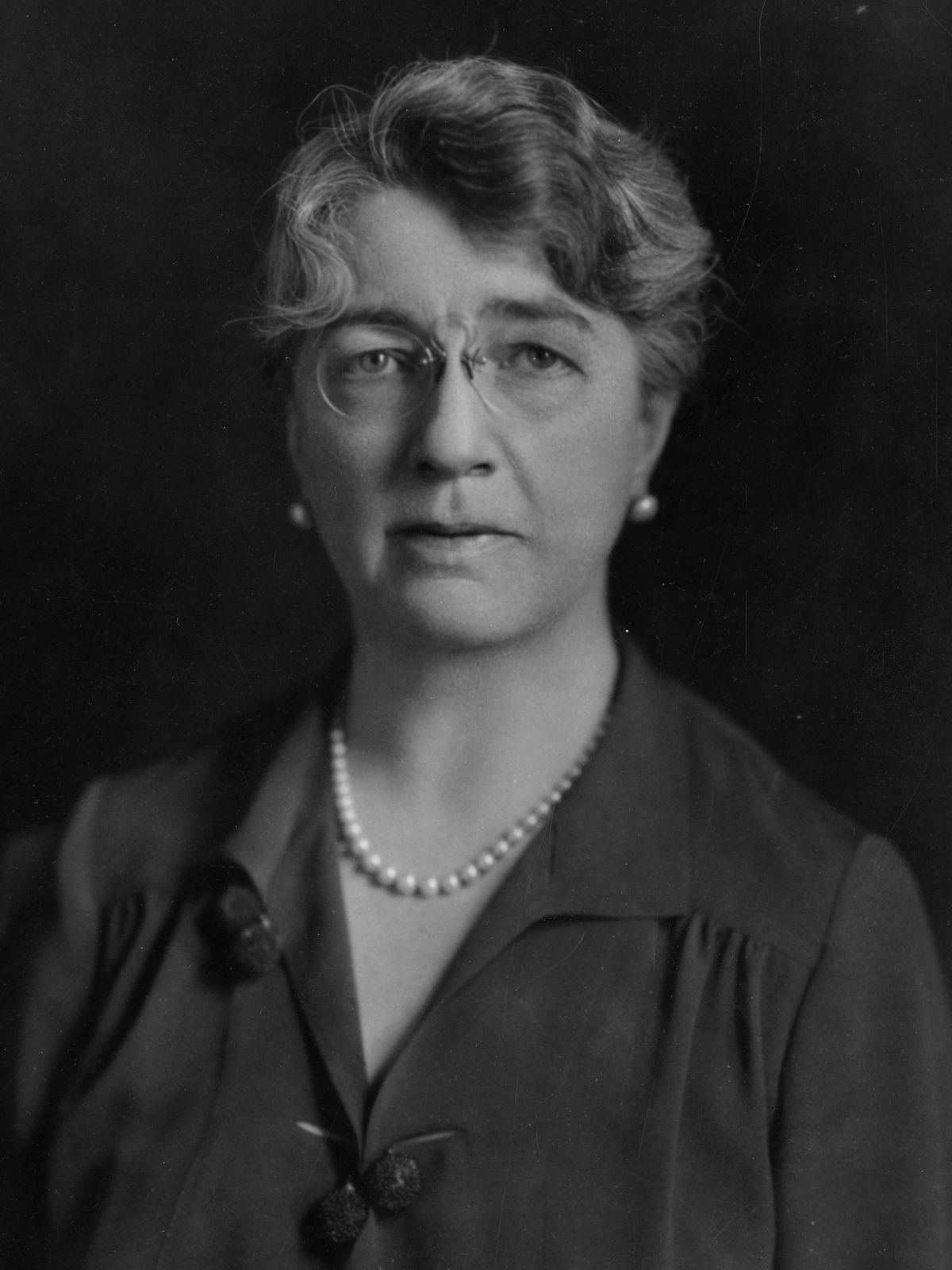
- Born: March 5, 1885; Winchester, Massachusetts, US
- Died: August 10, 1959 (aged 74); New York City, New York State, US
- Education: Stanford University, Boston University, Johns Hopkins University
- Awards: Order of the Crown of Belgium, Officer of the Royal Order of the Lion
- Scientific career
- Fields: Pathology
- Workplaces: Rockefeller Institute

External videos
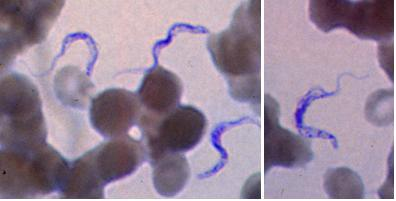
- Unsung Hero: Louise Pearce. Image of blood smear from a patient with African trypanosomiasis, showing trypanosomes.

Louise Pearce (March 5, 1885 – August 10, 1959) was an American pathologist at the Rockefeller Institute who helped develop a treatment for African sleeping sickness (trypanosomiasis). Sleeping sickness was a fatal epidemic which had devastated areas of Africa, killing two-thirds of the population of the Uganda protectorate between 1900 and 1906 alone. With chemists Walter Abraham Jacobs and Michael Heidelberger and pathologist Wade Hampton Brown, Pearce worked to develop and test arsenic-based drugs for its treatment. In 1920, Louise Pearce traveled to the Belgian Congo where she designed and carried out a drug testing protocol for human trials to establish tryparsamide's safety, effectiveness, and optimum dosage. Tryparsamide proved successful in combating the fatal epidemic, curing 80% of cases.

For her work on sleeping sickness, Pearce received the Order of the Crown of Belgium (1920 or 1921). In 1953, Belgium further honored her, appointing Pearce and her co-workers as Officers of the Royal Order of the Lion.

Pearce also successfully developed treatment protocols to apply tryparsamide to syphilis. She spent much of her career studying animal models of cancer.

== Early life ==
Louise Pearce was born on March 5, 1885, in Winchester, Massachusetts. She was the eldest child of Charles Ellis Pearce and Susan Elizabeth Hoyt. They later had a son, Robert. The family moved to California, where Louise attended the Girls Collegiate School in Los Angeles.

== Education and training ==
Louise Pearce received an A.B. degree in physiology and histology from Stanford University in 1907. She was a member of Pi Beta Phi. She attended Boston University from 1907-1909, and was admitted to Johns Hopkins University School of Medicine in 1907, with advanced standing. In 1912 she obtained her M.D. from Johns Hopkins, graduating third in her class. She then worked for a year in the hospital as a house officer, serving at the Phipps Psychiatric Clinic. Pearce was recommended by Dr. Welch of Johns Hopkins as "a promising medical pathologist".

== Rockefeller Institute ==
In 1913, Pearce took a research position at the Rockefeller Institute, the first female to be so appointed. She worked as an assistant to Dr. Simon Flexner, the Institute's director. Pearce remained at Rockefeller Institute for the rest of her career, from 1913 to 1951. She was promoted to associate member in 1923. For much of her time there, she worked closely with pathologist Dr. Wade Hampton Brown. Although she advanced from assistant to associate, she was never promoted to a full member of the institute.

== Sleeping sickness ==
Sleeping sickness was a devastating epidemic which had depopulated whole districts of Africa.

The symptoms of the disease begin very insidiously, some slight change in the former mental attitude of the patient being the first thing noticed by the relatives of the patient. Next, a disinclination to work, with a tendency to sit about and rest more than usual, appears, and at this time headaches and other transient pains may be complained of, especially pains in the upper part of the chest. The facial aspect now also changes, and a previously happy and intelligent looking negro, becomes, instead, dull, heavy and apathetic. Once these changes have appeared, the disease may run an acute or more or less chronic course, progressing however to its ultimate fatal termination... The temperature – a very important point – is elevated, rising in the evenings to 101° or 102°F, falling to subnormal in the morning, the range often extending over four degrees or more, and the pulse of very low tension is accelerated, varying from 90 to 130 beats per minute. These two symptoms are of the greatest diagnostic importance in the early recognition of the disease... Drowsiness, which has gradually been increasing, now passes on to coma, from which the patients can only be roused with difficulty; the temperature falls to subnormal, in rare cases convulsive fits appear, and the patient dies in a complete state of coma. This is the common course of an ordinary acute case of the disease, the different changes taking about a month or six weeks for completion.

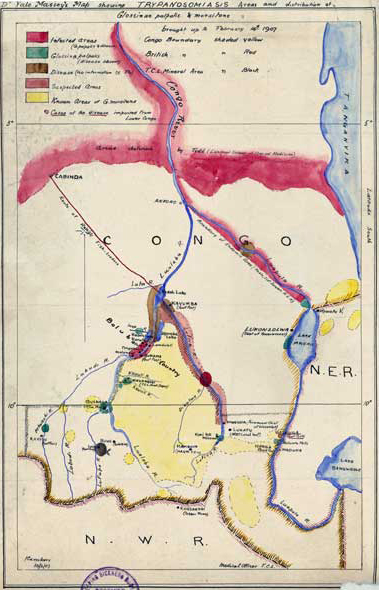
Map showing trypanosomiasis in the Belgian Congo, Dr. A. Yale Massey, 1907

By 1903, researchers had determined that sleeping sickness was caused by a trypanosome, a parasite that lived and multiplied extracellularly in the blood and tissue fluids of its human hosts. Researchers also knew that trypanosomes were transmitted by a species of tsetse fly. It had been suggested that preparations of arsenic might be useful in treating the disease, but an effective treatment had not been found.

At the Rockefeller Institute, Simon Flexner organized a group to test arsenical compounds. Building on the work of Paul Ehrlich in Germany, who had developed an arsenic-derived drug called Salvarsan for the treatment for syphilis, chemist Walter A. Jacobs and immunologist Michael Heidelberger synthesized 243 possible arsenicals, varying methyl groups, amides, and complex side chains. Pearce and Brown studied animal models of the disease in rats, mice, and rabbits, to better understand the course of the disease, and tested all the potential treatments to initially assess effectiveness. In mice and rats the parasites tended to remain in the bloodstream, while in rabbits they invaded the central nervous system, a more comparable model to what happened in humans. The most successful of the possibilities was tryparsamide, a derivative of atoxyl, in which a carboxyl group was converted into an amide to reduce toxicity of the drug. They announced successful results in the Journal of Experimental Medicine in 1919.

The Rockefeller Institute sent Louise Pearce to Léopoldville in the Belgian Congo in 1920 to test tryparsamide, "trusting her vigorous personality to carry out an assignment none too easy for a woman physician and not without its dangers". There she worked with a local hospital and laboratory to design and carry out a drug testing protocol for human trials to establish tryparsamide's safety, effectiveness, and optimum dosage. Almost all early cases of the previously fatal disease were successfully treated, and most patients, even in the later stages of sleeping sickness, could be saved. Human trials also revealed that a side effect of other arsenical compounds, damage to the optic nerve and loss of vision, could occur with high or repeated doses of tryparsamide.

Nonetheless, tryparsamide became the drug of choice for chemotherapy of sleeping sickness for several decades. The compound was able to enter the central nervous system, making it the first drug that could be used to treat later-stage sleeping sickness. It was easy to administer, acted quickly, and cured more than 80% of patients. Later research would show that it was most effective in one variant of the disease, Trypanosoma brucei gambiense, less so in Trypanosoma brucei rhodesiense.

For her work, Pearce received the Order of the Crown of Belgium (1920 or 1921), and in 1953, the King Leopold II prize of $10,000 and the Royal Order of the Lion. Her co-workers were also honored for their contributions. She was also elected as a member of the Belgian Society of Tropical Medicine and attended European meetings from 1921 to 1939.

== Syphilis ==
Brown and Pearce systematically studied syphilis in rabbits, over a period of about 6 years. Their meticulous investigations expanded understanding of the disease, which pursued a course in rabbits similar to that in humans. In particular, they observed the spreading of spirochetes throughout the lymphatic system after its introduction in one area, the creation of syphilitic lesions in areas far from the original inoculation site, and the recurrence of latent infection from within the lymph nodes in the absence of obvious symptoms.

They also investigated the used of tryparsamide as a possible treatment for syphilis. Although it was generally much less powerful against spirochetes than against trypanosomes, tryparsamide's ability to pass the blood-brain barrier and enter the central nervous system made it a useful treatment for syphilis of the brain and spinal cord and the chronic form, general paresis. Tryparsamide was a standard treatment for syphilis until penicillin replaced it in 1950.

== Cancer research ==
During their studies of rabbits, Pearce and Brown discovered a malignant epithelial tumor of the scrotum, the Brown-Pearce Carcinoma. They studied transmission of the tumor by inoculating a series of more than twenty other rabbits, the first reported sequence of more than one or two transfers. While the fundamental nature of the tumor remained the same, its malignancy varied. They attempted to understand the transmission, growth, and remission that they observed of tumors. Because it was thoroughly studied, and replicable, the Brown-Pearce tumor became a standard test material in cancer laboratories.

== Longitudinal studies ==
Observations of differences in tumor development led Brown to research the relationships between bodily constitution (the basic health of an organism) and liability to disease. Brown studied a variety of diseases and their appearance through generations in the rabbit colony, including syphilis and cancer. When rabbit pox unexpectedly ravaged the colony in 1932, they isolated the rabbit pox virus. When the illness disrupted their planned program of study again in 1933 and 1935, they examined immune reactions and rabbit pox, taking advantage of the opportunity to examine viral transmission.

It was increasingly difficult to support the colony in the New York premises, so Flexner recommended that it be moved to Princeton. Soon after the colony was transferred to Princeton, in 1935, Brown himself became ill with a duodenal ulcer. Senior colleagues Louise Pearce and colleague Harry Greene took over direction of the research program, continuing to track bodily status and susceptibility to various diseases.

After Brown's death in 1942, Pearce reduced the size of the colony, narrowed the scope of the investigation, and began to organize and report on the huge amounts of data that had been collected, including (but not limited to) information on early senescence, achondroplasia, osteopetrosis, eye defects, cystic disease, and hydrocephalus. Over a period of years, both before and after her retirement in 1950, she continued to analyze and report on the extensive project.

== Professional associations ==
- first elected woman member of American Society for Pharmacology and Experimental Therapeutics (ASPET) 1915 (only woman member until 1929)
- appointed trustee, New York Infirmary for Women and Children, 1921
- appointed associate member of the Rockefeller Institute, 1923
- appointed to the General Advisory Council of the American Social Hygiene Association, 1925
- appointed visiting professor of syphilology at Peiping Union Medical College, China, 1931
- appointed to the National Research Council, 1931
- named member of the board of the Corporation of the Philadelphia Women's Medical College, 1941
- director of the Association of University Women, 1945
- president of the Woman's Medical College of Pennsylvania, 1946-1951
- president of the Corporation of the Philadelphia Women's Medical College, 1946; retired, 1951

== Awards and honors ==
=== Awards ===
- Order of the Crown of Belgium (1920 or 1921)
- King Leopold II prize of $10,000, Belgium (1953)
- Officer of the Royal Order of the Lion, Belgium (1953)
- Blackwell Citation from the New York Infirmary for Women and Children (1951), as "an imaginative and creative force in medicine".

=== Honorary degrees ===
- honorary Doctor of Science, Sc. D., Wilson College (1947)
- honorary Doctor of Letters, Litt. D., Arcadia University (1948)
- honorary Doctor of Science, Sc. D., Bucknell University (1950)
- honorary Doctor of Medical Science, LL. D., Skidmore College (1950)
- honorary Doctor of Medical Science, D.M.S., Woman's Medical College of Pennsylvania (1952)

== Personal life ==
For many years, Louise Pearce lived with physician Sara Josephine Baker and author Ida A. R. Wylie. All were members of Heterodoxy, a feminist biweekly luncheon discussion club, of which many members were lesbian or bisexual. In the mid-1930s, after Baker retired, the three women lived together at Trevanna Farm, Skillman, New Jersey. After Baker's death in 1945, Wylie and Pearce continued living there until both died in 1959. Her home was described as a "most delightful and interesting place to live and study. Her shelves were crowded with many old editions of medical treasures, the latest scientific literature and the latest works on international questions. She had a wonderful collection of Chinese carvings and porcelains." Wylie and Pearce are buried alongside each other at Henry Skillman Burying Ground, Trevenna Farm's family cemetery.
