= A. Yale Massey =

Canadian missionary and doctor of tropical diseases (1871-1922)

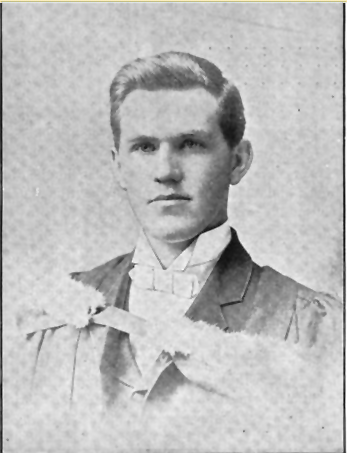
- Born: August 12, 1871; Wallbridge, Hastings County, Canada
- Died: August 22, 1922 (aged 51); Irebu, Coquilhatville, Belgian Congo
- Citizenship: Canadian
- Education: University of Toronto; University College Hospital, London
- Scientific career
- Workplaces: Canada Congregational Foreign Missionary Society, Belgian Congo Medical Service

A. Yale Massey (August 12, 1871 – August 22, 1922), B.A., M.D., was a Canadian physician, missionary, and medical researcher in Portuguese Angola and the Belgian Congo. Massey mapped the occurrence of African sleeping sickness (trypanosomiasis) in the Belgian Congo, showing that the disease was spreading along the banks of rivers. He was elected a fellow of the newly formed Society of Tropical Medicine in London in 1907. He received the Chevalier de l'Ordre Royal du Lion from the King of the Belgians.

== Early life and education ==
Alfred Yale Massey was born in Wallbridge, Hastings County, Ontario, Canada on August 12, 1871, to Levi Massey (April 13, 1827 – January 1, 1912) and Ann Eliza McClatchie (October 1, 1838 – October 28, 1919). He grew up in Belleville, Ontario.

In 1876, Mrs. Levi Massey was the founding president of the Woman's Missionary Society of the Methodist Episcopal Church in Canada, in Belleville, Ontario.

== Career ==
Alfred Yale Massey graduated with his B.A. from Victoria College in 1893 and taught for a year at Wiarton. He went on to earn his M.D., C.M. in 1898 from Trinity Medical College. Both later became part of the University of Toronto in Toronto, Canada.

=== Grenfell Mission ===
Massey spent a year working with the Grenfell Mission in Labrador as part of The Royal National Mission to Deep Sea Fishermen.

=== Foreign Missions ===
In 1899, Alfred Yale Massey joined the foreign mission of the Canada Congregational Foreign Missionary Society (later part of the United Church of Canada). Massey left Montreal, Canada on July 26, 1899, and arrived at the port of Benguella in Portuguese Angola on September 17, 1899. On October 25, 1899, Massey arrived at the mission station in Chisamba to begin work as a missionary doctor. Massey was described as a "beloved physician" and credited with building the first hospital in Bié Province.

It was a period of political turmoil, danger and unrest in Portuguese Angola. The Portuguese government permitted "contract labour" - which Massey described as "a legal term - really slaves". He sent a set of slave shackles home to Canada, that had been left behind by a dealer's caravan.

The marriage of Dr. Alfred Yale Massey and Miss Ella Margaret Arnoldi occurred on either December 7, 1902 or December 9, 1902, at Benguella, West Africa. They were, according to The Missionary Herald of March 1903, "both of the West Central African Mission." Born in Walton, Lean, England on April 27, 1879, Arnoldi was a registered nurse. She is listed as embarking from Montreal on June 21, 1902, and arriving at Benguela on October 10, 1902, two months before their wedding.

In the Annual Report of 1903-1904, it was reported that the couple had returned to North America "on account of Mrs. Massey's health". They arrived in Montreal on May 16, 1904. They were released from the mission as of September 5, 1905.

=== Company doctor ===
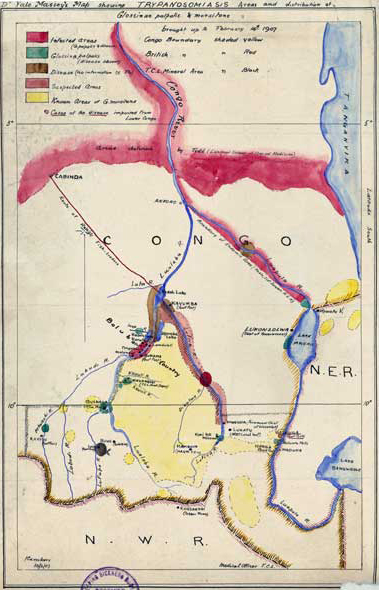
Yale Massey's Map of Sleeping Sickness in the Belgian Congo, 14 February 1907

Massey worked as a company doctor for the Tanganyika Concessions Company and Union Minière du Haut-Katanga in the Katanga Province. In 1905, Massey reported the presence of sleeping sickness among Baluba porters who had been recruited to work from the Bukama Territory of the Democratic Republic of the Congo. Sleeping sickness was a devastating fatal disease that would not be treated successfully until 1920, when Louise Pearce tested arsenic-based drugs.

In 1906 and 1907, Yale Massey mapped the occurrence of African sleeping sickness (trypanosomiasis) and the distribution of the riverine tsetse fly Glossina palpalis and savannah tsetse fly Glossina morsitans in the Belgian Congo, Africa. His maps showed that the disease was spreading along the banks of rivers. He reported the new occurrence of the disease in the Upper Congo in The Lancet.

=== Chief Medical Officer ===
As of 1908 Massey was reported to be practicing medicine of the ear, eye, nose and throat in St. John's, Newfoundland. Subsequently, Massey studied at University College Hospital in London, receiving his Licentiate in Medicine and Surgery of the Society of Apothecaries (L.M.S.S.A.Lond.) in 1913.

Massey enlisted during World War I and served with the rank of Major in the Belgian Congo Medical Service of the Belgian Army. He was stationed at Coquihatville Hospital in the Belgian Congo.

Eventually Massey became a Chief Medical Officer, a position he held until his death. In July 1921, the Vice-Governor General complained that Massey was not following the accepted practice of segregating his patients: he was seeing ambulatory African patients at the Hopital de la Rive where Europeans were treated, rather than at a crumbling hospital designated for Africans.

Throughout his career, Massey continued to study, treat and write about infectious and tropical diseases such as encephalitis, onyalai, and tuberculosis, becoming highly regarded. He was elected a fellow of the newly formed Society of Tropical Medicine in London in 1907. Massey received the Chevalier de l'Ordre Royal du Lion from the King of Belgium.

Massey corresponded with Edwin Ray Lankester and sent specimens of ticks to members of the London School of Tropical Medicine. At least one species has been named after him.

Massey was also an amateur photographer, whose photographs appear in the autobiography of naturalist Cuthbert Christy.

Massey died on August 22, 1922, in Irebu, Coquilhatville, Belgian Congo.
