= Kitty Barry Blackwell =

Adopted daughter of Elizabeth Blackwell

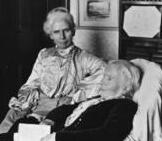
- Kitty (left) with Elizabeth Blackwell, c. 1905
- Born: Katherine Barry; 1848; Ireland
- Died: 1936 (aged 88); United States
- Parent: Elizabeth Blackwell (adoptive)

Katherine "Kitty" Barry Blackwell (born 1848) was an Irish immigrant to the United States and the adopted daughter of Elizabeth Blackwell, the first woman to earn a medical degree in the United States. She served as Elizabeth Blackwell's companion and secretary.

Barry's diary and correspondence have provided scholars with greater insight into the life of Elizabeth Blackwell.

== Biography ==
Kitty Barry Blackwell was born Katherine Barry in Ireland in 1848. She was orphaned, and in 1854, at the age of seven, she was adopted by Elizabeth Blackwell in New York City. Barry was partially deaf, which reportedly affected her confidence.

Barry lived with Blackwell until Blackwell's death in 1910. In 1921, Barry began living with Elizabeth Blackwell's niece Alice Stone Blackwell.
