= Anne Daniel =

American physician and public health reformer

- Born: October 21, 1858
- Died: August 11, 1944 (aged 85)
- Education: Woman's Medical College of the New York Infirmary
- Occupations: Physician, public health reformer

Anne Daniel (also known as Annie Sturgis Daniel) (September 21, 1858 – August 11, 1944) was an American physician and public health reformer who focused on improving living conditions of the tenement population and female prison population in New York City.

== Education ==
Daniel attended the Woman's Medical College of the New York Infirmary, where she specialized in obstetrics, gynecology, and pediatrics. As a student in New York City, she was exposed to the poverty and illness inherent in tenement life. The connection she saw between health and social environment sparked her interest in public reform.

== Career ==
For over 60 years, Daniel taught and supervised students at the New York Infirmary. She focused especially on educating the tenement population on hygiene, childcare, and preventative medicine. She wanted to prevent tenement dwellers from working from their homes, which often involved female and child labor.

Daniel was also heavily involved in local government, pushing for legislation to improve the lives of women and children and women's status in the public sphere. She was a member of the Working Women's Society and a supporter of the early suffrage movement, but much of her legislative efforts dealt with the female prison population. A report she wrote for the Women's Prison Association of New York in 1886 led to the requirement of prisons to hire female wardens to supervise female prisoners.

Daniel wrote a history of the hospital in the 1930s, entitled ′A cautious experiment.′ The history of the New York Infirmary for Women and Children and the Woman's Medical College of the New York Infirmary, which was serialized in the Medical Woman’s Journal (46) between May 1939 and December 1939.

== Influence ==
At the New York Infirmary, Daniel's course “The Normal Child” led to Sara Josephine Baker's fascination with children's healthcare. Baker went on to implement public health measures that, once recognized, saved the lives of millions worldwide.
