= Emily Blackwell =

English-born American physician (1826–1910)

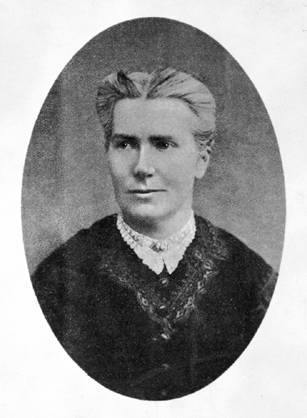
- Born: October 8, 1826; Bristol, England
- Died: September 7, 1910 (aged 83); York, Maine, US
- Education: Western Reserve
- Medical career
- Profession: Physician

Book written by Emily and Elizabeth Blackwell

Emily Blackwell (October 8, 1826 – September 7, 1910) was an American physician and women's rights activist. She was the second woman to earn a medical degree at what is now Case Western Reserve University, after Nancy Talbot Clark. She made major advancements in the medical scene, assisting in the start of the New York Infirmary for Indigent Women and Children and creating the Women's Central Association of Relief. Blackwell, along with her sister Elizabeth, established the Women's Medical College in New York City. Shortly after, she helped form the London School of Medicine for Women. In 1993, she was inducted into the National Women's Hall of Fame.

== Early life and education ==
Blackwell was born on October 8, 1826, in Bristol, England. She was the sixth of nine surviving children of Samuel and Hannah Lane Blackwell. The Blackwell family had been very prosperous for the time, educating Emily with private tutors. The Blackwell household was said to be very intelligent and stimulating. Especially because her father Samuel was many things including a dissident, reformer, and a lay preacher. At a young age Emily was shy but extremely intelligent, she would perform different experiments in her family attic. Also in her youth Emily became an "amateur expert" in certain fields like flowers and birds. She gained this title through reading extensively about and observing different flowers and birds around the family's house. Blackwell's parents were considered to be liberal in their view of education and pushed mathematics and science on her at a young age. In 1832, Blackwell and her family emigrated to the United States. They spent time living in New York City, NY and Jersey City, New Jersey before her family finally settled near Cincinnati, Ohio in 1837. Her father passed shortly after this move, in 1838, when Emily was at the age of eleven, and by 1844, the family was living at Lane Theological Seminary in Walnut Hills. It was here that the children made friends with Henry Ward Beecher and Harriet Beecher Stowe, whose father had founded the seminary.

Inspired by the example of her older sister, Elizabeth, Blackwell applied to study medicine at Geneva Medical College in Geneva, New York, from which her sister graduated in 1849, but was rejected. After being rejected by several other schools, she was finally accepted in 1853 by Rush Medical College in Chicago, where she studied for a year. However, in 1853, when male students complained about having to study with a woman, the Illinois Medical Society vetoed her admission. Eventually, she was accepted to the Medical College of Cleveland, Ohio, Medical Branch of Western Reserve University, earning her Doctor of Medicine in 1854 with honors.

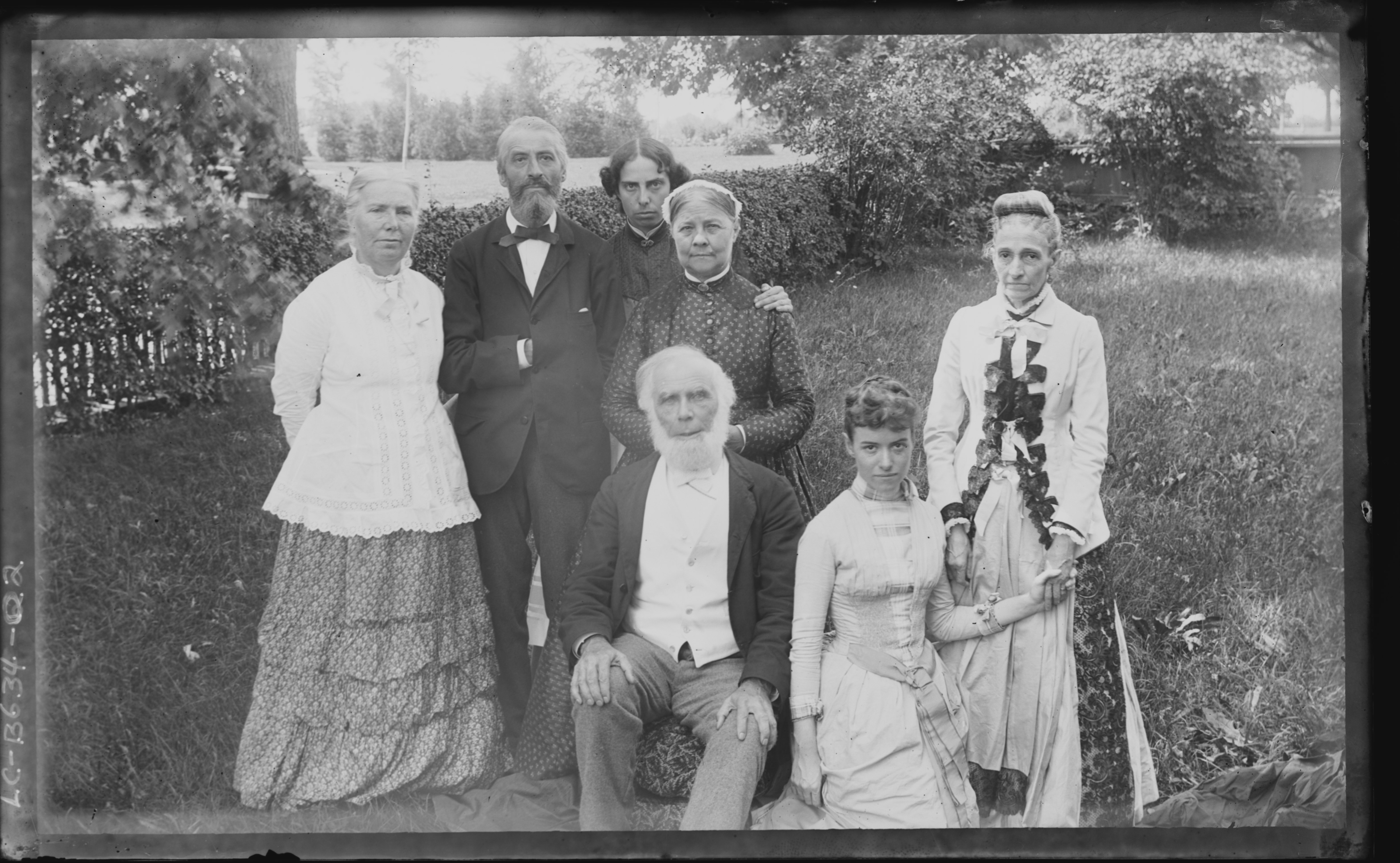
Group portrait of members of the Blackwell and Spofford families

At Western Reserve University, the medical education of women began at the urging of Dean John Delamater, who was backed by the Ohio Female Medical Education Society, formed in 1852 to provide moral and financial support for the women medical students. Despite their efforts, the Western Reserve faculty voted to put an end to Delamater's policies in 1856, finding it "inexpedient" to continue admitting women. (The American Medical Association also adopted a report in 1856 advising against coeducation in medicine.) Western Reserve resumed admitting women in 1879, but did so only sporadically for five years. Admission of women at Western Reserve recommenced on a continuous basis in 1918.

After earning her medical degree, Blackwell pursued further studies in Edinburgh under Sir James Young Simpson, in London under Dr. William Jenner, and in Paris, Berlin, and Dresden.

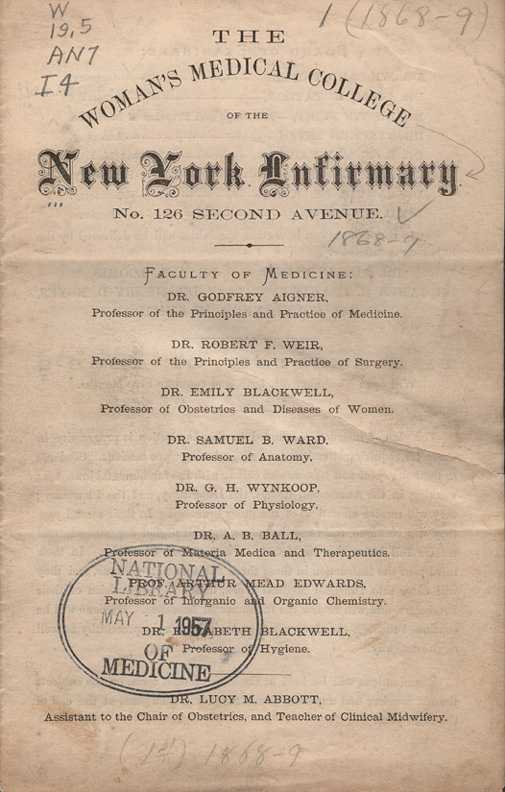
The Woman's Medical College of the New York Infirmary [announcement, 1868–69]

== Career ==
In 1857, Blackwell, along with her sister Elizabeth and Marie Zakrzewska, established the New York Infirmary for Indigent Women and Children. Also Emily raised $50,000 to start a medical school in 1859. And in 1860 the infirmary began to train women as assistant physicians. From the beginning, Emily Blackwell took responsibility for the management of the infirmary and for the raising of funds. For the next forty years, she managed the infirmary, overseeing surgery, nursing, and bookkeeping. Blackwell traveled to Albany to convince the legislature to provide the hospital with funds that would ensure long-term financial stability. She transformed an institution housed in a rented 16-room house into a full-fledged hospital. In 1871 the New York County Medical Society accepted Emily as a member. By 1874, the infirmary served over 7,000 patients annually. Emily Blackwell is largely responsible for the long term survival of the New York Infirmary for Indigent Women and Children. With Blackwell's assistance, the infirmary was able to provide medical care to underserved women and children in the community.

During the American Civil War, Blackwell helped organize the Women's Central Association of Relief, which selected and trained nurses for service in the war. The WCAR had trained close to 4000 American women in order to distribute life-saving supplies across the United States. Between the years 1861 to 1863, the group had distributed over 470,000 articles of clothing and close to 300,000 bedding items. Emily and Elizabeth Blackwell and Mary Livermore also played an important role in the development of the United States Sanitary Commission. After the war, in 1868 the Blackwell sisters established the Women's Medical College in New York City. For 30 years Emily served as a professor for over 300 women in studies of obstetrics and gynecology before co-ed medical schools were a common practice, and in 1869, when Elizabeth moved to London to help form the London School of Medicine for Women, became dean of the college. In 1876 it became a three-year institution, and in 1893 it became a four-year college, ahead of much of the profession. By 1899 the college had trained 364 women doctors. Among those on staff at the college during this time was Mary Putnam Jacobi, who taught materia medica and therapeutics.

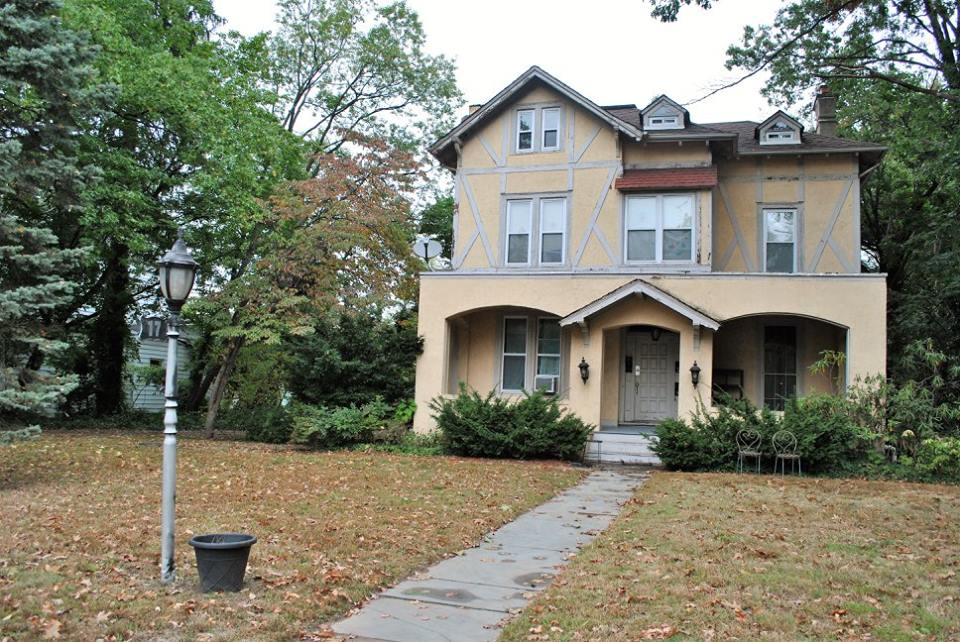
Blackwell and Cushier's house in Montclair, New Jersey

From 1883, Blackwell lived with Elizabeth Cushier, who also served as a doctor at the infirmary. When Blackwell was 44, she adopted a baby named Nanny. Blackwell and Cushier retired at the turn of the century. Blackwell had viewed her retirement as an opportunity to focus her efforts on the expansion of social formalities by addressing more broad social issues and pushing for continuous societal change. Following Emily's retirement in 1900, the infirmary still stands and does excellent work under a new name, the NYU downtown hospital. After traveling abroad in Europe for a year and a half, they spent the next winters at their home in Montclair, New Jersey, and summers in York Cliffs, Maine. She also frequently traveled to California and parts of Southern Europe for her health. Emily was able to see her sister Elizabeth one final time in 1906 before the eldest Blackwell fell down a flight of stairs and never fully recovered and ended up passing in May 1910. Emily Blackwell died due to enterocolitis on September 7, 1910, in York Cliffs, Maine, a few months after her sister Elizabeth's death in England.
