= Elizabeth Blackwell =

British-American physician (1821–1910)

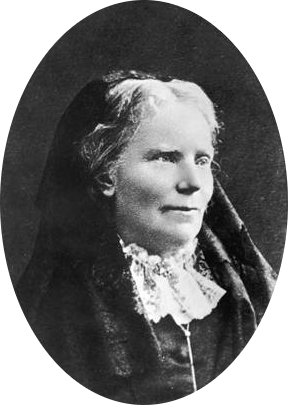
- Born: 3 February 1821; Bristol, England
- Died: 31 May 1910 (aged 89); Hastings, England
- Citizenship: British and American
- Education: Geneva Medical College
- Occupation: Physician

Elizabeth Blackwell (3 February 1821 – 31 May 1910) was an English-American physician, notable as the first woman to earn a medical degree in the United States, and the first woman on the Medical Register of the General Medical Council for the United Kingdom. Blackwell played an important role in both the United States and the United Kingdom as a social reformer, and was a pioneer in promoting education for women in medicine. Her contributions remain celebrated with the Elizabeth Blackwell Medal, awarded annually to a woman who has made a significant contribution to the promotion of women in medicine.

Blackwell was not initially interested in a career in medicine. She became a schoolteacher in order to support her family. This occupation was seen as suitable for women during the 1800s; however, she soon found it unsuitable for her. Blackwell's interest in medicine was sparked after a friend fell ill and remarked that, had a female doctor cared for her, she might not have suffered so much. Blackwell began applying to medical schools and immediately began to endure the prejudice against her sex that would persist throughout her career. She was rejected from each medical school she applied to, except Geneva Medical College in New York, in which the male students voted in favor of Blackwell's acceptance, albeit as a joke. Thus, in 1847, Blackwell became the first woman to attend medical school in the United States. In 1871, Geneva Medical College was disbanded and was transferred to Syracuse University until 1950 when it became SUNY Upstate Medical University, which counts Blackwell among its alumni.

Blackwell's inaugural thesis on typhoid fever, published in 1849 in the Buffalo Medical Journal and Monthly Review, shortly after she graduated, was the first medical article published by a female student from the United States. It portrayed a strong sense of empathy and sensitivity to human suffering, as well as strong advocacy for economic and social justice. This perspective was deemed by the medical community as feminine.

Blackwell founded the New York Infirmary for Women and Children with her sister Emily Blackwell in 1857, and began giving lectures to female audiences on the importance of educating girls. She played a significant role during the American Civil War by organising nurses, and the Infirmary developed a medical school program for women, providing substantial work with patients (clinical education). Returning to England, she helped found the London School of Medicine for Women in 1874.

== Early life ==
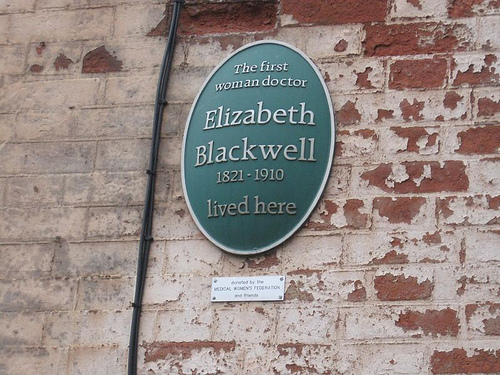
Plaque at Blackwell's family home in Bristol, England, 2010

Elizabeth was born on 3 February 1821, in Bristol, England, to Samuel Blackwell, a sugar refiner, and his wife Hannah (Lane) Blackwell. She had two older siblings, Anna and Marian, and six younger siblings: Samuel (married Antoinette Brown), Henry (married Lucy Stone), Emily (second woman in the U.S. to get a medical degree), Sarah Ellen (a writer), John and George. She also had four maiden aunts: Barbara, Ann, Lucy and Mary, who also lived with them.

In 1832, the Blackwell family emigrated from Bristol, England, to New York because Samuel Blackwell had lost their most profitable sugar refinery in a fire. He hoped to promote beet sugar and introduce the vacuum pan process "so that by degrees all need for the slave will pass". In Jersey City, New Jersey, Elizabeth's father became active in abolitionist work. Regular visitors to their house included William Lloyd Garrison, one of the leaders of the anti-slavery campaign, and feminist and social activist Frances Wright. Therefore, their dinnertime discussions often surrounded issues such as women's rights, slavery and child labor. The children voluntarily gave up sugar out of anti-slavery principle. These liberal discussions reflected Hannah and Samuel's attitudes toward child rearing. For example, rather than beating the children for bad behavior, Barbara Blackwell recorded their trespasses in a black book. If the offenses accumulated, the children would be exiled to the attic during dinner. Samuel Blackwell was similarly liberal in his attitude towards the education of his children. Samuel Blackwell was a Congregationalist and exerted a strong influence over the religious and academic education of his children. He believed that each child, including his girls, should be given the opportunity for unlimited development of their talents and gifts. This perspective was rare during that time, as most people believed that the woman's place was in the home or as a schoolteacher. Blackwell had not only a governess, but private tutors to supplement her intellectual development. As a result, she was rather socially isolated from all but her family as she grew up.

The family moved to Cincinnati, Ohio, a few years later. When Blackwell was 17, her father died, leaving the family with little money.

=== Early adulthood ===
The Blackwells' financial situation was unfortunate. Pressed by financial need, the sisters Anna, Marian and Elizabeth started a school, The Cincinnati English and French Academy for Young Ladies, which provided instruction in most, if not all, subjects and charged for tuition and room and board. The school was not innovative in its education methods, but provided a source of income for the Blackwell sisters. Blackwell was less active in her abolitionism during these years, likely due to her responsibilities running the academy.

In December 1838, Blackwell converted to Episcopalianism, probably due to her sister Anna's influence, becoming an active member of St. Paul's Episcopal Church. However, William Henry Channing's arrival in 1839 to Cincinnati changed her mind. Channing, a charismatic Unitarian minister, introduced the ideas of transcendentalism to Blackwell, who started attending the Unitarian Church. A conservative backlash from the Cincinnati community ensued, and as a result, the academy lost many pupils and was abandoned in 1842. Blackwell began teaching private pupils.

Channing's arrival renewed Blackwell's interests in education and reform. She worked at intellectual self-improvement: studying art, attending various lectures, writing short stories and attending various religious services in many denominations (Quaker, Millerite, Jewish). In the early 1840s, she began to articulate thoughts about women's rights in her diaries and letters and participated in the Harrison political campaign of 1840.

In 1844, with the help of her sister Anna, Blackwell procured a teaching job that paid $1,000 (~$34,554 in 2025) per year in Henderson, Kentucky. Although she was pleased with her class, she found the accommodations and schoolhouse lacking. What disturbed her most was that this was her first real encounter with the realities of slavery. "Kind as the people were to me personally, the sense of justice was continually outraged; and at the end of the first term of engagement I resigned the situation." She returned to Cincinnati half a year later. Her family had settled at Walnut Hills and became intimate with abolitionist thinkers Professor Stowe and Harriet Beecher Stowe.

== Education ==
=== Pursuit of medical education ===
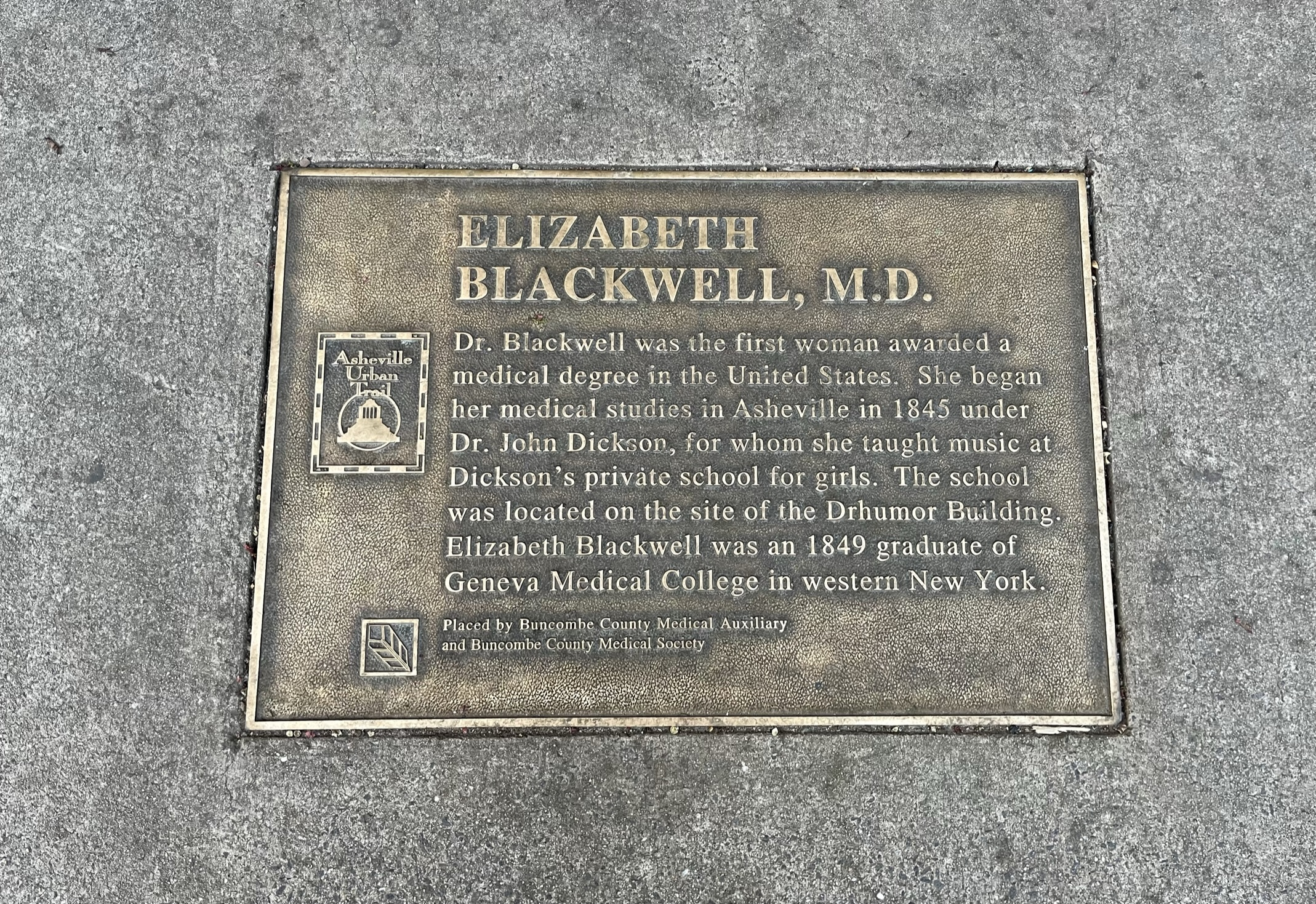
A plaque commemorating Blackwell's medical studies in Asheville, North Carolina

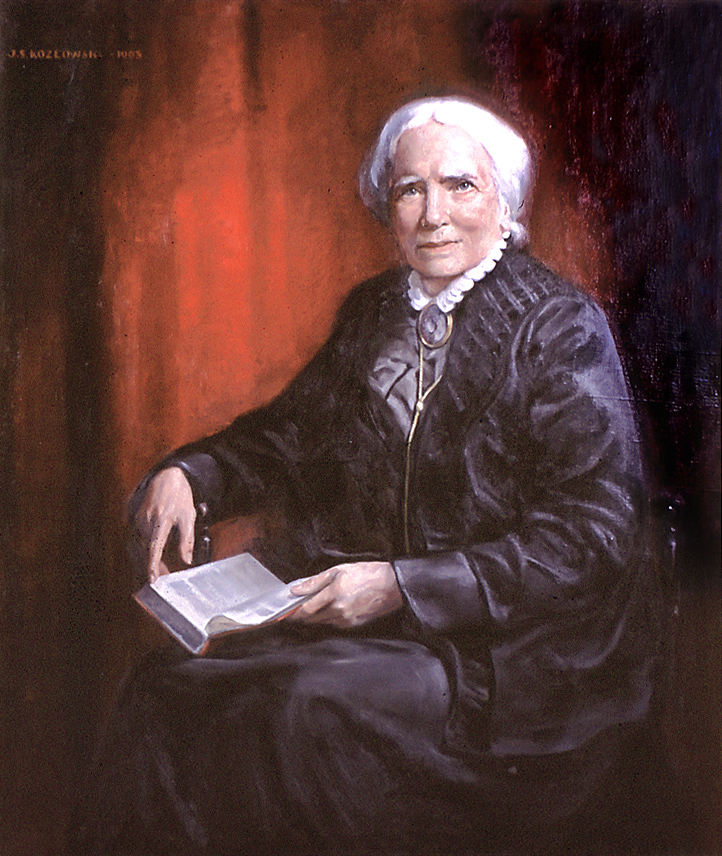
Portrait of Elizabeth Blackwell by Joseph Stanley Kozlowski, 1963. Collection of SUNY Upstate Medical University.

Once again, through her sister Anna, Blackwell procured a job, this time teaching music at Asheville Female Seminary in Asheville, North Carolina, with the goal of saving the $3,000 necessary for her medical school expenses. In Asheville, Blackwell lodged with the respected Reverend John Dickson, who had been a physician before he became a clergyman. Dickson approved of Blackwell's career aspirations and allowed her to use the medical books in his library to study. During this time, Blackwell soothed her own doubts about her choice and her loneliness with deep religious contemplation. She also renewed her antislavery interests, starting a slave Sunday school that was ultimately unsuccessful.

Dickson's school closed down soon after opening, and Blackwell moved to the residence of Reverend Dickson's brother, Samuel, a prominent Charleston physician. In 1846, she began teaching at a boarding school in Charleston run by a Mrs. Du Pré. With the help of Samuel Dickson's brother, Blackwell inquired into the possibility of medical study via letters, with no favorable responses. In 1847, Blackwell left Charleston for Philadelphia and New York, with the aim of personally investigating the opportunities for medical study. Blackwell's greatest wish was to be accepted into a Philadelphia medical school.

My mind is fully made up. I have not the slightest hesitation on the subject; the thorough study of medicine, I am quite resolved to go through with. The horrors and disgusts I have no doubt of vanquishing. I have overcome stronger distastes than any that now remain, and feel fully equal to the contest. As to the opinion of people, I don't care one straw personally; though I take so much pains, as a matter of policy, to propitiate it, and shall always strive to do so; for I see continually how the highest good is eclipsed by the violent or disagreeable forms which contain it.

Upon reaching Philadelphia, Blackwell boarded with William Elder and studied anatomy privately with Jonathan M. Allen as she attempted to enroll in any medical school in Philadelphia. She was met with resistance almost everywhere. Most physicians recommended that she either go to Paris to study or take up a disguise as a man to study medicine. The main reasons offered for her rejection were that (1) she was a woman and therefore intellectually inferior, and (2) she might actually prove equal to the task, prove to be competition, and that she could not expect them to "furnish [her] with a stick to break our heads with." Out of desperation, she applied to twelve "country schools."

=== Medical education in the United States ===
In October 1847, Blackwell was accepted to Geneva Medical College in Geneva, New York. The dean and faculty, usually responsible for evaluating an applicant for matriculation, initially were unable to make a decision due to Blackwell's gender. They put the issue up to a vote by the 150 male students of the class with the stipulation that if one student objected, Blackwell would be turned away. The young men voted unanimously to accept her, whilst simultaneously treating her application as a joke.

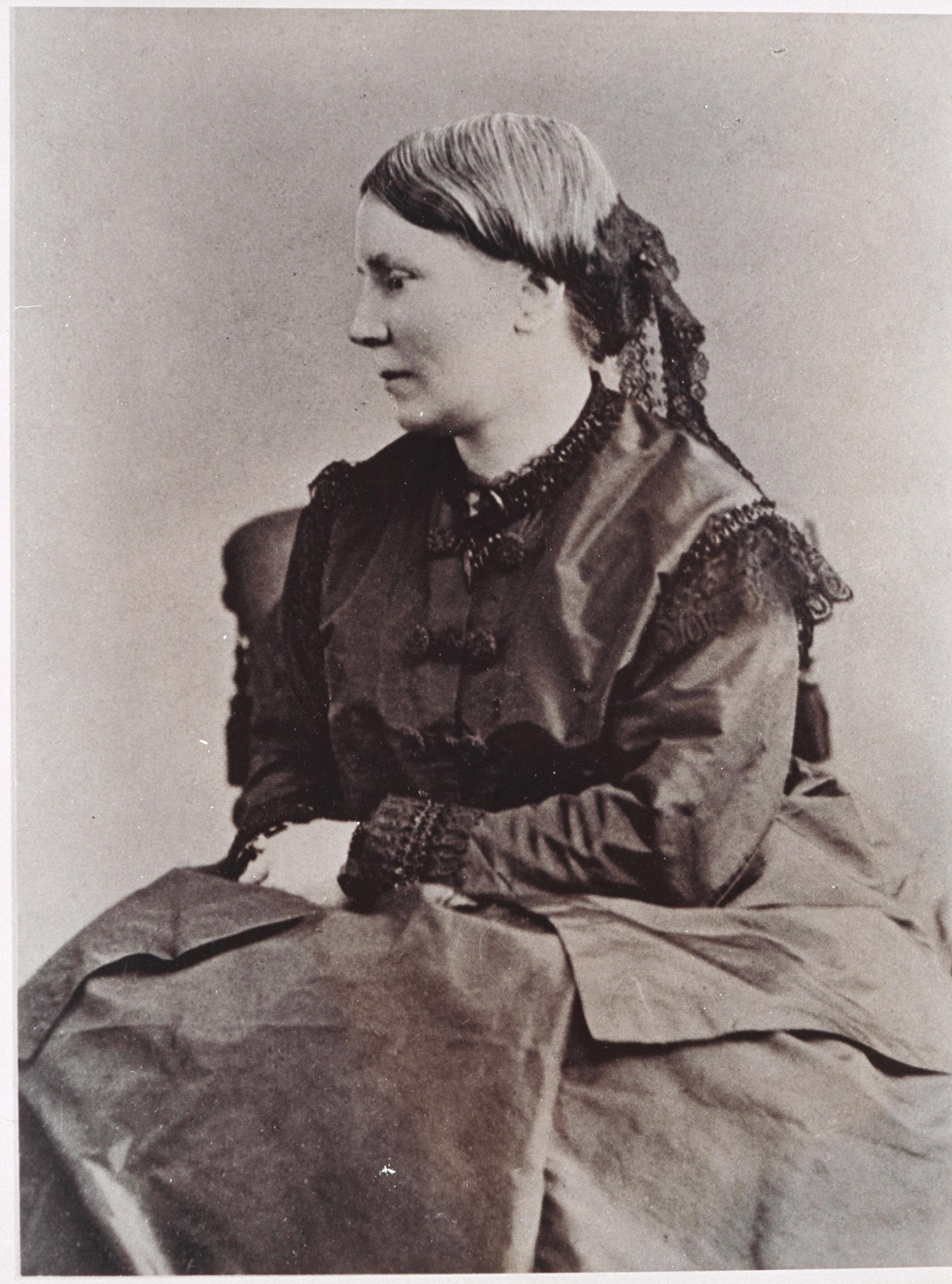
Portrait of Elizabeth Blackwell, c. 1850–1860

While at school, Blackwell was looked upon as an oddity by the townspeople of Geneva. She also rejected suitors and friends, preferring to isolate herself. In the summer between her two terms at Geneva, she returned to Philadelphia, stayed with Elder, and applied for medical positions in the area to gain clinical experience. The Guardians of the Poor, the city commission that ran Blockley Almshouse, granted her permission to work there, albeit not without some struggle. Blackwell slowly gained acceptance at Blockley, although some young resident physicians still refused to assist her in diagnosing and treating her patients. During her time there, Blackwell gained valuable clinical experience, but was appalled by the syphilitic ward and the condition of typhus patients. Her graduating thesis at Geneva Medical College was on the topic of typhus. The conclusion of this thesis linked physical health with socio-moral stability – a link that foreshadows her later reform work.

On 23 January 1849, Blackwell became the first woman to earn a medical degree in the United States. The local press reported her graduation favorably, and when the dean, Charles Lee, conferred her degree, he stood up and bowed to her.

=== Medical education in Europe ===
In April 1849, Blackwell decided to continue her studies in Europe. She visited a few hospitals in Britain and then went to Paris. In Europe, she was rejected by many hospitals because of her sex. In June, Blackwell enrolled at La Maternité; a "lying-in" hospital, under the condition that she would be treated as a student midwife, not a physician. She made the acquaintance of Hippolyte Blot, a young resident physician at La Maternité. She gained much medical experience through his mentoring and training. By the end of the year, Paul Dubois, the foremost obstetrician in his day, had voiced his opinion that she would make the best obstetrician in the United States, male or female.

On 4 November 1849, when Blackwell was treating an infant with ophthalmia neonatorum, she accidentally squirted some contaminated fluid into her own eye and contracted the infection. She lost sight in her left eye, requiring its surgical extraction and leaving her without hope of becoming a surgeon. After a period of recovery, she enrolled at St Bartholomew's Hospital in London in 1850. She regularly attended James Paget's lectures. She made a positive impression there, although she did meet opposition when she tried to observe the wards.

Feeling that the prejudice against women in medicine was not as strong in the United States, Blackwell returned to New York City in 1851 with the hope of establishing her own practice.

== Career ==
=== Medical career in the United States ===
In the United States, Blackwell faced sexism, but received support from some media publications, including the New-York Tribune. Her practice floundered at first, a situation some historians attribute to false accusations that all women doctors were abortion care providers. In 1852, Blackwell began delivering lectures and published The Laws of Life with Special Reference to the Physical Education of Girls, her first work, a volume about the physical and mental development of girls that concerned itself with the preparation of young women for motherhood.

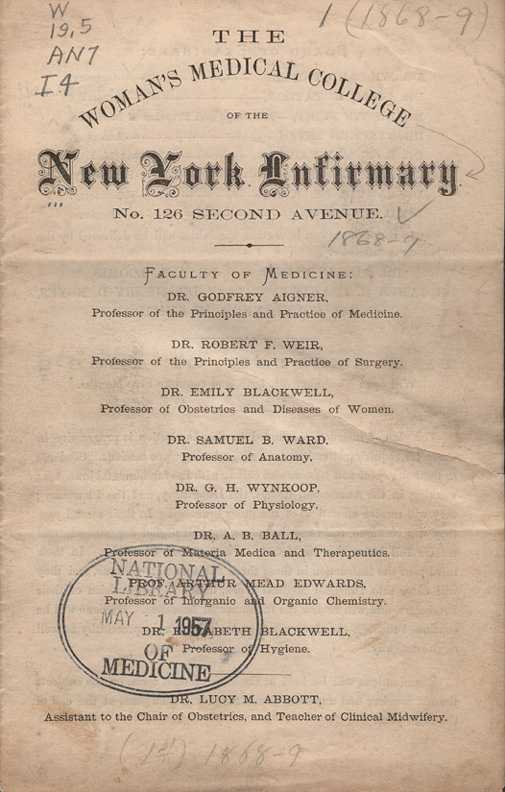
The Woman's Medical College of the New York Infirmary (announcement, 1868–69)

In 1853, Blackwell established a small dispensary near Tompkins Square. She also began mentoring Marie Zakrzewska, a Polish woman pursuing a medical education, serving as her preceptor in her pre-medical studies. In 1857, Marie Zakrzewska, along with Blackwell and her sister Emily, who had also obtained a medical degree, expanded Blackwell's original dispensary into the New York Infirmary for Indigent Women and Children. Women served on the board of trustees, on the executive committee and as attending physicians. The institution accepted both in- and outpatients and served as a nurse's training facility. The patient load doubled in the second year.

=== Civil War efforts ===
When the American Civil War broke out, the Blackwell sisters aided in nursing efforts on the side of the Union Army. Blackwell sympathised heavily with the North due to her abolitionist roots, and even said she would have left the country if the North had compromised on the subject of slavery. However, Blackwell did meet with some resistance on the part of the male-dominated United States Sanitary Commission (USSC). The male physicians refused to help with the nurse education plan if it involved the Blackwells. In response to the USSC, Blackwell organised with the Woman's Central Relief Association (WCRA). The WCRA worked against the problem of uncoordinated benevolence, but ultimately was absorbed by the USSC. Still, the New York Infirmary managed to work with Dorothea Dix to train nurses for the Union effort.

=== Medical career at home and abroad ===
Blackwell made several trips to Britain to raise funds and to try to establish a parallel infirmary project there. Due to a clause in the Medical Act 1858 that recognised doctors with foreign degrees practicing in Britain before 1858, she became the first woman to have her name entered on the General Medical Council's medical register (1 January 1859). She also became a mentor to Elizabeth Garrett Anderson during this time. By 1866, nearly 7,000 patients were being treated per year at the New York Infirmary, and Blackwell was needed back in the United States. The parallel project collapsed, but in 1868, a medical college for women adjunct to the infirmary was established. It incorporated Blackwell's innovative ideas about medical education – a four-year training period with much more extensive clinical training than previously required.

At this point, a rift occurred between Emily and Elizabeth Blackwell. Both were headstrong, and a conflict over the management of the infirmary and medical college ensued. Elizabeth, feeling slightly alienated by the United States women's medical movement, left for Britain to try to establish medical education for women there. In July 1869, she sailed for Britain.

In 1874, Blackwell established a women's medical school in London with Sophia Jex-Blake, who had been a student at the New York Infirmary years earlier. Blackwell had doubts about Jex-Blake and thought that she was dangerous, belligerent, and tactless. Nonetheless, Blackwell became deeply involved with the school, and it opened in 1874 as the London School of Medicine for Women, with the primary goal of preparing women for the licensing exam of Apothecaries Hall. Blackwell vehemently opposed the use of vivisections in the laboratory of the school.

After the establishment of the school, Blackwell lost much of her authority to Jex-Blake and was elected as a lecturer in midwifery. She resigned this position in 1877, officially retiring from her medical career.

While Blackwell viewed medicine as a means for social and moral reform, her student Mary Putnam Jacobi focused on curing disease. At a deeper level of disagreement, Blackwell felt that women would succeed in medicine because of their humane female values, but Jacobi believed that women should participate as the equals of men in all medical specialties.

=== Time in Europe – social and moral reform ===
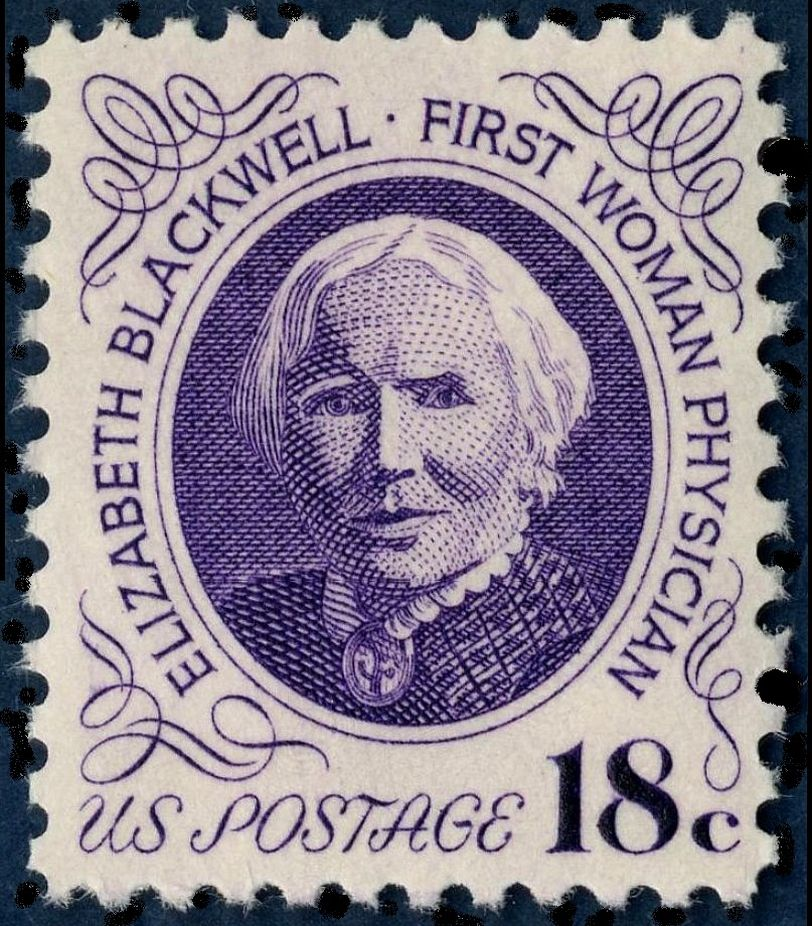
Blackwell was commemorated on a U.S. postage stamp in 1974, designed by Joseph Stanley Kozlowski. Syracuse University Medical School collection.

After moving to Britain in 1869, Blackwell diversified her interests, and was active both in social reform and authorship. She co-founded the National Health Society in 1871. She may have perceived herself as a wealthy gentlewoman who had the leisure to dabble in reform and in intellectual activities, being financially supported by the income from her American investments. Her friend, Barbara Bodichon helped introduce Blackwell into her circles. She traveled across Europe many times during these years, in England, France, Wales, Switzerland and Italy.

Blackwell was most active in social reform from 1880 to 1895, after her retirement from medicine. Blackwell was active in a number of reform movements, mainly moral reform, sexual purity, hygiene and medical education, but also preventive medicine, sanitation, eugenics, family planning, women's rights, associationism, Christian socialism, medical ethics and antivivisection. She switched back and forth between many different reform organisations, trying to maintain a position of power in each. Blackwell had a lofty and unattainable goal: evangelical moral perfection. All of her reform work was along this thread. She even contributed heavily to the founding of two utopian communities: Starnthwaite and Hadleigh in the 1880s.

Blackwell believed that the Christian morality ought to play as large a role as scientific inquiry in medicine and that medical schools ought to instruct students in the subject. She also was antimaterialist and did not believe in vivisections. She did not see the value of inoculation and thought it dangerous. She believed that bacteria were not the only important cause of disease and felt their importance was being exaggerated.

Blackwell campaigned heavily against licentiousness, prostitution and contraceptives, arguing instead for the rhythm method of birth control. She campaigned against the Contagious Diseases Acts, arguing that it was a pseudo-legalisation of prostitution. Her 1878 book Counsel to Parents on the Moral Education of their Children argued against the act. Blackwell was conservative in many ways, but believed women to have sexual libidos equal to those of men, and that men and women were equally responsible for controlling their sexual urges. Others of her time believed women to have little if any sexual passion, and placed the responsibility of moral policing squarely on the shoulders of the woman.

The book was controversial, being rejected by 12 publishers, before being printed by Hatchard and Company. The proofs for the original edition were destroyed by a member of the publisher's board and a change of title was required for a new edition to be printed.

== Personal life ==
=== Friends and family ===
Blackwell was well connected, both in the United States and in the United Kingdom. She exchanged letters with Lady Byron about women's rights issues and became very close friends with Florence Nightingale, with whom she discussed opening and running a hospital. She remained lifelong friends with Barbara Bodichon and met Elizabeth Cady Stanton in 1883. She was close with her family and visited her brothers and sisters whenever she could during her travels.

However, Blackwell had a very strong personality and was often quite acerbic in her criticism of others. Blackwell had an argument with Florence Nightingale after Nightingale returned from the Crimean War. Nightingale wanted Blackwell to turn her focus to training nurses and could not see the legitimacy of training female physicians. After that, Blackwell's comments upon Florence Nightingale's publications were often highly critical. She was also critical of many of the women's reform and hospital organisations in which she played no role, calling some of them "quack auspices". Blackwell also had strained relationships with her sisters Anna and Emily, and with the women physicians she mentored after they established themselves (Marie Zakrzewska, Sophia Jex-Blake and Elizabeth Garrett Anderson). Among women at least, Blackwell was very assertive and found it difficult to play a subordinate role.

=== Kitty Barry ===
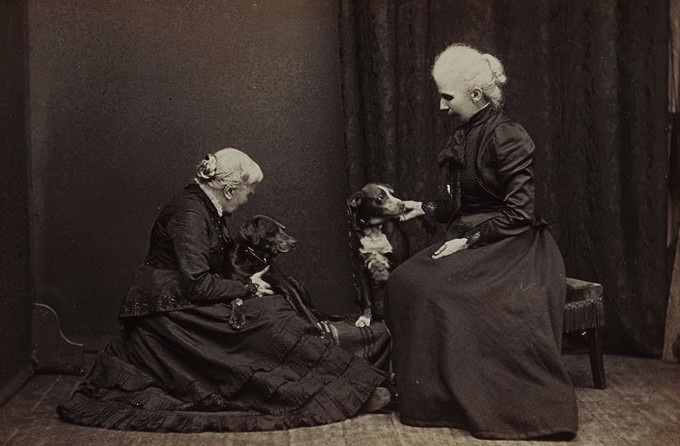
Photograph of an older Elizabeth Blackwell with her adopted daughter Kitty and two dogs, 1905

In 1856, when Blackwell was establishing the New York Infirmary, she adopted Katherine "Kitty" Barry (1848–1936), an Irish orphan from the House of Refuge on Randall's Island. Diary entries at the time indicate that she adopted Barry out of loneliness and a feeling of obligation, as well as out of a utilitarian need for domestic help. Barry was brought up as a half-servant, half-daughter.

Blackwell provided for Barry's education. She even instructed Barry in gymnastics as a trial for the theories outlined in her publication, The Laws of Life with Special Reference to the Physical Education of Girls. However, Blackwell never permitted Barry to develop her own interest and made no effort to introduce Barry to young men or women her own age. Barry herself was rather shy, awkward and self-conscious about her partial deafness. Barry followed Blackwell during her many trans-Atlantic moves, during her furious house hunt between 1874 and 1875, during which they moved six times, and finally to Blackwell's final home, Rock House, a small house off of Exmouth Place in Hastings, Sussex, in 1879.

Barry stayed with Blackwell all her life. After Blackwell's death, Barry stayed at Rock House before moving to Kilmun in Argyllshire, Scotland. In 1920, she moved in with the Blackwells and took the Blackwell name. On her deathbed, in 1936, Barry called Blackwell her "true love", and requested that her ashes be buried with those of Elizabeth.

=== Private life ===
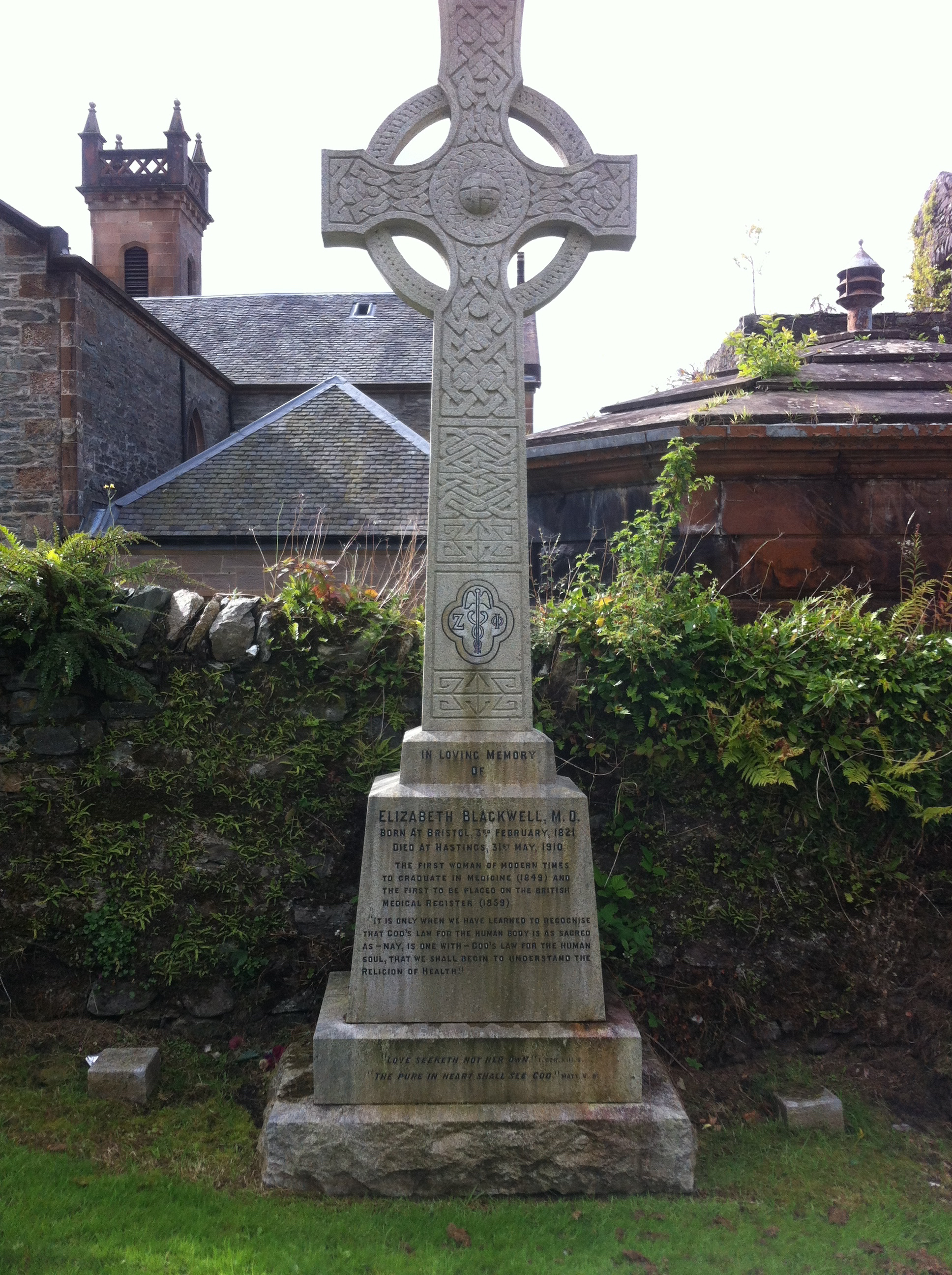
Blackwell's headstone at St Munn's Parish Church, Kilmun, Scotland

None of the five Blackwell sisters ever married. Elizabeth thought courtship games were foolish early in her life, and prized her independence. When commenting on young men trying to court her during her time in Kentucky, she said: "...do not imagine I am going to make myself a whole just at present; the fact is I cannot find my other half here, but only about a sixth, which would not do." During her time at Geneva Medical College, she also rejected advances from a few suitors.

There was one slight controversy, however, in Blackwell's life related to her relationship with Alfred Sachs, a 26-year-old man from Virginia. He was very close with both Kitty Barry and Blackwell, and it was widely believed in 1876 that he was a suitor for Barry, who was 29 at the time. The reality was that Blackwell and Sachs were very close, so much so that Barry felt uncomfortable being around the two of them. Sachs was very interested in Blackwell, then 55 years old. Barry was reportedly in love with Sachs and was mildly jealous of Blackwell. Blackwell thought that Sachs lived a life of dissipation and believed that she could reform him. In fact, the majority of her 1878 publication Counsel to Parents on the Moral Education of the Children was based on her conversations with Sachs. Blackwell stopped correspondence with Sachs after the publication of her book.

=== Last years and death ===
In her later life, Blackwell was still relatively active. In 1895, she published her autobiography, Pioneer Work in Opening the Medical Profession to Women. It sold fewer than 500 copies. After this publication, Blackwell gradually retreated from public life and spent more time traveling. In 1906, she visited the United States, where she took her first and last car ride.

In 1907, while holidaying in Kilmun, Scotland, Blackwell fell down a flight of stairs, and was left almost completely mentally and physically disabled. On 31 May 1910, she died at her home in Hastings after suffering a stroke that paralyzed half her body. Her ashes were buried in the graveyard of St Munn's Parish Church in Kilmun and obituaries honouring her appeared in publications such as The Lancet and The British Medical Journal.

== Legacy ==
The British artist Edith Holden, whose Unitarian family were Blackwell's relatives, was given the middle name "Blackwell" in her honor.

=== Influence ===
After Blackwell graduated in 1849, her thesis on typhoid fever was published in the Buffalo Medical Journal and Monthly Review.

In 1857, Blackwell opened the New York Infirmary for Women with her younger sister Emily. At the same time, she gave lectures to women in the United States and England about the importance of educating women and the profession of medicine for women. In the audience at one of her lectures in England, was a woman named Elizabeth Garrett Anderson, who later became the first woman doctor in England, in 1865.

In 1874, Blackwell worked together with Florence Nightingale, Sophia Jex-Blake, Elizabeth Garrett Anderson, Emily Blackwell, and Thomas Henry Huxley to create the first medical school for women in England, London School of Medicine for Women, for which she acted as the Chair of Hygiene.

Blackwell settled in England in the 1870s and continued working on expanding the profession of medicine for women, influencing as many as 476 women to become registered medical professionals in England alone. Up until her death, Blackwell worked in an active practice in Hastings, England, and continued to lecture at the School of Medicine for Women.

=== Honors ===
Two institutions honour Elizabeth Blackwell as an alumna:

- Hobart and William Smith Colleges, the current name of Geneva College, the founding institution of Geneva Medical College.
- The State University of New York Upstate Medical University, which took over Geneva Medical College in 1871 and was acquired in 1950 by the State University of New York

Since 1949, the American Medical Women's Association has awarded the Elizabeth Blackwell Medal annually to a female physician. Hobart and William Smith Colleges awards an annual Elizabeth Blackwell Award to women who have demonstrated "outstanding service to humankind."

In 1973, Elizabeth Blackwell was inducted into the National Women's Hall of Fame.

The artwork The Dinner Party features a place setting for Elizabeth Blackwell.

In 2013 the University of Bristol launched the Elizabeth Blackwell Institute for Health Research.

On 3 February 2016, National Women Physicians Day was declared a National Holiday championed by Physician Moms Group after publishing a study in JAMA exposing that the majority of women physicians report still facing discrimination due to their gender and/or being a mother. The National Holiday pays tribute to Blackwell for the role she has played influencing women physicians in the present-day and their strivings for equity and equality.

On 3 February 2018, Google honoured her as a doodle in recognition of her 197th birth anniversary.

In May 2018, a commemorative plaque was unveiled at the former location of the New York Infirmary for Indigent Women and Children, which Elizabeth Blackwell and her sister Emily Blackwell founded. For the event, Jill Platner, a jewelry designer, designed a Blackwell Collection of jewelry inspired by Elizabeth Blackwell.

Hobart and William Smith Colleges erected a statue on their campus honoring Blackwell.

A 2021 book by Janice P. Nimura, The Doctors Blackwell, chronicles the life story of Elizabeth Blackwell and her sister Emily Blackwell.

Poet Jessy Randall's interest in Blackwell was the original inspiration for what became her 2022 collection of poems about women scientists, Mathematics for Ladies.

In 2025, SUNY Upstate Medical University erected a statue of Elizabeth Blackwell on its campus to celebrate her trailblazing career.

A ceramic bust of Blackwell, along with a plaque, was unveiled in Asheville in 1994, with the rest of the monument added in 1999.

=== Works ===
- 1849 The Causes and Treatment of Typhus, or Shipfever (thesis)
- 1852 The Laws of Life with Special Reference to the Physical Education of Girls (brochure, compilation of lecture series) pub. by George Putnam
- 1856 An appeal in behalf of the medical education of women
- 1860 Medicine as a Profession for Women (lecture published by the trustees of the New York Infirmary for Women)
- 1864 Address on the Medical Education of Women
- 1878 Counsel to Parents on the Moral Education of their Children in Relation to Sex (eight editions, republished as The Moral Education of the Young in Relation to Sex)
- 1881 "Medicine and Morality" (published in Modern Review)
- 1887 Purchase of Women: the Great Economic Blunder
- 1871 The Religion of Health (compilation of lecture series to the Sunday Lecture Society, three editions)
- 1883 Wrong and Right Methods of Dealing with Social Evil, as shown by English Parliamentary Evidence
- 1888 On the Decay of Municipal Representative Government – A Chapter of Personal Experience (Moral Reform League)
- 1890 The Influence of Women in the Profession of Medicine
- 1891 Erroneous Method in Medical Education etc. (Women's Printing Society)
- 1892 Why Hygienic Congresses Fail
- 1895 Pioneer Work in Opening the Medical Profession to Women – Autobiographical Sketches (Longmans, reprinted New York: Schocken Books, 1977)
- 1898 Scientific Method in Biology
- 1902 Essays in Medical Sociology, 2 vols (Ernest Bell)

== See also ==
- James Barry, possibly the first female bodied doctor (assigned female at birth but living as a man)
- List of first female physicians by country
- Rebecca Lee Crumpler, first African American female physician
