= Universal law =

Concepts which are universally accepted to be most legitimate

In law and ethics, universal justice or universal principle refers to concepts of legal legitimacy actions, whereby those principles and rules for governing human beings' conduct which are most universal in their acceptability, their applicability, translation, and philosophical basis, are therefore considered to be most legitimate.

== Debate ==
Cognition, experiences and intuition are the starting points of legal thought, which has to be seen through the glasses of universality and abstractness. Notwithstanding this assumption, "legal principles 1) do not contain only logic and reason and that 2) they can be different in different situations despite their equal naming. The legal rules can be identical in different legal orders while they carry different wants".

On one side "universality, abstraction, and theory itself are defined in a way that undermines the perspectives of some while privileging the perspectives of others"; on the other side, "the aspiration to universality itself may stand in the way of its realization if it seals off from view the bias built into legal norms, public practices, and established institutions".

== See also ==
- Human rights
- Natural law
- Pragmatic theory of truth
- Universal value
- Universality (philosophy)
