= Joseph S. Kozlowski =

American painter

Joseph Stanley Kozlowski (1912–1992), American portrait and watercolor artist, was born in Frankfort, New York. The family later owned a farm in Clinton, New York and Kozlowski attended Clinton High School. He graduated from Syracuse University in 1936 with a BFA degree. In 1938 he was appointed chief artist and photographer with the Poole-Crockett archaeological expedition to study the Mayan ruins in the Yucatán Peninsula undertaken by Syracuse University. He returned to Yucatán in 1940 for a period of 8 months, using his paintings as barter for food and accommodations.

Following the outbreak of the Second World War, Kozlowski joined the Merchant Marine and served as an able-bodied seaman (AB) shipping war material from New Orleans, Louisiana and Corpus Christi, Texas through the Panama Canal to Honolulu, Hawaii and, as he was fond of saying, "boat loads of post holes" on the return trip. Between ships he worked as a civilian photographer with the Army Air Corps at both Hickam Field, as it was called during the war, in Hawaii and at the Rome Air Depot in Rome, New York, currently called Griffiss Air Force Base.

From 1946 to 1949 he was a photography and art instructor at the Veterans Administration Hospital and rehabilitation facility in Bath, New York.

Settling in the East Syracuse, New York area in 1950, he was frequently commissioned by various organizations affiliated with Syracuse University and the State University of New York to paint portraits of notable members of the teaching staff for their institutional collections. He also worked as a technical illustrator for the Prosperity Company and later freelancing in that capacity. He eventually obtained teaching credentials and taught art in the East Syracuse-Minoa Central School District until he retired in the late 1970s.

Commissioned portraits were most often signed "J.S. Kozlowski", generally in bold block letters. Other works, regardless of medium, were rarely signed or dated.

== Known paintings ==
These lists are incomplete. Any additions or information regarding these or other paintings by the artist would be appreciated.

=== Portraits ===
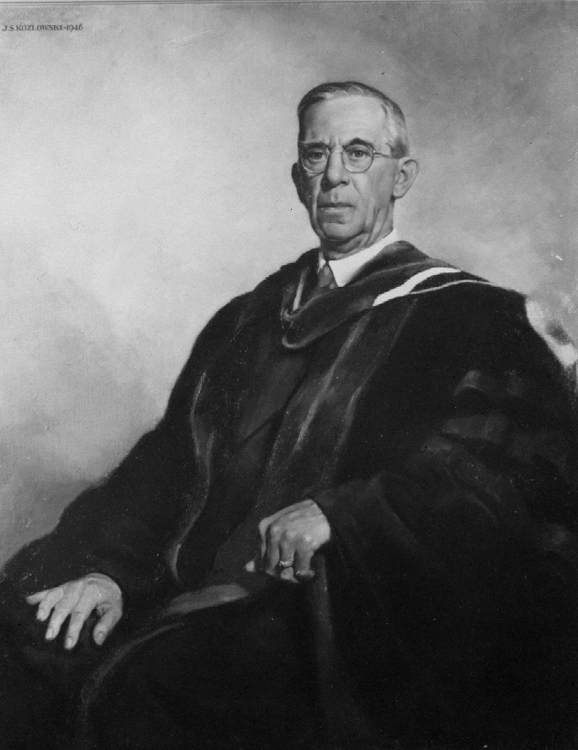
Portrait of Dean H.G. Weiscotten by Joseph S. Kozlowski, 1946. Syracuse University Medical School collection.

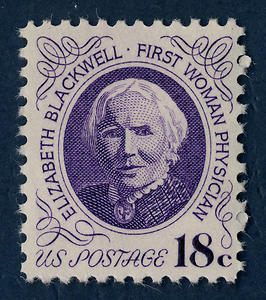
Elizabeth Blackwell $0.18 USPS stamp.

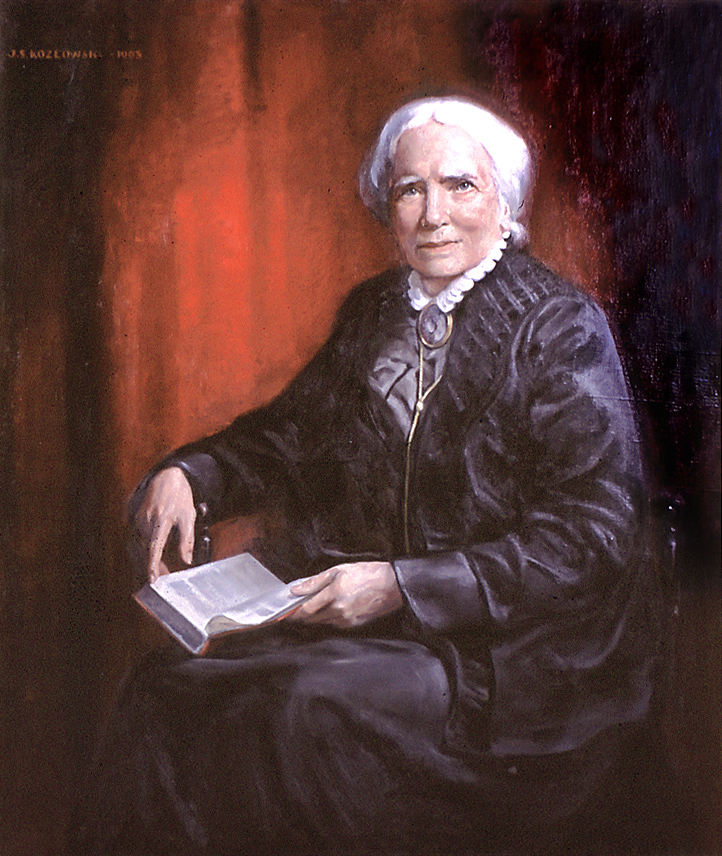
Portrait of Elizabeth Blackwell, 1905. Syracuse University Medical School collection.

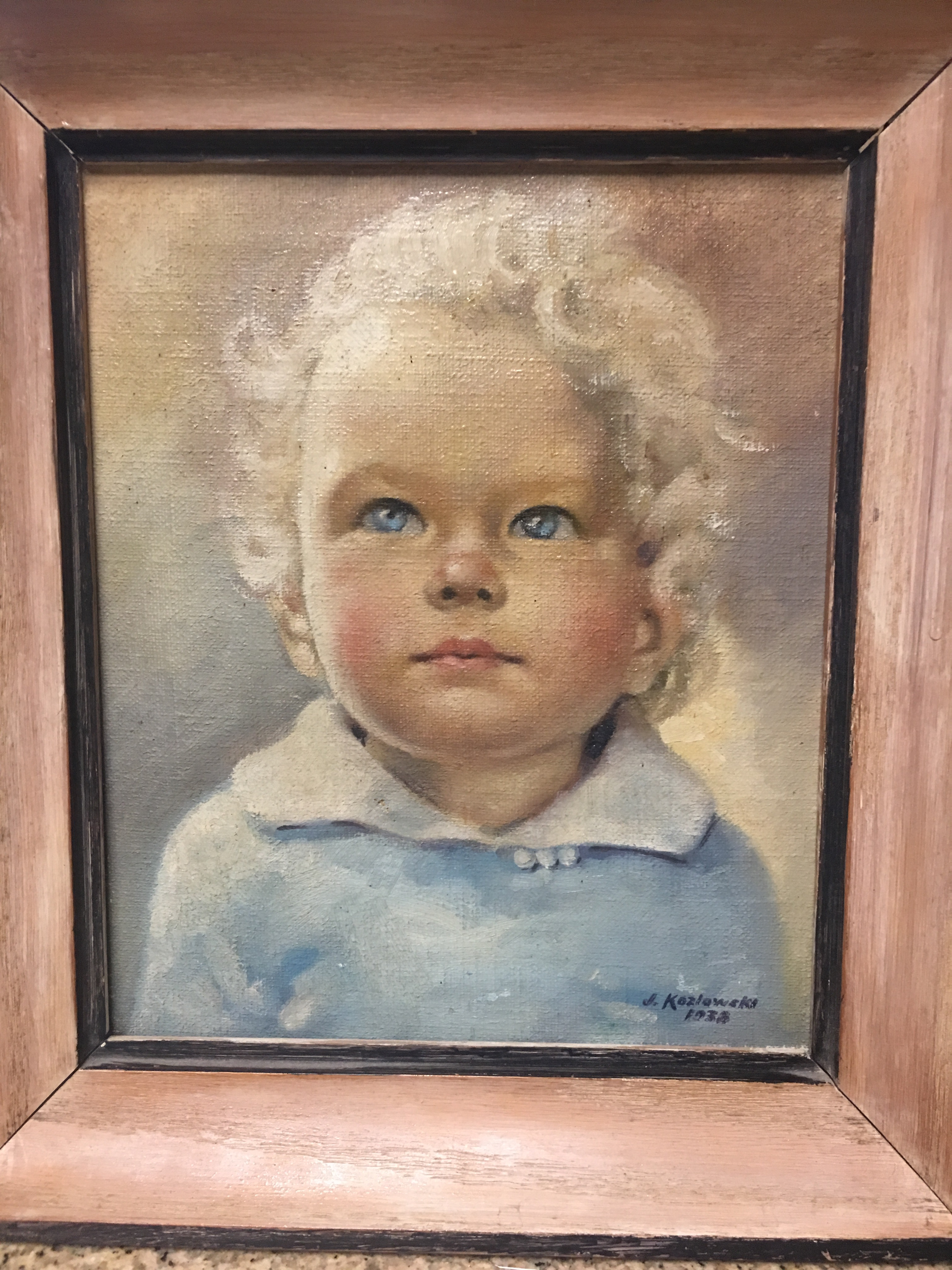
Portrait of Yvonne Holman, 1938

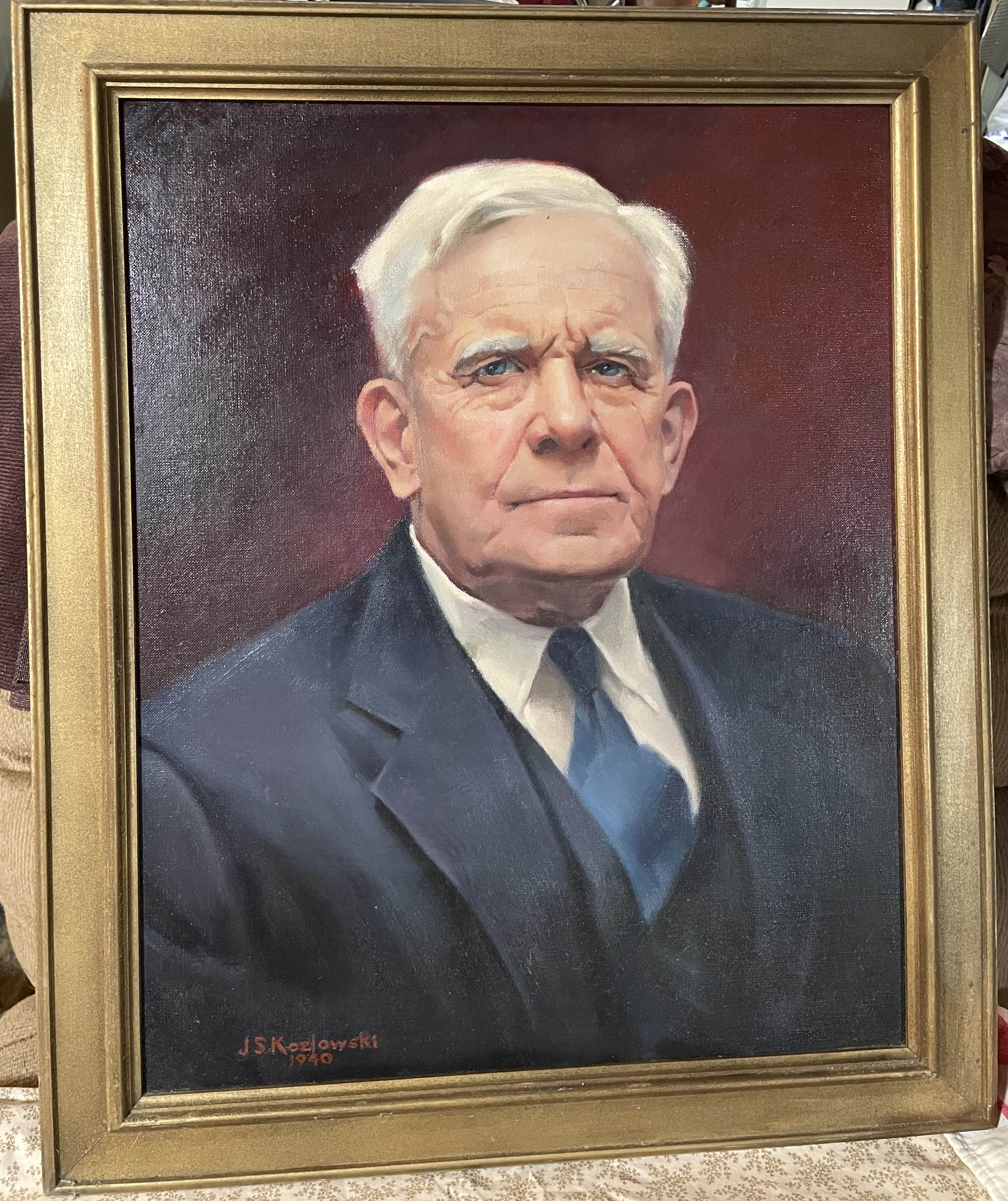
Portrait of Professor William J Davison, 1940.

- Yvonne Holman, (1938) (Private collection)
- Lucie Holman, (1938) (Private collection)
- Self Portrait, (1940) (Private collection)
- Dr. W.M. Smallwood, (1940) Syracuse University, College of Liberal Arts
- Portrait of Mary, (1940) (Private collection)
- Professor William J. Davison, (1940). Verso: "Professor of Physical Education and Wrestling Coach at Syracuse University, Died March 1941. Painted by Joseph S. Kozlowski" (Private Collection)
- Captain Stillwell - U.S. Merchant Marine (1945) (Private collection)
- Dean H. G. Weiscotten, Syracuse University Medical School (1946)
- Professor Emeritus Edward C. Reifenstein Sr, (1946) Upstate Medical University, Syracuse, New York.
- Portrait of Leopold L. Joh the V (1947) (Private Collection)
- Dean William L. Bray, SUNY College of Forestry (1953)
- Professor W.J. Davidson, Syracuse University, Athletic Department
- Doctor Knowlton, Syracuse University, College of Medicine
- Joe Kozlowski, Jr. in high school cap and gown, (1963) (Private collection)
- Joe Kozlowski, Jr., (1964) (Private collection)
- Professor Emeritus Gordon D. Hoople, (1964) Upstate Medical University, Syracuse, New York.
- Professor Carlyle Ferdinand Jacobsen, Ph.D. (1967)
- T. Aaron Levy, Syracuse Museum of Fine Arts (later to become the Everson Museum of Art), Syracuse, New York
- Portrait of Coach Bill Metz, (1971). Physical Education Teacher, Football Coach, and Athletic Director at East Syracuse-Minoa Central School District. (Private collection).
- Dan A. Richert Ph. D., (1973), Upstate Medical University, Syracuse, New York.
- Dorothy Ward, East Syracuse Schools (later East Syracuse-Minoa Central School District); (private collection)
- Lt. Col. Peter Voninski (USAF), (private collection)
- Dr. George Heitzman; (private collection)
- Dr. Justice Meuller, Syracuse University Medical School
- Elizabeth Blackwell, Syracuse University Upstate Medical Center. The Elizabeth Blackwell painting was used as source material for a USPS $.18 postage stamp. However, credit was not extended by the USPS for some time after the issuance of the stamp. After a full investigation determined that Kozlowski's painting was, in fact, the original source for the stamp design the USPS tightened its rules regarding the documentation of source materials in order for design acceptance and acknowledged the role of the painting in the design process.

=== Landscape and still life ===
- Characters in a Bar-room; Oil on canvas (1936) (Private collection / Australia)
- Night Skyline, Chicago; Oil on masonite, (~1938-39) (Private collection)

Tulum, painting by Joseph S. Kozlowski, 1940.

- Tulum; Oil on canvas, (1940) (Private collection)
- Temple of the Dwarf, Uxmal; Oil on canvas, (1940) (Private collection)
- Cohoctan Valley; Watercolor (~1948) (Private collection)
- Farmers Bounty; Oil on canvas (1949) (Private collection)
- Erie Canal Aqueduct; Watercolor, (196x) (Private collection)
- A series of three watercolors with basically the same composition, decanter and background. They were given as gifts to Kozlowski's son and two of his son's friends in 1981:
  - Still Life with Red Onions; Watercolor (196x-1970x) (Private collection)
  - Still life with Oranges; Watercolor (196x-1970x) (Private collection)
  - Still life with Lemons; Watercolor (196x-1970x) (Private collection)
- Wine and Apples; Oil on paperboard (1972) (Private collection)
- Red Peppers; Watercolor (1979) (Private collection)
