= Antimaterialism =

In philosophy, antimaterialism is any of several metaphysical or religious beliefs that are specifically opposed to materialism, the notion that only matter exists. These beliefs include:

- Immaterialism, a philosophy branching from George Berkeley of which his idealism is a type
- Dualism (philosophy of mind), a philosophy which includes the claim that mental phenomena are, in some respects, non-physical
- Gnosticism, a general class of religious movements which hold that human beings have divine souls trapped in a material world
- Idealism, which holds that the ultimate nature of reality is based on mind or ideas
- Maya (illusion), a concept in various Indian religions regarding the dualism of the Universe
- Platonic realism, which holds that certain universals have a real existence, in the sense of philosophical realism
- Supernaturalism
- Transcendentalism, a group of ideas involving an ideal spiritual state that 'transcends' the physical and empirical realms
