= NewYork-Presbyterian Lower Manhattan Hospital =

Hospital in Manhattan, New York, U.S.

New York-Presbyterian Lower Manhattan Hospital
- NewYork–Presbyterian Healthcare System

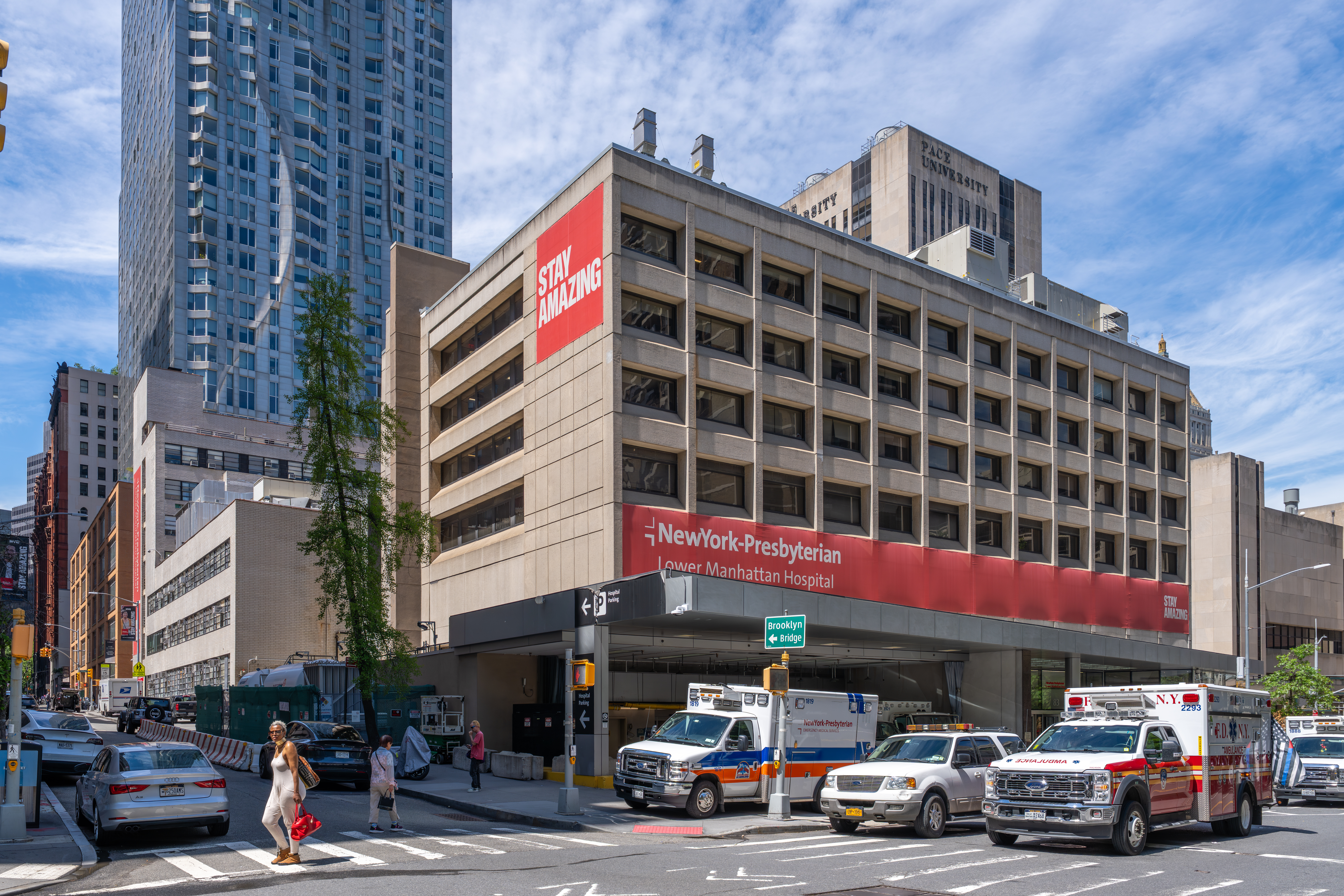
- 2026

Geography
- Location: South of Greenwich Village 170 William St., Manhattan, New York, United States
- Coordinates: 40°42′37″N 74°0′18″W

Organization
- Care system: Private
- Type: Teaching
- Affiliated university: Weill Cornell Medical College
- Network: NewYork–Presbyterian Hospital

Services
- Emergency department: Yes
- Beds: 180
- Speciality: Teaching

History
- Former names: New York Dispensary for Poor Women and Children; New York Infirmary for Indigent Women and Children; Beekman Downtown Hospital; New York Infirmary-Beekman Downtown Hospital; NYU Downtown Hospital; New York Downtown Hospital
- Constructed: 1981 In current location
- Founded: 1853 (New York Dispensary for Poor Women & Children); 2013 (became a campus of NewYork–Presbyterian)

Links
- Website: nyp.org/lowermanhattan
- Lists: Hospitals in New York State
- Other links: Hospitals in Manhattan

New York-Presbyterian Lower Manhattan Hospital is a nonprofit, acute care, teaching hospital in New York City and is the only hospital in Lower Manhattan south of Greenwich Village. It is part of the New York-Presbyterian Healthcare System and one of the main campuses of New York-Presbyterian Hospital.

The Lower Manhattan Hospital operates 180 beds and offers a full range of inpatient and outpatient services, as well as community outreach and education. It is a leader in the field of emergency preparedness and disaster management. The Hospital houses numerous medical and surgical subspecialties with out-patient offices in both the 170 William St and 156 William St buildings. The Hospital serves the area's diverse neighborhoods including Wall Street, Battery Park City, Chinatown, SoHo, TriBeCa, Little Italy, and the Lower East Side. It is the closest acute care facility to the Financial District, to the seat of the City government, and for some of New York's most popular tourist attractions.

== History ==
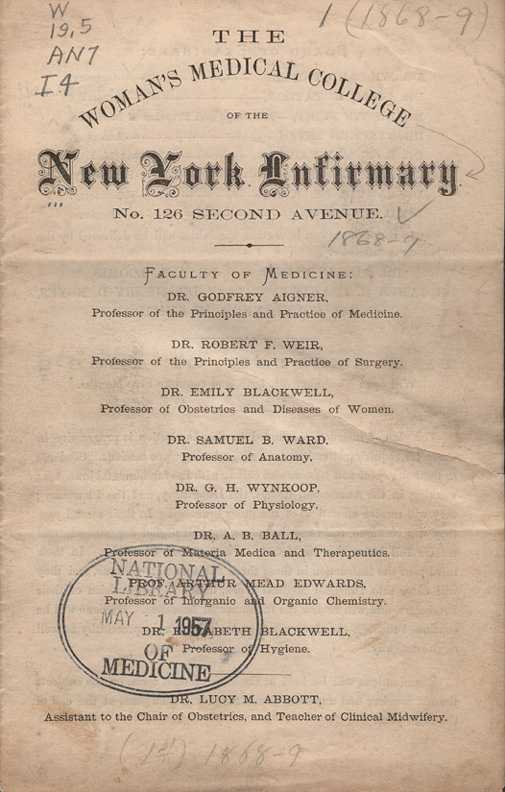
1868 announcement of The Woman's Medical College of the New York Infirmary.

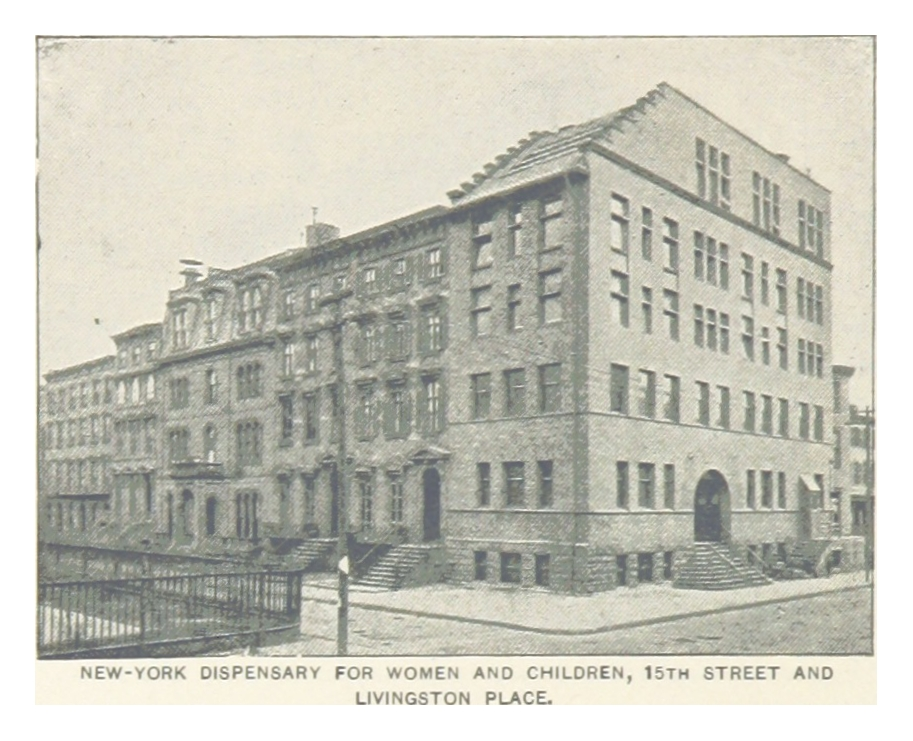
The hospital in 1893

The name and location of the hospital have gone through several changes since Elizabeth Blackwell founded the New York Dispensary for Poor Women and Children in 1853. In 1857 she opened the hospital under the name of New York Infirmary for Indigent Women and Children at East 7th Street near the present day Tompkins Square Park. As the hospital required more space it moved in 1858 to Stuyvesant Square. One of the hospital's administrators, Anne Daniel, who headed the hospital from about 1894 to 1944 wrote a history of the hospital in the 1930s, entitled ′A cautious experiment.′ The history of the New York Infirmary for Women and Children and the Woman's Medical College of the New York Infirmary, which was serialized in the Medical Woman’s Journal (46) between May 1939 and December 1939. Finally in 1981, merging with the Beekman Downtown Hospital, it relocated to its present site in Lower Manhattan under the name of New York Infirmary-Beekman Downtown Hospital.

In 1929 Narcissa Cox Vanderlip became the president of the hospital, a position she held for thirty-seven years.

In 1991, the hospital was renamed New York Downtown Hospital. In 1997, after three years of affiliation with NYU Medical Center, the name was changed to NYU Downtown Hospital. In 2005 the affiliation with the NYU Medical Center ceased and the hospital reverted to the name New York Downtown Hospital. Following a full merger in 2013 with New York-Presbyterian Hospital, it was renamed New York-Presbyterian Lower Manhattan Hospital.

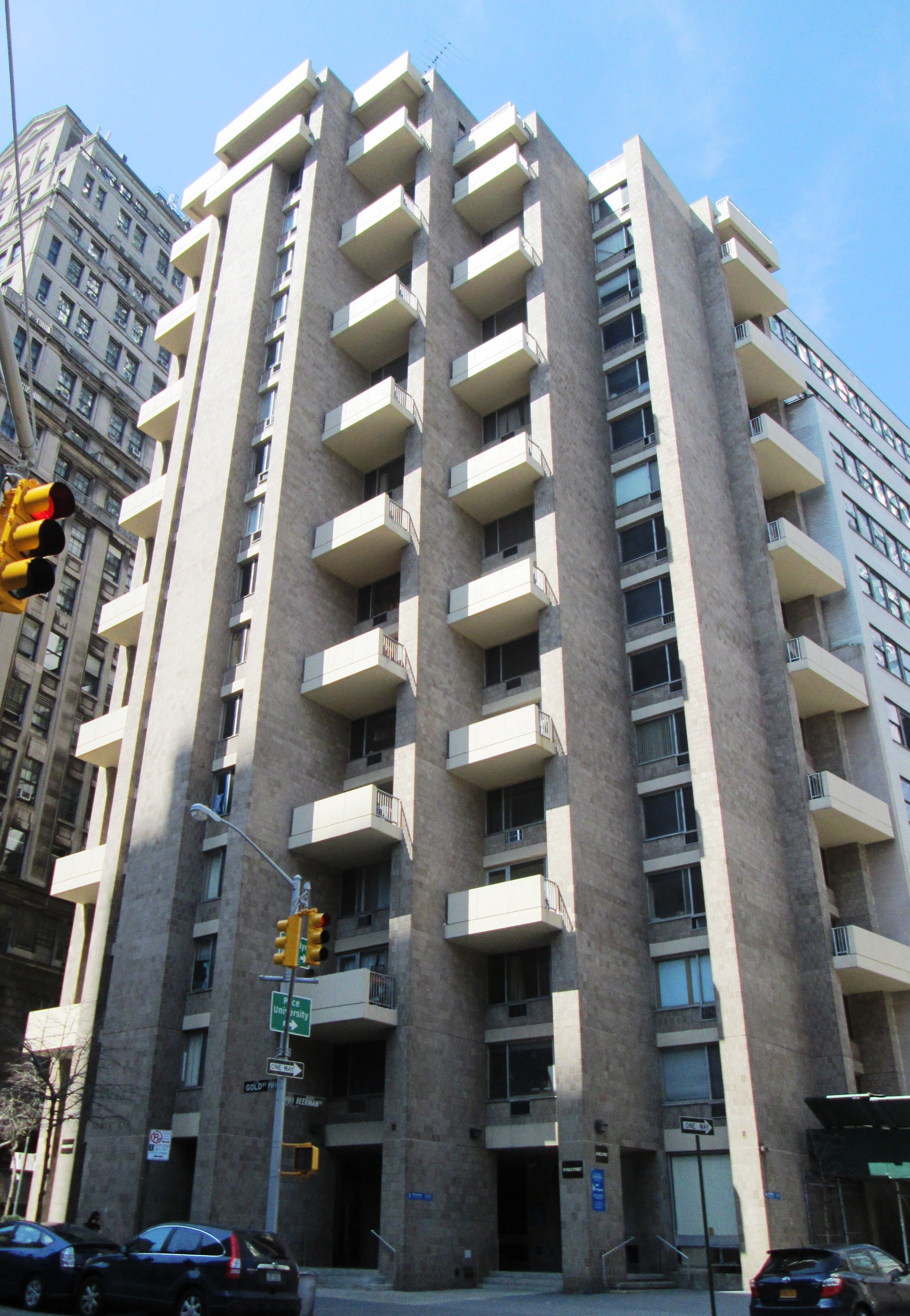
Staff residence building

In 2005 the hospital discharged nearly 12,000 inpatients. The hospital, an affiliate of Weill Cornell Medical College, provides approximately 100,000 outpatient visits and 6,000 surgical procedures annually. In addition, as Lower Manhattan’s only emergency department, the hospital treats 32,000 patients annually in its emergency department and provides more than 5,000 ambulance transports.

In 2006 the hospital introduced a new decontamination unit built as part of the $25 million Lehman Brothers Emergency Room. The project was begun after the terrorist attacks of September 11, 2001, when the hospital treated about 1,500 victims. Before the construction of the new facility, the hospital's small decontamination unit could handle about 20 patients an hour. The new unit can treat between 500 and 1,000 patients an hour. The design is based on the decontamination unit at Shaare Zedek Medical Center in Jerusalem.

In May 2018, a commemorative plaque was unveiled at the former location of the New York Infirmary for Indigent Women and Children.

Now in 2023 the hospital is the only one in lower Manhattan and has provided care to more than 130,000 patient visits. The hospital also started a new program where a person can visit digitally for patients with a less severe issue to make the process go faster than if they showed up to the emergency room.

== Designations ==
- Primary Stroke Center
- Level II Perinatal Center
