= Laura M. Plantz =

- Laura Marion Wheeler Fairchild Wheaton Plantz
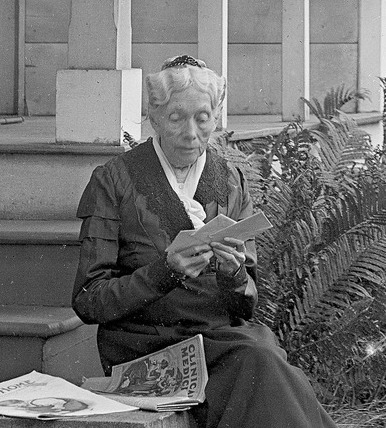
- Born: May 8, 1829; Lyndon
- Died: May 24, 1923 (aged 94); Columbus
- Alma mater: Penn Medical University
- Occupation: Medical doctor
- Spouse(s): Tobias A. Plants

Laura Marion Wheeler Fairchild Wheaton Plantz (May 8, 1829 – May 24, 1923) was an American physician and anti-suffrage activist. She was the first woman to practice medicine in three US states, Minnesota, Michigan, and Vermont.

She was born Laura Marion Wheeler was born on May 8, 1829 in Lyndon, Vermont, the daughter of Nelson Wheeler, a blacksmith and wagon maker, and Bersheba Moore. When she was ten, her family moved to Putney, Vermont, where she would later return and live the last decades of her life. She was educated at West Brattleboro Academy and worked as a teacher in Vermont, Rhode Island and Illinois. In 1853, she married New Haven, Connecticut merchant William Fairchild, but he died in 1855. After briefly working as a mill worker in Lowell, Massachusetts, she attended New England Female Medical College starting in 1856, then transferred to Penn Medical University, where she graduated in 1860.

After graduation, she practiced medicine in Putney in 1862. She worked as a physician with a number of charitable institutions in New York and was responsible for training a cadre of nurses to serve during the American Civil War. After the war, she began practicing medicine in Rushford, Minnesota. She married Col. William Wheaton, a civil engineer and father of General Loyd Wheaton. The couple relocated to Kalamazoo, Michigan where she practiced medicine for eleven years and gave birth to her only child, Walter G. Wheaton, in 1866.

In 1870, she was an active campaigner and lecturer against women's suffrage in Michigan and Illinois. Two regular lectures she delivered were titled "The Perils of the Hour" and "The True Woman". In 1875, the couple relocated to San Francisco, where Col. Wheaton died. She returned to Kalamazoo and in 1876 married politician Tobias Avery Plantz. They lived in Pomeroy, Ohio, where he died in 1887.

After travelling for some time, Dr. Plantz returned to Putney in 1891, where she lived most of the rest of her life. She built a large house on Depot Street which now has a historical marker. She practiced medicine in Putney into her 90s. In 1900, she attracted national attention after a tongue-in-cheek announcement that she would campaign to be Vice President of the United States on the ticket of Admiral George Dewey.

In 1921, she moved to Columbus, Ohio to live with her son. After a broken hip, she died there at the age of 94.
