= Helen Morton (physician) =

American physician

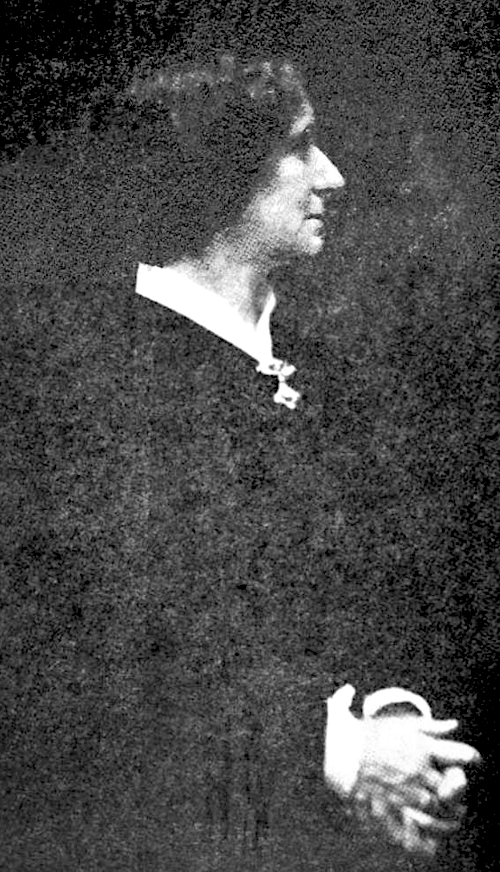
- Helen Morton, from a 1918 publication
- Born: September 27, 1834; Plymouth, Massachusetts
- Died: March 22, 1916 (age 81); Boston, Massachusetts
- Occupation: Physician

Helen Morton (September 27, 1834 – March 22, 1916) was an American obstetrician, one of the early generation of women physicians practicing in Boston in the nineteenth century.

== Early life and education ==
Morton was born in Plymouth, Massachusetts, the daughter of Edwin Morton and Betsy Torrey Harlow Morton. Her parents were also born in Plymouth. Her father was known for being a philanthropist, humanitarian, being an advocate of "Education for all people," and his advanced ideals. She was descended from Puritan leader George Morton, and through that connection was related to many prominent New Englanders. She attended Antioch College and the Woman's Medical College of Pennsylvania, then completed her medical degree at the New England Female Medical College in 1862. She had further training in obstetrics in Paris.

== Career ==
Morton entered the Lying-in Hospital of Paris, Lá Maternité, and after two years she graduated with the highest prizes. She then passed an examination in front of doctors and surgeons of Paris with highest distinction. Due to this, she was asked to take on the position as assistant director where she spent two years as director of an obstetric hospital in Paris in the 1860s. She was awarded a medal by the French government in 1864. She returned to Boston and was an attending physician at the New England Hospital for Women and Children, in charge of maternity services, for at least twenty years. She was close colleagues with Maria Zakrzewska, Ednah D. Cheney, Susan Dimock, and Lucy E. Sewall, among other women physicians working in Boston in her time. A wing of the hospital building was constructed with money given by her and carries on her name.

Morton was a member of the American Forestry Association, and a supporter of the Boston Music School Settlement. She donated several subscriptions of periodicals, including American Journal of Archaeology and Forestry and Irrigation, to the Plymouth Public Library. She was also active in the Boston Young Women's Christian Association, and a subscribing member of the Women's Educational and Industrial Union.

== Personal life and legacy ==
In the 1890s, Morton lived with another obstetrician, Mary Forrester Hobart, in Boston. Hobart was the great-great-granddaughter of Maine midwife and diarist Martha Ballard. Morton had severe arthritis that kept her from working in her later years and she was confined to her bed because of locked joints. In 1906, the Helen Morton Wing of Sewall Maternity Hospital was named in her honor. She died in 1915, at the age of 81, in Boston. In her memory, her family donated an ambulance to the American Women's Hospitals Service in France during World War I.
