= Buckel =

Buckel is a surname. Notable people with the surname include:

- C. Annette Buckel (1833–1912), American physician
- David Buckel (1957–2018), American lawyer
- Jason C. Buckel (born 1971), American politician
- Ursula Buckel (1926–2005), German soprano singer
