= Seraph Frissell =

American physician and medical writer

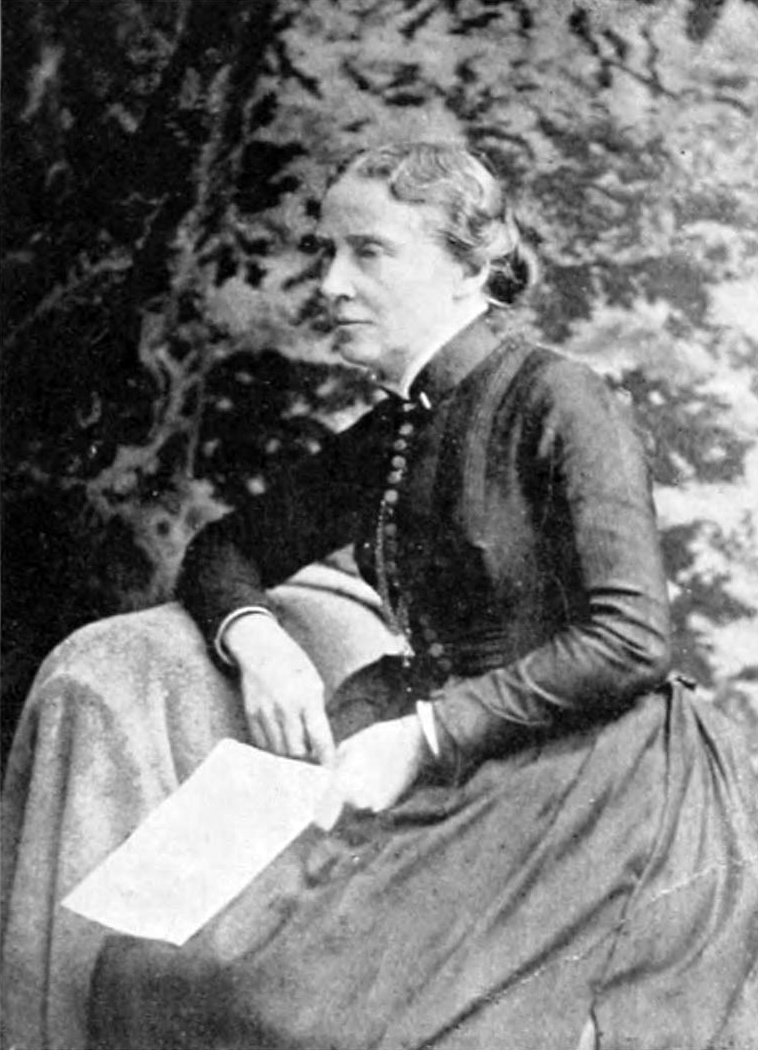
- Photo in A Woman of the Century
- Born: August 20, 1840; Peru, Massachusetts, U.S.
- Died: 1915
- Education: Mount Holyoke Seminary, University of Michigan
- Occupation: physician
- Relatives: Nathanael Emmons
- Medical career
- Field: diseases of women and children
- Institutions: Mount Holyoke Seminary

Seraph Frissell (August 20, 1840 – 1915) was an American physician and medical writer who specialized in diseases of women and children. She was the first woman in Western Massachusetts to be admitted to any district medical society, and the fourth woman to be admitted a member of the Massachusetts Medical Society. Women were first admitted to medical societies in Massachusetts in 1884; but the Berkshire District Medical Society made Frissell an honorary member in 1877, and she attended its monthly meetings, receiving notices as a regular member.

== Early life and education ==
=== Birth and ancestry ===
Seraph Frissell was born in Peru, Massachusetts, on August 20, 1840, the daughter of Augustus Caæsar and Laura Mack (Emmons) Frissell. Her grandparents were Thomas and Hannah (Phillips) Frissell; and Ichabod and Mindwell (Mack) Emmons. Her father and her paternal grandfather had both served as captains in the state militia. William Frissell, her great-grandfather, was a commissioned officer in the Revolutionary War, and a pioneer settler in western Massachusetts. Her mother's father, Ichabod Emmons, was a relative of Nathanael Emmons, and was one of the first settlers of Hinsdale, Massachusetts. Her grandfather. David Mack, was the second settler to make a clearing in the town of Middlefield, Massachusetts, then a wilderness, going to that locality in 1775, and was one of the founders of the town. He enlisted (from Hebron, Connecticut) in the Revolutionary War, but saw no active service, arriving too late to take part in the Battle of Saratoga. He was a Captain of troops engaged in suppressing Shays' Rebellion, and afterward was Colonel of a regiment.

=== Childhood ===
The first eleven years of Frissell's life were spent within sight of Saddleback Mountain. As a child she was reportedly quiet and diffident, not mingling freely with her schoolmates, and with a deep reverence for religious things. Frissell's father died when she was eleven years old, leaving her mother financially responsible for herself and six children, Seraph being the third. At the age of twelve, Frissell was sent to live with an aunt for a year in western New York, during which time she derided she would rather earn her own living, if possible, than be dependent on relatives. Returning home, the next year and a half were devoted to school life and helping a neighbor in household work, thereby earning necessary clothing. When she was fifteen, her oldest sister decided to seek employment in a woolen mill, and Seraph accompanied her.

=== Education ===
The next six years were divided between a factory girl's life and school life. During those years she earned her living and, besides contributing a certain amount for benevolent and missionary purposes, saved enough for one year's expenses in Mount Holyoke Seminary. In the fall of 1861, she enrolled in the Seminary, where she remained for one year. Then followed one year of teaching, and a second year in the seminary. After four years more of teaching, in the fall of 1868 she resumed her studies and graduated in July, 1869, having completed the four years' course in three years, in the meanwhile teaching for five years.

In 1867, Frissell received from the American Board of Missions the appointment of missionary to Ceylon, but in deference to her mother's wishes, she did not embark upon the mission. The following three years were spent in teaching, during which time the question of taking up the study of medicine was often considered. She began the study of medicine in 1872, in the medical department of the University of Michigan. She received her diploma from the Department of Medicine and Surgery of the University of Michigan on March 24, 1875, having had hospital practice in Detroit, Ypsilanti, and Boston.

== Career ==
In the spring of 1875, Frissell attended clinics in New York City. Her hospital practice included four months at the Woman's Hospital, Detroit; eleven months, beginning in June 1875 at the New England Hospital, Boston, Massachusetts, for hospital and dispensary work; and six months at Doctors Ruth Gerry and Cynthia Smith's Private Hospital, of Ypsilanti, Michigan.

In September, 1876, Frissell opened her medical practice in Pittsfield, Massachusetts, where she worked for eight years. In 1884, she moved to Springfield, Massachusetts, where she lived for the rest of her life. During the school years of 1890 and 1891, she was the physician at Mount Holyoke College, keeping her office practice in Springfield.

In 1896, Frissell took a course in electrotherapeutics. For some time, she was medical examiner for the Berkshire Life Insurance Company. In 1890 and 1891, she was resident physician and lecturer on physiology and hygiene at Mount Holyoke College. Her specialty was diseases of women and children. A part of her professional success she attributed to not prescribing alcoholic stimulants.

Frissell became a member of the Hampden County Medical Society in 1885, being the first woman in Western Massachusetts to be admitted to any district medical society, the law to admit women having been passed in 1884. She was a regular member of the Berkshire, Bennington, Rennsalaer, and Washington County Medical Society from its organization until she left Berkshire county. She was the fourth woman to be admitted a member of the Massachusetts Medical Society. She was an honorary member of the Alumna' Association of the Woman's Medical College, Philadelphia; a member of the Mercy Warren Chapter, Daughters of the American Revolution; of E.K. Wilcox Relief Corps; of the American Medical Association; of the Springfield Mount Holyoke Alumna' Association; of the Alumna Association of the University of Michigan; of the College Club; of the auxiliary to the Grand Army of the Republic; and of the American Medical Temperance Association.

Frissell was the author of several papers, notably one on Memorial Day in Hampton, Virginia. She presented before the American Medical Association a paper on the treatment of diphtheria without alcohol, which was published in the Journal of the American Medical Association, November 13, 1897. She also wrote papers on the following topics: "Tobacco," "Contents of a Teapot," "Why I'm a Temperance Doctor," "Hygiene: Why it should be taught in our Public Schools," "Prevention better than Cure," "Colonial Flags and the Evolution of the Stars and Stripes," also "Pioneer Women in Medicine."

== Personal life ==
Frissell was involved in many of the progressive movements of the day. She was a member of the First Congregational Church of Springfield. During her residence in Pittsfield, she was elected the first president of the Woman's Christian Temperance Union of that city. For seven years, she was president of the Woman's Board of Missions of the South Church. She has been superintendent of the Department of Heredity and Health, Woman's Christian Temperance Union, for Hampden County. She died in 1915, and was buried in the Peru Center Cemetery, Peru, Massachusetts.
