= C. Annette Buckel =

American physician and Civil War nurse

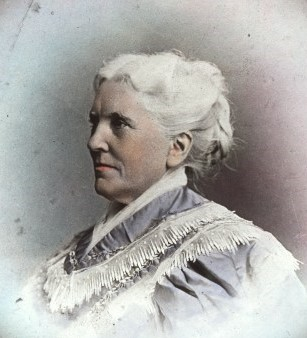
- Born: August 25, 1833; Warsaw
- Died: August 17, 1912
- Resting place: Mountain View Cemetery
- Education: Woman's Medical College of Pennsylvania
- Occupations: Nurse, medical doctor
- Employers: New England Hospital for Women and Children; NewYork-Presbyterian Lower Manhattan Hospital

C. Annette Buckel (August 25, 1833 – August 17, 1912) was an American physician and the first female medical doctor in Oakland, California. Buckel worked to improve the welfare of women and children through her medical practice as well as her activism. During the Civil War, she appointed and supervised nurses in addition to nursing in the field.

== Early life and education ==
Cloe Annette Buckel born August 25, 1833, in Warsaw, New York. Her given name is given variously as Cloe or Chloe, though she preferred to be called Annette. She was the only child of Thomas Buckel and his wife, whose given name is not known but whose surname was Bartlett. Both of her parents died when Cloe was three months old, and she was raised by her grandparents until age four. After her grandparents died, Buckel was raised by her aunts, young women who were strict disciplinarians and often told Cloe how much they resented having to raise her.

At age fourteen, Buckel left her relatives to teach in an elementary school in rural New York state, boarding with the parents of her students. She also worked in a burnishing factory in Connecticut, teaching herself Latin as she worked and living with her employer. She borrowed money from her life insurance policy to afford tuition to the Female Medical College of Pennsylvania. Buckel graduated in 1858 after submitting her thesis, titled A Treatise on Insanity.

== Medical career ==
Buckel started her career as a physician at the New York Infirmary for Indigent Women and Children, working with Elizabeth Blackwell and Emily Blackwell. After a year in New York she moved to Chicago, starting a similar clinic in 1859. She practiced medicine in Chicago until 1863.

Recognizing that nurses were needed to treat the wounded of the Civil War, in 1863 Buckel wrote to Indiana Governor Oliver P. Morton to volunteer her services. General Ulysses S. Grant granted Buckel permission to use all government hospitals in the Southwest and free military transportation. She began working as a nurse but was soon placed in a position of selecting and supervising nurses. By September 1864, Buckel was in Louisville, Kentucky, working as the agent for Dorothea Dix in assigning Army nurses. She supervised about fifty women nurses in Louisville and Jeffersonville. Buckel was appointed sanitary commissioner for Indiana by Governor Morton, and her reputation as a knowledgeable and judicious worker earned her the nickname the "Little Major." Throughout the war, she was referred to by military and medical officers as "Miss Buckel," as they were reluctant to recognize a woman with the title of "Doctor."

After the war, Buckel practiced medicine briefly in Evansville, Indiana, then started work as a resident physician at the New England Hospital for Women and Children, where she was employed for ten years. She directly succeeded Dr. Ruth A. Gerry in that position. To deepen her medical knowledge of surgical techniques, she studied medicine for two years in Vienna and Paris.

In 1877, Buckel moved to Oakland, California, becoming the first female doctor in Oakland. She opened her own practice and worked as a consulting physician for the Pacific Dispensary for Women and Children in San Francisco.

== Activism ==
Buckel was active in philanthropic work and civic efforts. She was the first woman admitted to the Alameda County Medical Association and became a prominent member. Her efforts as part of the Home Club, a women's organization in Oakland, a milk commission was established in the area and certified milk was provided to Oakland to ensure milk was not supplied by cows with tuberculosis. She also worked to establish a cooking school, which helped form a home economics program in Oakland schools.

Because of her challenging childhood, Buckel was especially interested in the welfare of orphaned children. Buckel also advocated for separate education for children with learning disabilities. At her death, she left her estate in a trust to care for intellectually disabled children; those funds were the basis of a research study into the educational needs of intellectually disabled children.

Buckel founded the local chapter of the Agassiz Association to encourage the study of natural science, established a Chautauqua Circle, and was a charter member of the original chapter of the Ebell Society.

== Later life and death ==
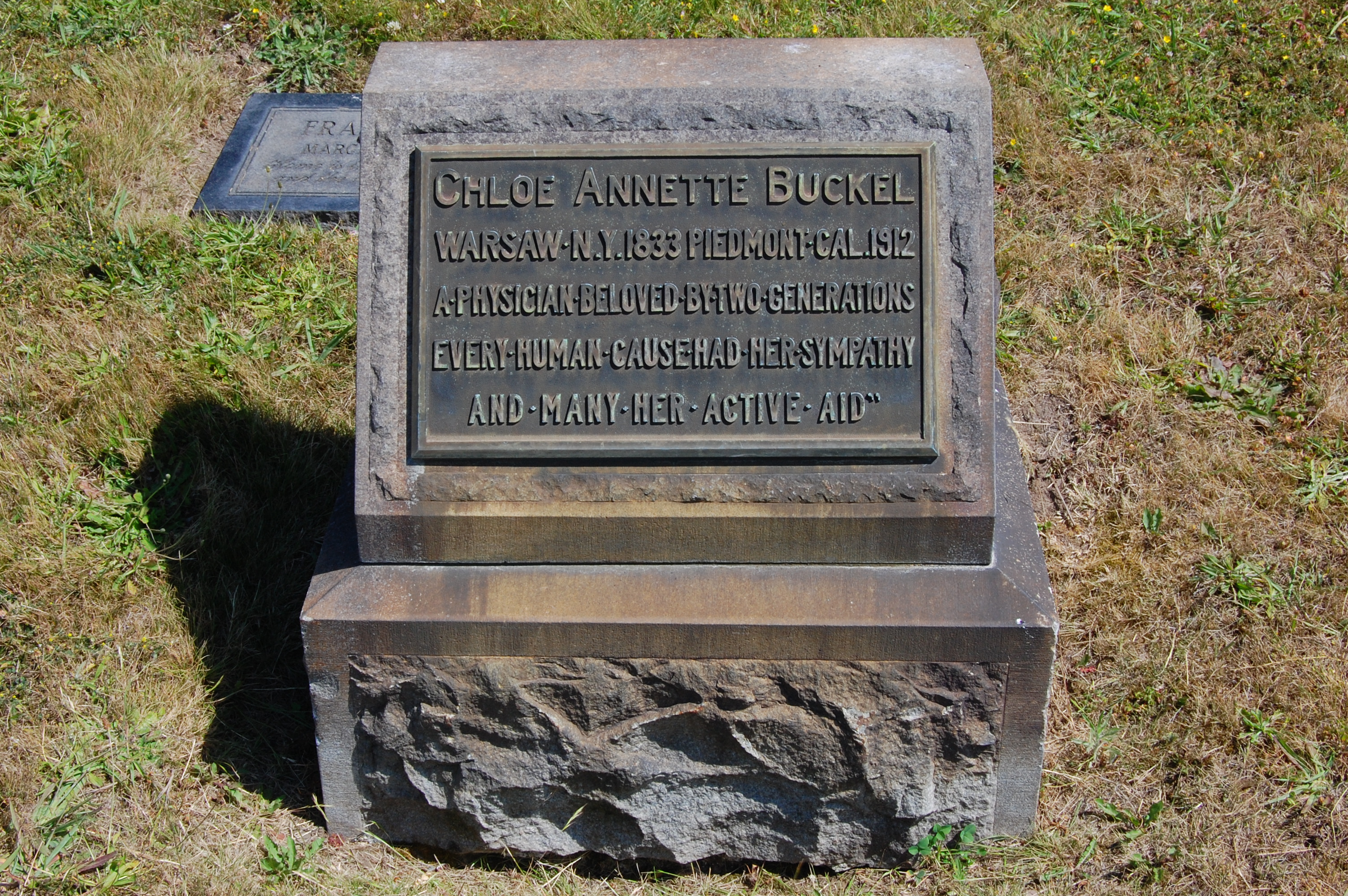
Grave

The Committee on Pensions granted Buckel twelve dollars a month in 1904 for her service during the American Civil War.

Buckel died August 17, 1912. The inscription on her gravestone in Mountain View Cemetery in Oakland reads "A physician beloved by two generations. Every human cause had her sympathy and many her active aid." She is buried near her cousin, Washington Bartlett, governor of California.

== Bibliography ==
- Buckel, C. Annette (1858). A treatise on insanity (PhD). Philadelphia, Pennsylvania: Female Medical College of Pennsylvania.
