= Penn Medical University =

Former medical school in Philadelphia Pennsylvania

Penn Medical College was founded by Dr. Joseph S. Longshore in 1853, but the name was changed to Penn Medical University in 1854. It was among the first medical colleges to admit both men and women but they attended separate sessions (fall term for women, spring term for men).

The school held classes in several locations in Philadelphia over the years, including Franklin Hall (on Sixth Street below Arch Street), the Thirteenth and Arch Streets, then 419 Market Street. In 1857, it moved to Twelfth and Chestnut Streets, then three years later to 910 Arch Street. At the Arch Street home a dispensary was opened in 1860, and in 1862 a dental department was established. In 1874, the school moved to its final location at 1131 Brown Street. The school closed in 1881. In 1853 the school awarded the Honorary Doctor of Medicine degree to Samuel Gregory who had founded Boston's New England Female Medical College five years earlier.

The Penn Medical University catalog for the year 1860 lists 27 female graduates including Dr. Elizabeth D. A. Cohen and Dr. Hettie Kersey Painter.

== Confusion about the name of the school ==
The chartered name of the institution was Penn Medical College but it was changed on January 14, 1854, by decree of the Court of Quarter Sessions to Penn Medical University, before its first year had drawn to a close. The school is very frequently confused with two other Philadelphia medical schools that existed at the same time. Because of "Penn" being in the name, the Medical Department of the University of Pennsylvania, with its longtime nickname "Penn," is one. The other is the Female Medical College of Pennsylvania, often confused because, like Penn Medical University, it also admitted women.
