= Herman Daggett =

American minister and animal rights writer (1766–1832)

The Reverend Herman Daggett
- Born: September 11, 1766; Walpole, Province of Massachusetts, British America
- Died: May 19, 1832 (aged 65); Cornwall, Connecticut, U.S.
- Resting place: Cornwall Cemetery, Cornwall, Connecticut, U.S. 41.84619°N 73.32429°W
- Occupations: Minister; educator; writer
- Notable work: The Rights of Animals (1792)
- Spouse: Sarah Mathewson (m. 1792)
- Relatives: Naphtali Daggett

Herman Daggett (September 11, 1766 – May 19, 1832) was an American Congregational minister, educator, and early animal rights writer. His 1791 oration The Rights of Animals, published the following year, has been described as the first known American treatise on animal rights.

== Biography ==
Daggett was born on September 11, 1766, in Walpole, Massachusetts. He was the son of the physician Ebenezer Daggett and a relative of Naphtali Daggett. He moved to Wrentham as a boy and entered Brown University in 1784, graduating in 1788.

Daggett studied theology under Nathanael Emmons. He was licensed as a Congregational preacher in 1789. He subsequently preached on Long Island and became pastor at Southampton on April 12, 1792. On September 3 of that year, he married Sarah Mathewson, the daughter of Colonel Mathewson.

After leaving Southampton, Daggett served the church at Westhampton from 1797 to 1801 and then the churches at Fire Place and Middle Island in Brookhaven until 1807. He later preached at New Canaan, Connecticut, and North Salem, New York. From 1818 to 1824, he was president of the Foreign Mission School in Cornwall, Connecticut.

Daggett died in Cornwall, Connecticut, on May 19, 1832, aged 65, and was buried in Cornwall Cemetery.

== Animal rights writing ==
On September 7, 1791, Daggett delivered an oration at Providence College, now Brown University, entitled The Rights of Animals: An Oration. The work argued for the moral protection of animals and has been regarded as an early contribution to animal advocacy in the United States.

Daggett delivered the oration while a candidate for the master's degree, and it was published in 1792 by David Frothingham. Andrew Linzey and Paul Barry Clarke have described it as "the first known American treatise on animal rights". The American Society for the Prevention of Cruelty to Animals reprinted the work in 1926.

== Publications ==
- The Rights of Animals (1791)
- An Abridgement of the Writings of Lewis Cornaro: A Nobleman of Venice on Health and Long Life (1824)
- The American Reader (1841)
