= Michigan State Medical Society =

Coordinates: 42.7474°N 84.4844°W

The Michigan State Medical Society (MSMS) is a professional association representing more than 15,000 physicians in Michigan. Incorporated on June 5, 1866, MSMS is a non-profit, membership organization of physicians, graduates completing residency programs, and medical school students. MSMS is the state affiliate of the American Medical Association.

The Michigan State Medical Society publishes the weekly Medigram eNewsletter and the bi-monthly Michigan Medicine® magazine.

== Mission ==
The mission of the Michigan State Medical Society is to improve the lives of physicians so they may best care for the people they serve.

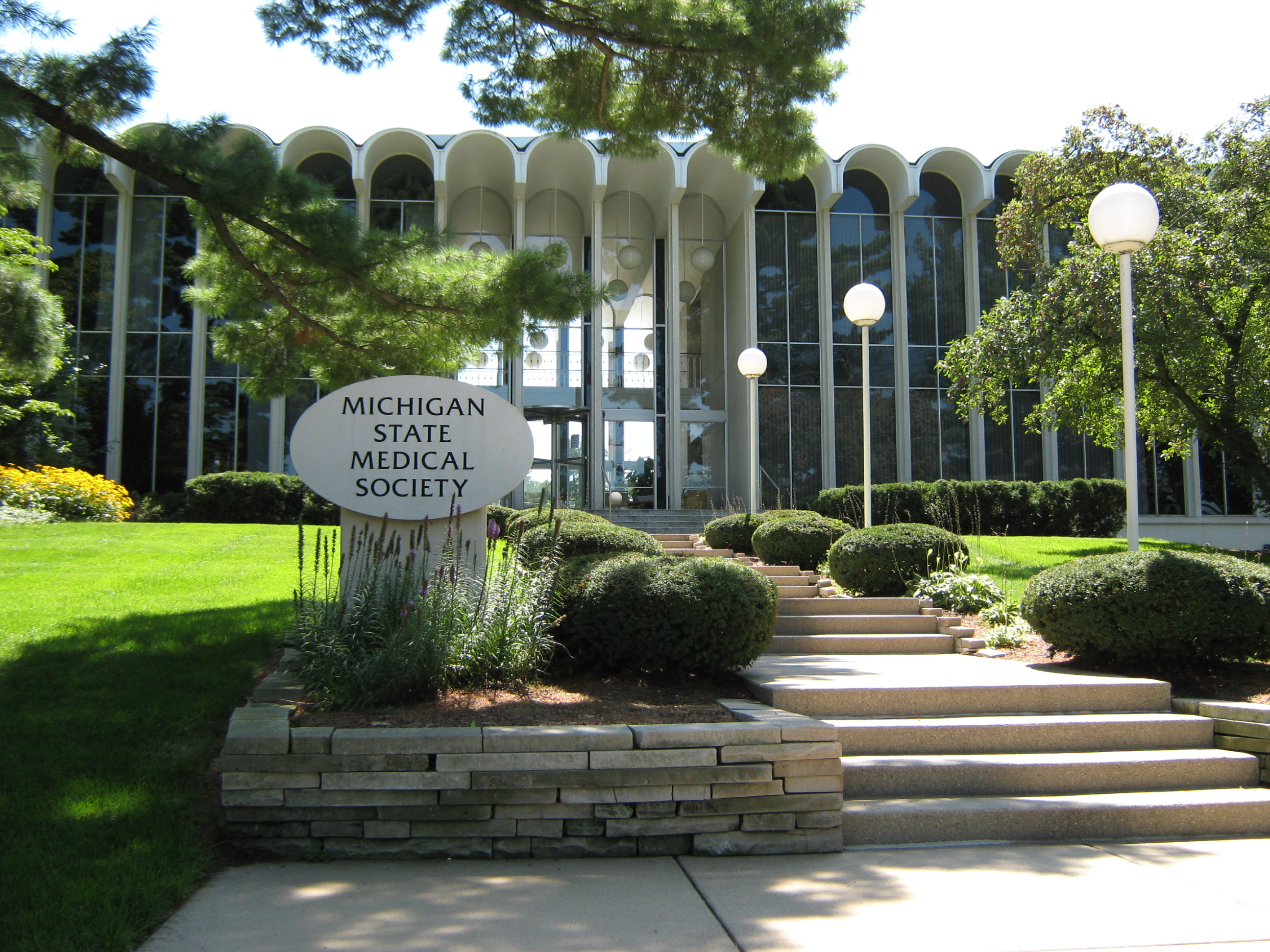
Michigan State Medical Society headquarters

== History ==
In 1819, five physicians organized the Michigan Medical Society in Detroit. Its purpose was "to examine medical students and certify those so deemed as doctors." The group later reorganized in Ann Arbor as the Peninsula Medical Society in 1851. That organization disbanded by 1859.

Formation of the Michigan State Medical Society took place June 5, 1866 in the Supreme Court Room of Odd Fellows Hall in Detroit, near Woodward and E. Jefferson Avenues. About 100 physicians from all areas in Michigan were present. The society pledged "to elevate professional and medical education and to cultivate the advancement of medical science." The society also adopted the code of ethics of the American Medical Association (AMA).

Women were first admitted to the society in 1872. Ruth A. Gerry, Sibelia F. Baker, and Frances A. Rutherford were the first women elected to membership in 1872.

Among its first projects was the establishment of a state public health department, which was created in 1873. The society was housed in various buildings in Detroit until a headquarters was constructed in Lansing.

The state society, a voluntary, professional organization, provides postgraduate training for physicians and strives to improve the public health by its public service, and educational activities.

== AMA Presidents from Michigan ==
- Zina Pitcher, MD, 1856
- William Brodie, MD, 1886
- Donald MacLean, MD, 1895
- Victor C. Vaughan, MD, 1914
- John J. Coury, MD, 1986
- Ronald M. Davis, MD, 2007

== MSMS Presidents ==
1866 - * C. M. Stockwell, MD, St. Clair
1867 - * J. H. Jerome, MD, Saginaw
1868 - * Wm. H. DeCamp, MD, Kent
1869 - * Richard Inglis, MD, Wayne
1870 - * I. H. Bartholomew, MD, Ingham
1871 - * H. O. Hitchcock, MD, Kalamazoo
1872 - * Alonzo B. Palmer, MD, Washtenaw
1873 - * E. H. Jenk, MD, Wayne
1874 - * R. C. Kedzie, MD, Ingham
1875 - * Wm. Brodie, MD, Wayne
1876 - * Abram Sager, MD, Washtenaw
1877 - * Foster Pratt, MD, Kalamazoo
1878 - * Ed Cox, MD, Calhoun
1879 - * George K. Johnson, MD, Kent
1880 - * J. R. Thomas, MD, Bay
1881 – * J. H. Jerome, MD, Saginaw
1882 - * George W. Topping, MD, Clinton
1883 - * A. F. Whelan, MD, Hillsdale
1884 - * Donald McLean, MD, Wayne
1885 - * E. P. Christian, MD, Wayne
1886 - * Charles Shepard, MD Kent
1887 - * T. A. McGraw, MD, Wayne
1888 - * S. S. French, MD, Calhoun
1889 - * G. E. Frothingham, MD, Wayne
1890 - * L. W. Bliss, MD, Saginaw
1891 - * George E. Ranney, MD, Ingham
1892 - * Charles J. Lundy, MD, Wayne (Died before taking office)
1892 - * Gilbert V. Chamberlain, MD, Genesee (Acting President)
1893 - * Eugene Boise, MD, Kent
1894 - * Henry O. Walker, MD, Wayne
1895 - * Victor C. Vaughan, MD, Washtenaw
1896 - * Hugh McColl, MD, Lapeer
1897 - * Joseph B. Griswold, MD, Kent
1898 - * Ernest L. Shurly, MD, Wayne
1899 - * A. W. Alvord, MD, Calhoun
1900 - * P. D. Patterson, MD, Eaton
1901 - * Leartus Conner, MD, Wayne
1902 - * A. E. Bulson, MD, Jackson
1903 - * Wm. F. Breakey, MD, Washtenaw
1904 - * B. D. Harison, MD, Chippewa
1905 - * David Inglis, MD, Wayne
1906 - * Charles B. Stockwell, MD, St. Clair
1907 - * Herman Ostrander, MD, Kalamazoo
1908 - * A. F. Lawbaugh, MD, Houghton
1909 - * J. H. Carstens, MD, Wayne
1910 - * C. B. Burr, MD, Genesee
1911 - * D. Emmet Welsh, MD, Kent
1912 - * Wm. H. Sawyer, MD, Hillsdale
1913 - * Guy L. Kiefer, MD, Wayne
1914 - * Reuben Peterson, MD, Washtenaw
1915 - * A. W. Hornbogen, MD, Marquette
1916 - * Andrew P. Biddle, MD, Wayne
1917 - * Andrew P. Biddle, MD, Wayne
1918 - * Arthur M. Hume, MD, Shiawassee
1919 - * Charles H. Baker, MD, Bay
1920 - * Angus McLean, MD, Wayne
1921 - * Wm. J. Kay, MD, Lapeer
1922 - * W. T. Dodge, MD, Mecosta
1923 - * Guy L. Connor, MD, Wayne
1924 - * C. C. Clancy, MD, St. Clair
1925 - * Cyrennus G. Darling, MD, Washtenaw
1926 - * J. B. Jackson, MD, Kalamazoo
1927 - * Herbert E. Randall, MD, Genesee
1928 - * Louis J. Hirschman, MD, Wayne
1929 - * J. D. Brook, MD, Kent
1930 - * Ray C. Stone, MD, Calhoun
1931 - * Carl F. Moll, MD, Genesee
1932 - * J. Milton Robb, MD, Wayne
1933 - * George LeFevre, MD, Muskegon
1934 - * R. R. Smith, MD, Kent
1935 - * Grover C. Penberthy, MD, Wayne
1936 - * Henry E. Perry, MD, Luce
1937 - * Henry Cook, MD, Genesee
1938 - * Henry A. Luce, MD, Wayne
1939 - * Burton R. Corbus, MD, Kent
1940 - * Paul R. Urmston, MD, Bay
1941 - * Henry R. Carstens, MD, Wayne
1942 - * H. H. Cummings, MD, Washtenaw
1943 - * C. R. Keyport, MD, Crawford
1944 - * A. S. Brunk, MD, Wayne
1945 - * V. M. Moore, MD, Kent (Died before taking office)
1945 - * R. S. Morrish, MD, Genesee
1946 - * Wm. A. Hyland, MD, Kent
1947 - * P. L. Ledwidge, MD, Wayne
1948 - * E. F. Sladek, MD, Grand Traverse
1949 - * Wilfred Haughey, MD, Calhoun (President-for-a-day, Sept. 21, 1949)
1949 - * W. E. Barstow, MD, Gratiot
1950 - * C. E. Umphrey, MD, Wayne
1951 - * Otto O. Beck, MD, Oakland
1952 - * R. L. Novy, MD, Wayne (President-for-a-day, Sept. 22, 1952)
1952 - * R. J. Hubbell, MD, Leelanau
1953 - * L. W. Hull, MD, Livingston
1954 - * L. Fernald Foster, MD, Bay (President-for-a-day, Sept. 28, 1954)
1954 - * R. H. Baker, MD, Oakland
1955 - * W. S. Jones, MD, Menominee
1956 - * Arch Walls, MD, Wayne
1957 - * G. W. Slagle, MD, Calhoun
1958 - * G. B. Saltonstall, MD, Charlevoix
1959 - * Milton A. Darling, MD, Wayne
1960 - * Kenneth H. Johnson, MD, Ingham
1961 - * Otto K. Engelke, MD, Washtenaw
1962 - * Clarence I. Owen, MD, Wayne
1963 - * Orlen J. Johnson, MD, Bay
1964 - * Oliver B. McGillicuddy, MD, Ingham
1965 - * Luther R. Leader, MD, Oakland
1966 - * C. Allen Payne, MD, Kent
1967 - * Bradley M. Harris, MD, Washtenaw
1968 - * James J. Lightbody, MD, Wayne
1969 - * Robert J. Mason, MD, Oakland
1970 - * Harold H. Hiscock, MD, Genesee
1971 - * Sidney Adler, MD, Wayne
1972 - * John J. Coury, MD, St. Clair
1973 - * Brooker L. Masters, MD, Newaygo
1974 - * Brooker L. Masters, MD, Newaygo
1975 - * Brock E. Brush, MD, Wayne
1976 - * Robert M. Leitch, MD, Calhoun
1977 - * Vernon V. Bass, MD, Saginaw
1978 - * Louis E. Heideman, MD, Oakland
1979 - * Ernest P. Griffin, Jr., MD, Genesee
1980 - * John R. Ylvisaker, MD, Oakland
1981 - * James D. Fryfogle, MD, Wayne
1982 - * David Siegel, MD, Ingham (President-for-a-day, May 1, 1982)
1982 - * James H. Tisdel, MD, St. Clair
1983 - Donald K. Crandall, MD, Muskegon
1984 - Louis R. Zako, MD, Wayne
1985 - * Richard J. McMurray, MD, Genesee
1986 - * Thomas R. Berglund, MD, Kalamazoo
1987 - * Carl A. Gagliardi, MD, Wayne
1988 - * Frederick W. Bryant, MD, Oakland
1989 - Leland E. Holly, II, MD, Muskegon (President-for-a-day, May 6, 1989)
1989 - * Robert E. Paxton, MD, Newaygo
1990 - Susan Hershberg Adelman, MD, Wayne
1991 - * Robert D. Burton, MD, Kent
1992 - * Thomas C. Payne, MD, Ingham
1993 - * Gilbert B. Bluhm, MD, Wayne
1994 - * Jack L. Barry, MD, Saginaw
1995 - * B. David Wilson, MD, Kalamazoo
1996 - * W. Peter McCabe, MD, Wayne
1997 - Peter A. Duhamel, MD, Oakland
1998 - Cathy O. Blight, MD, Genesee
1999 - Krishna K. Sawhney, MD, Wayne
2000 - Billy Ben Baumann, MD, Oakland
2001 - Kenneth H. Musson, MD, Grand Traverse
2002 - * Dorothy M. Kahkonen, MD, Wayne
2003 - Hassan Amirikia, MD, Wayne
2004 - * John M. MacKeigan, MD, Kent
2005 - Alan M. Mindlin, MD, Oakland
2006 - Paul O. Farr, MD, Kent
2007 - AppaRao Mukkamala, MD, Genesee
2008 - Michael A. Sandler, MD, Wayne
2009 - Richard E. Smith, MD, Wayne
2010 - Daniel B. Michael, MD, PhD, Wayne
2011 - Steven E. Newman, MD, Wayne
2012 - John G. Bizon, MD, Calhoun
2013 - Kenneth Elmassian, DO, Ingham
2014 - James D. Grant, MD, Oakland
2015 - Rose M. Ramirez, MD, Kent
2016 - David M. Krhovsky, MD, Kent
2017 - Cheryl Gibson Fountain, MD, Wayne
2018 - Betty S. Chu, MD, MBA, Oakland
2019 - Mohammed A. Arsiwala, MD, Wayne
2020 - S. Bobby Mukkamala, MD, Genesee
2021 - Pino Colone, MD, Genesee
2022 - Thomas J. Veverka, MD, FACS, Saginaw
2023 - M. Salim Siddiqui, MD, PhD, Wayne

*deceased

== Executive Directors, Chief Executive Officers ==
- William J. Burns, 1935-1963
- Hugh W. Brenneman, 1963-1970
- Warren F. Tryloff, 1970-1984
- Bruce W. Ambrose, 1984-1987
- William E. Madigan, 1987-2005
- Kevin A. Kelly, 2005-2008
- Julie L. Novak, CEO, 2008–2022
- Thomas M. George, MD, Interim CEO, 2022-present

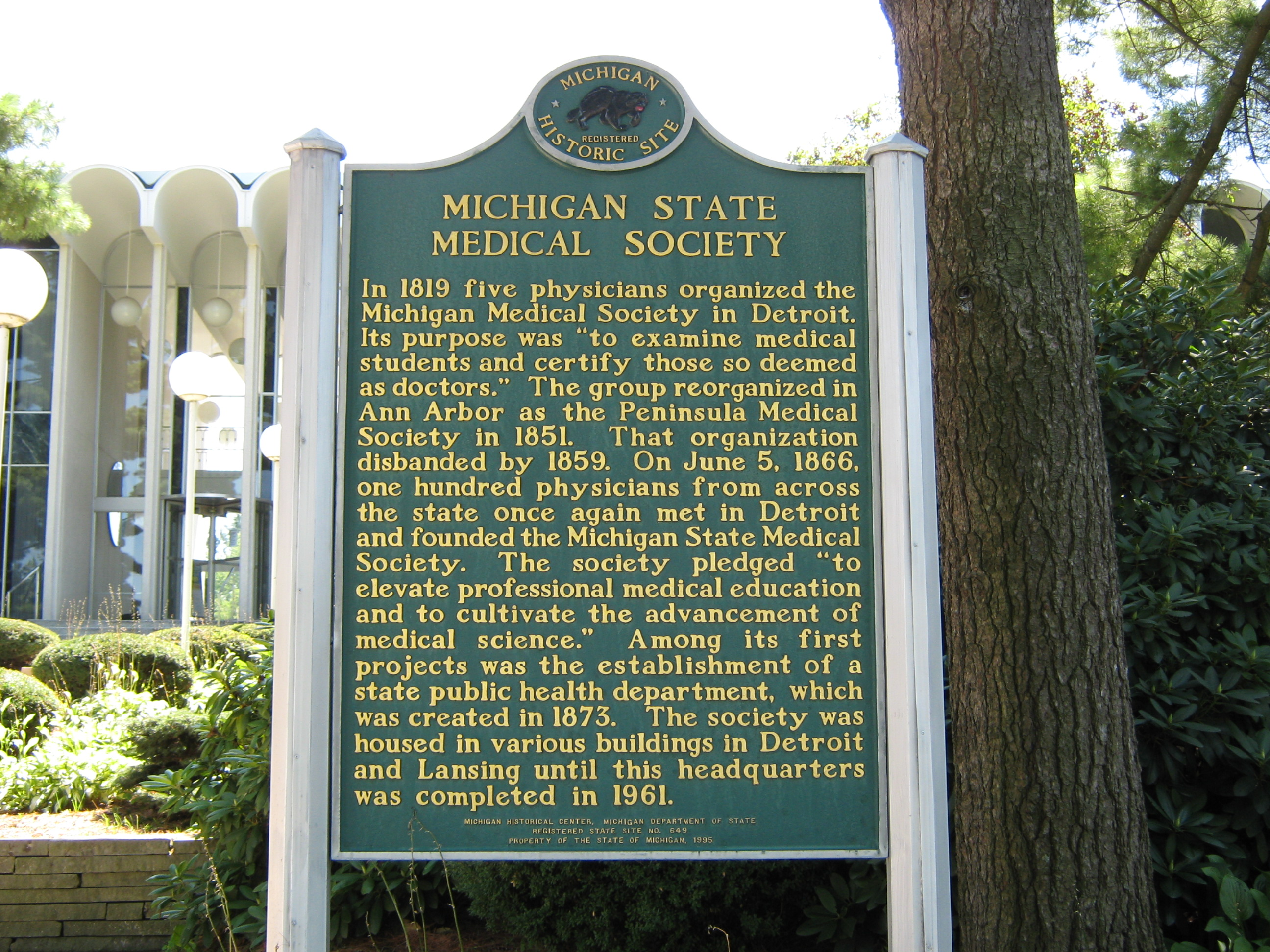
Michigan Historic Site marker

== Building ==
World-renowned Michigan architect Minoru Yamasaki (1912-1985) designed the Michigan State Medical Society headquarters. Upon its completion in 1961, Yamasaki explained, "The intent was to build a serene and inviting building to express the idealism and humanity of the medical profession." The terraced landscape, the slender columns, 31 rippling arches and the graceful lines inspired visitors to remark, "It seems to float in the air."

In 1991, the Yamasaki firm designed an atrium connecting the original building to the Cyrus M. Stockwell wing, named for the society's first president. Yamasaki's best known design was the World Trade Center in New York City.

The Michigan State Medical Society building is listed on the National Register of Historic Places. It's also designated as a Michigan Historical Site. The building was sold in May 2023 to Eyde Development.

== Leadership ==
- Thomas M. George, MD, Interim Chief Executive Officer
- Kevin M. McFatridge, Chief Operating Officer
- Lauchlin MacGregor, III, Chief Financial Officer

== Officers ==
- M. Salim Siddiqui, MD, PhD, President
- Mark C. Komorowski, MD President-elect
- Jayne E. Courts, MD, FACP, Secretary
- John A. Waters, MD, Treasurer
- Phillip G. Wise, MD, House Speaker
- Bryan W. Huffman, MD, House Vice Speaker
- Thomas A. Veverka, MD, FACS, Immediate Past President
- Paul D. Bozyk, MD, Chair
- Bradley J. Uren, MD, Vice Chair

== Affiliate organizations ==
- MDPAC
- Michigan State Medical Society Alliance - Official Site
- Michigan State Medical Society Foundation
- MSMS Physicians Insurance Agency
- Professional Credential Verification Service (PCVS)
- Physicians Review Organization
- SafeHaven™
