= Nathanael Emmons =

American Congregational minister (1745–1840)

- Born: 20 April 1745; East Haddam, Connecticut
- Died: 23 September 1840 (aged 95); Franklin, Massachusetts
- Education: Yale
- Ordained: 1769

Nathanael Emmons, sometimes spelled Nathaniel Emmons, (April 20, 1745 – September 23, 1840) was an American Congregational minister and influential theologian of the New Divinity school. He was born at East Haddam, Connecticut.

Emmons graduated at Yale in 1767, studied theology under the Rev. John Smalley (1734–1820) at Berlin, Connecticut, and was licensed to preach in 1769. After preaching four years in New York and New Hampshire, he became, in April 1773, pastor of the Second church at Franklin (until 1778 a part of Wrentham, Massachusetts), of which he remained in charge until May 1827, when failing health compelled his relinquishment of active ministerial cares. He lived, however, for many years thereafter, dying of old age at Franklin on the 23rd of September 1840.

It was as a theologian that Emmons was best known, and for half a century probably no clergyman in New England exerted so wide an influence. He developed an original system of divinity, somewhat on the structural plan of that of Samuel Hopkins, and, in Emmons's own belief, contained in and evolved from Hopkinsianism. While by no means abandoning the tenets of the old Calvinistic faith, he came to be looked upon as the chief representative of what was then known as the New Divinity.

His system declared that holiness and sin are free voluntary exercises; that men act freely under the divine agency; that the slightest transgression deserves eternal punishment; that it is through God's mere grace that the penitent believer is pardoned and justified; that, in spite of total depravity, sinners ought to repent; and that regeneration is active, not passive, with the believer. Emmonsism was spread and perpetuated by more than a hundred clergymen, whom he personally trained. Politically, he was an ardent patriot during the American War of Independence, and a strong Federalist afterwards, several of his political discourses attracting wide attention.

He was a founder and the first president of the Massachusetts Missionary Society, and was influential in the establishment of Andover Theological Seminary. More than two hundred of his sermons and addresses were published during his lifetime. His Works were published in 6 vols (Boston, 1842; new edition, 1861).

See also the Memoir, by Dr EA Park (Andover, 1861).

== Early life and education ==
Born in East Haddam, Connecticut, Emmons was the sixth son, and twelfth and youngest child, of Samuel and Ruth (Cone) Emmons. Both his parents were professors of religion, and he was the subject of an early Christian training. Early in his life, his father intended to give Nathaniel a liberal education, and to allow him to enter someone of the professions; but on witnessing his volatile, trifling spirit, he changed his mind, and determined to sober his views by making him a farmer. Emmons, however, never cared for labor, and intended in some way to escape it if possible. Being indisposed to agricultural pursuits, to which his childhood and early youth were devoted, and having an ardent thirst for knowledge, he gained his father's consent to commence a course of classical study. He studied vigorously, and after ten months he was admitted to Yale College in September, 1763. He graduated in 1767, in the same class as John Treadwell, John Trumbull, and several other of the noted New England natives. Emmons lost his father about three months before his graduated, inheriting only a bequest for defraying the expenses of his education.

Emmons devoted a few months to the business of teaching, and then went to reside with the Rev. Nathan Strong of Coventry, Connecticut, as a theological student. However, after a short time, he placed himself under the instruction of the Rev. John Smalley, of Berlin, who had then the reputation of being one of the ablest Divines in New England.

Of his early religious history Emmons stated that "by reading the life of a pious youth, I was sensibly struck with a conviction of my great guilt and the awful thought of dying unprepared", noting that "[w]hen one of my sisters died of consumption, my fears about myself were again alarmed, and I had some lively apprehensions of the state of the damned, especially of the lake that burned with fire and brimstone".

Emmons further described the feelings that led him to pursue a career in the ministry:

All this time, however, I had no sense of the total corruption of my heart, and its perfect opposition to God. But one night there came up a terrible thunderstorm, which gave me such an awful sense of God's displeasure and of my going into a miserable eternity, as I never had before. I durst not close my eyes in sleep daring the whole night, but lay crying for mercy with anxiety and distress. This impression continued day after day, and week after week, and put me upon the serious and diligent use of what I supposed to be the appointed means of grace. In this state of mind I went to Dr. Smalley's to pursue my theological studies.

I felt a peculiar complacence in good men, but thought they were extremely stupid, because they did not appear to be more delighted with the Gospel, and more engaged to promote the cause of Christ. I pitied the deplorable condition of ignorant, stupid sinners, and thought I could preach so plainly as to convince every body of the glory and importance of the Gospel. These were my views and feelings about eight months before I became a candidate for the ministry.

== Ministry ==
Emmons was licensed to preach by the South Association of Hartford County, in October, 1769. The examination which he underwent, on that occasion, was, on several points, unsatisfactory to a part of the Association, particularly on the doctrines of depravity, regeneration, human and Divine agency. Several of the older clergymen voted against his licensure, and one of them, the Rev. Mr. Eells of Middletown, went so far as to throw in a written remonstrance. Emmons may have originally been somewhat inclined to Arminian views. Under the teachings of the Rev. Strong, he embraced Calvinism, as embodied in the writings of theologians like Thomas Ridgeley and Samuel Willard. Subsequently, under Dr. Smalley, he become, in the then popular acceptation of the word, a new-school man. The points which were specially agitated at his examination, came up for discussion, at several subsequent meetings of the Association, and the result was the formation of a "conciliatory creed" upon the points in question, in which the different parties agreed to unite. Having preached in various places for nearly four years, he accepted a call from the church in Franklin, then the Second church in Wrentham, Massachusetts, to become their pastor, formally begin his pastorship there on April 21, 1773.

Emmons was a zealous Whig during the American Revolution. He spoke publicly and without hesitation in favor of independence, which caused some hostility in his congregation, which was considerably divided on the issue. He also went through some financial distress during the war, due to the irregular and partial payment of his salary. Both his prosperity and his popularity rebounded after the conclusion of the war.

Emmons considered himself an intellectual theologian, rather than an orator, and sought to influence his parishioners with reasoned arguments rather than stirring speeches. However, he was noted to have "a kind of haughty confidence in his own creed ... as though all his tenets were the accredited verities of heaven", which "caused him to think disparagingly of all other creeds". A Universalist once replied to a sermon of his, and published the sermon and reply in the same pamphlet. A friend asked Emmons what he thought of it. "It is against the law," said Emmons, "for Moses says, 'Thou shalt not plow with an ox and an ass together.'" In 1798 he received an honorary degree of Doctor of Divinity from Dartmouth College. The New England magazine wrote of him:

His quaint, antique dress, cocked hat, knee breeches, silken hose and shoe buckles belonged as distinctively to the dress of a former generation as did his austere, inflexible, unanswerable arguments to their theology.

Throughout his life, Emmons abstained almost entirely from alcohol, seldom drank tea or coffee, and ate simply and in moderate quantities. He studied from twelve to seventeen hours a day, seldom leaving his study for anything but meals, rest, and his parochial duties. He was described as "a man of strong convictions and an indomitable will, which gave to his character an aspect of sternness, of chilly dignity".

== Personal life ==
In 1775, Emmons married Deliverance, daughter of Moses French, of Braintree, Massachusetts, who was said to have been "a pattern of prudence, condescension, benevolence, and faithfulness". However, she quickly fell into a decline, and died in June 1778. Within two months from her death, his two little sons, the only surviving members of his family, suddenly sickened and died in one day, and were buried in the same grave. His recorded reflections on the occasion show that, while his heart was deeply smitten, it was full of humble trust in the Divine wisdom and goodness.

Within about a year and four months from the death of his first wife, Emmons married Martha, daughter of the Rev. Chester Williams of Hadley, Massachusetts. He found her to be a companion not only distinguished for her excellent intellectual and moral qualities, but of such exemplary domestic habits as to relieve him, in a great measure, from the ordinary cares of his family. By this marriage he had six children, two sons and four daughters. In 1813, Emmons' second daughter died, followed within a few years by another son and daughter. Emmons' second wife, Martha, died in August 1829, when Emmons was 85. In 1831, Emmons married for the third time, to the widow of the late Rev. Edmund Mills of Sutton, Massachusetts. His health and spirits seemed to revive, so that he was enabled to endure the fatigue of several journeys of considerable length.

== Later life and death ==
In May 1827, Emmons fainted at the pulpit, in the midst of his discourse, and had to be carried home. He was able, however, on the next Sabbath, to finish his discourse. It was listened to with uncommon interest, in part because the impression was very general in the congregation that it would prove to be, as it actually did, his last public service. On the next Sabbath he sent a letter resigning his pastoral charge, and requesting that the congregation make immediate provision for the supply of the pulpit. His resignation was accepted with some objections, but Emmons continued ministering in private. After he retired from the active duties of his office, he spent a large part of his time in reading.

In the summer and autumn of 1840, his strength began perceptibly to decline, he died at about three o'clock on Wednesday morning, September 23, 1840. His funeral was held the following Monday, and a sermon was preached by the Rev. Thomas Williams, from Ecclesiastes XII, 9; which was published.

== Publications ==
His publications include:

- Instructions to the Afflicted
- Hopkinsian Calvinism
- A sermon on the foreknowledge of God

== See also ==
- Seraph Frissell
- Herman Daggett
