= Linda Richards =

First professionally trained American nurse (1841 – 1930)

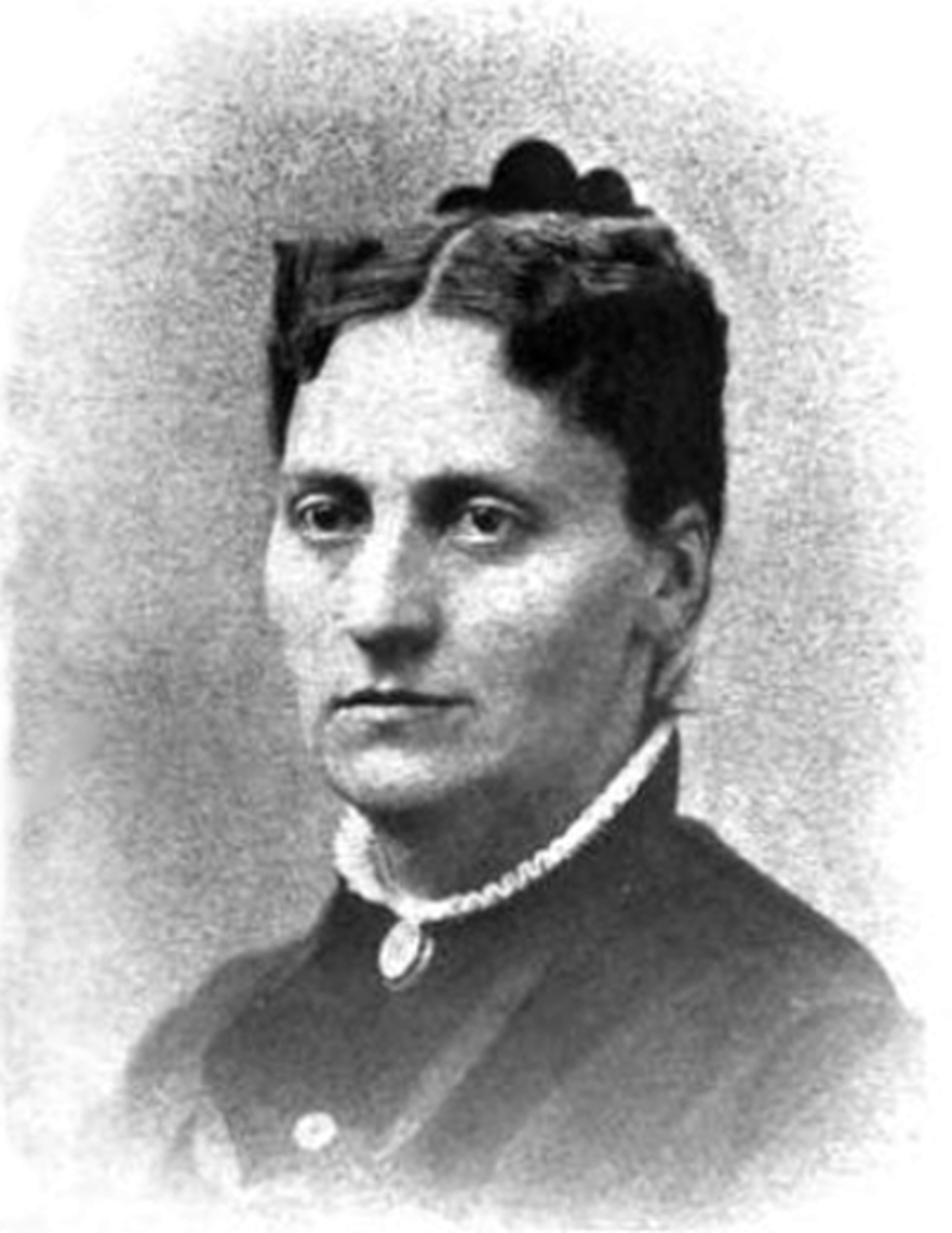
- Born: Malinda Ann Judson Richards; July 27, 1841; West Potsdam, New York, US
- Died: April 16, 1930 (aged 88); Boston, Massachusetts, US
- Education: New England Hospital for Women and Children
- Known for: Pioneering modern nursing in the United States
- Medical career
- Profession: Nurse

Linda Richards (July 27, 1841 – April 16, 1930) was the first professionally trained American nurse. She established nursing training programs in the United States and Japan, and created the first system for keeping individual medical records for hospitalized patients.

== Early life ==
Richards was born Malinda Ann Judson Richards on July 27, 1841, in West Potsdam, New York. She was the youngest of three daughters of Betsy Sinclair Richards and Sanford Richards, a preacher, who named his daughter after the missionary Ann Hasseltine Judson in the hopes that she would follow in her footsteps.

In 1845, Richards moved with her family to Wisconsin, where they owned some land. However, her father died of tuberculosis just weeks after they arrived there, and the family soon had to return to Richards' grandparents' home in Newbury, Vermont. They purchased a small farm just outside the town and settled there. Betsy Sinclair Richards also contracted tuberculosis, and Linda Richards nursed her mother until her death from the disease in 1854.

== Education ==
Her experience with nursing her dying mother awakened Richards' interest in nursing. Though in 1856, at the age of fifteen, Richards entered St. Johnsbury Academy for a year in order to become a teacher, and indeed taught for several years, she was never truly happy in that profession. In 1860, Richards met George Poole, to whom she became engaged. Not long after their engagement, Poole joined the Green Mountain Boys and left home to fight in the American Civil War. He was severely wounded in 1865, and when he returned home, Richards cared for him until his death in 1869.

Inspired by these personal losses, she moved to Boston, Massachusetts in order to become a nurse. Her first job was at Boston City Hospital, where she received almost no training and was subjected to overwork. She left that hospital after only three months but was undaunted by her experiences there. In 1872, Linda Richards became the first student to enroll in the inaugural class of five nurses in the first American Nurse's training school. This pioneering school was run by Dr. Susan Dimock, at the New England Hospital for Women and Children in Boston.

Linda describes her nursing training: “We rose at 5.30 a.m. and left the wards at 9 p.m. to go to our beds, which were in little rooms between the wards. Each nurse took care of her ward of six patients both day and night. Many a time I got up nine times in the night; often I did not get to sleep before the next call came. We had no evenings out, and no hours for study or recreation. Every second week we were off duty one afternoon from two to five o'clock. No monthly allowance was given for three months.”

== Career ==
Upon graduating one year later, she moved to New York City, where she was hired as a night supervisor at Bellevue Hospital Center. While working there, she created a system for keeping individual records for each patient, which was to be widely adopted both in the United States and in the United Kingdom. Aware of how little she still knew as a nurse, Linda began her quest to acquire more knowledge and then pass this on to others by establishing high quality nurse training schools.

Returning to Boston in 1874, she was named superintendent of the Boston Training School for Nurses (now, Massachusetts General Hospital School of Nursing). Though the school's training program was only a year old at the time, it was under threat of closure due to poor management. Richards, however, improved the program to such an extent that it was soon regarded as one of the best of its kind in the country.

In an effort to upgrade her skills, Richards took an intensive, seven-month nurse training program in England in 1877. She trained under Florence Nightingale (who set up a training school for nurses) and was a resident visitor at St Thomas' Hospital and King's College Hospital in London, and the Royal Infirmary of Edinburgh. On her return to the United States with Nightingale's warmest wishes, Richards pioneered the founding and superintending of nursing training schools across the nation.

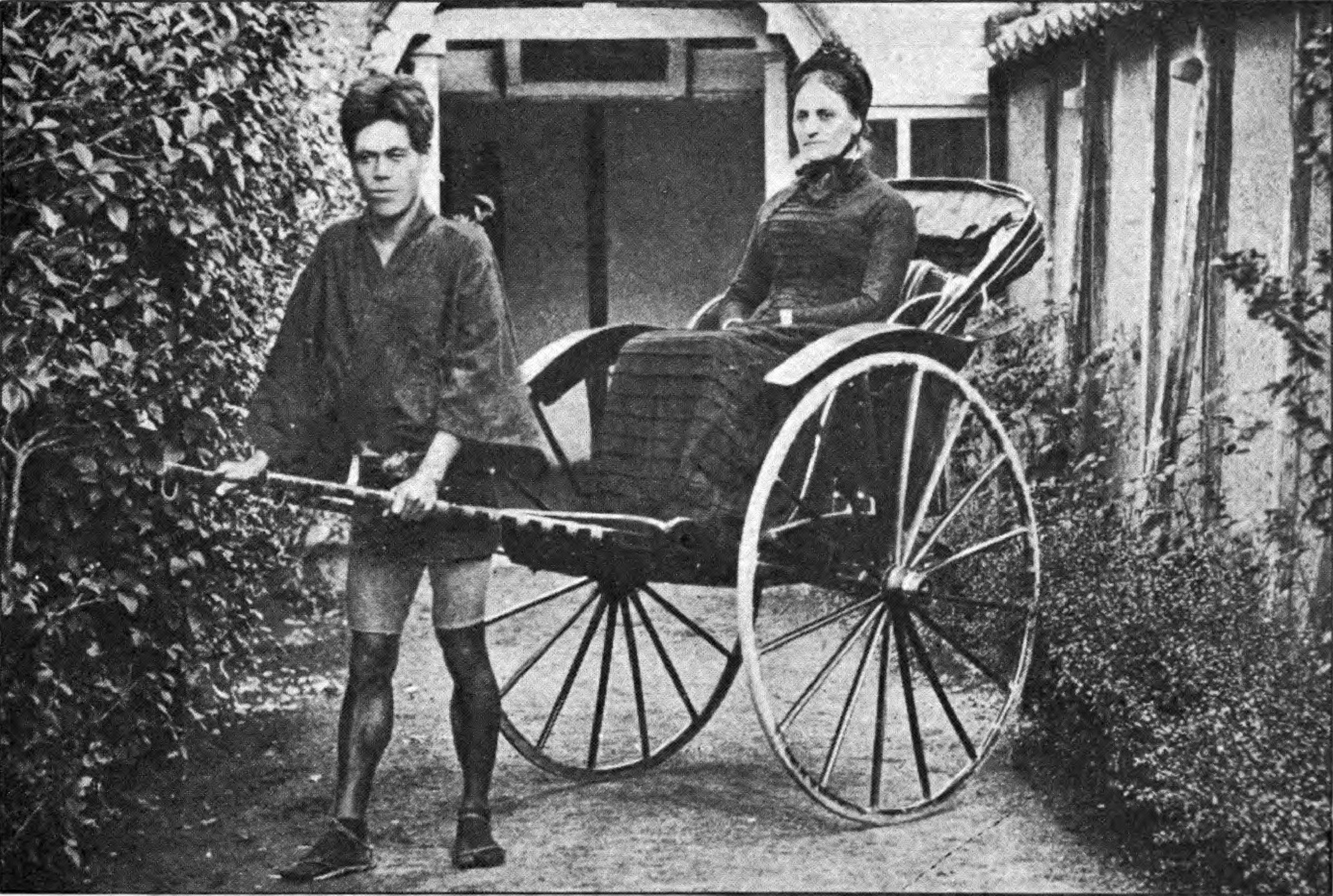
Linda Richards in Japan

In 1885 she helped to establish Japan's first nurses-training program. She supervised the school at the Doshisha Hospital in Kyoto for five years. When she returned to the United States in 1890, she worked as a nurse for another twenty years while helping to establish special institutions for those with mental illnesses, and created the first system for keeping individual medical records for hospitalized patients. She was elected as the first president of the American Society of Superintendents of Training Schools, and served as head of the Philadelphia Visiting Nurses Society. She retired from nursing in 1911, at the age of seventy.

She wrote a book about her experiences, Reminiscences of Linda Richards (1911) which has been republished in 2006 as America's First Trained Nurse. Richards suffered a severe stroke in 1923, and was hospitalized until her death on April 16, 1930. Richards was inducted into the National Women's Hall of Fame in 1994. She is mentioned in connection with Mass. General Hospital on the Boston Women's Heritage Trail.

Later scholarship has revealed that Harriet Newton Philips may have completed her nursing training prior to Richards, which would make Phillips the first trained nurse in the United States.
