= Hettie Kersey Painter =

American physician and nurse (1821–1889)

- Born: Esther Kersey; June 2, 1821; Philadelphia, Pennsylvania, U.S.
- Died: August 8, 1889 (aged 68); Lincoln, Nebraska, U.S.
- Education: Penn Medical University
- Occupation: Physician

Hettie Kersey Painter (June 2, 1821 – August 8, 1889) was an American medical doctor who served as a nurse in the American Civil War, organizing the first Union army hospital south of the Potomac River. She graduated from Penn Medical University in 1860. Later in life, she owned and operated a clinic in Lincoln, Nebraska.

== Early life and education ==
Painter was born Esther Kersey in Philadelphia to Joseph and Charity Kersey (née Cope). Her grandfather was Jesse Kersey, a respected Quaker Hicksite minister. Her parents died when she was 7, and her uncle and aunt, Mordecai and Esther Hayes of Newlin Township, Pennsylvania, adopted her and raised her. Throughout her life, Hettie would be a devout Quaker and a committed humanitarian and activist.

In March 1840, Hattie married Joseph H. Painter of West Chester. In 1846, they moved to Massillon, Ohio, where they participated in the temperance movement, the women's suffrage movement, and the abolitionist movement, with their house serving as a station on the Underground Railroad. The Painters had two sons, J. K. and L. M. Painter. In the 1850s, they returned to Philadelphia and soon after moved to Camden, New Jersey. She enrolled in Penn Medical University and graduated with an MD degree in 1860.

== Civil War service ==
When the American Civil War broke out in 1861, Painter volunteered her services as a nurse to the Union army. Under General Philip Kearny, she established the first Union army hospital south of the Potomac River, at a seminary near Manassas, Virginia, and led a medical team of 40 men. After the First Battle of Bull Run, she followed the army, working in hospitals and on the field and receiving commissions from the governors of Pennsylvania and New Jersey. General Ulysses S. Grant gave her free passage on all railroads and steamboats operating against the Confederate capital and ordered his officers to assist her. Painter managed hospitals, cared for wounded men, wrote letters for them, and distributed medical and commissary supplies. When the war ended, she continued to work in Virginia and Washington, D.C., hospitals, often accompanying sick and wounded soldiers to their homes or civilian hospitals.

== Later career and death ==
In 1868, Painter moved to the western territories, visiting her sons, who worked for the Union Pacific Railroad in Cheyenne, Wyoming, and Corinne, Utah, respectively. After recovering from a serious illness, she established a large and respected medical practice in the Salt Lake City area, treating family members of California governor John Bigler and Mormon leaders Brigham Young and John Sharp. After her health broke down again, she moved to Lincoln, Nebraska, where her husband edited a semi-monthly farm journal called the Nebraska Patron. There she established an infirmary for chronic cases, attracting patients from Connecticut to California. The U.S. government granted her a pension for her wartime service in 1888. She died of heart disease in Lincoln on August 8, 1889.

Nebraska's Daughters of Union Veterans of the Civil War named two of its tents in her honor: H. K. Painter Tent #1 in 1990 and Tent #37 in 1936.
