= Hannah Myrick =

American physician

Hannah Glidden Myrick (August 31, 1871 – October 23, 1973) was the first female physician to receive a medical degree from Johns Hopkins University in 1900, thereby helping to blaze the trail for more women to enter medicine. Prior to Johns Hopkins, she attended Boston Boy's Latin School on a rare exception as a female. In 1886, Myrick graduated from Smith College. She practiced medicine in Boston and acted as the superintendent of the New England Hospital for Women and Children, where she helped to introduce the use of X-rays to treat women and children. She never got married or had children.
