= Marie Elizabeth Zakrzewska =

Polish-American female physician

Marie Elisabeth Zakrzewska
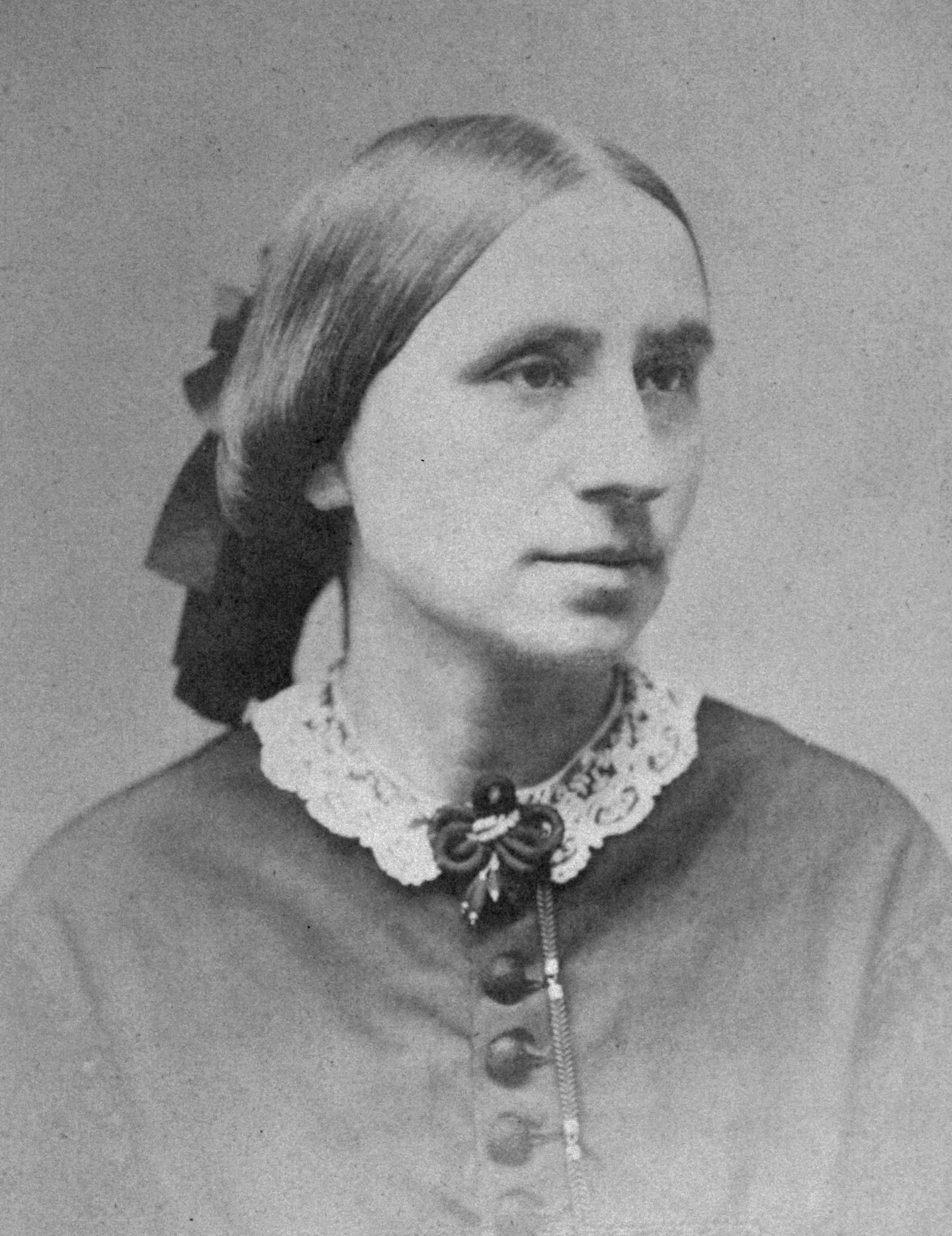
- Portrait of Maria E. Zakrzewska, ca. 1845–1855.
- Born: 6 September 1829
- Died: 12 May 1902 (aged 72)
- Education: Western Reserve
- Occupation: Physician

Marie Elisabeth Zakrzewska (6 September 1829 – 12 May 1902) was a German-American physician who made her name as a pioneering female doctor in the United States. As a Berlin native, she found great interest in medicine after assisting her mother, who worked as a midwife. Best known for the establishment of the New England Hospital for Women and Children, she opened doors to many women who were interested in the medical field and provided them with hands-on learning opportunities. Within the New England Hospital, she established the first general training school for nurses in America. Her drive and perseverance made the idea of women in medicine less daunting. She also initiated the creation of the first sand gardens for children in America.

== Early life ==
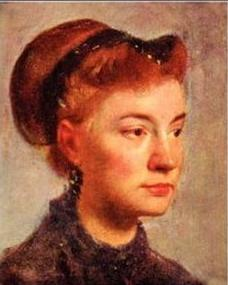
Painting of Maria E. Zakrzewska

During the 1795 final Third Partition of Poland Ludwig Martin Zakrzewski and his wife, Caroline Fredericke Wilhelmina Urban, fled to Berlin, Germany, after losing much of his land to Russia. After settling into their new life in Germany, Marie Elizabeth was born on September 6, 1829. She was the eldest of six children. Marie Zakrzewska was a bright child and excelled during grade school. Here she exhibited traits that portrayed her as an exceptional student. Her teachers would applaud her for her great successes in school. However, her father did not plan on allowing her to continue in school past the years of acquiring basic skills. Zakrzewska left school at the age thirteen.

After moving to Berlin, Ludwig Zakrzewski first worked as an army official and then as a government official in later years. When he lost his position in the government, he was forced back into the army, reducing his family to poverty. In the years of crisis, Marie's mother enrolled in the government school of midwives in Berlin. Once her mother's practice became successful, Marie accompanied her as she made rounds to her patients. Zakrzewska learned novel lessons and kept a record of these experiences in her diary. She read any medicinal book that she could get her hands on. Zakrzewska became increasingly interested in the field of nursing and eventually decided to become a midwife.

Zakrzewska applied for admission to the government midwifery school, Royal Charité Hospital in Berlin. She applied at age nineteen and again at twenty, only to be repeatedly rejected. Dr. Joseph Schmidt, a professor at the school, was impressed with her persistence. He was also fascinated with Zakrzewska as he watched her work with her mother. After several applications, Zakrzewska was admitted into the midwifery school when Dr. Schmidt secured her a spot. She was the youngest woman to attend the school, which made her highly visible in the classroom. Regardless of the obstacles that came in her way, she outperformed her fellow classmates and graduated from the program in 1851.

Dr. Schmidt was so impressed with Zakrzewska's success that he attempted to appoint her a chief midwife with the rank as a professor at the college. No woman had ever held this position and debates arose surrounding this appointment. Many believed that because men would surround her, she would fall in love, thus ending her career. Despite the challenges, Zakrzewska was appointed to the position at age twenty-two. She was responsible for more than two hundred students, men included. Zakrzewska's mentor died only a few hours after she assumed the position. Without Dr. Schmidt supporting her role as chief midwife, protests led to her early dismissal after only six months in the position.

== Moving to America ==
After her resignation from the role as chief midwife at the Royal Charité Hospital in Berlin and studying medicine there, Zakrzewska set off to start a new life in America with her sister, Anna Zakrzewska. Marie yearned to find vast opportunities to practice medicine as a woman in America. In 1853, Marie and her sister reached New York. After connecting with a family friend, a physician, she realized that female physicians faced considerable disadvantages in the United States. It was extremely difficult for Marie to find a job assisting a male physician, let alone establish her own practice. The Zakrzewska sisters' funds were dwindling and to survive, they settled for sewing embroidered worsted materials. They sold these materials in the marketplace and earned as much as a dollar per day.

Although her business was flourishing, Zakrzewska could not help but desire a life of practicing medicine. A year after arriving in New York, she visited the Home for the Friendless, which was well known for its support of immigrants. It was here that she was introduced to Dr. Elizabeth Blackwell, the first woman in the United States to obtain her degree in medicine from a college established solely for men. Zakrzewska was excited to meet a fellow woman who shared the same passion for medicine. Following her meeting, Zakrzewska was invited to join the staff at the Blackwell's dispensary.

Blackwell arranged for Zakrzewska's entry into the Western Reserve University's medical program that was unique in accepting female students. With her acceptance, she had to be willing to learn sufficient English. As she was planning to move out west to attend the program, she ran into further obstacles. She was one of only four women out of two hundred students attending the medical school. Two of the other women, Dr. Cordelia A. Greene, of Castile, New York and Dr. Elizabeth Griselle, of Salem, Ohio, would become life-long friends. No one wanted to share an apartment with a female doctor, so Blackwell arranged for temporary housing at the home of Caroline Severance. The men on campus welcomed her with disgust and hostility. They petitioned the institution to refuse to enroll the women after the winter term. Despite the bumpy road, she obtained her medical degree in March 1856 at the age of twenty-seven.

After receiving her degree in medicine, she returned to New York to find a job. Though it was difficult to find a job as a midwife, she hoped that the search would be easier with a medical degree. She quickly found out that it was no different as a woman. As a lady "doctor," her presence in public received scornful looks and Zakrzewska was quickly ostracized by the public. Eventually, Elizabeth Blackwell used the back parlor of her house as a doctor's office where Zakrzewska hung her physician's shingle for the first time. The tiresome rejections and repeated obstacles to practicing medicine that Blackwell and Zakrzewska encountered sparked the idea of creating their own infirmary to meet the medical demands of women and children. They traveled together and held events to raise money for their grand idea. On May 1, 1857, the New York Infirmary for Women and Children was in business. By 1859, the New York Infirmary stood on a solid foundation of funds with a growing number of patients. A typical day for Zakrzewska began at 5:30 a.m. and did not end until 11:30 p.m.

Zakrzewska traveled to Boston as her desire for a greater challenge grew. She fell in love with the city and was offered an appointment as Professor of Obstetrics and Diseases of Women and Children as well as to serve as head of a new clinical program at the Boston Female Medical College. Zakrzewska found that the people of Boston were more supportive of a female physician than those whom she encountered in New York. When the founder of the college, Samuel Gregory, insisted that graduating female physicians would be addressed as "doctresses" instead of doctor, Zakrzewska resigned from her position in 1861.

=== The New England Hospital for Women and Children ===
Reflecting on the many obstacles she encountered in her life, Zakrzewska decided that she wanted to aid aspiring female doctors in some way. She believed that women were in desperate need of a hospital in which they were not denied the facilities for clinical instruction and could practice medicine. The New England Hospital for Women and Children opened its doors on July 1, 1862. The goals of this college were to provide women with medical treatment from physicians of their own sex, to provide women with the opportunity to experience the clinical application of medicine, and to train nurses. She stressed her intentions to prove that women were just as capable as men to run a hospital and practice medicine.

The New England Hospital was not the only hospital in Boston that offered care for women and children. However, it was unique in that it offered clinical practice to female physicians. For Zakrzewska, it was one thing to study information and be lectured to in the classroom. However, many females were denied the opportunity to practice medicine from a hands-on perspective, which to Zakrzewska, is key to becoming an extraordinary physician. It was also the first hospital in Boston to offer gynecological and obstetrical care and the first hospital in America to offer a general training school for nurses. They offered most of their care to the poor for free or little cost by accepting donations from their supporters.

Her staff grew over the years and included such notable physicians as Drs. Mary Putnam Jacobi, Lucy E. Sewall, Ruth A. Gerry, Anita Tyng, and Henry Ingersoll Bowditch.

== Later life ==
Marie Zakrzewska sought admission into a professional medical society. One of the primary goals for women physicians was to gain acceptance by their peers and society. Admittance into a medical society was a vital way to achieve this because it would signal their social acceptance amongst their male colleagues, and thus the public. Her fellow male physicians encouraged her to apply to the Massachusetts Medical Society. Zakrzewska soon after applied for the honor. Even with the encouragement from the colleagues, they were unable to outvote her opponents. She was rejected from the professional medical society based on her gender.

Hoping to open medical schools to women, Zakrzewska, along with Emily Blackwell, Lucy Sewell, Helen Morton, Mary Putnam Jacobi, and many other women, sent a letter to Harvard University. They offered $50,000 to establish a medical program for women. The university denied this offer. Their hopes were not shaken. This offer was accepted by Johns Hopkins University and opened its doors to women the successive year.

After many hard-fought years practicing medicine and establishing accessible medical education for women, Zakrzewska retired in 1890. She spent the rest of her life consulting on projects and arranging affairs. In 1899, the main building of the hospital would be renamed the "Zakrzewska Building." Marie Zakrzewska died a few years later on May 12, 1902 in Jamaica Plain, Massachusetts due to what was thought to be a heart attack. During her service, her colleagues and friends gathered to pay their respects, reading farewell letters that Zakrzewska had written for the occasion. Her home is a site on the Boston Women's Heritage Trail.

Zakrzewska lived a successful life, breaking barriers that hindered women in practicing medicine in the United States, founded hospitals for women, and pioneered the movement that opened the nursing profession to black women with the first black nurse in America graduating from the school in 1879. As a feminist and abolitionist, she became friends with William Lloyd Garrison, Wendell Phillips and Karl Heinzen.

== Role in early playground movement ==
Marie Elizabeth Zakrzewska introduced to America the German idea to build sand gardens for children, starting in the city of Boston, inspired by the German sand gardens she observed while visiting Berlin in the summer of 1885.
