= Caroline Matilda Dodson =

American physician (1845-1898)

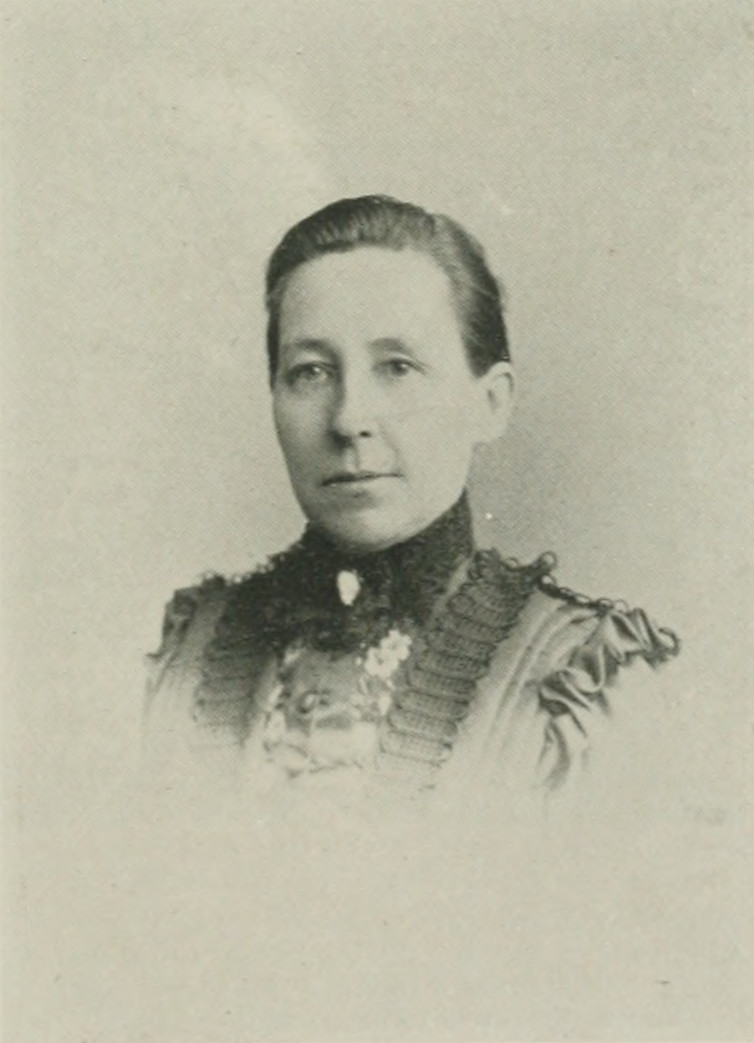
- Portrait of Dodson from "A Woman of the Century"
- Born: December 17, 1845; Keosauqua, Iowa
- Died: January 9, 1898 (aged 52); Philadelphia, Pennsylvania
- Education: Woman's Medical College of Pennsylvania
- Occupation: Physician
- Organization: National Woman's Health Association of America

Caroline Matilda Dodson (December 17, 1845 – January 9, 1898) was an American physician and a founding member of the National Woman's Health Association of America.

== Early life and education ==
Caroline Matilda Dodson was born near Keosauqua, Iowa, on December 17, 1845. Her father, Stiles Richard Dodson, was the son of Richard Dodson and Hannah Watson. Her mother, Mrs. Caroline Matilda (née Harrison) Dodson, was the daughter of Stephen Harrison and Mary Dodson. Both of her parents were descendants of Thomas and Mary Dodson and natives of Huntingdon Valley, Pennsylvania. They married in 1836. About six weeks after marriage, they left Pennsylvania for the American West and settled in Van Buren County, Iowa. Stiles R. Dodson died in 1847, leaving his widow with four daughters, the youngest less than two years of age. Her sisters were named Melvina (d. 1862), Mary, and Susan. That winter, Dodson's mother taught school in her own house. In the spring of 1848, she returned with her family to her father's house in Pennsylvania. Caroline was baptized in November, 1857, and thereafter, she was a member of the Baptist church.

Dodson was educated at home under private teachers and at the district school supplemented the early lessons from her mother. At about twelve, she was sent to an academy and normal school.

== Career ==
Dodson worked as a teacher from the winter of 1861 until the fall of 1871, when she matriculated at the Woman's Medical College of Pennsylvania, and entered upon the three-year course just inaugurated. Dr. Ann Preston was then Dean of the college. The summer of 1872, she spent in the Nurses' Training School of the Woman's Hospital of Philadelphia. After completing her coursework, Dodson earned a certificate of the Training School for Nurses. In the summer of 1873, she spent in the same hospital as student in the wards and out practice. She earned her diploma in March, 1874, and went to Ypsilanti, Michigan, for further study with Dr. Ruth A. Gerry, one of the first women to practice medicine.

After a year spent in hospital and private practice with Gerry, Dodson went to Rochester, New York, and there, in connection with a practice, opened a drug store. In 1877, her mother having gone West again, Dodson started for Iowa, going by the Hudson and Great Lakes. She lost a car load of valuables in the railroad strike at Pittsburgh, Pennsylvania.

After her trip West, Dodson returned to Philadelphia, where she performed a variety of jobs. For a time, she depended upon US$5 per week to meet the living expenses of three in her family, but offers came, and among them, unsolicited, one from the Philadelphia Society for Organizing Charity to act as superintendent of one of its districts. Dodson accepted the position, and for eight years, filled it in connection with her private practice of medicine.

=== National Woman's Health Association of America ===
As a teacher, Dodson wrote and spoke boldly for better methods of education, and advocated broadening the opportunities for study. She saw that a general movement might help to educate the masses and to spread a knowledge of self-care. To this end, after much deliberation, a call was issued for a public meeting to be held in Association Hall, Philadelphia, on July 23, 1890, and an organization was effected under the name of the National Woman's Health Association of America. The association was chartered November 1, 1890. and Dodson was elected first president. The plan of the association was broad and provided for extensive work. Its objective was to bring the medical profession into closer relation with the general public by the discussion of health topics.

== Personal life ==
Dodson read widely on subjects concerning the movements of women, speaking and writing in their interest. In 1888, at the 19th annual convention of the Pennsylvania Woman's Suffrage Association, Dodson's missionary work was noted in laudatory terms.

Dodson founded the Baptist Sisterhood in Philadelphia. She died at her home in Philadelphia, January 9, 1898, of sarcoma.
