= Lucy W. Abell =

American physician (1808–1893)

Lucy Weston Abell (1808 – 3 December 1893) was an American physician and the founder of the DC Women's Physiological Society. She was one of the first, if not the first, woman to practise homeopathy in Boston, Massachusetts.

== Life ==
Lucy Weston was born in Waltham, Massachusetts, the daughter of Zachariah Weston. She began studying medicine in 1857 at the age of 49, at the New England Female Medical College in Boston. She graduated from the Pennsylvania Medical University of Philadelphia in April 1860. Abell was described as 'one of the pioneers of her sex in the medical profession', and 'among the first women, if not the first woman, who practised homoeopathy in Boston, and, indeed, in New England'.

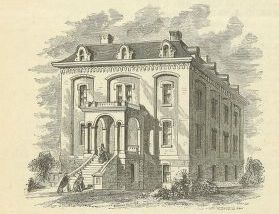
New England Female Medical College

Abell practised in Boston until 1875, when she went abroad. Returning to America in 1878, she resumed practice in Washington, D.C., where she established the Ladies Physiological Society.

In 1879, the New England Medical Gazette reported that:

A Ladies' Physiological Society has been organized in Washington, D.C., under the direction of Dr. Lucy W. Abell, formerly of Boston, but now residing in Washington. Some of the prominent ladies of Washington take an active part in this movement, which, it is thought, may eventually lead to the establishment of a Medical College for women.

The Ladies' Physiological Society provided medical treatment, education, advice and support to the poor women of Washington D.C. Abell continued to practise until 1882.

== Death and legacy ==
Abell died at home in Needham, Massachusetts on 3 December 1893 after a short illness, at the age of 85. Described in The Medical Current as 'one of the oldest women practitioners of homeopathy', an obituary in the New England Medical Gazette, published in January 1894, remembered her as 'long known and honored in Boston and elsewhere as one of the pioneers of homeopathy, and of women in medicine'. It went on to say that:

Dr. Abell's conscientious devotion to her work, kind heart and shrewd good sense, made her much trusted and loved by a large circle of friends and patients. She will be sincerely mourned.
