= Harriet Newton Phillips =

American nurse

Harriet Newton Phillips (1819-1901) was an early trained nurse in America, working during and after the Civil War.

== Biography ==
Harriet Newton Phillips was born in Pennsylvania on December 29, 1819. From October 1862 to November 1863, she worked at the hospital at Jefferson Barracks near St. Louis, Missouri, as a nurse. In 1863 she joined the Western Sanitary Commission in St. Louis, Missouri where she joined the army as a nurse. By 1864 she was working as a nurse at Benton Barracks General Hospital in St. Louis. Phillips left the army in 1864. She attended classes at the Female Medical College of the Women’s Hospital until 1864, at which point she left school to start working as a nurse. In 1869 she returned to the school, earned her diploma, and took the position of head nurse to begin training other nursing students.

From 1872 until 1875 she working in Wisconsin doing missionary work amongst the Ojibwe and Sioux tribes. Starting in 1875 she was employed at a San Francisco Presbyterian mission working with the Chinese, before returning to the Women’s Hospital to receive advanced training in 1878.

Phillips died on August 29, 1901.

== Legacy ==
Linda Richards has also been accorded the title of 'first trained nurse' in the United States.
