= New England Hospital for Women and Children =

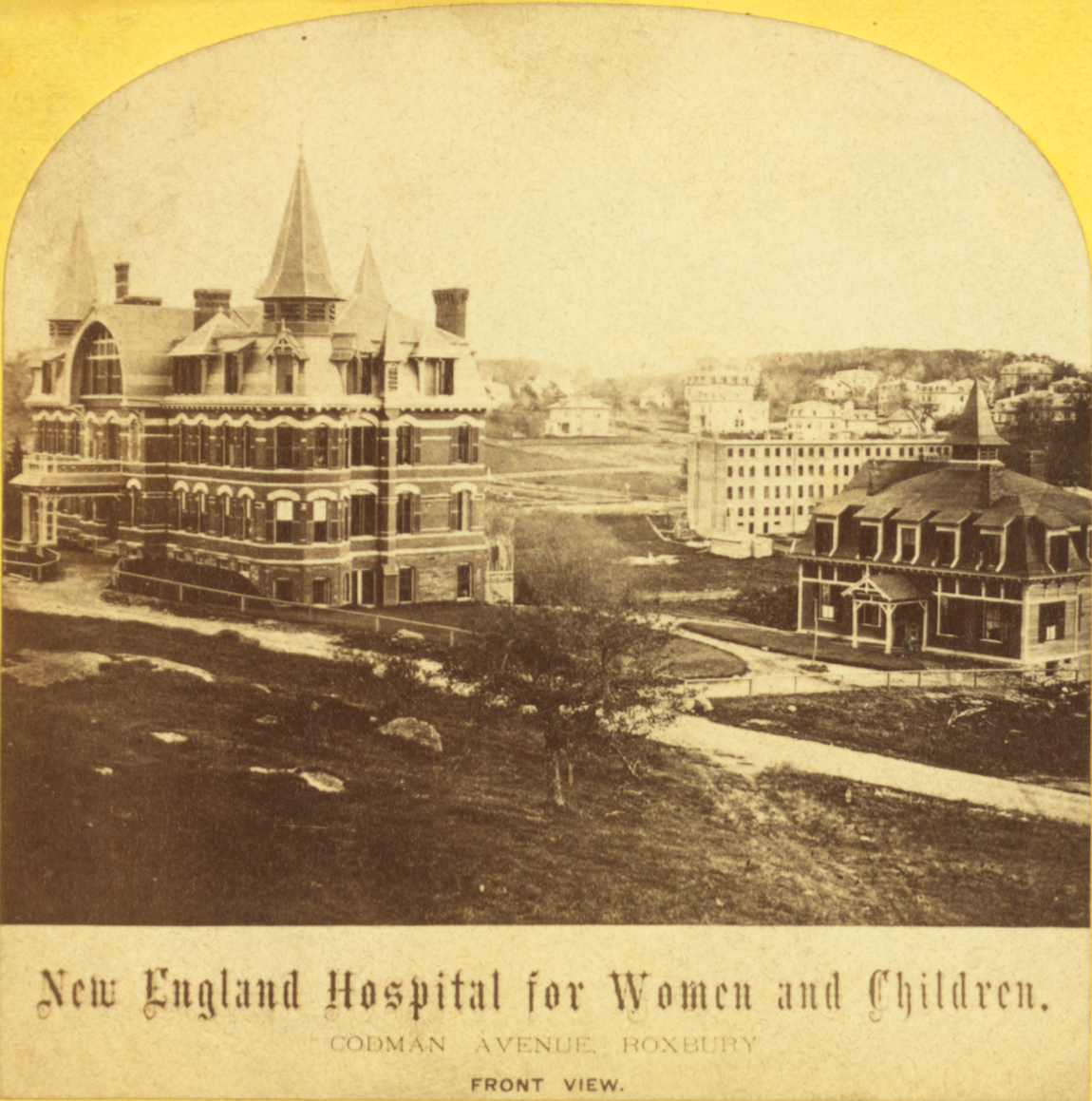

Geography
- Location: Roxbury, Massachusetts, United States
- Coordinates: 42°19′10.9″N 71°5′53.4″W

Helipads
Number	Length		Surface
Number	ft	m	Surface
			Orange Line; Bus 22, 29, 42, 44

History
- Opened: July 1, 1862

Links
- Lists: Hospitals in Massachusetts

The New England Hospital for Women and Children was founded by Marie Zakrzewska on July 1, 1862. The hospital's goal was to provide patients with competent female physicians, educate women in the study of medicine, and train nurses to care for the sick. Until 1951, the hospital remained dedicated to women, it was then renamed to New England Hospital to include male patients. The hospital was renamed again to the Dimock Community Health Center in 1969. At present, that institution provides a range of healthcare services including adult & pediatric primary care, women's healthcare, and HIV/AIDS specialty care.

== Establishment ==
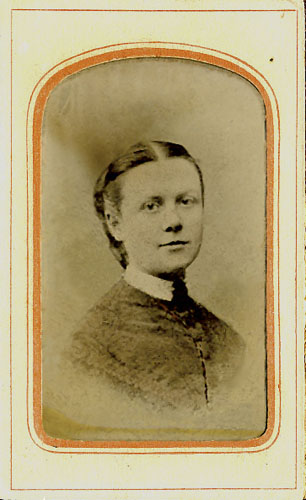
Susan Dimock

Marie Zakrzewska was born on September 9, 1829, in Berlin. In one of her memoirs she wrote "I prefer to be remembered only as a woman who was willing to work for the elevation of woman." She did just that by starting the hospital. As a child she followed her mother (a midwife) around the school of midwifery where she worked. Once she was 18 she applied to study midwifery, which was the only part of medicine women were allowed to work in, at the Royal Charité Hospital in Berlin. She was rejected, however, she continued to apply at ages 19 and 20, but was still rejected. It was only once Dr. Joseph Hermann Schmidt, who worked at the school, used his influence to get her in that she finally was able to study medicine. Later, she moved to America, where women were allowed to be doctors.

Once in New York, she met Dr. Elizabeth Blackwell, who helped her to become a doctor. The two of them opened the New York Infirmary for Women and Children on May 1, 1857. This led her to go to Boston to meet with the board at the New England Female College, where she was offered, and accepted, a position as a professor of Obstetrics, and Diseases of Women and Children and the head of the clinical program. She eventually resigned. With the help of members of the board of the New England Female College as well as Ednah D. Cheney (legal sponsor), Lucy Goddard (legal sponsor), Mrs. George G. Lee (donated $3000), and Samuel E. Sewall (donated $1000), she opened the New England Hospital for Women and Children on July 1, 1862.

== Early history ==
The goal of the hospital was "1) to provide for women medical aid of competent physicians of their own sex; 2) to assist educated women in the practical study of medicine; and 3) to train nurses for the care of the sick." Zakrzewska was devoted to providing obstetric care to all who needed it, regardless of race or economic status.

At the start of the hospital, the staff consisted of Zakrzewska, two interns, and two consulting physicians. By 1900 there was a resident physician, 54 attending, assisting, and advisory physicians, and 13 consulting physicians.

All staff and doctors that worked there were women until 1950 when a lack of money led the board to reverse the policy. The policy was again reversed in 1952 to only allow women to be on the staff. This was reversed a final time in 1962 when the by-laws were rewritten.

In 1864, the Massachusetts state legislature gave the hospital a grant of $5000, allowing it to expand down Pleasant street. The hospital also acquired property behind the hospital at the end of 1864. This allowed the hospital to split into 3 parts. A hospital, a dispensary, and an inpatient facility.

In 1865, Dr. Anita Tyng was hired as a surgeon. She was the first woman in the US to ever be listed as specializing in surgery by a hospital. She is one of the women who sent a letter to the founder of the MIT, in January 1867, requesting to "continue the study of Chemistry in the Technological Institute." Dr. Fanny Berlin, who was later appointed as the hospital's chief surgeon, was also one of the first Jewish-American women to practice surgery in the US. Dr. Ruth A. Gerry was on staff in 1865.

In 1872, the hospital moved to Codman Avenue in suburban Roxbury, and the dispensary stayed in the center of Boston. This new hospital opened a nursing school, the first in America. The first American trained nurse, Linda Richards (graduated 1873) and the first African American trained nurse, Mary Eliza Mahoney (graduated 1879) were both trained at the nursing school. The nursing school was closed in 1951.

The hospital remained dedicated to women and children until 1951 when it was renamed the New England Hospital. Part of this decision was to reflect that it was now open to men as well as women and children. The decision to open the hospital to men also resulted from its financial difficulties.

== Dimock Center ==
In 1969, the hospital was renamed again. This time it was named The Dimock Community Health Center. It was named after Susan Dimock, a resident doctor (surgeon) at the hospital who drowned in the shipwreck of the SS Schiller on May 7, 1875, when she was 28. Because of its history, the clinic's buildings are listed as a National Historic Landmark. All of the buildings at the Dimock Center are named after women.

From the center's historic nine-acre campus located in the Egleston Square section of Roxbury, Massachusetts, and several satellite locations, The Dimock Center provides access to healthcare and human services that include: Adult & Pediatric Primary Care, Women's Healthcare, Eye and Dental Care, HIV/AIDS Specialty Care, Outpatient Mental Health services, Residential Programs, The Mary Eliza Mahoney House shelter for families, pre-school, Head Start programs, after-school programs and Adult Basic Education & Workforce Training programs.

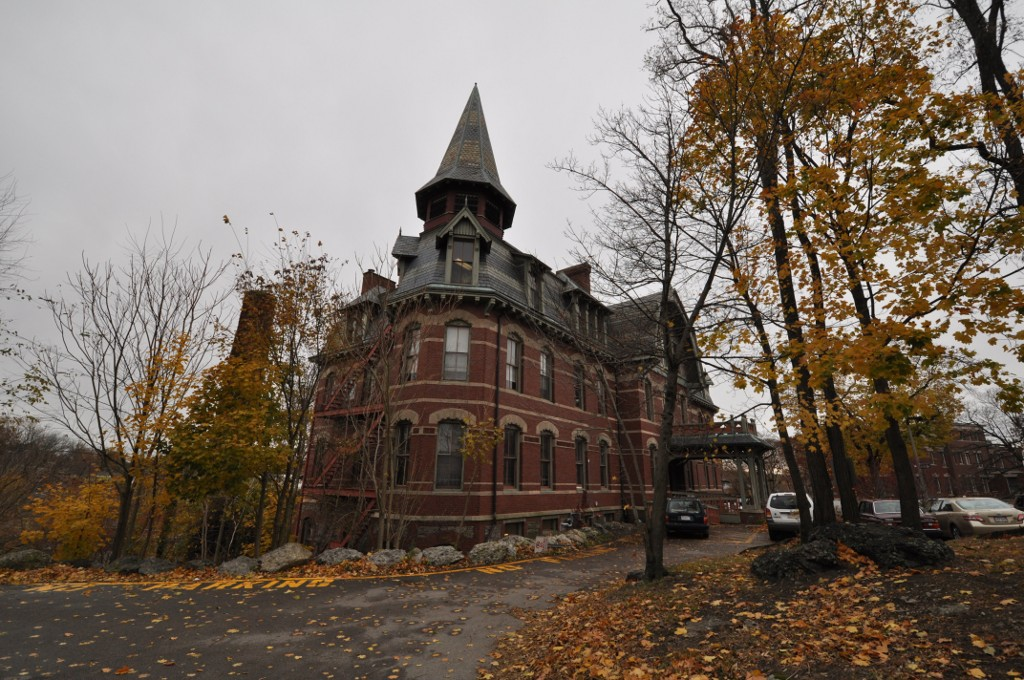
A photo of the Dimock Center in 2013 (Zakrzewska Building)

== See also ==
- Susan Dimock
- Mary Eliza Mahoney
- Hannah Myrick
- Women in medicine
- Marie Elizabeth Zakrzewska
- Helen Morton (physician)
- Ruth A. Gerry

== Sources ==
- New England Hospital for Women and Children at Sophia Smith Collection Accessed May 12, 2008
- Michael Reiskind, "Hospital Founded by Women for Women", Jamaica Plain Historical Society (1995). Accessed April 20, 2010.
- "New England Hospital for Women and Children. Records, 1914-1954 (Inclusive), 1950-1954 (Bulk): A Finding Aid." Harvard University Library, Arthur and Elizabeth Schlesinger Library on the History of Women in America, Radcliffe Institute for Advanced Study, Harvard University
- Davis, A T. "America’s first school of nursing: the New England Hospital for Women and Children." The Journal of nursing education., U.S. National Library of Medicine, Apr. 1991,
- Pula, James S. ""A Passion for Humanity" Founding the New England Hospital for Women and Children" The Polish Review, Vol. 57, No. 3, 2012
- "Changing the Face of Medicine | Marie E. Zakrzewska." U.S. National Library of Medicine, National Institutes of Health, 3 June 2015
