= SS Schiller =

German ocean liner launched in 1873

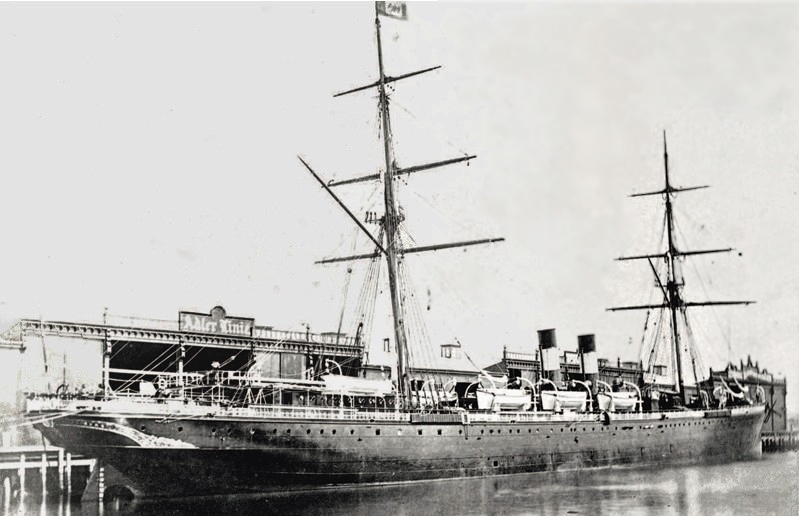

History
- Name: Schiller
- Owner: German Transatlantic Steam Navigation Line
- Route: New York-Hamburg
- Builder: Robert Napier and Sons, Glasgow, Scotland
- Launched: 26 August 1873
- Completed: August 1873
- Maiden voyage: 5 February 1874
- Fate: Wrecked 7–8 May 1875

General characteristics
- Tonnage: 3,421 gross register
- Length: 380 feet (120 m)
- Beam: 40 feet (12 m)
- Installed power: 550 nhp compound engine

SS Schiller was a 3,421-ton German ocean liner, one of the largest vessels of her time. Launched in 1873, she plied her trade across the Atlantic Ocean, carrying passengers between New York City and Hamburg for the German Transatlantic Steam Navigation Line. She became infamous on 7 May 1875, while operating on her normal route, when she hit the Retarrier Ledges in the Isles of Scilly, causing her to sink with the loss of most of her crew and passengers, totalling 335 fatalities.

== Characteristics ==
Schiller was built 380 feet (120 m) long with a 40 feet (12 m) beam in Glasgow in August 1873 for her German owners, and had plied the Atlantic routes for just two years without major incident. In addition to her load of 254 passengers, she was carrying 250 mail bags intended for Australia, highly valuable general cargo, and 300,000 $20 coins totaling approximately £1.2 million at contemporary value and over £450 million today.

The ship was engaged to sail from New York on 27 April 1875, and was to call at Plymouth and Cherbourg on her route homeward to Hamburg. She made excellent time with her combination of two masts and engines, and by 7 May, was nearing her first port of call at Plymouth on the Devon coast.

== Wreck ==
Captain Thomas needed to slow due to poor visibility in thick sea fog as she entered the English Channel, and was able to calculate that his ship was in the region of the Isles of Scilly, thus within range of the Bishop Rock lighthouse, which would provide him with information about his position. To facilitate finding the islands and the reefs that surround them, volunteers from the passengers were brought on deck to try to find the light. These lookouts unfortunately failed to see the light, which they were expecting on the starboard quarter, when in fact it was well to port. This meant that the Schiller was sailing straight between the islands on the inside of the lighthouse, leaving the ship heading towards the Retarrier Ledges.

Schiller grounded on the reef at 10 pm and sustained significant damage, but not enough in itself to sink the large ship. The captain attempted to reverse off the rocks, pulling the ship free, but exposing it to heavy seas, which flung the liner onto the rocks by its broadside three times, staving in the hull and making the ship list dangerously as the lights died and pandemonium broke out on deck as passengers fought to get into the lifeboats. It was at these boats that the real disaster began, as several were not seaworthy due to poor maintenance and others were destroyed, crushed by the ship's funnels, which fell amongst the panicked passengers. The captain attempted to restore order with his pistol and sword, but as he did so, the only two serviceable lifeboats were launched, carrying 27 people, far fewer than their full capacity. These boats eventually made it to shore, carrying 26 men and one woman.

On board the ship, the situation only became worse, as breakers washed completely over the wreck. All the women and children on board, over 50 people, were hurried into the deck house to escape the worst of the storm. There, the greatest tragedy happened, when before the eyes of the horrified crew and male passengers, a huge wave ripped off the deck house roof and swept the occupants into the sea, killing all inside. The wreck continued to be pounded all night, and gradually those remaining on board were swept away or died from exposure to cold seas, wind, and resulting hypothermia, until the morning light brought rescue for a handful of survivors.

== Rescue operation ==
The recognized manner of signaling disaster at sea was by the firing of minute guns, carried on all ships for signalling purposes. Unfortunately, it had become the custom for ships passing the islands to fire a minute gun as it passed safely through the area, so the firing of the Schiller's guns failed to produce the hoped-for rescue. Such an operation at night and in the dark would have been nearly impossible because of the high seas, thus it was not until the first light that rescue craft began arriving.

The St Agnes pilot gig, the O and M, was summoned to investigate multiple cannon shots. Her crew discovered the mast of the sinking Schiller. The O and M rowed to pick up five survivors before returning to St Agnes for assistance. Steamers and ferries from as far away as Newlyn, Cornwall, assisted the rescue operation. Of the 254 passengers and 118 crew, 37 survived. The death toll, 335, was one of the worst in British maritime history.

== Artifacts ==
The signal cannon is preserved in the Museum of the Isles of Scilly. The wreck was relocated in 1972 by Jim Heslin and Terry Hiron who were Salvors in Possession of the Association wreck of 1707. On their first dive into the engine room area Terry found an 1839 American 20$ Double Eagle which is still in his possession. They also discovered silver cutlery, a large silver coffe pot marked with 'The German Transatlantic Shipping Line' logo which was handed in the to the local custom official Eric Browne ' In later years the wreckage was investigated by Todd Stevens and Richard Larn who unfortunately had personal problems so hardly any more artifacts were actually declared to the local Museum.

== Legacy ==
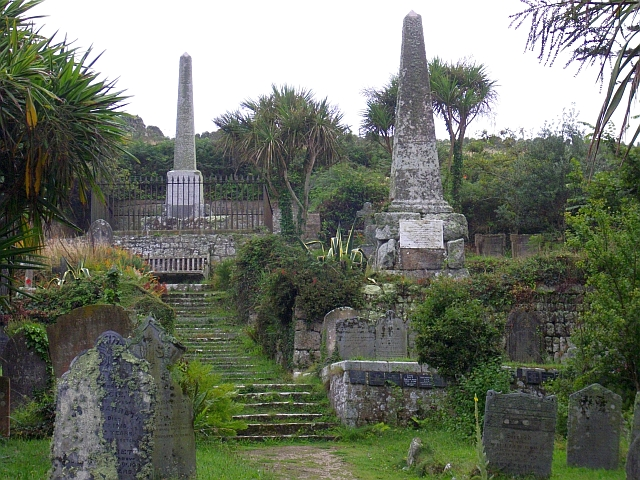
St. Mary's graveyard, Old Town: The distant obelisk on the left is in memory of Louise Holzmaister, one of the passengers on the Schiller.

In recognition of the assistance that the inhabitants of the Scilly Isles gave the German people on board, orders were given in the two World Wars to spare the Isles of Scilly from attacks by German forces.

== See also ==
- List of United Kingdom disasters by death toll
- Susan Dimock (victim)
- Joseph Schlitz (victim)
