= Ruth A. Gerry =

19th century American doctor

Ruth A. Gerry (c. 1828–December 8, 1876) was one of the first women to practice medicine as a physician in the United States. She and two others were the first women elected to the Michigan State Medical Society in 1872, which was the first year women were eligible for inclusion. As an advocate of women's medical education in Michigan, and a women's suffrage activist, she participated in training and mentoring other early female physicians, including Caroline Matilda Dodson and Seraph Frissell. Seraph Frissell began her study of medicine with Doctors Ruth Gerry and Cynthia Smith in 1872.

== Early life ==
Gerry was born in Otsego county, New York.

== Medical education and career ==
She graduated from the Woman's Medical College of Pennsylvania on March 15, 1865, at a time when the University of Michigan Medical School was not yet admitting female medical students. Her graduate thesis was on malaria. Her first position was at the New England Hospital for Women and Children prior to moving to Ypsilanti, Michigan. Dr. C. Annette Buckel directly succeeded Dr. Gerry as assistant physician at the New England Hospital for Women and Children in 1865.

After she became a physician, she lobbied the University of Michigan Medical School to start admitting women to its medical school classes. Letters published by the Ypsilanti Historical Society state that she "drove the entering wedge" for women to be admitted to the University of Michigan Medical School. She also spoke out about the negative health effects of corsets.

In 1872, she started her own hospital and established the Ladies Free Hospital Association, that she ran with Dr. Cynthia Smith. One of the hospital's specific purposes was to treat the poor. She added rooms to her own home to accommodate more patients. That same year, she, Frances A. Rutherford, and Sibelia F. Baker became the first female medical practitioners admitted to the Michigan State Medical Society.

== Death and legacy ==
On December 8, 1876 she died at the age of 48. Colleague Charles Pattison noted that "rising from a sick bed to attend a patient was her last professional work". In 1878, the Ladies Hospital Association erected a marker on her grave that read, "She hath been a succorer to many."

After her death, her daughter, and only child, Harriet received her medical degree from the University of Michigan in 1883. She became the second woman doctor to work at Harper Hospital in Michigan.

== See also ==
- Seraph Frissell
- Caroline Matilda Dodson
