= New England Female Medical College =

First school to train women in medicine

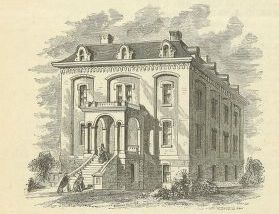
- New England Female Medical College in 1860
- Other name: NEFMC
- Active: 1848–1874 (merged into Boston University School of Medicine)
- Founder: Samuel Gregory
- Location: Boston, Massachusetts, United States

New England Female Medical College (NEFMC), originally Boston Female Medical College, was founded in 1848 by Samuel Gregory and was the first school to train women in the field of medicine. It merged with Boston University to become the Boston University School of Medicine in 1874.

== History ==
Prior to 1847 when Elizabeth Blackwell became the first woman to enroll in a United States medical school by entering the Geneva Medical College. Many women, such as Harriot Kezia Hunt, had served as family physicians, but women were denied attendance at medical lectures and examinations. Blackwell set a new standard for women everywhere, helping them gain entrance into the medical world by claiming that women had something unique to offer medicine that men could not.

The American Medical Education Society, formed in Boston in 1848, was created exclusively to promote the medical education of women. After the name was changed to the Female Medical Education Society to more accurately reflect the fact that the focus was specifically on the education of women, the Society was incorporated and officially recognized by the Massachusetts Legislature on April 30, 1850. The Society's first classes, offered under the name Boston Female Medical School, were held in the home of Boylston Medical School President Dr. Winslow Lewis. The goal of the Female Medical Education Society was to establish a medical school in Boston, complete with its own teaching hospital, to teach women midwifery and nursing with the expectation that they would treat women and children. By 1852, this school was called the New England Female Medical College. Even in a time of gender prejudice, the foundation of the College was accepted by many as it "provided women with a socially sanctioned position in a feminized occupation."

In 1851, the Female Medical Education Society discussed a merger with the Female Medical College of Pennsylvania (later the Woman's Medical College of Pennsylvania or WMCP), and briefly shared faculty with the other school. The two schools also shared a debate over which could rightfully claim to be "the first" women's medical school: the WMCP received its formal charter a month before the NEFMC, but did not begin instruction until 1850, while the NEFMC was offering regular classes beginning in late 1848. Dated from the beginning of instruction, the NEFMC is widely recognized today as the first institution in the United States to offer medical education exclusively to women.

The Massachusetts Legislature established a grant in 1855 of ten thousand dollars that were allocated toward college buildings. Additionally, the Female Medical Education Society established a goal to build a hospital in conjunction with the college by raising one hundred thousand dollars.

On May 27, 1857, by an act of the Commonwealth of Massachusetts, the Female Medical Education Society was formally reorganized as the New England Female Medical College, with the board members of the Society now serving as Trustees of the College.

In 1863, a petition made by Trustees of the NEFMC to the City Council asked that land be provided to them near the hospital in order to establish a building that could facilitate student practices; and it was granted for a significantly low price.

In 1870 the New England Female Medical College building was dedicated on a lot between East Concord and Stoughton Streets, giving the school its own home after 22 years of existence. However, the school faced growing financial constraints, and after 26 years, having granted medical degrees to 98 women, the New England Female Medical College merged with Boston University to become the co-educational Boston University School of Medicine in 1874.

== Foundation ==
The main motivation for the school’s foundation was the belief that male physicians should not generally assist in childbirth. Founder Samuel Gregory saw what he called "man-midwifery" as unnatural and improper and believed that women should be given formal medical education in order to become certified midwives and attend to their own sex.

Gregory argued that the U.S. was the only country in the world where women were dependent on men for aid in childbirth and that male midwives caused unnecessary embarrassment to women. He advocated for midwifery to become a feminine occupation exclusively in the hands of women. At the time, there was increasing support for the idea that, by dividing medical labors between the sexes (particularly giving women the role in childbirth), different departments could be more efficient and effective. Gregory argued that midwifery was a simple, mechanical routine that was acceptable for women. Furthermore, that it was beneath male physicians, and that men should be happy to hand it off to women and dedicate their time to other medical fields where they would be able to employ their full mental capacity.

Additionally, Gregory believed that females would be more likely to avoid using drugs and medical instruments during childbirth, and instead allow for nature to run its course while comforting patients, which he thought would lead to fewer fatalities during childbirth.

Although it was seen as controversial, Gregory drew support for the establishment of the first female medical college with the help of Lemuel Shattuck, Harriet Beecher Stowe, the Female Medical Education Society, and the public. The Female Medical Education Society wanted to provide education for women to become midwives, nurses, and physicians, and the public belief was that women were well adapted for being midwives as a result of their feminine nature.

== Students ==
The first term of classes began on November 1, 1848 with a class of twelve students from across New England, New York and Ohio enrolled at Boston Female Medical College. Following the next couple of terms, the number of students from across New England and other states increased to over fifty. By 1852, the college had changed its name to the New England Female Medical College in the annual reports published by the Female Medical Education Society.

On November 9, 1859 the Ladies' Medical Academy with a free clinic was established in connection with the school on Summer Street in Boston. The institution's goals were the education of interested women in medical subjects, nursing practices, midwifery, and the training of female physicians. The Ladies' Medical Academy awarded the Doctor of Medicine degree to four women in 1860, and two Diplomas in Midwifery were granted. There were some forty students in all by 1861. The Ladies Medical Academy appears to have been absorbed by New England Female Medical College shortly after its founding.

Throughout its 27 years, over 300 women attended classes and 98 women received doctoral degrees, with fewer than five students graduating each year, on average. Basic graduation requirements consisted of previous medical study, two years of attendance at NEFMC, a final thesis, and passing a final exam.

The majority of the school’s budget was provided by charitable contributions allowing for many students to be given the opportunity to study there through the Massachusetts State Scholarship Fund. This grant, which was approved for a span of five years in 1854, consisted of one thousand dollars allocated 40 students’ tuitions each year. All women applicants with proper preliminary educations were able to apply for scholarships to the college. Without a scholarship, starting tuition was $25 per term with room and board costs of $2 per week.

A list of 98 graduates of the school was published in 1905 by Harvey King.

=== Notable alumni ===
- Dr. Rebecca Davis Lee Crumpler graduated from the New England Female Medical College in 1864 and was the first African American woman to earn a medical degree.
- Dr. Mary Harris Thompson graduated in 1863 and went on to establish the Chicago Hospital for Women and Children.
- Dr Esther Hill Hawks graduated in 1857.
- Dr. Lucy W. Abell began study in 1857 and was one of the first homeopathic doctors in Massachusetts.
- Dr. Helen Morton graduated in 1862 and became an obstetrician in Paris and Boston.

== Faculty ==
From its start in 1848 until the mid-1850s, there were two faculty members whose lesson plans focused mainly on midwifery. In later years, both the curriculum and teaching staff grew, with five to seven faculty members providing a full medical education to students comparable to that of other medical schools of the time.

The 1854 Massachusetts Legislature’s grant not only provided 40 students donations for their tuitions, but the money, along with the tuition of all other students, also eventually went to the six professors that worked at the New England Female Medical College.

One of the most notable faculty members was Dr. Maria Zakrzewska who believed that young women should pursue a medical degree because of “an innate interest and talent for practicing medicine as well as the love for the science of it.”

Many, including some faculty members, saw NEFMC as inadequate and inferior to medical schools for male students. The most prominent example of this was Gregory’s opinion that scientific instruments offered little to doctors whose job is to treat a sick individual, while others, including Zakrzewska, saw these instruments as a way to study diseases and view medicine in a scientific context. Zakrzewska left the college because she disagreed with Gregory’s beliefs and insulted faculty members for being too focused on curing diseases and instead teaching students the scientific foundations of medicine.
