= Samuel Gregory =

Dr. Samuel Gregory (April 19, 1813 – March 23, 1872) was the founder of the New England Female Medical College.

Gregory was born in Guilford, Vermont, Apr 19, 1813. He graduated from Yale College in 1840, and in 1853 received the honorary Doctor of Medicine degree from Yale University and another from Penn Medical University

For several years after 1840 he was engaged in teaching, lecturing, and writing, on educational and sanitary subjects. During the Mexican–American War he wrote his only historical work, History of Mexico.

In 1847 he began the special work which engrossed his attention for the rest of his life, the medical education of women and their introduction into the profession. In 1848 he was prominent in starting the New England Female Medical College, in Boston, said to be the first institution of the kind in the world. He continued to be the secretary of this institution until his death, and had the satisfaction of seeing it firmly established. He died in Boston, Massachusetts of consumption, March 23, 1872. He was unmarried.

== Books and publications ==
- Samuel Gregory. (1847) History of Mexico: Boston: F. Gleason.
- Samuel Gregory. (1847) Man-midwifery Exposed and Corrected: New York: Fowlers & Wells.
- Samuel Gregory. (1850) Letter to Ladies in Favor of Female Physicians. Boston: Female Medical Education Society.
- Samuel Gregory, MD. (1864) Female Physicians. Boston: New England Female Medical College.
- Samuel Gregory, MD. (1868) Doctor or Doctress? Boston: Trustees of New England Female Medical College.
