= Susan Dimock =

American physician

- Tintype photograph of Susan Dimock.
- Born: April 24, 1847; Washington, North Carolina
- Died: May 7, 1875 (aged 28); Isles of Scilly
- Cause of death: Shipwreck of the SS Schiller
- Education: University of Zurich, 1871
- Occupation: Physician

Susan Dimock (April 24, 1847 – May 7, 1875) was an American medical doctor who earned her medical degree from the University of Zurich in 1871 and was subsequently appointed resident physician of the New England Hospital for Women and Children in 1872. The hospital, now known as the Dimock Community Health Center, was renamed in her honor after her death in the shipwreck of the SS Schiller in 1875.

Dimock is also remembered for becoming the first woman member of the North Carolina Medical Society.

== Early life and education ==
Susan Dimock was born on April 24, 1847 in Washington, North Carolina, the daughter of Henry Dimock and Mary Malvina Dimock (née Owens). She was a descendent of Thomas Dimock, who emigrated from England to Dorchester, Massachusetts in 1637 and later resettled in Barnstable, Massachusetts. Susan Dimock was a distant cousin of Ira Dimock (1827–1917), a silk manufacturer, and was also related to Henry F. Dimock, a New York City attorney associated with the Whitney family. Dimock's father, who was a native of Limington, Maine, was appointed headmaster of Roxbury High School in 1831, and was entirely self-educated. Later, he moved to North Carolina, where he taught school, studied law, was admitted to the bar association, and served as editor of the North State Whig. Dimock's mother was also a schoolteacher and supplemented their income by managing a hotel.

After her father died in 1863, Susan Dimock was homeschooled by her mother. At the close of the American Civil War, she moved with her mother to Sterling, Massachusetts, to be closer to relatives. There, she attended a girls' school, before relocating to Hopkinton, where Dimock undertook an ambitious reading of medical texts provided by a female doctor through Elizabeth "Bessie" Greene, the daughter of Boston reformer and anarchist William Batchelder Greene. In the fall of 1865, she taught school at Hopkinton, Massachusetts.

On January 10, 1866, Dimock entered the New England Hospital for Women and Children, where she began to learn medicine by close observation in the wards and dispensary. She was also permitted to attend clinical rounds at Massachusetts General Hospital, and those of the Eye and Ear Infirmary.

== Career ==
When her application to Harvard Medical School was rejected, Dimock applied to medical schools in Europe and was admitted to the University of Zurich in Switzerland in 1868. She graduated with high honors in 1871 and her thesis was published the same year. During the final years of her studies, she lived with the family of her friend, fellow physician Marie Heim-Vögtlin, where she was reportedly very happy.

Despite her unstable financial situation, Dimock decided to go to Vienna with fellow Zurich medical graduate Marie Bokowa for a few months, where she met Auguste Forel and C. E. Hoestermann. Dimock, Bokowa, Forel, and Hoestermann called themselves the Wiener Quartett (Vienna quartet) and planned on meeting again in July 1875 in Zurich. After her clinical studies in Vienna and Paris, Dimock returned to the United States.

As the all-male North Carolina Medical Society would only grant her honorary membership, Dimock rejoined the New England Hospital for Women and Children, where she was appointed resident physician on August 20, 1872. She greatly improved and increased the service of the hospital, in the course of which she opened the first graded school of nursing in the United States on September 1, 1872. She worked as a surgeon, developed a private practice in obstetrics and gynecology, and performed a number of important surgical operations, a number of which were mentioned in contemporary medical journals.

== Death and legacy ==
In May 1875, Dimock and two of her closest friends, Caroline Crane and Bessie Greene, boarded the iron steamship SS Schiller, bound from New York to Plymouth and Hamburg. On 7 May 1875, Dimock, Greene, and Crane were among the 335 people who lost their lives when the SS Schiller hit the Retarrier Ledges off the Isles of Scilly near the Bishop Rock lighthouse in heavy fog. Dimock was 28 years old at the time of her death.

In reference to her relationship and final moments with Greene, Dimock's biographer wrote, "They were lovely in their lives and in death they were not divided."

Her gravestone at Forest Hills Cemetery, Boston, reads: "Susan Dimock. Surgeon and physician to the New England Hospital for Women and Children. Lost in the steamer Schiller on the Scilly rocks. May 8 [sic], 1875".

"At the time of her death, her loss was considered irreparable, as there were few, if any, among her sex endowed with the skill and qualified by the requisite training to take her place." - The National Cyclopaedia of American Biography, XIX:30 (1926)

In 1939, the North Carolina Department of Conservation and Development erected a historic marker in her honor. In 1996, the original marble gravestone was moved from Boston to St. Peter's Episcopal Church cemetery in Washington, North Carolina, because a group in Boston decided to replace it with a granite replica.

The New England Hospital for Women and Children, where Susan Dimock trained and worked, now bears her name as the Dimock Center, a multiservice agency including Dimock Community Health Center, behavioral health residential programs, and child and family services.

== See also ==
- Sophia Jex-Blake
- Elizabeth Blackwell
- Elizabeth Garrett Anderson
- Linda Richards, America's first trained nurse, trained by Dimock at New England Hospital for Women and Children
