= Loula Roberts Platt =

American suffragist (1863–1934)

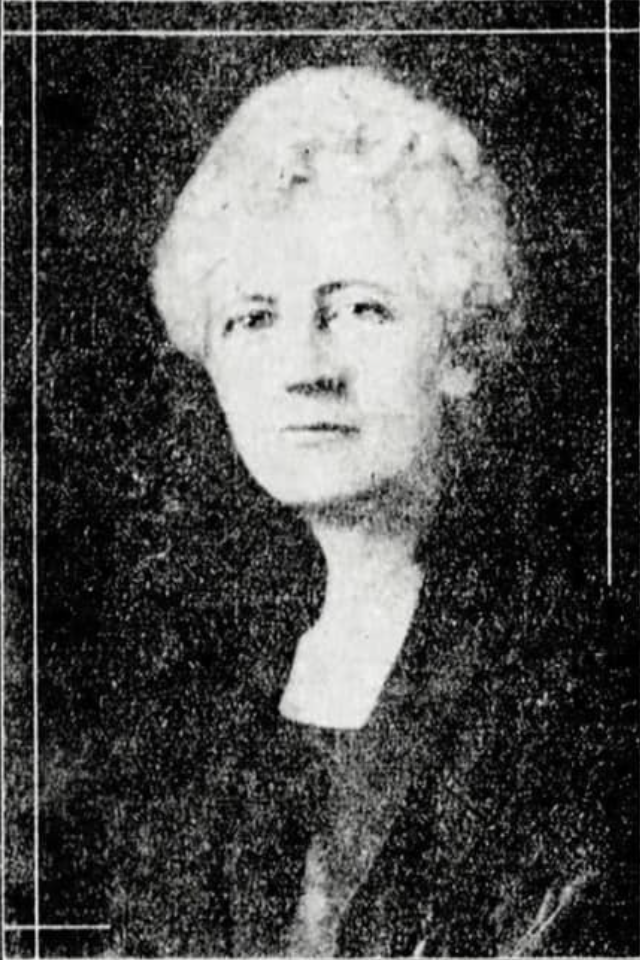

President of the Equal Suffrage League of North Carolina

President of the Suffrage League of Asheville

Personal details
- Born: Loula E. Roberts; October 14, 1863 Buncombe County, North Carolina, U.S.
- Died: December 27, 1934 (aged 71) Asheville, North Carolina, U.S.
- Resting place: Riverside Cemetery
- Party: Democratic
- Spouse: Charles Malcom Platt (1888-1898; his death)
- Parent(s): Goodson McDaniel Roberts; Frances Ray
- Education: Asheville Female College; The Pennington Seminary; Cornell University
- Occupation: activist, hotelier, socialite, writer, politician

Loula E. Roberts Platt (October 14, 1863 – December 27, 1934), also known as Lulu Platt and Mrs. Charles M. Platt, was an American suffragist, socialite, hotelier and political candidate. She was a founding member of the Equal Suffrage League of North Carolina, serving as vice president and president, and a founding member of the Suffrage League of Asheville, serving as chairwoman and president. In 1922, Platt campaigned as a Democrat for a seat in the North Carolina Senate, becoming the first woman to run for a senate seat in North Carolina and the second woman, following Lillian Exum Clement, to run for a seat in the North Carolina General Assembly.

== Early life and education ==
Platt was born Loula E. Roberts on October 14, 1863, in Buncombe County, North Carolina to Captain Goodson McDaniel Roberts, an officer in the Confederate States Army, and Frances Ray Roberts.

She was educated at Asheville Female College in North Carolina and The Pennington Seminary and Female Collegiate Institute in New Jersey. She enrolled in a special course at Cornell University.

== Later life ==
On May 17, 1888, she married Charles Malcom Platt, a lawyer from Syracuse, New York, at the residence of Captain W.B. Trov in Asheville, North Carolina. Upon their marriage, she moved with her husband to Franklin. Her husband died in 1898.

To support herself as a widow, Platt opened an inn called The Manor at Albemarle Park in Asheville in 1899. The Manor was located along a streetcar line and had steam heat, electric lights, and fireplaces. Platt operated the inn until at least 1930. She authored a cookbook titled Queen of Appalachia in memory of her grandmother, Nancy Alexander.

She lived at Buncombe Hall in Asheville. In January 1928, she hosted a club benefit bridge party at her home to raise money for the women's clubhouse. Platt was a prominent socialite known for hosting balls and tea dances and was described in the Asheville Citizen-Times as "one of the most popular members of society." She was a member of the Daughters of the American Revolution and the United Daughters of the Confederacy and served as the chairwoman of the local O. Henry Memorial Movement.

=== Activism and politics ===
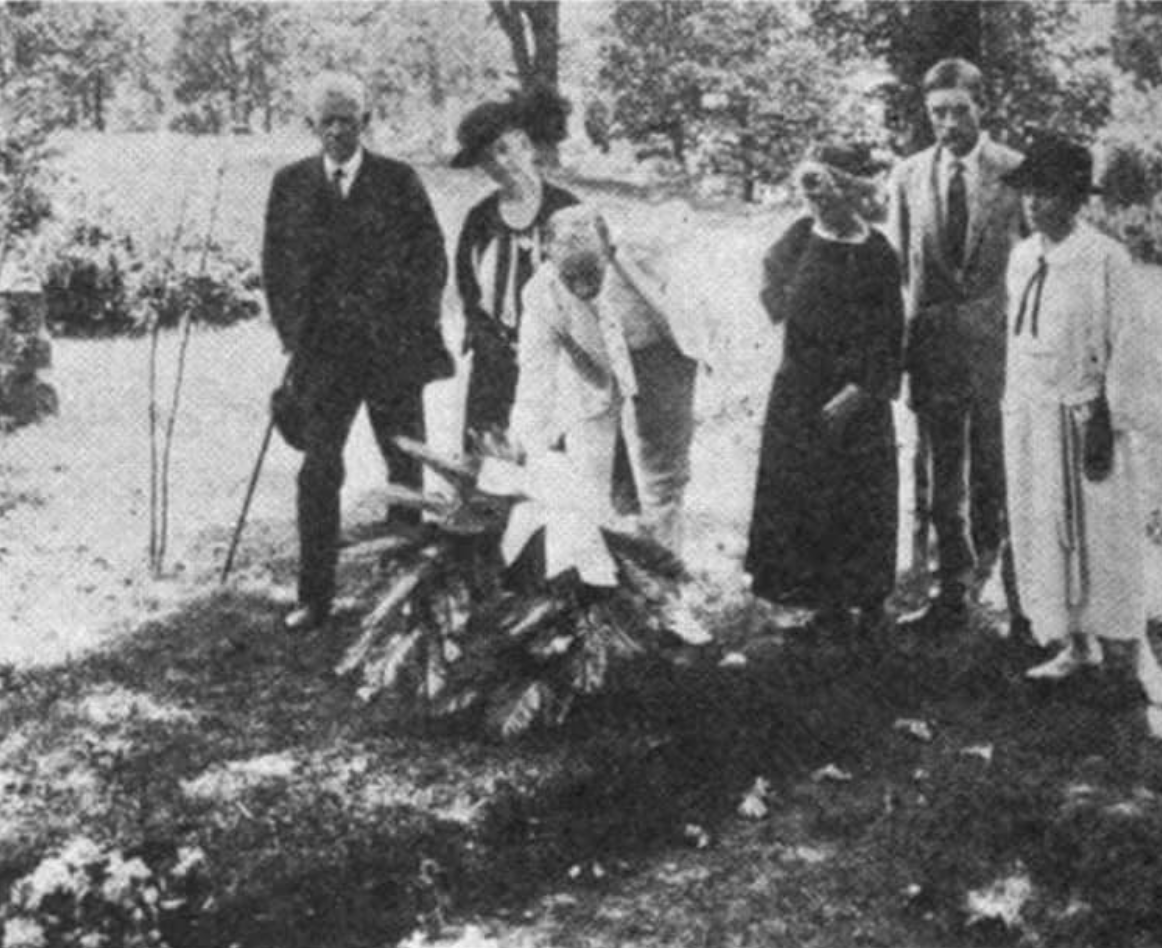
Archibald Henderson, Loula Roberts Platt, Judge Thomas A. Jones, Mrs. William Sidney Porter, Dr. Pinckney Herbert, and Mrs. Fagg Malloy at a wreath-laying ceremony for the poet O. Henry in 1922.

She was an influential leader of the suffrage movement in North Carolina from 1913 to 1920.

She was a founding member of the Equal Suffrage League of North Carolina and served as vice president. She was reelected to a second term in the league in July 1914 and, in 1915, she was elected president. She was also a founding member of the Suffrage League of Asheville, serving as chairwoman and later serving four terms as the league's president.

In 1920, she attended the annual state convention of the North Carolina Equal Suffrage League in Greensboro. When the Nineteenth Amendment to the United States Constitution passed, granting women the right to vote, Platt received an engraved plaque with the signature of Carrie Chapman Catt, former president of the National American Woman Suffrage Association.

Platt was engaged in public affairs, presenting speeches and hosting fundraising campaigns in support of women's suffrage. In December 1919, she spoke before members of the Kiwanis Club in Asheville.

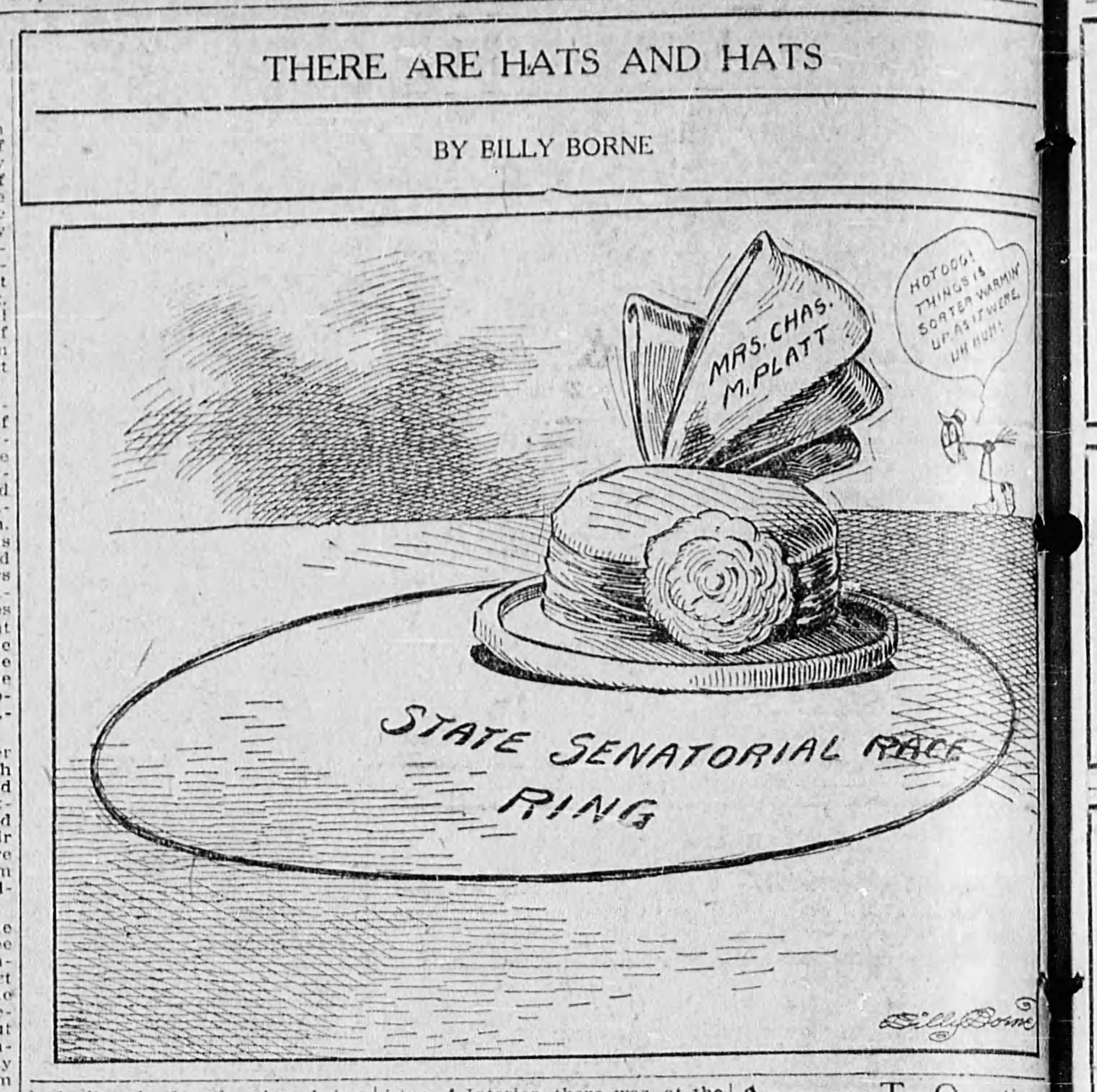
Political cartoon announcing Platt's candidacy (putting her "hat in the ring") for NC Senate by Billy Borne for the Asheville Citizen, January 23, 1922.

In 1920, Platt served as one of five women delegates to the State Democratic Convention. She canvassed in North Carolina's 10th congressional district in 1920 and gave speeches in every precinct.

In 1922, she announced her candidacy for the North Carolina Senate, becoming the first woman to run for the Democratic nomination as a state senator. She lost the election.

== Death ==
Platt died on December 27, 1934, in Asheville. She was buried next to her husband, on December 29, 1934, in Riverside Cemetery.

== See also ==
- Lillian Exum Clement, the first woman elected to the North Carolina House of Representatives, in 1920
- Gertrude Dills McKee, first woman elected to the North Carolina State Senate, in 1930
