= Andrew Dickson (disambiguation) =

Andrew Dickson is a British composer.

Andrew Dickson may also refer to:

- Andrew Flinn Dickson (1825–1879), American minister and author
- Andy Dickson, musician in The Narcs
- Andrew Dickson (politician)

== See also ==
- Andrew Dixon (disambiguation)
- Andrew Wilson-Dickson, British composer
