= Andrew Dixon =

Andrew Dixon may refer to:

- Andrew Dixon (As the World Turns), a character on the American soap opera As the World Turns
- Andrew Dixon (rugby league) (born 1990), English rugby league player
- Andy Dixon (born 1979), Canadian artist and musician
- Andy Dixon (footballer) (born 1968), former English footballer

== See also ==
- Andrew Dickson (disambiguation)
- Andrew Graham-Dixon (born 1960), British art historian and broadcaster
