= Asheville Female College =

Women's college in North Carolina (1841–1901)

Coordinates: 35.5946°N 82.5535°W

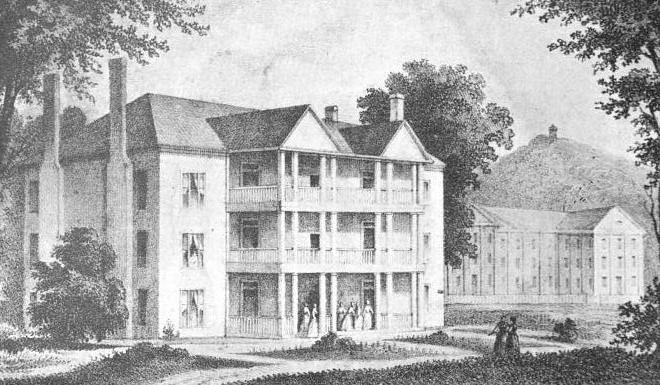
- Asheville Female College, as it appeared in 1856, when it was known as the Holston Conference Female College
- Former names: Asheville Female Seminary; Holston Conference Female College; Asheville College for Girls and Young Women
- Location: Asheville, North Carolina, U.S.

The Asheville Female College was the first institution of higher education in the western portion of North Carolina. Located in Asheville, it was active from 1841 until 1901.

== History ==
The Asheville Female College founded as the Asheville Female Seminary in 1841 by John Dickson, M.D. and Rev. Erastus Rowley, D.D. The school had its first quarters on the corner of Patton Avenue and Church Street in Asheville, North Carolina.

Between 1851 and 1855 the school became the property of the Holston Conference of the Methodist Church and its name was changed to the Holston Conference Female College. It found a home in other buildings on what later became its permanent campus, a 7-acre (2.8 ha) grove almost in the heart of Asheville. A scholarship program was created to increase attendance, which succeeded, but caused a financial problem. In the summer of 1855, Rev. Anson W. Cummings became president of the college and successfully offset the scholarship funding by increasing charges for the music and art departments. The school had nearly 200 students until the Civil War, when it was temporarily closed.

After the Civil War, the property was purchased by a stock company and sold to Rev. James Atkins Jr. The college was renamed Asheville Female College. A newer building was built by the president Rev. James Atkins, A.M., D.D, and J. A. Branner in 1888.

With the growth of buildings and equipment there was corresponding growth in the breadth of the curriculum and in those departments which but for the impartation of the various accomplishments which so generally adorn the young women of the day. The personnel and equipment for teaching music, art in various forms, elocution, modern languages, physical culture, etc., were of a high order. On these accounts, together with the unparalleled climate of Asheville, women from twenty-three states, many of them very remote, sought admittance to the college. The school came to attract quite a number of pupils from the North and North-west United States, so that the patronage was much more cosmopolitan in its character than perhaps of any other school in the South. In the first fifty-two years of its history it had matriculated more than eight thousand pupils, most of whom went on to lend the skills of an educated and accomplished womanhood to the homes and circles of which they became a part.

== Notable faculty ==
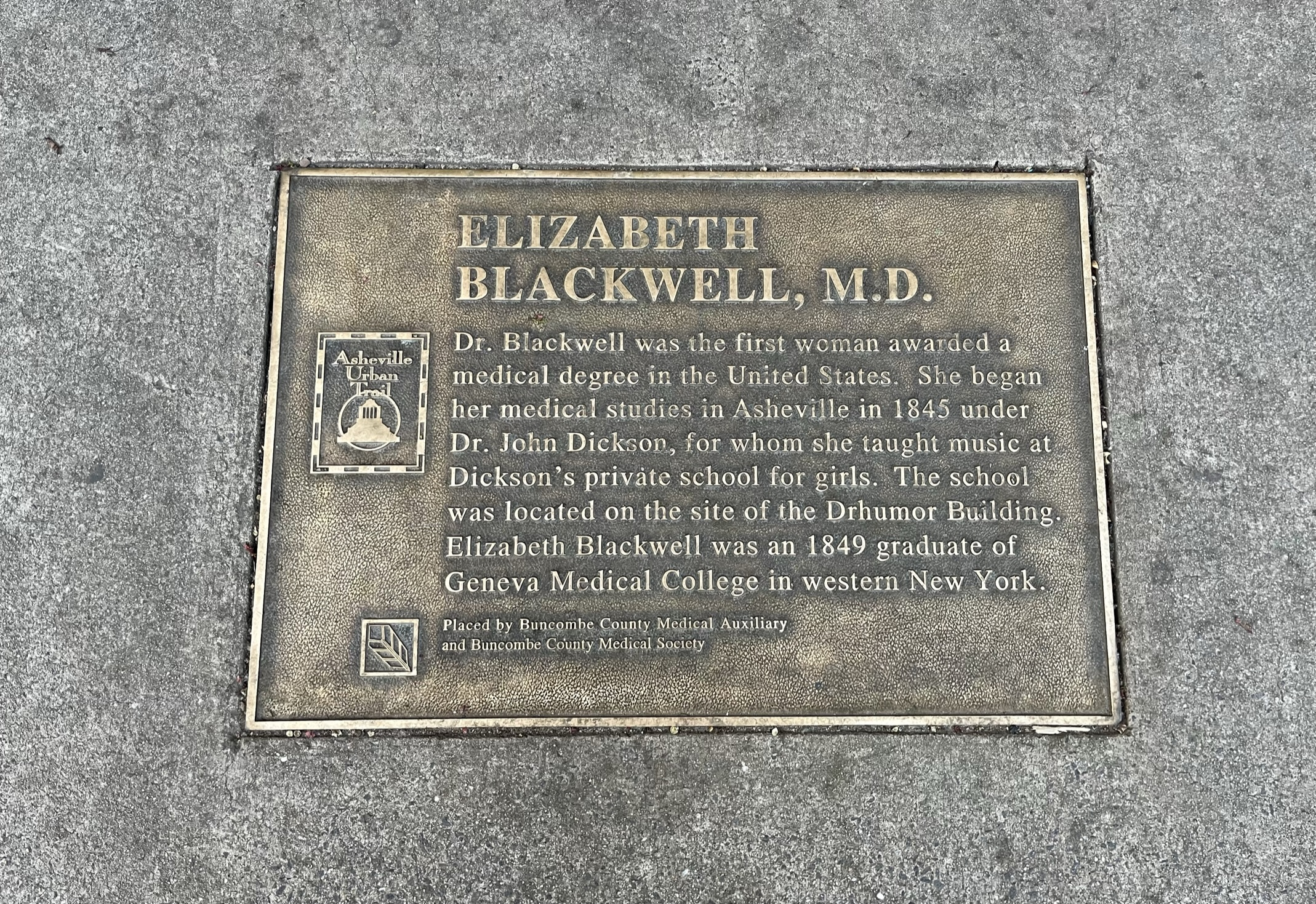
A plaque commemorating Elizabeth Blackwell's medical studies and teaching in Asheville, North Carolina

- Elizabeth Blackwell, music department

== Notable alumnae ==
- Ella Henrietta Davidson Morrison, philanthropist and NC Regent of the Daughters of the American Revolution
- Loula Roberts Platt, suffragist and first woman to run for North Carolina Senate
- Lula Vollmer, writer of stories, plays, and radio shows including works adapted to film

== See also ==
- East Tennessee Female Institute
