= John Dickson (physician) =

American physician (1795–1847)

- Born: November 4, 1795; Charleston, South Carolina, U.S.
- Died: September 28, 1847 (aged 51); Asheville, North Carolina, U.S.
- Resting place: First Presbyterian Church, Asheville, North Carolina, U.S.
- Occupations: Physician and minister
- Spouse: Mary Augusta Finn (m. 1821) Louise O'Hear (m. 1839)
- Children: 7

John Augusta Dickson (November 4, 1795 – September 28, 1847) was an American medical doctor and Presbyterian minister. In 1841, he established Asheville Female Seminary, later known as Asheville Female College, in Asheville, North Carolina.

== Early life ==
Dickson was born in 1795 in Charleston, South Carolina, to Samuel Dickson and Mary Neilson. His parents emigrated from Scotland, via Belfast, prior to the American Revolution. He was one of their five known children born between 1785 and 1805, alongside Alexander, William, Samuel, Sarah (who died in infancy) and Sarah E.

He graduated from Yale College in 1814 (having studied under Dr. John McKay from his sophomore year), after which he taught in Charleston and Columbia, South Carolina. In 1820, he undertook a one-year theology course at Andover Theological Seminary.

== Career ==
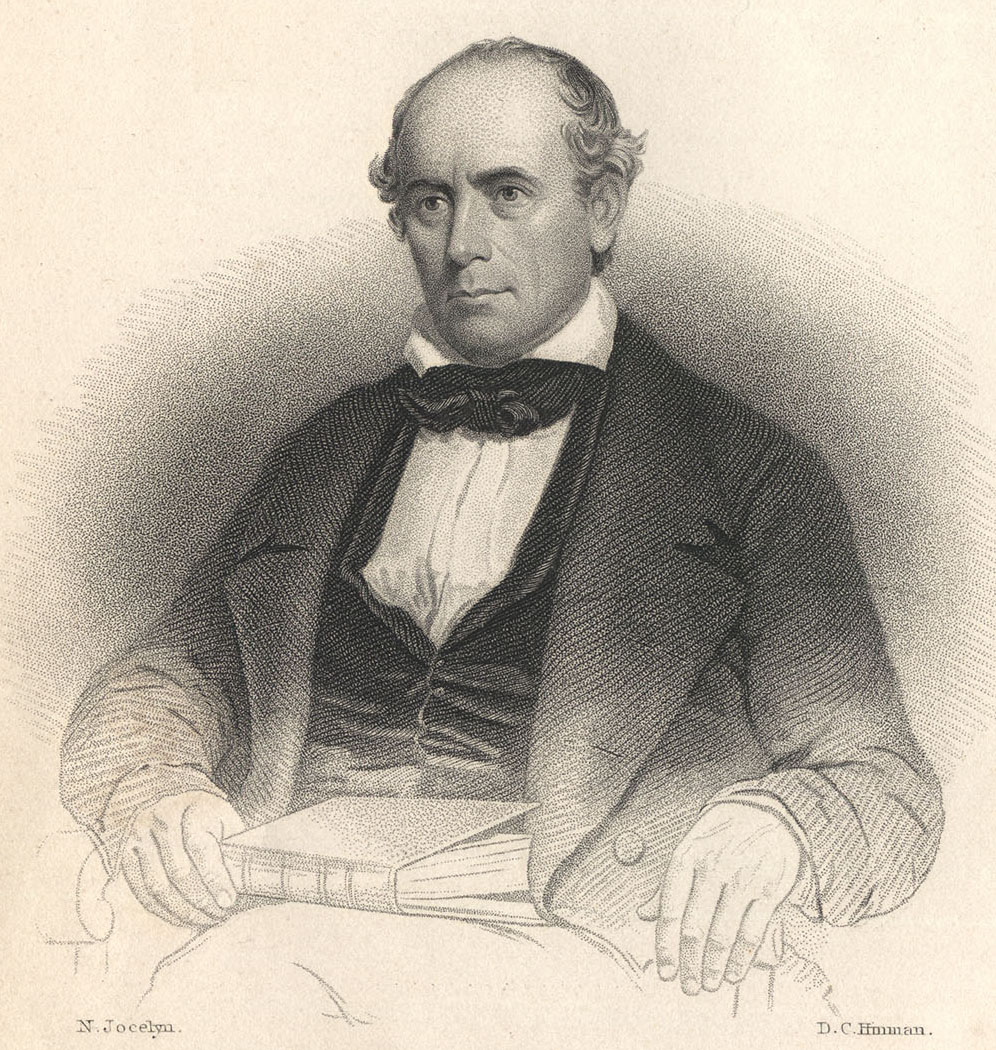
Geologist Dr. Elisha Mitchell

In 1821, Dickson became professor of languages at the College of Charleston, before becoming its chair of moral philosophy. He became ordained in 1825, though his weak lungs meant he could fulfil a pastoral role. Indeed, his health later forced him to give up preaching and teaching, instead taking up studying with his physician brother, Samuel.

Dickson was a professor at Smith's College in Asheville, North Carolina. It was in that city that he established, in 1841, Asheville Female Seminary, the first school for women in Buncombe County. He also taught at Asheville Male Academy.

While living in the mountains of North Carolina during his later life, Dickson joined forces with Dr. Elisha Mitchell to determine the highest of the Black Mountains' peaks.

== Personal life ==
In 1821, Dickson married twice: firstly to Mary Augusta Flinn, who was ten years his junior. With her, he had six known children between 1823 and 1835: Mary, Andrew, John, Samuel, Henry and Charles. Andrew and Henry became ministers; Samuel, a doctor.

In 1832, Dickson and his family moved to the mountains of western North Carolina, where he practiced medicine and partook in ministry and education. He built a home in Asheville, at the intersection of Biltmore Avenue and Saint Dunstan's Road. It was there that Elizabeth Blackwell lived and taught music. She became interested in medicine, and learned from Dickson. After studying in Charleston with Samuel Dickson, Blackwell went on to become the first woman allowed into the medical field in the United States.

Three years after Mary's 1836 death, Dickson married Louise O'Hear, with whom he had a daughter, Sarah, in 1841.

Dickson was the assistant minister of Asheville's First Presbyterian Church between 1843 and 1845.

== Death ==
Dickson died, aged 51, in 1847 in Asheville, where his children Andrew, Henry and Sarah lived with their families. It is believed he was interred beneath the annex the First Presbyterian Church, although his remains may have later been moved to Riverside Cemetery.
