= Ella Morrison =

American socialite and philanthropist

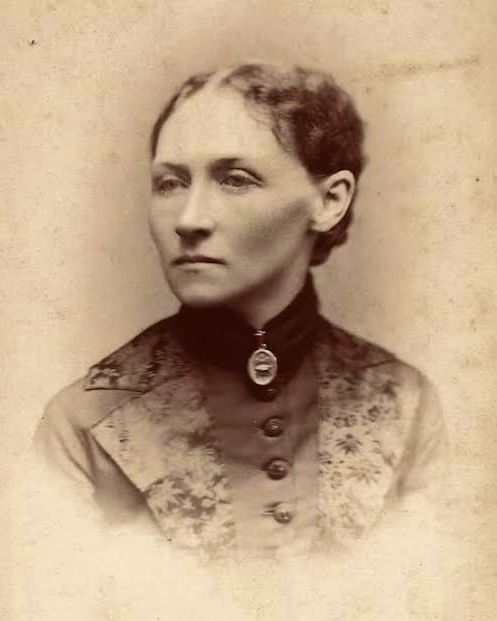

North Carolina State Regent of the Daughters of the American Revolution
- In role 1917–1919

Personal details
- Born: Ella Henrietta Davidson; March 30, 1851 Murphy, North Carolina, U.S.
- Died: December 4, 1939 (aged 88) Asheville, North Carolina, U.S.
- Resting place: Riverside Cemetery
- Spouse: Theodore Summey Morrison
- Parent(s): Allen Turner Davidson; Elizabeth Adeline Howell
- Education: Asheville Female College
- Occupation: philanthropist socialite

Ella Henrietta Davidson Morrison (March 30, 1851 – December 4, 1939) was an American socialite and philanthropist who served as North Carolina state regent for the Daughters of the American Revolution.

== Early life and family ==
Morrison was born Ella Henrietta Davidson on March 30, 1851 in Murphy, North Carolina. A member of a prominent Western North Carolina family that was involved in local law, politics, and business endeavors, she was the daughter of Colonel Allen Turner Davidson and Elizabeth Adeline Howell Davidson. Her father was an attorney and bank president in Cherokee County prior to the Civil War, at which time served in the Confederate Congress. Following the war, her family moved to Asheville.

She was educated at Asheville Female College.

== Philanthropy ==
Morrison was part of a group of women who helped establish Mission Hospital and served on the hospital board and as president for eleven years. During her term as president, a training school for nurses was established at the hospital.

She was a member of the Daughters of the American Revolution and served as North Carolina state regent from 1917 to 1919. She assisted John Preston Arthur in creating his book Western North Carolina: A History (From 1730 to 1913).

== Personal life and death ==
In June 1877, she married Theodore Morrison. They spent their early married years residing at the Alexander Hotel before moving to a house on Pearson Drive in Asheville.

She died at her home in Asheville on December 4, 1939, and was buried at Riverside Cemetery.
