= Elisha Mitchell =

American geologist and educator (1793–1857)

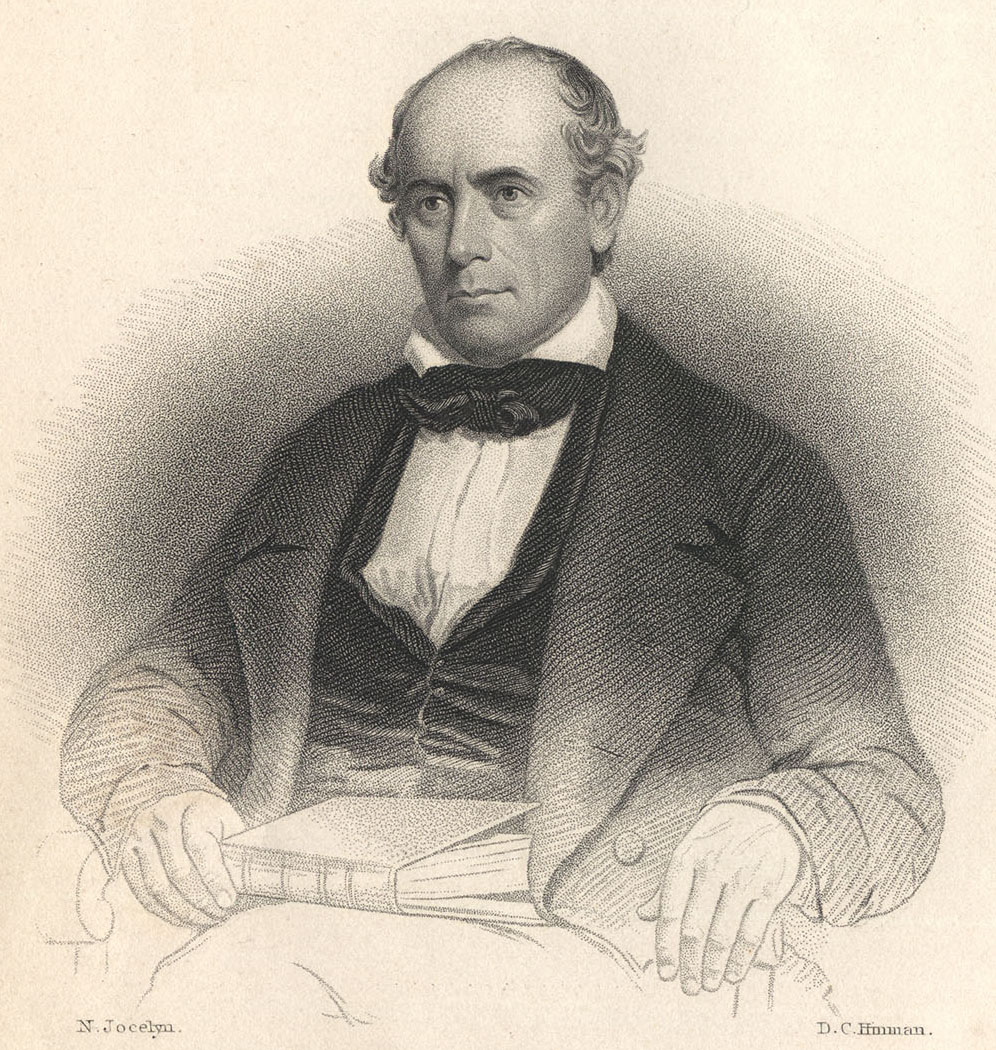
- Portrait of Rev. Elisha Mitchell, 1858
- Born: August 19, 1793; Washington, Connecticut, U.S.
- Died: June 27, 1857 (aged 63); Yancey County, North Carolina, U.S.
- Education: Yale University
- Known for: Proving Mt. Mitchell was highest mountain east of the Mississippi River. Acting President of the University of North Carolina
- Scientific career
- Fields: Chemist, geologist
- Workplaces: University of North Carolina

Signature
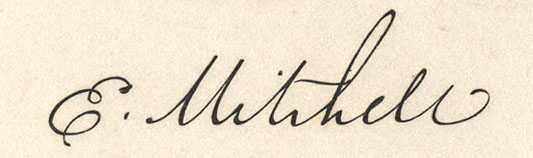

Elisha Mitchell (August 19, 1793 – June 27, 1857) was an American educator, geologist and Presbyterian minister. His geological studies led to the identification of North Carolina's Mount Mitchell as the highest peak in the United States east of the Mississippi River.

== Early life ==
Mitchell was born August 19, 1793, in Washington, Connecticut. He was graduated from Yale University in 1813, where he studied under chemist Benjamin Silliman, whose courses would shape his own teaching career.

== Mitchell at the University of North Carolina ==
Mitchell began his career as a professor at the University of North Carolina at Chapel Hill in 1818, teaching math and natural philosophy. In 1825, he began teaching geology - the field with which he would be primarily associated for the rest of his life. In addition to teaching, Mitchell also served as the university's bursar, accountant, and acting president at various times; he also led chapel services, as he had been ordained by the Presbytery of Orange in Hillsborough, North Carolina, in 1821.

== Discovery of "Mount Mitchell" ==
With assistance from Dr. John Dickson, Mitchell completed a geographical survey of North Carolina in 1828 and observed a peak in the Black Mountains he believed to be higher than Grandfather Mountain, at that time thought to be the highest in the region. In 1835, he first measured the height of this mountain, at the time known as Black Dome. Through subsequent measurements in 1838 and 1844, Mitchell proved it was higher than New Hampshire's Mount Washington, establishing the peak as the highest above sea level in the Eastern U.S.

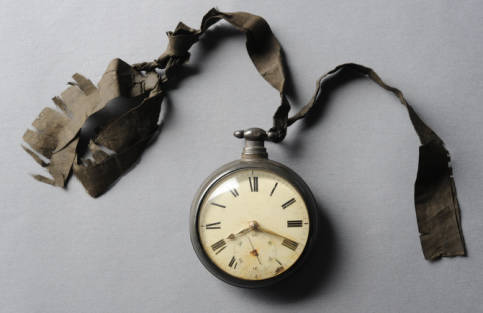
Watch belonging to Elisha Mitchell, which broke during his fatal fall and shows his exact time of death. North Carolina Collection, Wilson Special Collections Library, University of North Carolina at Chapel Hill, 2012

== Findings challenged ==
Elisha Mitchell fell to his death at nearby Mitchell Falls in 1857, having returned to verify his earlier measurements, which had been challenged by state senator Thomas Clingman, a former student of Mitchell's. Clingman's favorite for the highest peak was "Smoky Dome," a summit that was eventually measured to be just 41 feet shorter than Mitchell's "Black Dome." "Smoky Dome," now Kuwohi, was named Clingmans Dome for Thomas Clingman after his measurements were confirmed, until September 18, 2024.

Mitchell was originally buried in Asheville, but was reinterred in a tomb on the mountain in 1858. In 1881–82 the U.S. Geological Survey upheld Mitchell's measurements and officially named his peak Mt. Mitchell. At 6,684 feet or 2,037 meters high, Mt. Mitchell is the highest point east of the Mississippi River.

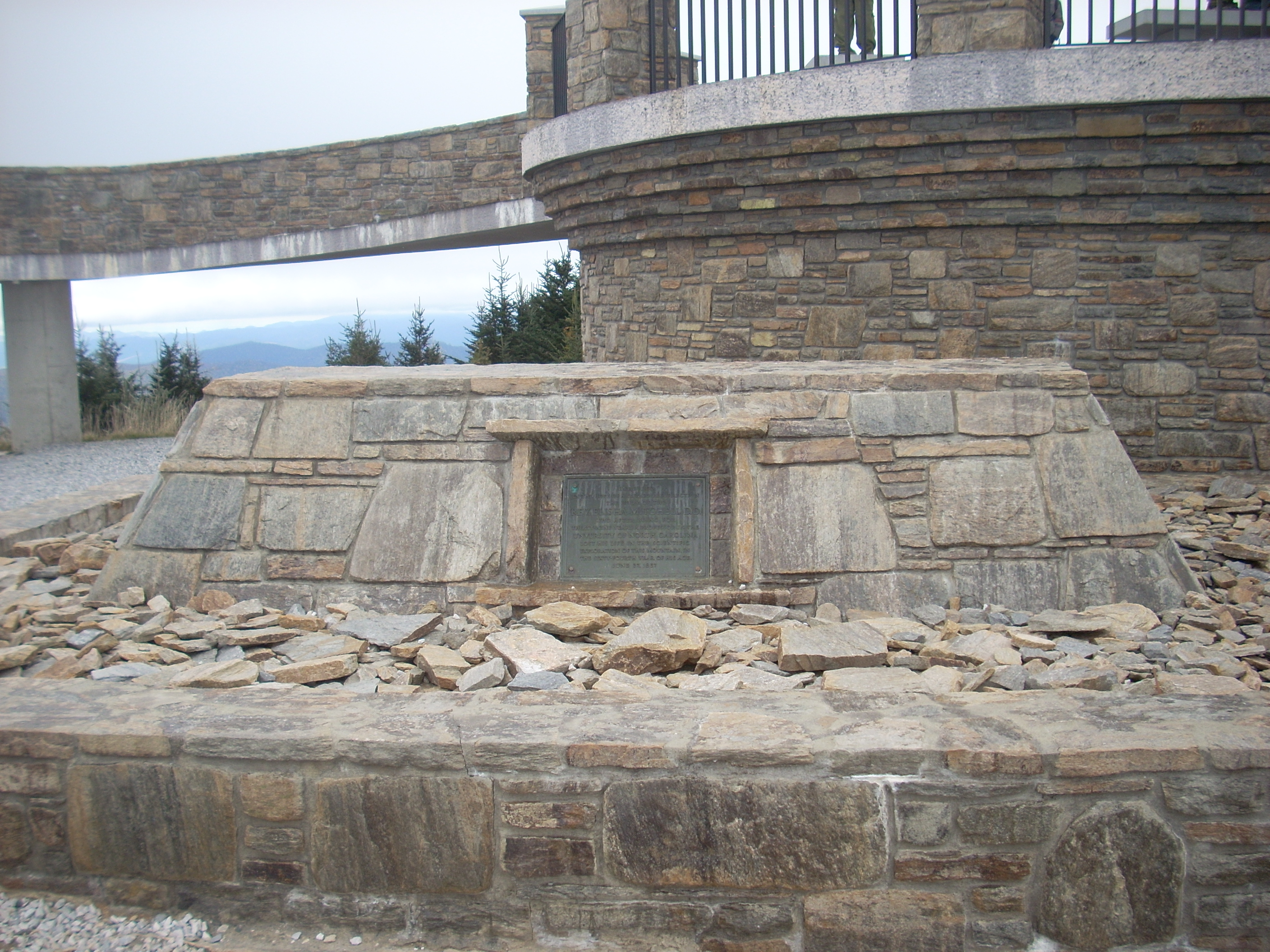
Tomb of Elisha Mitchell on the peak of Mount Mitchell

== Honors ==
The Journal of the Elisha Mitchell Scientific Society, published by the North Carolina Academy of Science, was founded in his honor in 1883.

On August 18, 1888, University of North Carolina Alumni erected an obelisk memorializing him at his grave site atop Mt. Mitchell. On January 1, 1915, high winds destroyed the monument. It was replaced 13 years later by the funeral cairn and plaque currently marking his tomb. "University" is misspelled on the plaque.

Mitchell County, North Carolina, is named after him. Mount Mitchell, however, is not within the boundaries of Mitchell County, but in neighboring Yancey County.

== Family ==
Mitchell married Maria Sybil North from Connecticut and they had seven children. His daughter Margaret served as President of Oxford Female Academy in North Carolina, while his daughter Eliza served as president of Concord Female College in the same state.
