= Lula Vollmer =

American writer, dramatist (1889–1955)

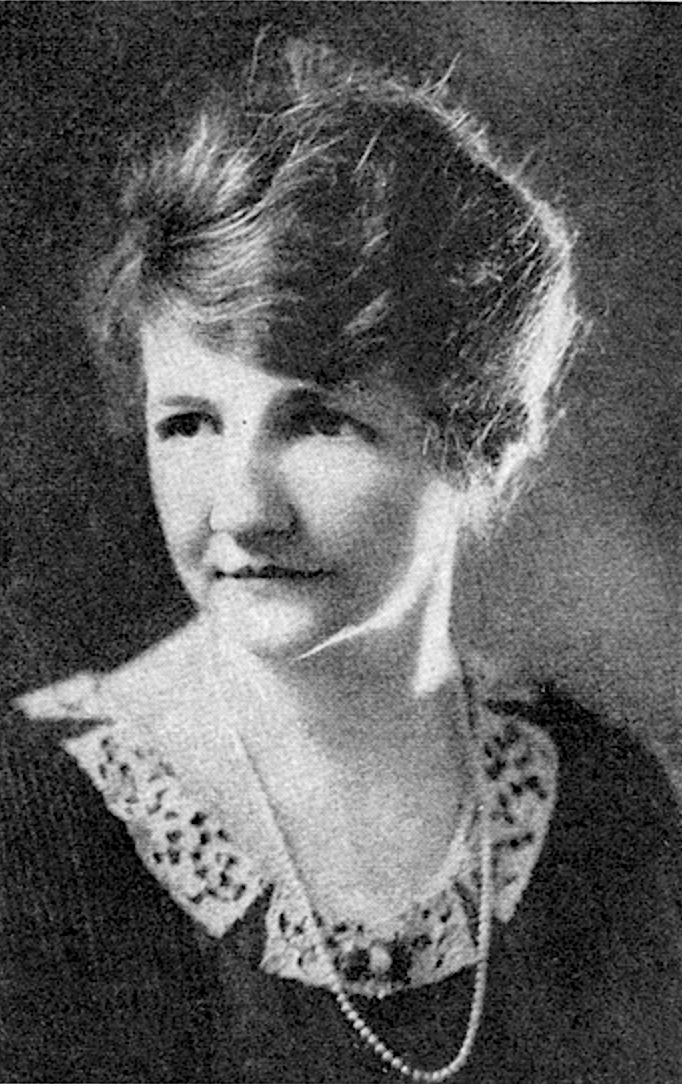
- Vollmer, 1923
- Born: Louisa Smith Vollmer; March 7, 1889; Keyser, Moore County, North Carolina, U.S.
- Died: May 2, 1955 (aged 66); New York City, New York, U.S.
- Other names: Louisa Smith, Louisa Smith Vollmer, Lulu Vollmer
- Education: Normal and Collegiate Institute of Asheville
- Occupations: Writer, dramatist, playwright

Lula Smith Vollmer (née Louisa Smith Vollmer; March 7, 1889 – May 2, 1955) was an American writer and dramatist, from North Carolina. Her work was mostly folk dramas and includes plays, short stories, and radio serials; and some of her plays were adapted to film. Vollmer is one of the first Americans who was devoted entirely to the creation of works about Appalachian mountain people. Her best known plays were Sun-Up (1923), and The Shame Woman (1923). She was also known as Lulu Vollmer.

== Early life and education ==
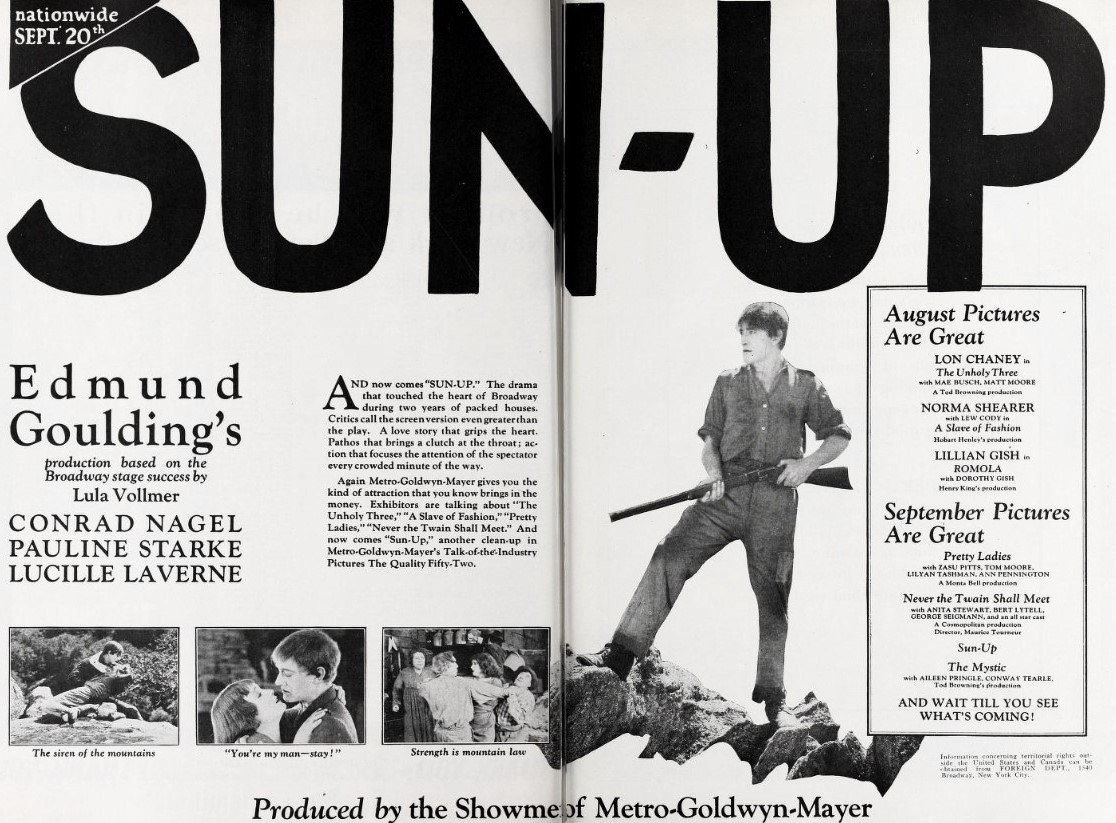
Advertisement for the 1925 film Sun-Up

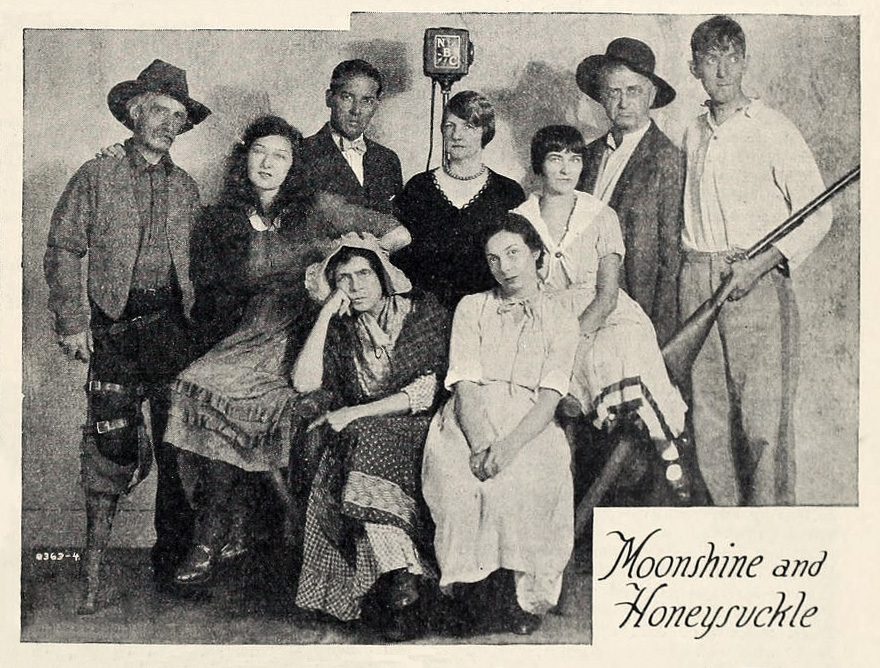
Cast of the radio production of Moonshine and Honeysuckle in 1931(left to right): Claude Cooper, Anne Elstner, Gerald Stopp (NBC Production Manager), Lula Vollmer, Jeannie Begg, John Milton, Louis Mason (seated) Ann Sutherland, and Sara Haden

Louisa Smith Vollmer was born in 1889, in Keyser in Moore County, North Carolina (what later became Addor, North Carolina), to parents Virginia (née Smith) and of William Sherman Vollmer. She travelled in the Southern United States with her machinist father who worked for lumber companies. She attended boarding school starting at age 8. Vollmer began writing narratives in her youth, with one of her first pieces published in The Nickel Magazine at age 17. After high school, she started a reporting career and later worked as an auditor at Hotel Piedmont, in Atlanta, Georgia.

She attended Normal and Collegiate Institute of Asheville, a predecessor of Asheville Female College.

== Career ==
In the early 1920s, she relocated to New York City and, while employed as a ticket seller at the Theatre Guild, completed her debut play, Sun-Up. It opened on March 24, 1923, at the Provincetown Playhouse in New York City, which was her Broadway debut. Sun-Up was about a North Carolina woman who attempts to kill a World War I deserter, after her son is killed in combat. The play was subsequently adapted into a film in 1925, and a television production in 1939. The Sun-Up play travelled to Chicago, London, and Amsterdam, and raised $40000 US ($571663 US with inflation) for an Appalachian educational fund.

Vollmer’s works include stage plays such as The Shame Woman (1923), The Dunce Boy (1925), and Trigger (1927); the latter was remade as the 1934 film Spitfire, starring Katharine Hepburn. Additional plays in her portfolio include Sentinels (1931), In a Nutshell (1936), The Hill Between (1938), and She Put Out To Go (1946).

The Shame Woman, play opened October 16, 1923 at Greenwich Village Theatre, and was shown for 278 shows. It focused on the character Lize Burns (Florence Rittenhouse), who was violated by her neighbor Craig Anson (Edward Pawley), and shunned by her community as a result of his bragging. She moved into an isolated cabin with her adopted daughter Lily (Thelma Paige), who is now taking an interest in dating. Lize tells her daughter her experienced with Craig Anson when she was younger, and as a result Lily commits suicide. After her death, Lize learns that Craig was pursuing Lily and Lize kills him to prevent him from bragging. Other cast included Claude Cooper, Florence Gerald, and Minnie Dupree. The Shame Woman was praised by critics.

Vollmer adapted her works for multiple media, including Vaudeville, theater, radio, television, motion pictures, and short stories. In the 1930s, she concentrated on radio serials, creating programs such as The Widow's Son, Grits and Gravy, Moonshine and Honeysuckle, and It's Your Business. Throughout her career, short fiction by the author appeared in leading periodicals such as Collier's Weekly and The Saturday Evening Post. One notable piece, "The Road That Led Afar" (1939), was subsequently reimagined for television as an episode of the General Electric Theater in 1956.

== Death and legacy ==
Following her May 2, 1955 passing from a heart attack in New York City, various works of hers were issued and produced posthumously. She was buried in Attalla, Alabama.

She never married, and lived with literary women in New York City. For 25 years she lived with Elizabeth "Brownie" Brown. Two of her personal letters survive.

== Filmography ==
- When Love Forgives (1913)
- Sun-Up (1925), Metro-Goldwyn-Mayer
- Spitfire (1934), RKO Pictures
- Sun-Up (1939), made for TV movie; British Broadcasting Corporation (BBC)

== Theater ==
- Sun-Up (1923)
- The Shame Woman (1923)
- The Dunce Boy (1927)
- Trigger (1928)
- Troyka (1930), adaptation
- Sentinels (1931)
- Moonshine and Honeysuckle (1934), Samuel French, Inc.
- The Hill Between (1938)
- She Put Out To Go (1946)

== Radio shows ==
- The Widow's Son
- Grits and Gravy
- Moonshine and Honeysuckle (1931), NBC Radio
- It's Your Business
