= Sun-Up =

1925 film

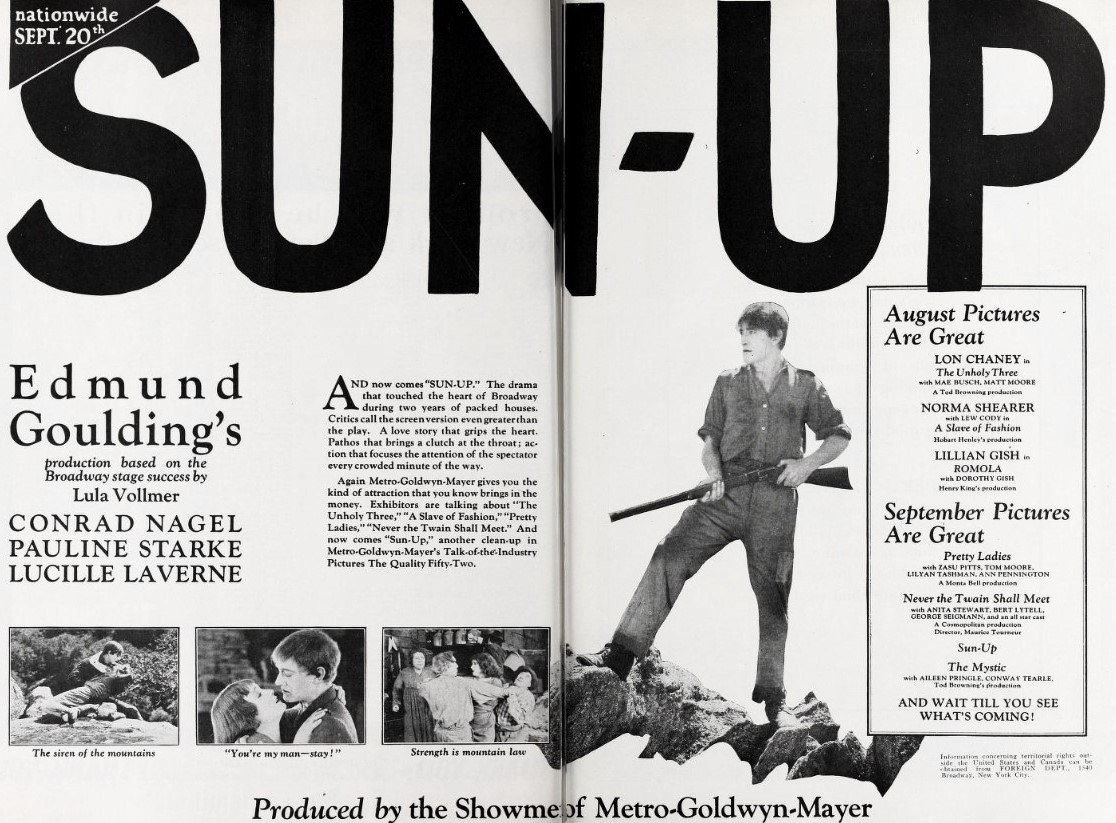
- Advertisement
- Directed by: Edmund Goulding
- Written by: Arthur F. Statter; Edmund Goulding
- Based on: Sun-Up; 1924 play by Lula Vollmer
- Starring: Pauline Starke; Conrad Nagel; Lucille La Verne
- Cinematography: John Arnold
- Distributed by: Metro-Goldwyn-Mayer
- Release date: September 20, 1925
- Running time: 60 minutes
- Country: United States
- Language: Silent (English intertitles)

Sun-Up is a 1925 American silent drama film directed by Edmund Goulding based upon a successful 1924 play of the same name by Lula Vollmer. The film stars Lucille La Verne, replaying her successful New York stage role, Pauline Starke, and Conrad Nagel.

== Plot ==
As described in a film magazine reviews, Rufe, the son of a murdered Appalachian moonshiner, outpoints his rival, Sheriff Weeks, when he marries Emmy before going to serve in the War. A deserter is concealed by Rufe’s mother and later she learns that he is the son of the murderer of her husband. When she is about to kill the stranger in cold blood, she is notified that her son has been killed in the war and that he would not commit such a deed. She permits the young man to make his escape.

== Cast ==
- Pauline Starke as Emmy
- Conrad Nagel as Rufe
- Lucille La Verne as Mother
- Sam De Grasse as Sheriff Weeks
- George K. Arthur as Stranger
- Arthur Rankin as Bud
- Edward Connelly as Pap Todd
- Bainard Beckwith as Bob

== Preservation ==
A print of Sun-Up is preserved by Metro-Goldwyn-Mayer in their studio library.
