= Samuel Henry Dickson =

American poet

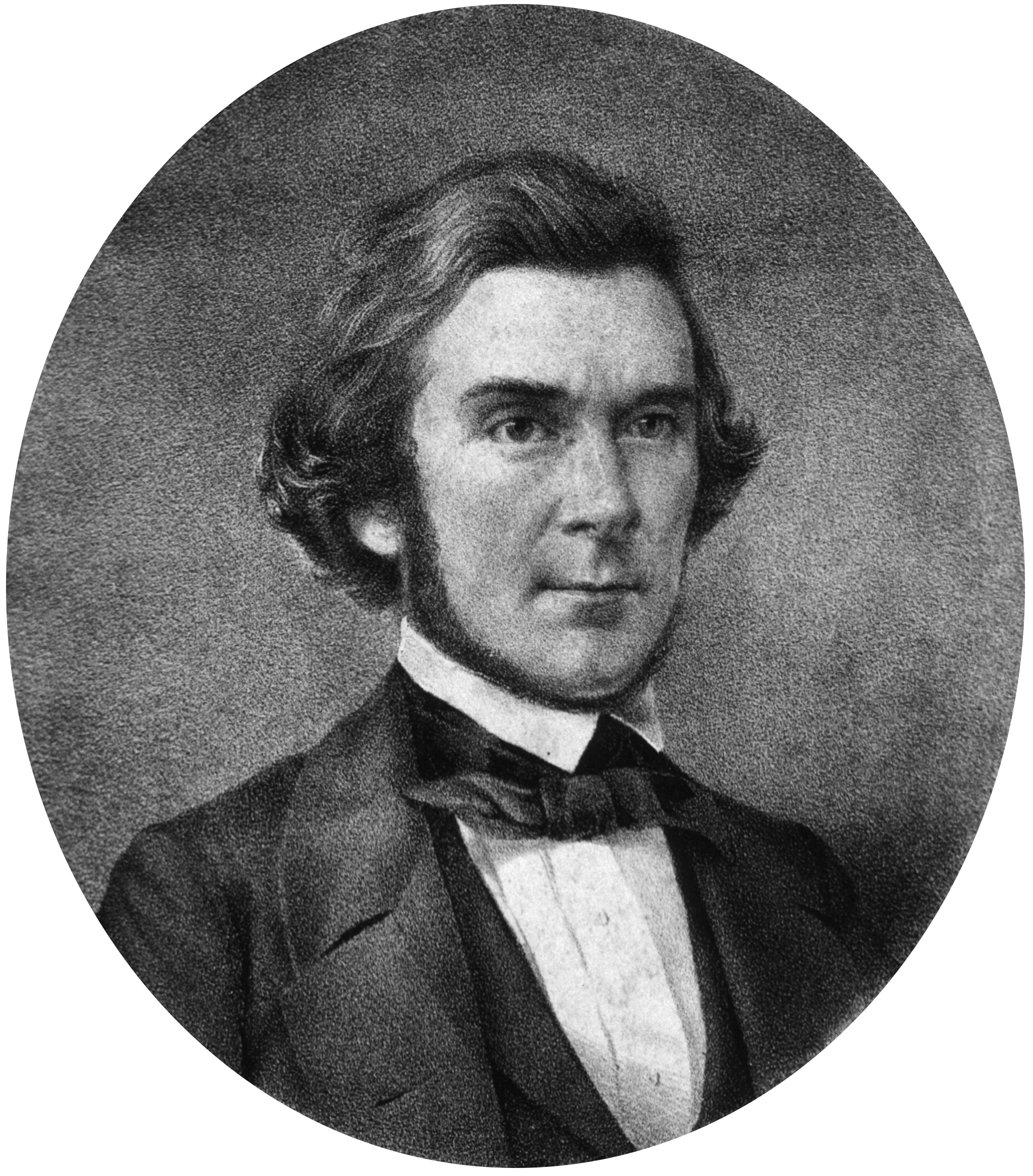
Samuel Henry Dickson, National Library of Medicine

Samuel Henry Dickson (September 20, 1798 - March 31, 1872) was an American poet, medical doctor, writer and educator born in Charleston, South Carolina.

Dickson graduated from Yale and the University of Pennsylvania. He was one of the founders of the Medical College of South Carolina. He also taught at NYU and the Jefferson Medical College in Philadelphia, Pennsylvania. Dickson was a popular published poet and a leader in Charleston intellectual circles. He was friends with Charleston poet William Gilmore Simms and William Cullen Bryant. He and his brother, Dr. John Dickson, played a significant role in the medical education of America's first female doctor, Elizabeth Blackwell. He was also active in organizing the first railway in the U.S. by helping bring the locomotive "the Best Friend of Charleston" into service. Dickson was a frequent lecturer; his addresses included a Phi Beta Kappa Address at Yale in 1842. In recent years, he has received attention for his proslavery writings.

Dickson died in Philadelphia in 1872.

== Selected works ==
- Hygiene : an introductory lecture (1848)
- On the progress of the Asiatic cholera during the year 1844-45-46-47-48 (1849)

== Sources ==
- Bain, R. et al. (1980) Southern Writers: A Biographical Dictionary LSU Press ISBN 0-8071-0390-X (Southern Writers on Google Books, p126)
