= Allen Turner Davidson =

American politician (1819–1905)

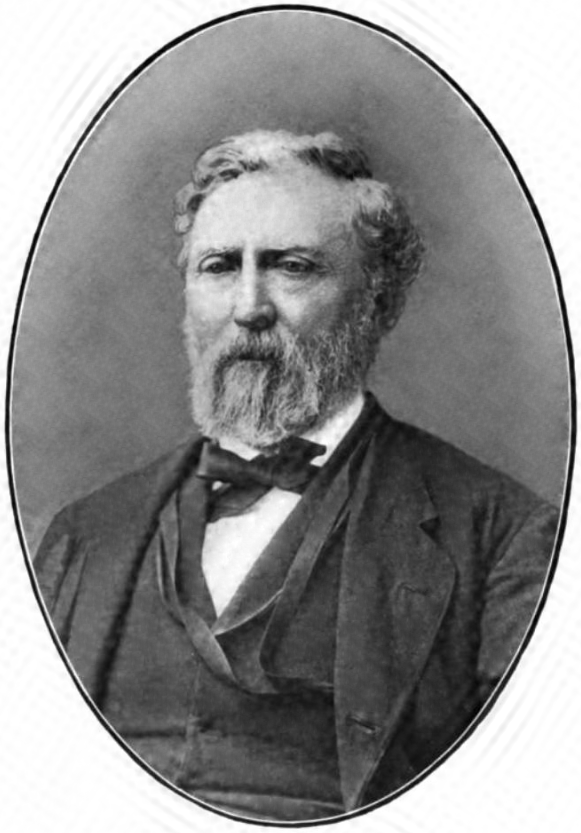
- Born: May 9, 1819; Haywood County, North Carolina, US
- Died: January 24, 1905 (aged 85); Asheville, North Carolina, US
- Occupations: Lawyer, politician
- Spouse: Elizabeth Adeline Howell (m. 1842)
- Children: Ella Henrietta Davidson Morrison

Allen Turner Davidson (May 9, 1819 – January 24, 1905) was a prominent Confederate politician. He represented North Carolina state in the Provisional Confederate Congress and the First Confederate Congress.

== Biography ==
Allen Turner Davidson was born in Haywood County, North Carolina on May 9, 1819. He married Elizabeth Adeline Howell in 1842. His daughter, Ella Henrietta Davidson Morrison, served as North Carolina state regent for the Daughters of the American Revolution.

He died in Asheville on January 24, 1905.
