= Andrew Flinn Dickson =

American minister and author

Andrew Flinn Dickson (November 8, 1825 – January 8, 1879) was an American minister and author born in Charleston, South Carolina.

== Birth ==
Dickson was born to Rev. John Dickson and Mary Augusta Flinn in Charleston, South Carolina, on November 8, 1825. His maternal grandfather was a daughter of Rev. Andrew Flinn, D.D., the first pastor of the 2d Presbyterian Church in Charleston.

== Education and career ==
Dickson graduated from Yale College in 1845. After graduation he began to teach in his native city, but soon moved to a more northern climate for the sake of his father's health. He taught in Cincinnati for about a year, and after his father's death in 1847, entered Lane Theological Seminary.

The next year he returned to New Haven, and was connected with the Yale Divinity School until January 1850. In the meantime, he had been licensed to preach by the Middlesex (Conn) Association of Congregational Ministers, and was married on January 7, 1850, to Miss A. H. Woocthull, of Long Island. He took charge of the Presbyterian Churches of John's Island and Wadmalaw near Charleston, in which of a membership of 360, 330 were African-American.

After serving in this position for some years and acting for a short time as an agent of the American Tract Society, he took charge in 1856 of the Presbyterian Church in Orangeburg. He left this position to become a chaplain in the Confederate service during the late war.

His next pastoral charge was over the Canal Street Presbyterian Church in New Orleans from 1868 to 1871. He served a church in Wilmington, North Carolina for about 18 months, and then a church in Chester, South Carolina for three years.

The General Assembly of the Southern Presbyterian Church established an Institute for the Training of Colored Ministers at Tuscaloosa, Alabama, and Dickson was appointed its first professor in October 1876.

He died in Tuscaloosa after two days' illness of pleurisy on January 8, 1879, aged 53 years. His wife and nine children survived him.

== Publications ==
Dickson published, in 1856 and 1860, two series of Plantation Sermons and, in 1872, a volume on the Temptation in the Desert. He was also, in 1878, the successful competitor for the prize established by the late Hon. Richard Fletcher, with an essay entitled, The Light - is it Waning?.
