= Albemarle Park =

Historic district in Asheville, North Carolina, United States

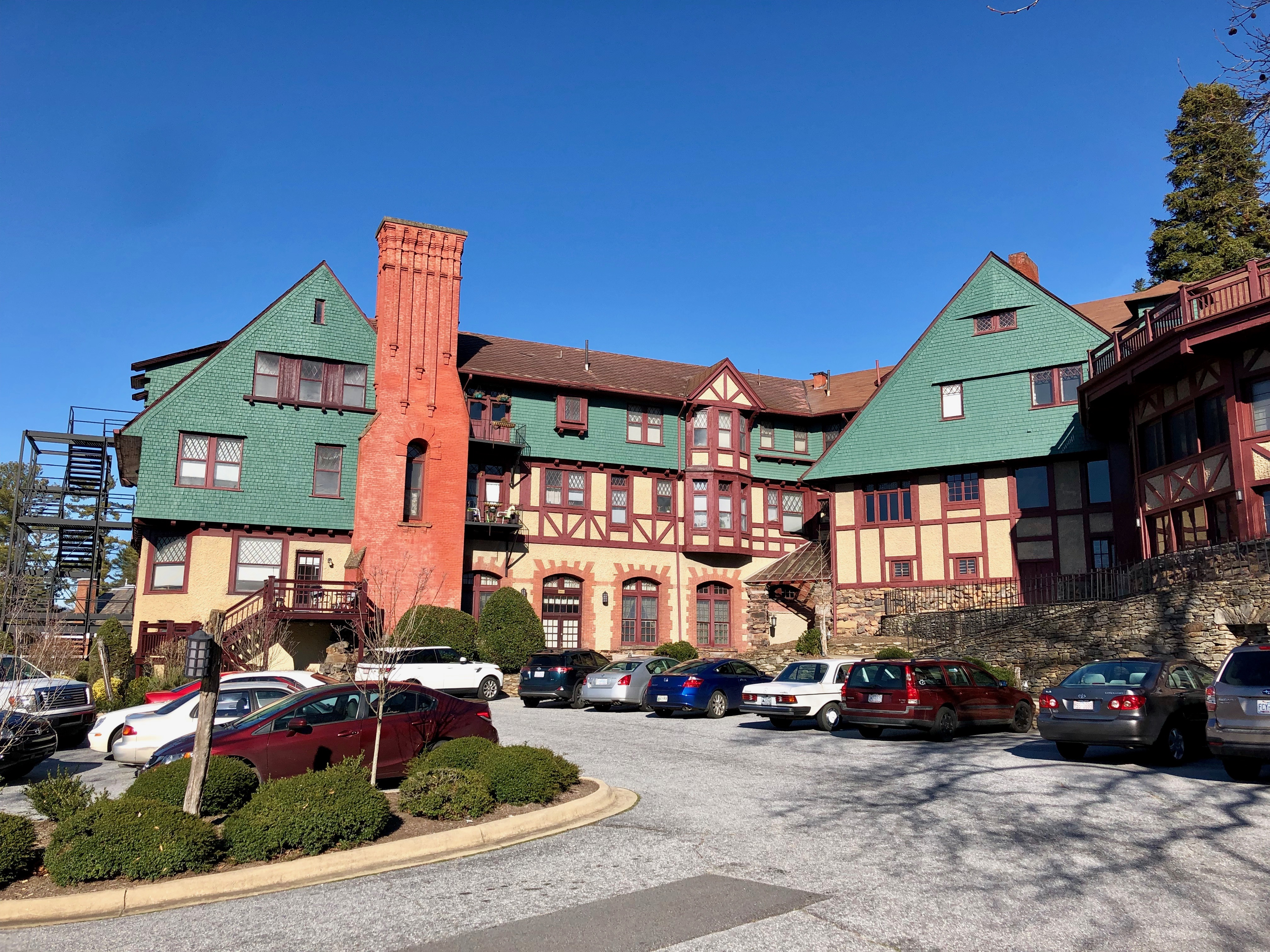
The Manor Inn, Albemarle Park, Asheville, NC

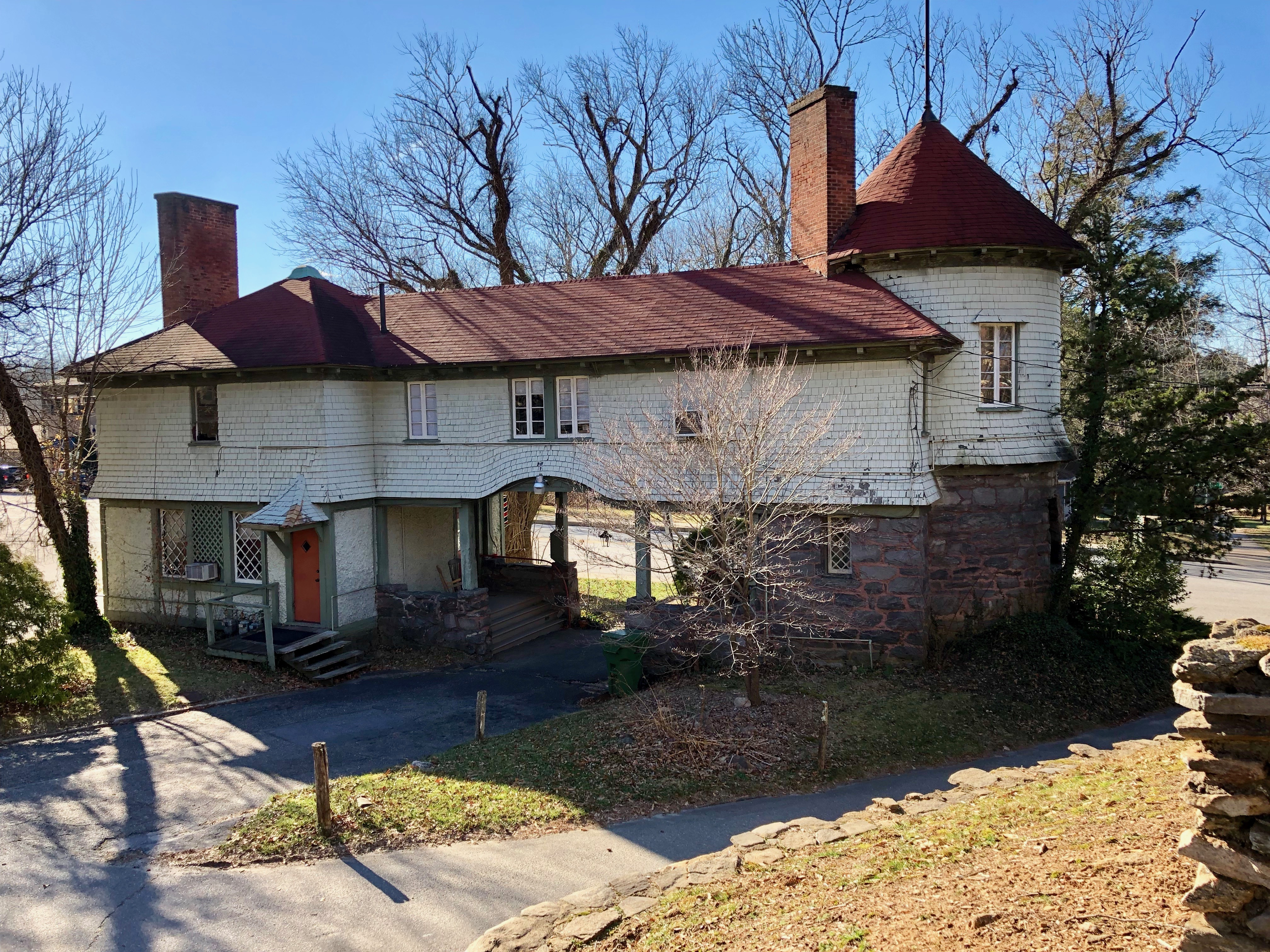
The Lodge (aka Gatehouse), Albemarle Park, Asheville, NC

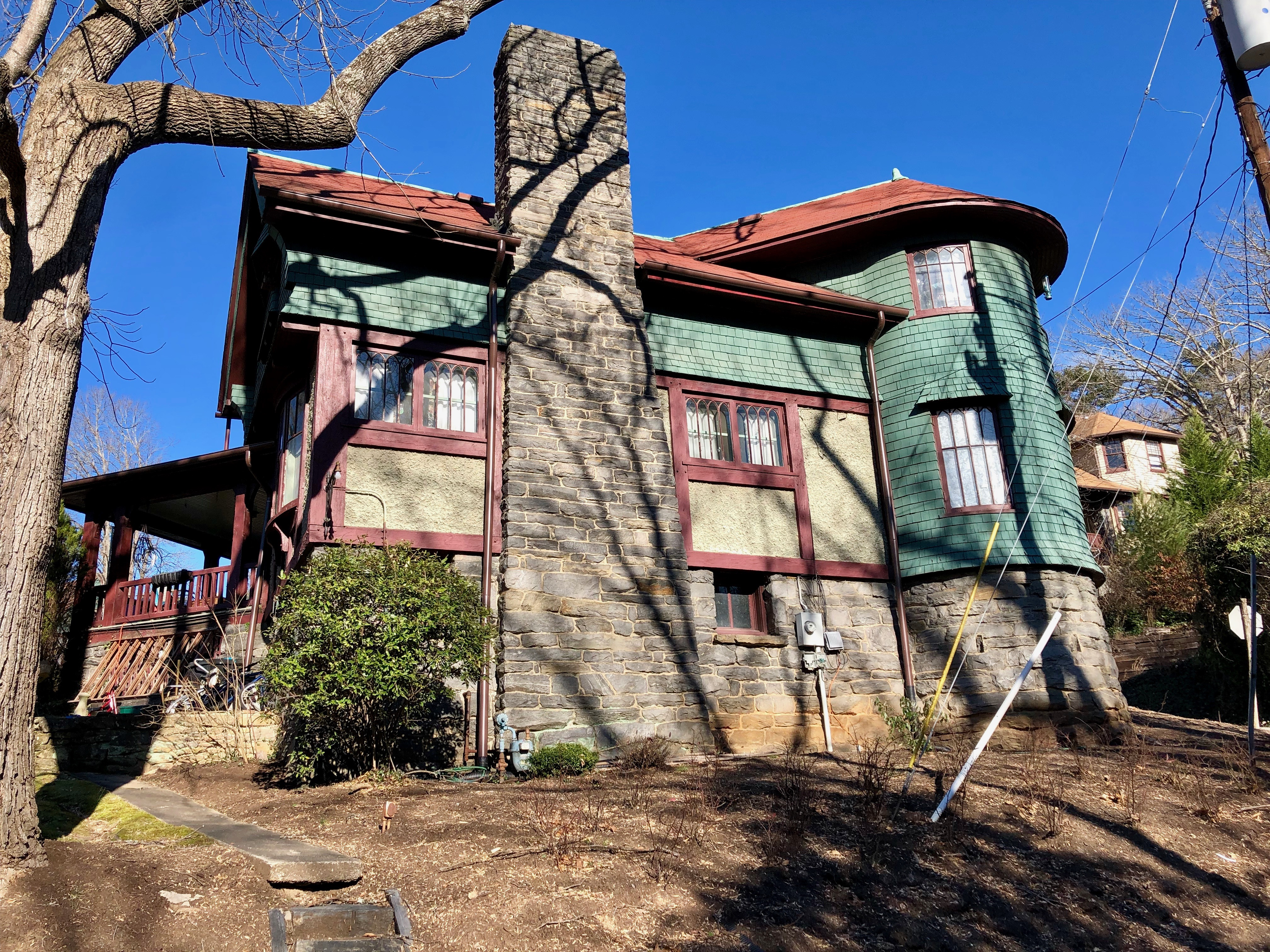
Clover Cottage, Albemarle Park, Asheville, NC

Albemarle Park is an historic district in Asheville, North Carolina. Originally a mountain resort, it is now primarily a residential area of homes and apartments with retail and office spaces. Much of its significance is due to the founder, railroad magnate William Greene Raoul, and his selection of three New York City-based men to design his resort. Architect Bradford Lee Gilbert designed the core buildings, including The Manor Inn, the Lodge Gate, and several cottages. Landscape architect and author Samuel Parsons, Jr. planned the roads and romantic, naturalistic landscape. Parsons had been the head landscape architect for the city of New York after working with Frederick Law Olmsted on Central Park. A drainage and sewage plan was done by leading engineer George E. Waring Jr.

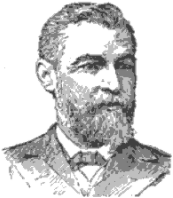
William Greene Raoul (1843–1913)

William Greene Raoul's large family was involved in various parts of building Albemarle Park, but son Thomas Wadley Raoul took the lead role of overseeing the development and served as the first manager of the Albemarle Park Company. Thomas built and lived in both Manzanita and Milfoil Cottages, and later was one of the founders of the Biltmore Estate Company that developed Biltmore Forest.

English-born Richard Sharp Smith, supervising architect of Biltmore Estate, and Atlantan J. Neel Reid also contributed to Albemarle Park's architecture. Cottage styles are varied and range from Tudoresque and Shingle-Style to Appalachian Rustic and Colonial Revival.

In the early years, The Manor was one of the main centers of social life in Asheville. Eleanor Roosevelt and Grace Kelly stayed in The Manor during the 1950s. Writer Thomas Wolfe performed in a Shakespeare play in The Circle Park and Nina Simone (then Eunice Waymon) studied classical music in Milfoil Cottage. Later, the Manor would become a retirement home, before housing the Stone Soup restaurant. Once vacant, The Manor served as a set for The Last of the Mohicans. It was saved from demolition by The Preservation Society of Asheville and Buncombe County.

Albemarle Park is a National Register Historic District, a Local Historic District, and has received recognition from the American Society of Landscape Architects. Cottage Living Magazine named Albemarle Park one of its Top 10 Cottage Communities.
