= Manor and Cottages =

Historic district in North Carolina, United States

- U.S. National Register of Historic Places
- U.S. Historic district
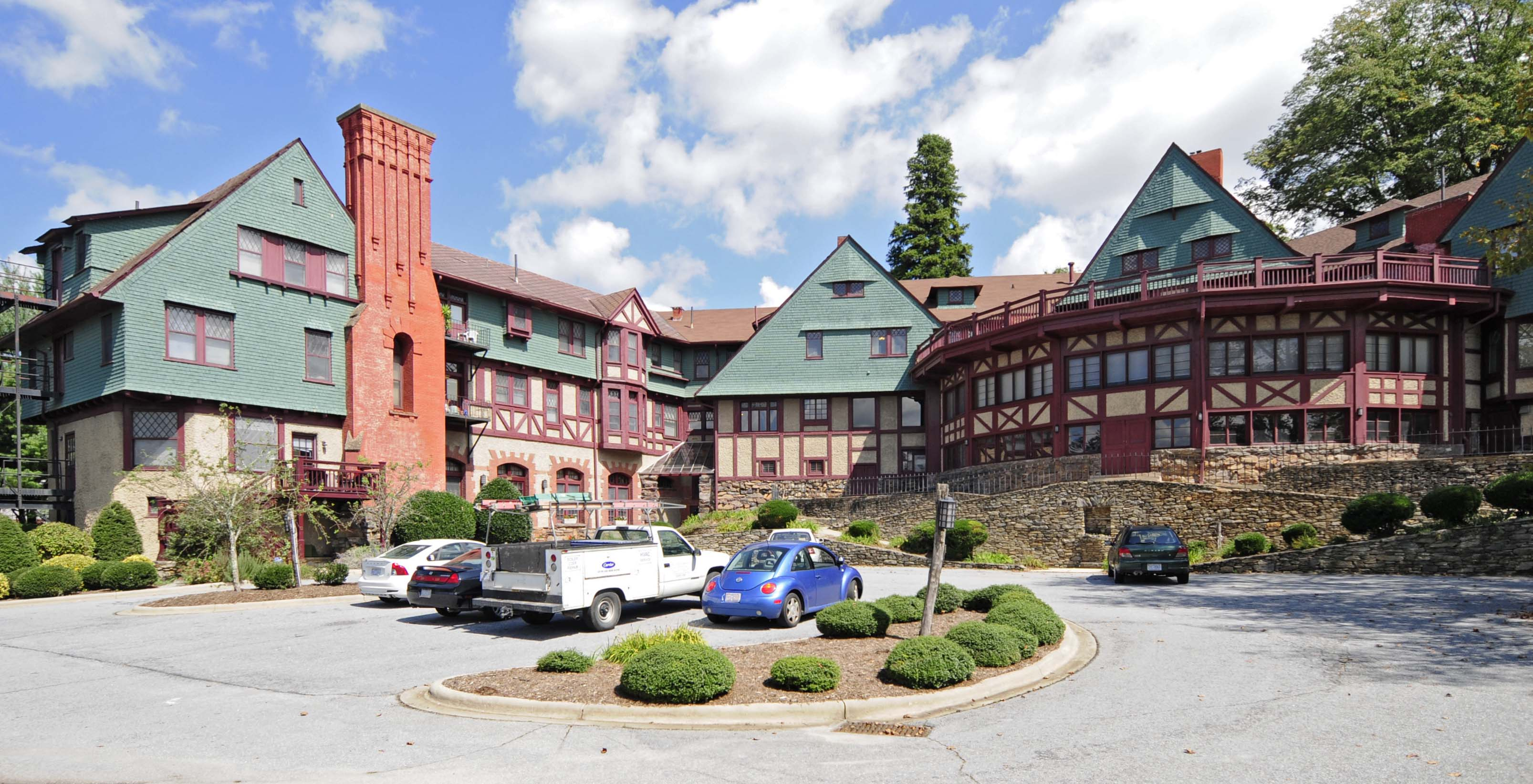
- The Manor and Cottages, September 2012

- Location within North Carolina Location within the United States
- Location: 265 Charlotte St., Asheville, North Carolina
- Coordinates: 35°36′29″N 82°32′33″W
- Area: 40 acres (16 ha)
- Built: 1898-1899, 1903, 1913-1914
- Architectural style: Colonial Revival, Shingle Style, Tudor Revival
- NRHP reference No.: 78001934
- Added to NRHP: January 26, 1978

Manor and Cottages is a historic resort complex and national historic district located in the Albemarle Park neighborhood in Asheville, Buncombe County, North Carolina. The complex encompassed 36 contributing buildings that were built starting in 1898. The main hotel, The Manor, was built starting in 1898–1899, and consists of a rambling group of interconnected wings with elements of the Colonial Revival, Shingle Style, and Tudor Revival styles. Wings were added to the original building in 1903 and 1913–1914. Located on the property are the contributing Club House (c. 1903) and a 19 guest cottages built between 1899 and 1920. The hotel was later converted for use as a retirement hotel for elderly persons with limited incomes.

It was listed on the National Register of Historic Places in 1978.

It is currently being used as an apartment complex run by Leslie and Associates.
