= Andy Dixon (footballer) =

English footballer

Personal information
- Full name: Andrew Dixon
- Date of birth: 19 April 1968 (age 58)
- Place of birth: Louth, England
- Height: 6 ft 1 in (1.85 m)
- Position: Right-back

Youth career
- Grimsby Town

Senior career*
| Years | Team | Apps | (Gls) |
| 1986–1989 | Grimsby Town | 38 | (0) |
| 1989–1990 | Southend United | 24 | (0) |
- Lincoln City
- Gateshead
- Southend Manor
| 1992–1993 | Chelmsford City | 12 | (0) |
- Wealdstone
| 2003–200? | Basildon United | | |
- * Club domestic league appearances and goals

Andrew Dixon (born 19 April 1968) is an English former footballer who made 62 appearances in the Football League playing as a right-back for Grimsby Town and Southend United.

== Career ==
Dixon began his career at Grimsby Town, initially played for the club as a youth before stepping up to the first team. Dixon made 38 Football League appearances during his time at the club, signing for Southend United in 1989. Dixon stayed at Southend for one season, making 24 league appearances, before leaving the club.

He joined Lincoln City at the start of their pre-season preparations on an initial month-by-month basis. Dixon debuted for club when appearing as a 70th minute substitute for Steve Stoutt in the 2-0 First Round First Leg Rumbelows Cup defeat at Halifax Town on 28 August. This would be his only senior appearance for the Imps and he departed Sincil Bank on 14 September following the completion of his month-by-month contract with manager Allan Clarke judging that, at that point in time, Paul Casey was a better player in his position.

Dixon later played for Gateshead, Southend Manor, Chelmsford City, Wealdstone and Basildon United.
