= American Baptist Home Mission Society =

Baptist society in the United States

The American Baptist Home Mission Society is a Christian missionary society. Its predecessor, the Home Mission Society, was established in 1832 in New York City to operate in the American frontier, with the stated mission "to preach the Gospel, establish churches and give support and ministry to the unchurched and destitute." In the 19th century, the Home Mission Society was part of the Triennial Convention, the mainline Baptist denomination in the United States established in 1814. Today, the Home Mission Society is part of the reorganization of the Triennial Convention, the American Baptist Churches USA, reorganization by merger of the several Triennial societies and organizations related to missions and work, including publications (1824), women (1877), and education (1888).

== Founding ==
Early 19th-century Baptist churches in the United States formed national "societies" with specific mission orientations related under the umbrella of the Triennial Convention. The deepest root of American Baptist Home Mission Societies (ABHMS) is the Baptist General Tract Society founded in Washington, D.C., on February 25, 1824, "to disseminate evangelical truth, and to inculcate sound morals, by the distribution of tracts." In 1826 the tract society relocated to Philadelphia, where it was renamed the American Baptist Publication Society. The 1824 tract society became the American Baptist Society in 1870, the Board of Publication and Education in 1944, and Educational Ministries in 1972. Home mission pioneer John Mason Peck was the general secretary, 1843–1845.

The Home Mission Society (ABHMS), itself, was organized in 1832 to raise support for missionaries in North America. Later, Dr. Henry Lyman Morehouse, corresponding secretary of ABHMS, took the lead in forming the American Baptist Education Society (ABES) in May 1888 to promote "Christian education under Baptist auspices in North America." A major achievement of the group was the founding of the University of Chicago in 1890, strongly supported by John D. Rockefeller. In addition, Dr. Morehouse (for whom Morehouse College is named) succeeded in engaging Rockefeller in major financial support for Bacone College, Spelman College, and black education in general. Responsibility for historically black colleges, founded by and for freedmen and women after the Civil War, remained with ABHMS until the Great Depression, when this work was transferred to the Education Society. After 1935, the only schools administered by ABHMS were Bacone College, Muskogee, Oklahoma; International Baptist Seminary, East Orange, New Jersey; and the Spanish-American Baptist Seminary (SABS), Los Angeles. The publishing (Judson Press), educational, and discipleship ministries of the educational society were transferred to National Ministries in 2003 with the dissolution and merger of the Board of Publication and Education (Educational Ministries).

Other significant roots that were grafted into the work of the national societies were the Women's Baptist Home Mission Society (WBHMS), founded in Chicago on February 1, 1877, and the Woman's American Baptist Home Mission Society (WABHMS), founded in Boston on November 14, 1877. These two societies merged in 1909 and moved their offices to New York City. In 1955, the WABHMS integrated its work with ABHMS.

Soon after the founding of ABHMS, the Free Will Baptist Home Mission Society was formed in Dover, N.H., on July 31, 1834, with David Marks as the first corresponding secretary. In 1842, Marks moved to Oberlin, Ohio, where he befriended the evangelist Charles G. Finney and was active in the Underground Railroad. The Free Will Society and related Free Baptist Women's Missionary Society of Boston merged with the American Baptist Societies in 1911.

== Seeds of the Home Mission Society ==
When the American Baptist Home Mission Society (ABHMS) was founded in 1832, it was patterned after the older American Baptist Foreign Mission Society (ABFMS) (1814) and the even older Massachusetts Domestic Missionary Society (1802), which was organized to "furnish occasional preaching, and to promote the knowledge of evangelic truth in the new settlements of these United States, or further, if circumstances should render it proper" and to "evangelize the Indians and western frontiersmen." The imprint of these early missionary societies, leaders, and missionaries has been determinative for the world view and work of ABHMS (National Ministries, 1972–2010).

For most of its history, ABHMS enabled American Baptist congregations to support missionaries serving on its behalf in North America, including Canada, Mexico, the Caribbean, and Central America. In the beginning, before telegraphs and railroads, reaching these new frontiers on the vast North American continent required the cooperative efforts of many Baptists and great hardship on the part of missionaries. As mission fields grew stronger and became self-supporting, these newly formed associations, societies, and conventions began planting churches, founding schools, and sending and supporting their own missionaries. It is the ancient biblical model that the one evangelized and discipled becomes the evangelist and disciple-maker so that faith passes from neighbor to neighbor and generation to generation. A good example is the Kiowa Baptists at Saddleback Mountain in Oklahoma, who wanted "other Indians to hear about the Jesus Road" and filled red Jesus barrels with money to send a missionary to the Hopi Indians in Arizona and established the Sunlight Mission on Second Mesa. In the late 20th century, a corrective missiological shift occurred that continues to gain momentum. Local congregations saw home mission as not only what they paid others to do on their behalf on distant frontier mission fields on the Crow Reservation in Montana or Kodiak, Alaska, but also what they were called to do on the mission field at their own doorstep. Historically, African-American churches have practiced "mission on your doorstep," yet a radical missional-church approach also challenges African-Americans. This shift can be seen in the examples of African-American churches in Phonix sponsoring Navajo ministry and those in Los Angeles adding Latino staff and offering Spanish language classes.

Dr. William Staughton was present with William Carey at the formation of the English Baptist Missionary Society (Particular Baptist Society for the Propagation of the Gospel Amongst the Heathen) at Kettering, England, in 1792. His zeal for foreign missions was transplanted to America when he emigrated in 1793. He wrote The Baptist Mission in India in 1811. At First Baptist Church, Philadelphia, on May 18, 1814, the first General Missionary Convention of the Baptist Denomination in the United States of America for Foreign Missions (i.e. Triennial Convention) elected Staughton—an ardent supporter of Christian missionary work—as its first corresponding secretary for the newly formed Baptist Board of Foreign Missions. The purpose of the Triennial Convention was to support Adoniram Judson and Ann Judson's mission in Burma. The Judsons and the Rev. Luther Rice embraced Baptist sentiments aboard ship as they sailed to Calcutta. In India, they met British Baptist missionary Carey and were baptized by immersion. Evicted by the East India Co., Rice returned to America while the Judsons traveled to Burma. The fruit of Judson's long labor in Burma has in the 21st century come to the shores of North America, and ABHMS is currently working with 93 Burmese congregations.

John Mason Peck, a pastor in central New York, met Rice in June 1815 and spent several months traveling throughout central New York promoting a missionary spirit, encouraging missionary societies, and taking up collections for foreign missions. Influenced by the stories of Judson and Carey and stirred by the missionary vision of Rice, Peck sought support from the Triennial Convention to be appointed a missionary to the Missouri Territory. From May 1816 until May 1817, Peck studied under Stoughton in Philadelphia, when he and James Welch were commissioned for the "domestic mission" in the Missouri Territory. Rice was present. Peck and Welch arrived in St. Louis with their families in December 1817.

No one person influenced Baptist work more in the Midwest over the coming years than Peck. A pioneer of new methods, he founded the first Sunday schools, women's societies, and missionary societies in the territory. Peck organized the first Baptist churches west of the Mississippi, ordained the first African-American clergy in St. Louis, and helped found Alton Seminary, which later became Shurtleff College. Peck also served two terms in the Illinois State Legislature and was a vocal opponent of slavery. He faced harsh criticism from anti-mission, or "old school," Baptists, who believed neither in Sunday schools, colleges, or theological seminaries nor missionary, tract, or Bible societies.

Peck's appointment from the Triennial Convention was short-lived and not renewed in 1820. Opposition to the missionaries sprang from the fact that they had settled in St. Louis, where they established a church and a school, instead of "plunging into the wilderness and converting the Indians." The convention directed Peck to travel to Fort Wayne, Ind., to join Isaac McCoy in his work with the Indians. With calls to send missionaries to Russia, India, and the Sandwich Islands, and the financial demands of the new Columbia College in Washington, D.C., there were no resources to support home mission except with Native Americans. Peck did not join McCoy and continued his support with help from Massachusetts and later from ABHMS.

Rev. John Berry Meachum (1789–1854), a former slave and skilled carpenter who bought freedom for himself and his family, assisted American Baptist Home Mission pioneer Peck with the church and Sunday school Peck founded in St. Louis in 1817. Black and white, bond and free worshipped together at First Baptist until 1822, when African-American worshippers formed a separate branch. Peck ordained Pastor Meachum in 1825, when he founded the First African Baptist Church, the first Protestant congregation established for African-Americans west of the Mississippi River. Shortly after a brick church building was erected, Meachum and Peck opened a day school called the "Candle Tallow School" because classes were conducted in a secret room with no windows to avoid being discovered by the sheriff. Missouri law forbade teaching free or slave blacks to read and write. Even more restrictive laws were enacted by the General Assembly of Missouri in 1847.

But Meachum would not be denied. With the help of some of his friends—black and white—he bought a steamboat, fitted it with a library and classrooms, and, in 1847, christened his ship "Freedom School." The Mississippi River was federal territory, and the federal government did not enforce the Missouri law against education of blacks.

Peck founded the Missouri Bible Society in 1818, the Green County Sunday School Association in 1824, female mite societies in town and villages, the American Baptist Historical Society, and Baptist associations in Missouri and Illinois. Peck became an agent of the American Colonization Society—which founded Liberia and returned freed blacks to Africa—a might advocate of temperance, a student of the intricate problems of immigration, and a stout opponent of the effort to make Illinois a slave state. This social conscience has been conspicuous in the history of ABHMS. The American Baptist Antislavery Convention held in New York City in 1840 called for the immediate emancipation of slaves. When Congress passed restrictive legislation against Chinese immigration, ABHMS passed resolutions that this law was "contrary to the fundamental principles of our free government, and opposed to the spirit of the Christian religion." In the 20th century, ABHMS assisted the Japanese in internment camps during World War II, was a frontline advocate during the civil rights movement with Jitsuo Morikawa organizing marches in 1963, worked for the empowerment of church and society, strove for ecological responsibility in its eco-justice emphasis, supported the Sullivan Principles during apartheid in South Africa, and continues to play an activist role in ethical investing. Recently, ABHMS partnered with the Proctor Institute in hearings following Hurricane Katrina, facilitated racial reconciliation, and advocated for children in poverty.

== The legacy of Home Mission ==
Leaders and missionaries of ABHMS were involved in the founding of New York University, University of Chicago, Vassar College, Denison University, Kalamazoo College, Bacone College, Franklin College, and other schools. After the Civil War, ABHMS directed considerable financial and human resources to the establishment of schools for freed men. One of the first of more than two dozen was Wayland Seminary in Washington, D.C., in 1865, where Booker T. Washington studied, 1878–1879. Wayland merged with Richmond Institute in 1899 to form Virginia Union University. Shaw University, Morehouse College, Spelman College, Benedict College, and Florida Memorial University all trace their beginnings to the work of ABHMS. During the Great Depression, ABHMS turned over administration of the historically black colleges to the American Baptist Board of Education. Responsibility for Bacone College, International Baptist Seminary, and SABS remained with the Home Mission Society.

=== Work on the American frontier ===
The first home missionary appointed after the founding of the American Baptist Home Mission Society in 1832 was Thomas Ward Merrill, who, in 1829, went to the Michigan Territory. While a student at Waterville College in Maine, Merrill was influenced by the conversion of Professor George Dana Boardman and his offer of himself to serve as a missionary in India. To earn money for his trip from Maine to Michigan, he sold Ann Judson's "Memoirs" and the American Baptist Magazine. In Grand Rapids, he baptized Native Americans, was a founder of the LaGrange Association, was a pastor and church planter, and, later in life, was a fundraiser for the American Bible Union. When the churches of Michigan were numerous enough to be self-sufficient, ABHMS shifted resources to missionary work with the foreign population, the Detroit Baptist City Mission Society, and loans and gifts for the building of church edifices.

In 1833, 91 missionaries were appointed by the Home Mission Society. Many of the appointments in the early years were for a few months only for missionaries to "ascertain and report on the conditions in the fields." Among the 91 was Allen B. Freeman, sent to Chicago to found the First Baptist Church, the first church and school in this small frontier village. Lake Michigan was the baptistery. He planted five other churches in the prairie. Returning from one of these outposts 50 miles south of Chicago in December 1834, he died of exhaustion and exposure. This is the second missionary death; Spencer Clark died of cholera in 1833 in Palmyra, Missouri. Early missionaries forded rivers, rode horseback, and slept on beds of pine needles to spread the gospel.

Missionaries followed the expanding boundaries of the United States and ventured into Canada, Mexico, the Caribbean, and Central America. "North America for Christ" was a missional manifest destiny. When the Louisiana Purchase, Lewis and Clark Expedition and cessation of Indian hostilities during and following the War of 1812 opened the way for settlement in the Mississippi Valley, American Baptists were among the pioneers. Similarly, when opportunities opened in the Northwest Territory (modern states of Ohio, Indiana, Illinois, Michigan, and Wisconsin, as well as the northeastern part of Minnesota), in the Southwest following the Mexican–American War, in California during the 1849 Gold Rush, in the Republic of Texas, post-Russian Alaska, and in Cuba and Puerto Rico after the Spanish–American War, home missionaries moved to these new frontiers. As missions and churches were planted, missionaries created associations and Bible and tract societies and encouraged the formation of state conventions and, later, city mission societies. Printed materials were always essential to home mission activity. It is notable that, for the first 63 years, the offices of the American Baptist Home Mission Society were always near printing houses in Lower Manhattan. Tracts and Bibles, publications such as the Baptist Home Mission Monthly, Tidings, Home Mission Echoes, and Hope were essential mission tools. The American Baptist Home Mission Society worked jointly with the American Baptist Publication Society to dispatch colporteur wagons, railroad chapel cars, and gospel cruisers in the waters of Oregon and Washington to carry the printed and spoken word to the West, Puerto Rico, and Mexico. In 1931, 46 colporteur and chapel car missionaries were under appointment by the American Baptist Home Mission Society.

=== Work among Native Americans ===
The Home Mission Society sent missionaries to America's frontier, including some work with "Indians and Negroes," but it was not until after 1865 that the trust for Indian work in the United States, which had almost been extinguished during the Civil War, was transferred by the Missionary Union (later the ABFMS and International Ministries) to the Home Mission Society. By 1877, 13 home missionaries were at work among the Creek, Seminole, Delaware, Shwano, Kickapoo, Sac, and Fox in Indian Territory (modern Oklahoma). The WABHMS commissioned in its early years Mrs. E.A. Shaw, M.D., and Mrs. C. Bond (a Choctaw Christian) to serve with the Choctaws and Chickasaws in Indian Territory. Almon C. Bacone opened the Indian Normal and Theological School at Tahlequah in 1880. In 1881, the Creek Nation House of Warriors and House of Kings passed a bill to grant 160 acres to the American Baptist Home Mission Society to build a campus at Muskogee. The school was officially transferred to the Muskogee campus in 1885. At Bacone's death, the school was renamed Bacone College.

Meanwhile, in Montana, Crow people were facing assimilationist policies including the placement of their children in boarding schools. To avoid the removal of their children from the reservation, Crow leaders invited the American Baptist Home Mission Society to establish a school at Lodge Grass, Montana. In December 1903, William and Anna Petzoldt moved to the Crow Indian Reservation and founded the mission there. The school opened in 1904.

In 1914, the Oklahoma Baptist Convention voted to singly align with the Southern Baptist Convention. Home Mission Society work with the "civilized tribes" ended, work with the "blanket tribes" expanded in western Oklahoma, and new opportunities opened in Arizona, Montana, and California.

=== Work among freedmen ===
Ministry with freed men, women, and children began while the Civil War still raged. Joanna P. Moore learned of the needs of the freed women and children on Island No. 10, north of Memphis on the Mississippi River. In November 1863, she found herself on Island No. 10 among "1,100 colored women and children in distress" and a Union Army encampment. She had $4 from her Baptist Sabbath School in Belvidere, Ill., a promise of another $4 each month, a commission from the American Baptist Home Mission Society (without salary); she was the first missionary appointment made to the South. Thus she began a ministry that would span 40 years and earn her the moniker "Swamp Angel of the South."

In 1864, she ministered to a group of people at Helena, Ark. In 1868 she went to Lauderdale, Mississippi, to help the Friends in an orphan asylum. While she was at one time left temporarily in charge of the institution, cholera broke out, and 11 children died within one week, but she remained at her post until the fury of the plague was abated. She spent nine years in the vicinity of New Orleans, reading the Bible to those who could not read, writing letters in search of lost ones, and especially caring for the helpless old women that she met. She began the Fireside Schools in 1884 with "a prepared Bible lesson for all the family to read together daily; supplying the home with other appropriate books for parent and child to read together." She prepared a leaflet with Bible lessons each month called HOPE. Moore was the first missionary appointed by the newly formed WBHMS in 1877 and in the first graduating class of its Baptist Missionary Training School in Chicago in 1888. The themes of innovation, evangelism, education, ecumenism, networking, and social engagement are transparent in the life of Moore who labored "in Christ's stead."

In 1866 it founded Nashville Normal and Theological Institute, predecessor of Roger Williams University, for freedmen.

=== Women's societies ===
The WBHMS was founded in Chicago in 1877 to "promote the Christianization of homes by means of missions and mission schools.

In 1877, working with a group of Baptist women in the Boston area, Sophia Packard and Harriet Giles organized the WABHMS for the purpose of supporting women missionaries and the four-fold object of "evangelization of women among the freed people, the Indians, the heathen immigrants and the new settlements of the West." This was the second women's mission society, and the two would merge in 1909.

In 1891, Alice Blanchard Coleman became president of the Woman's American Baptist Home Mission Society and held that position until April, 1911, when, by the consolidation of the Woman's American Baptist Home Mission Society, headquarters in Boston, and the Woman's Baptist Home Mission Society, headquarters in Chicago, a new national organization was formed having the name of the Boston organization but with headquarters in Chicago. Coleman was the first vice-president of the new organization and president of the New England Branch of the Woman's American Baptist Home Mission Society, the branch being a local organization whose purpose was the holding of inspirational meetings and otherwise fostering the work of the Woman's American Baptist Home Mission Society.

=== Work with immigrants to the United States ===
Even before the geographical frontiers had closed, the American Baptist Home Mission Society found new frontiers in the work with freed men and women in the post-Civil War South and with new immigrants in large urban areas and in rural America. The first immigrant American Baptist Church was the German Church of the Lord that Meets on Poplar Street in Philadelphia, organized in 1843 by Konrad Fleischmann. He became the first American Baptist home missionary to German immigrants and was soon joined by John Eschmann, who was appointed in 1845 as a missionary to the Germans in New York City and Newark, New Jersey. The American Baptist Home Missionary Society board declared, "Thus is the Home Mission Society performing Foreign Mission work in our own land, and already has that work been owned and blessed of God." In 1858, August Rauschenbusch, father of Walter, was appointed professor of the new German Department at Rochester Theological Seminary and three times employed by the American Baptist Home Mission Society "to make a tour of inspection and exploration for the benefit of our missions among the German." In 1947, the German seminary moved to Sioux Falls and is now the Sioux Falls Seminary. The churches organized a conference in 1851 in Philadelphia, named the "Conference of Ministers and Helpers of German Churches of Baptized Christians, usually called Baptists." The German Baptist Publication Society was organized in Cleveland, Ohio, in 1881. Also in 1881, the WBHMS appointed Mrs. A. Johanning to work among the Germans in St. Louis. By 1882, 137 German Baptist congregations existed. The missionary spirit of the German churches resulted in new ministries with Bohemians, Poles, Slavonians, and Hungarians.

Missionary work with Scandinavians soon followed. Captain Gustaf Wilhelm Schröder (also known as G.W. Schroeder), a Swedish sea captain, was converted at Mariners' Temple in New York and returned to Sweden to birth the Baptist church there. He also married the daughter of the pastor of Mariners' Temple, Mary Steward. From the Baptist church in Sweden, Gustaf Palmquist came to the United States and founded the first Swedish Baptist Church at Rock Island, Illinois, in 1852, and was appointed by the American Baptist Home Mission Society to serve in Illinois, Ohio, and New York. F. O. Nilsson formed the second Swedish Baptist church in America in Houston, Minnesota. The WABHMS commissioned Miss Elizabeth Johnson to serve with Swedes in Chicago. In a similar pattern, the Swedish Baptists founded a Swedish-language publication, formed the Swedish Baptist General Conference, and began a theological and missionary training school at the Baptist Theological Seminary in Chicago. The school moved to St. Paul, Minn., in 1914 and became Bethel College and Seminary. Swedish Baptists participated in the work of the ABFMS until 1944, but separated its home mission work in 1921.

The American Baptist Home Mission Society began home mission work with Norwegians in 1848. The Norwegian Baptist Training School at Morgan Park, Ill., was connected to the University of Chicago until 1921, when it affiliated with Northern Baptist Theological Seminary. Other home mission efforts with people from the Nordic countries included Danish Baptists in 1856 and Finnish Baptists in 1890. The WBHMS appointed Miss S.B. Rasmussen to work with Danes and Norwegians in Chicago in 1882.

The American Baptist Home Mission Society worked with French Canadian immigrants and Mexicans beginning in 1849. Newton Theological Institute had a French Department. The American Baptist Home Mission Society began work in Santa Fe, New Mexico, in 1849, sending the first Protestant missionary to territory ceded by Mexico to the United States following the Mexican–American War. Assistants who spoke Spanish were employed for many years to labor among the old Mexican population. Chinese immigrant work started in California in 1869 with Mr. Fung Seung Nam as the first Chinese worker.

== The Society and the rejection of slavery ==
Immediately following the American Civil War, the Society worked with freedmen to establish 27 historically black colleges. Former slaves were eager for education after having been blocked from it for so long.

== Merger and renaming ==
In 1907, the Societies related to the Triennial Convention organized under the umbrella of the Northern Baptist Convention. The Home Mission Society merged with the Women's American Baptist Home Mission Society in 1955. From 1972 to 2010, the Mission Society operated under the name National Ministries of the American Baptist Churches USA. In 2003, the society merged with the American Baptist Education Society (founded 1888). Since 2010, it operates under the name American Baptist Home Mission Societies of the American Baptist Churches USA.

== See also ==
- Baptist
- Christianity and slavery
- Slavery in the United States
- American Baptist Foreign Mission Society
