= Woman's American Baptist Home Mission Society =

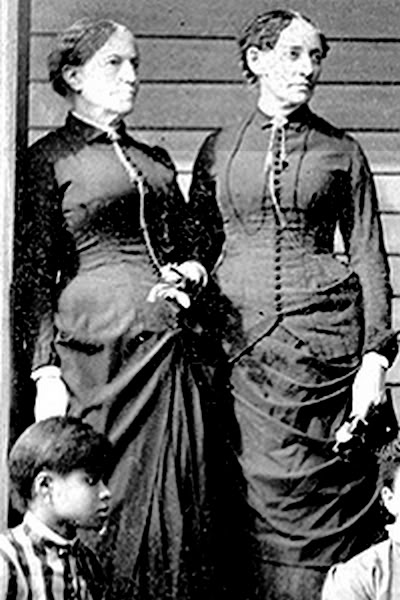
Harriet E. Giles and Sophia B. Packard

The Woman's American Baptist Home Mission Society was an American Christian women's missionary organization. Harriet E. Giles and Sophia B. Packard co-founded, in 1877, the Woman's American Baptist Home Mission Society, supporting missionary women bringing education to the African-American and Native American communities.

== Early history ==
=== Woman's Baptist Home Mission Society ===
The Woman's Baptist Home Mission Society (WBHMS) was founded in Chicago in 1877 to "promote the Christianization of homes by means of missions and mission schools, with special reference to the freed people, the Indians and immigrant heathen populations." In five years there were 22 workers in seven southern states. Moore was the first commissioned missionary. The WBHMS would later found the Baptist Missionary Training School in Chicago, send teachers to the Missionary Training Department of Shaw in Raleigh, North Carolina, and begin new work with the Piute Indians in Nevada and Mono Indians in California. The WBHMS founded the orphanage at Kodiak, Alaska, in 1893.

=== Woman's American Baptist Home Mission Society ===
On November 14, 1877, over two hundred ladies from Boston and vicinity met in the Meionaon, Tremont Temple, Boston for the purpose of organizing a woman's home mission society.Sophia B. Packard presided. Much encouragement was given by a woman from Maine, who said that the women of her state were ready and waiting to unite with such a society. A constitution was adopted, and officers chosen. The name given was "Woman's American Baptist Home Mission Society" (WABHMS). Its objects were, "The evangelization of the women among the freed-people, the Indians, the heathen immigrants, and the new settlements of the West." Laurana B. Banvard was made President; Mrs. A. J. Loud, Vice President; Mrs. Thomas Nickerson, Corresponding Secretary; Sophia B. Packard, Treasurer. An executive committee of twelve was also chosen. Mrs. A. P. Mason, and Mrs. A. Pollard were appointed to prepare a paper for the churches, in the interest of the Society. Later, this committee presented a paper entitled "An appeal from the Woman's Baptist Home Mission to the Women of New England". Three thousand of these appeals were printed and circulated, and were also sent to editors of Baptist denominational papers throughout New England. Dr. A. P. Mason also prepared a leaflet showing the need of a Woman's Home Mission Society, and 10,000 of these were circulated.

The first Circle, auxiliary to the Society, was formed at Jamaica Plain; and the first money (US$50), was sent in March, 1878, to aid Harriet Newell Hart in her work among the African American people in a little village in Georgia. In March, a committee was appointed to secure an act of incorporation. On May 20, 1878, the Society was legally incorporated as the "Woman's American Baptist Home Mission Society". On May 24, Mrs. Thomas Nickerson, who had just returned from the south and west, met the Board of Directors, and urged the need of pushing forward the Home Mission work. In June of this year, Dr. Cutting, Corresponding Secretary of the American Baptist Home Mission Society, met the women of the Board and talked with them of the Home field, and its urgent need of woman's work. In August, Mrs. Banvard was appointed to prepare a paper for circulation among churches and associations. A public meeting of the Society was held September 18, in the vestry of Tremont Temple. In September, Packard was elected Corresponding Secretary in place of Mrs. Nickerson, whose health compelled her resignation; and Mrs. Pollard was made Treasurer in place of Miss Packard. The first public meeting outside of Boston, was in September, in connection with the State Convention, at Hyannis, Massachusetts. The First Annual Meeting was at the Clarendon Street Baptist Church, Boston, November 14, 1878; five teachers were reported in their fields of labor, two were under appointment, and the receipts of the year totaled US$1,533.

In 1880, the society sent Packard on a trip to assess the living conditions of black people in the South. She visited homes, schools, and churches in Richmond, Nashville, and New Orleans. She returned to Boston to report the bleak findings of her Southern pilgrimage and proposed a school for women and girls. The society was unwilling to support the idea of a new school, reasoning that the South was too hostile, they did not have the funds, and that Packard (age 56) and Giles (age 48) were too old. Packard sold personal possessions to raise money and planned a school in Atlanta near Morehouse College, supported by the American Baptist Home Mission Society. The Women's Society reversed its original decision and, in March 1881, commissioned Packard and Giles as missionaries and teachers to begin a school in Atlanta.

On April 11, 1881, in the basement of Friendship Baptist Church in Atlanta, the Atlanta Baptist Female Seminary (now, Spelman College) opened with 11 students. Within three months, enrollment had grown to 80 and additional teachers were sent by the Women's Society. The ABHMS provided a down payment for a new campus, but pressure was exerted by the ABHMS to merge the men's school with the women's school to create a co-education seminary. The women resisted and, in 1882, had an opportunity to meet with John D. Rockefeller at the Wilson Avenue Baptist Church in Cleveland. Laura Spelman Rockefeller and her sister Lucy had been students at Oread, 1858–1859, and had met Packard and Giles on a visit in 1864. Packard's vision for the future of the school, financial astuteness, and missionary piety secured assistance from Rockefeller. Mr. and Mrs. Rockefeller visited the school in 1884 on the school's third anniversary. The debt on a new campus with five frame buildings, formerly used as a barracks for the Union Army occupying Atlanta, was discharged, and the school was renamed Spelman Seminary for Women and Girls in honor of Laura Rockefeller's parents. Packard was treasurer and president of Spelman Seminary from its charter in 1888 until her death in 1891. There were 464 students and 34 faculty at the time of her death.

== Mergers ==
In 1891, Alice Blanchard Coleman became president of the Woman's American Baptist Home Mission Society and held that position until April, 1911, when, by the consolidation of the Woman's American Baptist Home Mission Society, headquarters in Boston, and the Woman's Baptist Home Mission Society, headquarters in Chicago, a new national organization was formed having the name of the Boston organization but with headquarters in Chicago. Coleman was the first vice-president of the new organization and president of the New England Branch of the Woman's American Baptist Home Mission Society, the branch being a local organization whose purpose was the holding of inspirational meetings and otherwise fostering the work of the Woman's American Baptist Home Mission Society.

In 1955, the WABHMS merged with the American Baptist Home Mission Society of the American Baptist Churches USA.

== Notable people ==
- Alice Blanchard Coleman
- Harriet E. Giles
- Rahme Haider
- Joanna P. Moore
- Sophia B. Packard
- Belle L. Pettigrew
