= Soldiers' Home =

Coordinates: 41.8310°N 87.6077°W

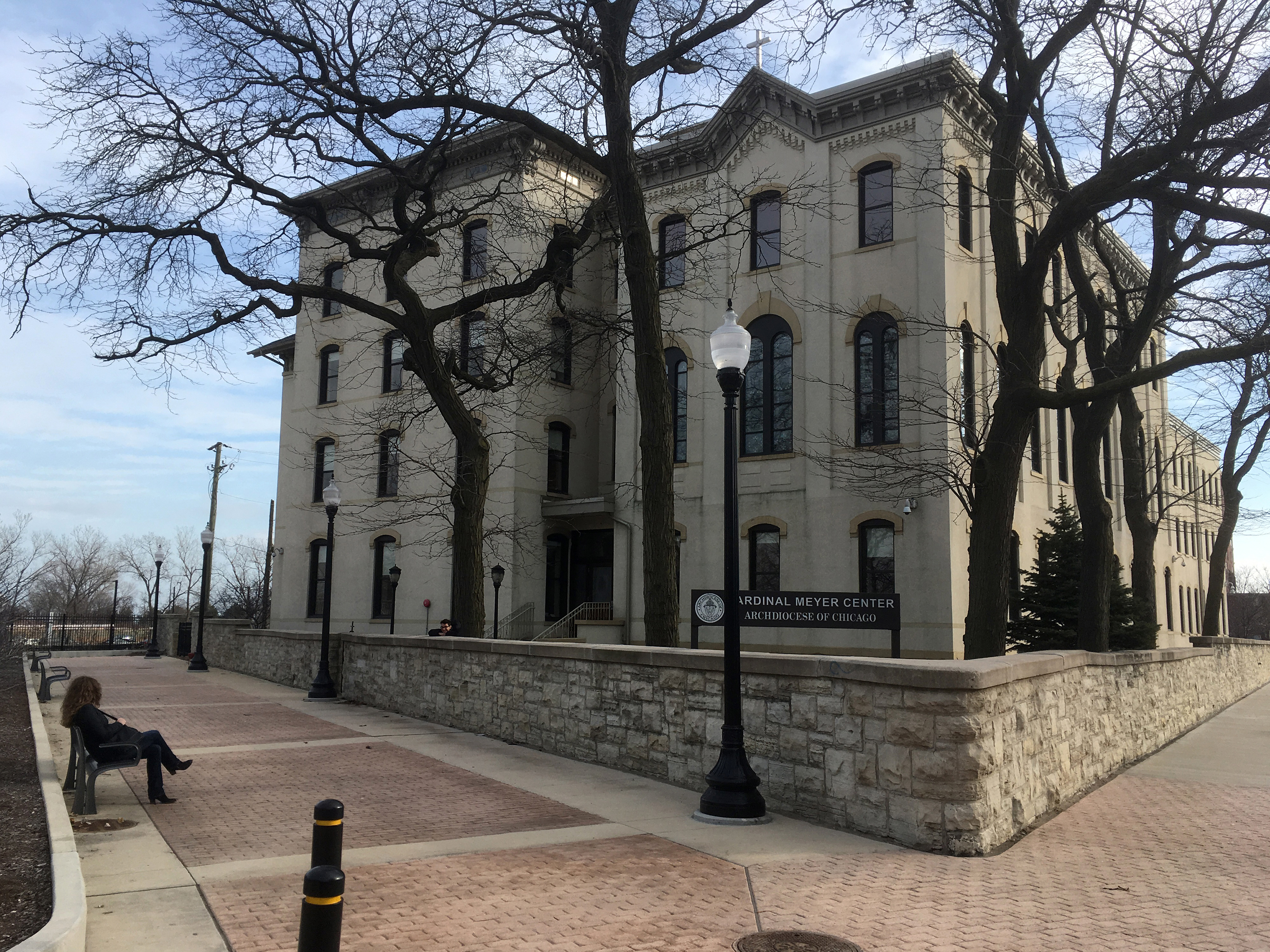
- Soldier's Home, now owned by the Archdiocese of Chicago
- Interactive map of the Soldiers' Home area

General information
- Architectural style: Italianate style
- Location: 739 E. 35th Street, Chicago, Illinois
- Construction started: 1864
- Completed: 1923

Design and construction
- Architect: William W. Boyington

Chicago Landmark
- Designated: April 16, 1996

The Soldiers' Home is an historic Italianate style building in Chicago, Illinois, United States. Located at 739 E. 35th Street, the Home was built in a series of phases from 1864 to 1923, designed by William W. Boyington and other architects. It was designated a Chicago Landmark on April 16, 1996. The Soldiers' Home is the last surviving building in Chicago with direct association to the American Civil War: during the war, the oldest part of the home was built to serve as a hospital for injured soldiers and after the war, it became a home for disabled and aged Union Army Veterans.

Mary Livermore and Jane Hoge, who had met during the war nursing soldiers at nearby Camp Douglas, conceived the idea of the hospital home, and a fundraising fair to support its building. The initial construction was in substantial part funded by sale of President Abraham Lincoln's handwritten copy of the Emancipation Proclamation. Lincoln donated it to the fundraising fair at Livermore's request, saying, "I had some desire to retain the paper, but if it shall contribute to the relief or comfort of the soldiers, that will be better" (This copy was in the collection of the Chicago Historical Society when it was destroyed in the Great Chicago Fire of 1871. The Soldiers' Home is located south of the city area burned by the great fire and survived.)

In the 21st century, the Soldiers' Home building is used for offices of the Catholic Archdiocese of Chicago, and named, the Cardinal Meyer Center.
