= Lucy Hale Tapley =

American educator (1857–1932)

3rd President of Spelman College
- In office 1910–1927
- Preceded by: Harriet E. Giles
- Succeeded by: Florence M. Read

Personal details
- Born: 1932 West Brooksville, Maine
- Died: 1932 (aged 74–75) Bass Harbor, Maine

Lucy Hale Tapley (1857-1932) was an American educator who became the third president of Spelman College.

== Early life ==
Lucy Hale Tapley was born in West Brooksville, Maine in 1857. Her father, Captain Thomas Tapley, was one of six seafaring brothers. She attended a private school run by a "Miss Lucy Henry" and from Buckport Seminary. She also taught in the West Brooksville public school.

== Career at Spelman College ==
Tapley moved to Atlanta, where she began teaching at the what was then the Spelman Seminary in 1890. She was an English and an arithmetics teacher. Tapley rose through the ranks of the staff. She became the principal of the elementary school and, in 1903, took over the teachers professional course. She was known throughout the South for her work training teachers and her influence in rural communities. She later became the Normal Department's superintendent and the seminary's dean. She served as head of the Teachers Professional Department for six years. In 1910, following president Harriet Giles's 1909 death, Tapley was appointed president of Spelman.

Tapley enforced strict codes of dress and conduct at Spelman and required "a strict adherence to the rules." As the public sector began providing more primary and secondary education for Black children, Spelman could focus on higher education. Tapley was instrumental in eliminating Spelman College's debt. Under her leadership, Spelman Seminary established a home economics department, and increased the annual budget from $35,000 to $140,000. Tapley secured funds from the General Education Board for a chapel and a science building. The school dedicated three buildings, Bessie Strong Hall, Laura Spelman Rockefeller Memorial Building, and Tapley Hall, named in Tapley's honor in 1925. Spelman also began to focus more on students' social lives. In 1924, the school officially became Spelman College.

In 1927, after working at Spelman for thirty-seven years, Tapley retired. She was named President Emerita by the Spelman College Board of Trustees.

== Death and legacy ==
Tapley died on June 16, 1932, in the Bass Harbor, Maine home of her brother, Dr. Thomas Sumner Tapley.
