= Sophia B. Packard =

American educator

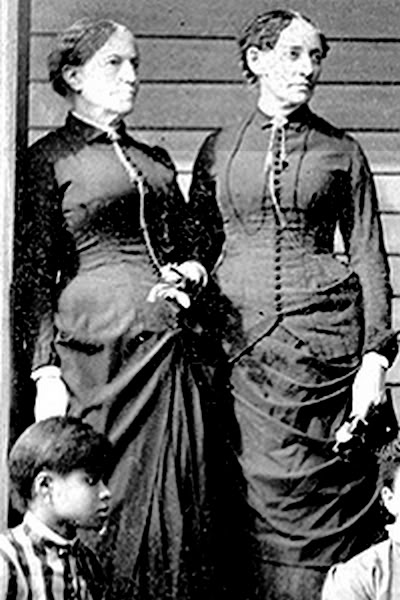
Harriet E. Giles and Sophia B. Packard

Sophia B. Packard (January 3, 1824 – June 21, 1891) was an American educator, cofounder in Atlanta, Georgia, of a school for African American women that would eventually become Spelman College.

== Biography ==
Sophia B. Packard was born in New Salem, Massachusetts, on January 3, 1824. She attended local district school and from the age of 14 alternated periods of study with periods of teaching in rural schools. In 1850 she graduated from the Charlestown Female Seminary, and after teaching for several years she became preceptor and a teacher at the New Salem Academy in 1855. After successfully operating her own school in Fitchburg, Massachusetts, in partnership with her longtime companion, Harriet E. Giles, Packard taught at the Connecticut Literary Institution in Suffield (1859–64). From 1864 to 1867 she was co-principal of the Oread Institute in Worcester, Massachusetts. She then moved to Boston, where she secured in 1870 the position of pastor's assistant under the Reverend George C. Lorimer of the Shawmut Avenue Baptist Church and later of the Tremont Temple Baptist church. In 1877 she presided over the organizing meeting of the Woman's American Baptist Home Mission Society, of which she was chosen treasurer that year and corresponding secretary the next.

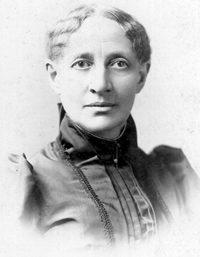
Harriet E. Giles

In 1880 Packard toured the South and decided to open a school for African American women and girls in Georgia. With a gift of $100 from First Baptist Church of Medford, Massachusetts, and a promise of administrative and financial support from the Boston-based Woman's American Baptist Home Mission Society (WABHMS) that sent them, the two women opened a school in the basement of Friendship Baptist Church, an African-American church in southwest Atlanta.

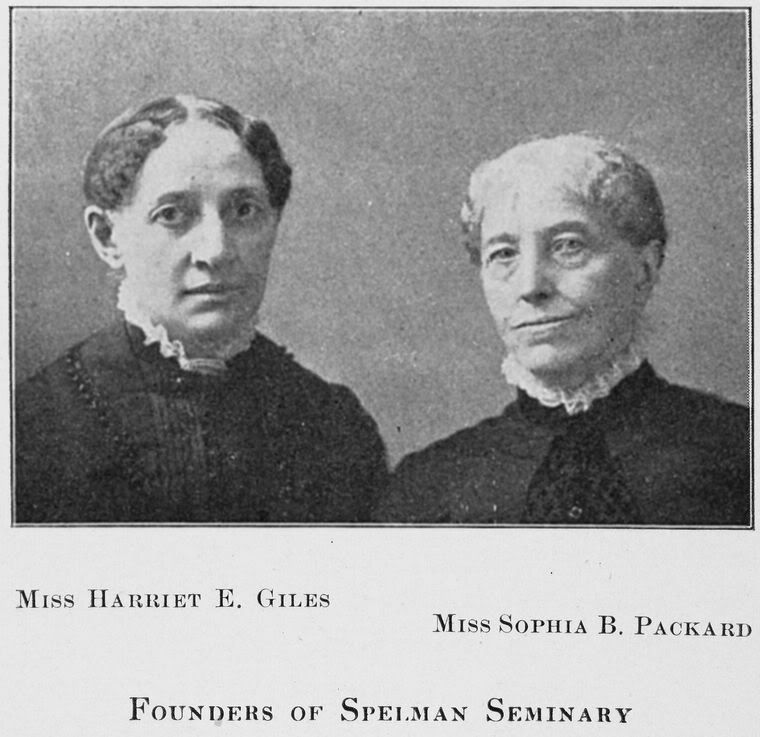
Harriet E. Giles and Sophia B. Packard

Enrollment at the Atlanta Baptist Female Seminary increased rapidly. In addition to teaching in the school, the two women also held prayer meetings, conducted Sunday schools, and taught sewing classes. The American Baptist Home Mission Society (parent of the women's society) made a down payment on a permanent site for the school in 1882, and early in 1883 the school moved to its new home. The balance due was paid in 1884 by John D. Rockefeller, who had been impressed by Packard's vision, and the school was named Spelman Seminary in honour of Rockefeller's wife and her parents. Rockefeller Hall, with offices, a chapel, and dormitory rooms, was built in 1886, and Packard Hall was erected in 1888. With the granting of a state charter in the latter year, Packard became treasurer of the board of trustees. She continued in that post and as president of the school until her death, at which time Spelman Seminary had 464 students and a faculty of 34. Spelman Seminary became Spelman College in 1924, and in 1929 it became affiliated, along with Morehouse College, with Atlanta University.

Sophia B. Packard died in Washington, D.C., on June 21, 1891. She and Giles are buried together at Silver Lake Cemetery, Athol, Massachusetts.
