= Minnie Mary Lee =

American author

Julia Amanda Sargent Wood
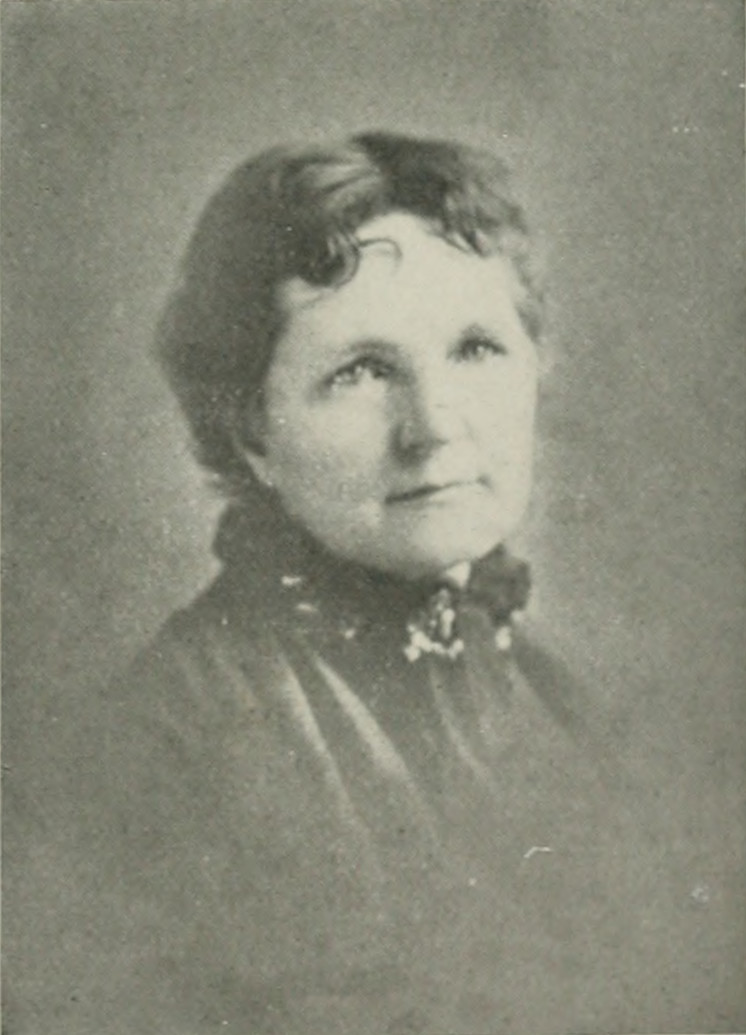
- Photo in A Woman of the Century
- Born: Julia Amanda Sargent; April 13, 1825; New London, New Hampshire, U.S.
- Died: March 9, 1903 (aged 77); St. Cloud, Minnesota, U.S.
- Education: Colby Academy; Charlestown Female Seminary
- Occupation: author
- Spouse: William Henry Wood (m. 1849; died 1870)
- Children: 4
- Writing career
- Pen name: Minnie Mary Lee; Mrs. Julia A. A. Wood
- Genres: poems; stories; sketches; novels

Minnie Mary Lee was a pen name of Julia Amanda Sargent Wood (née, Sargent; after marriage, Wood; April 13, 1825 – March 9, 1903), a 19th-century American sentimental author, of poems, stories, sketches and novels, who sometimes also wrote as Mrs. Julia A. A. Wood. (Note: Her tombstone on findagrave records her name as "Julia A. A. Wood".) She began writing very early in life, but did not publish in book form until she was in her forties. The Heart of Myrrha Lake, Or, Into the Light of Catholicity (New York, about 1871; 2nd edition, 1873); Hubert's Wife: a Story for You (Baltimore, 1875); The Brown House at Duffield: a Story of Life without and within the Fold (Baltimore, 1877); and The Story of Annette and her Five Dolls: Told to dear little Catholic Children (Baltimore, 1880) were her published works. A convert to Roman Catholicism, Wood's novels were on Catholic themes.

== Early life and education ==
Julia Amanda Sargent was born in New London, New Hampshire, April 13, 1825. (Note: Willard & Livermore (1893) record April 13, 1826 as her date of birth. Menil (1904) records 1830. Coggeshall (1860) records circa 1830.) She was a daughter of Ezekiel Sargent and his wife, Emily Everett Adams.

She was educated at the Colby Academy, and the Charlestown Female Seminary, Boston.

== Career ==
Her parents removing to Covington, Kentucky, she was not long afterwards married to William Henry Wood, a practicing lawyer of Greensburg, Kentucky; this was in 1849. Two years later, they removed to Sauk Rapids, Minnesota, on the Mississippi River, being the capital and intellectual center of the commonwealth of Minnesota at that time. The following year, William received the appointment of government Land Receiver. William was a person of literary tastes and ability as a writer and orator. In 1860, the Woods edited a weekly newspaper called, The New Era. William died in 1870.

Wood was widely known by her pen name, "Minnie Mary Lee". She wrote serial tales and shorter stories for the Catholic Times and Opinion and for the Catholic Fireside, both published in Liverpool, England. Wood contributed generously to East Coast ladies' magazines like Arthur's and Godey's Lady's Book, and Jane Swisshelm's paper, The St. Cloud Visitor. She was at different times in editorial work, including with her son, conducting the Sauk Rapids Free Press.

Wood became a convert to the Roman Catholic faith, and wrote several novels more or less advocating the claims of that faith. Among them were The Heart of Myrrha Lake (New York City, 1872), Hubert's Wife (Baltimore, 1873), Brown House at Duffield (1874), Strayed from the Fold (1878), Story of Annette (1878), Three Times Three (1879), and From Error to Truth (New York, 1890). She served as postmaster of Sauk Rapids for four years under the Grover Cleveland administration.

== Personal life ==
Wood did not support the movement for woman's rights and woman suffrage. She believed that woman should work towards suppression of the divorce laws.

Three of Wood's children lived to adulthood, including two sons, both of them journalists, and a daughter; her first-born child died at age three. She died in St. Cloud, Minnesota, March 9, 1903. Jeris Folk Cassel published a biography of her life in 1991.

== Selected works ==
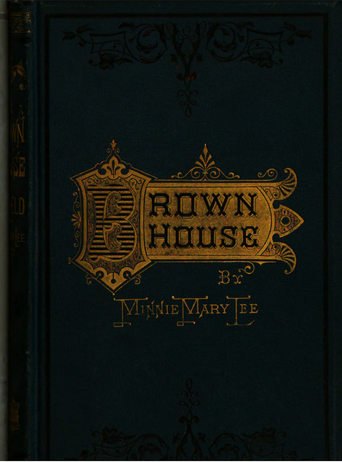
The Brown House at Duffield (1876)

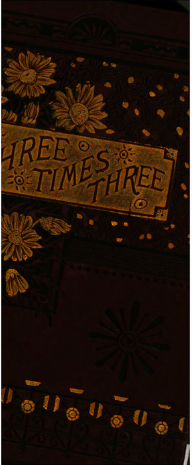
Basil, Beatrice, Ethel (1883)

=== As Minnie Mary Lee ===
- The Heart of Myrrha Lake; or, Into the Light of Catholicity (New York, 1872)
- Hubert's Wife: a Story for You (Baltimore, 1875)
- The Brown House at Duffield: a Story of Life without and within the Fold (Baltimore, 1877)
- Strayed from the Fold : a story of life in the northwest, founded on facts (New York, 1878)
- The Story of Annette and her Five Dolls: Told to dear little Catholic Children (Baltimore, 1880)

=== As Mrs. Julia A. A. Wood ===
- Basil, Beatrice, Ethel, Or, Three-times-three, An Interesting Story of Real Life (1879)
- From Error to Truth (New York, 1890)
