= Council of Women for Home Missions =

Council of Women for Home Missions was an American federated organization of women's missionary societies established in 1908. It was "one of the country's early national ecumenical agencies". While its initial focus was on home mission conferences and home mission study books, its scope increased to include work with migrant populations, Indigenous Americans, World Day of Prayer, legislative matters, and international relations.

== History ==
Composed of eleven constituent home mission boards, it was established in 1908 for the purpose of unifying home mission work and projecting a united study course. Fifty-eight member societies responded. The work was conducted through standing committees composed of members from each constituent board. The council's slogan was, "Our country, God's country". The council represented and promoted Protestant church women's home mission organizations interdenominationally. It did so through conferences, courses, institutes, and schools.

Any national women's home mission board or society agreeing to cooperate in the purposes and work of the council could become a constituent member paying a nominal annual membership fee. If the annual income of the board was US$50,000 or more, it had nine representatives in the council, if the annual income was less than $50,000, it had three representatives. Some of these boards were entirely independent, while others were auxiliary to the general boards of the denominations. Some boards were composed of men and women on an equal basis. Some were for home missions only, and others combined home and foreign missions.

Alice Blanchard Coleman served as president of the council from its beginning, till 1916. M. Katharine Jones Bennett served as president from 1916 through 24. Mrs. John Ferguson was president in 1927.

In 1940, it merged into the Home Missions Council of North America, which, in 1950, became the Division of Home Missions of the National Council of Churches.

== Schools of missions ==
Realizing the potentialities in schools of missions, it desired to serve them in every possible way. Fifteen widely situated interdenominational winter and summer schools were affiliated with the council, which. upon request, suggested leaders and teachers, and when so requested, granted a small sum for three years after affiliation for the purpose of aiding in the procuring of a teacher for the home mission study books.

== Home Missions Institute ==
At Chautauqua, New York, the Council annually conducted a Home Missions Institute along the usual lines of study hours, conferences and denominational rallies. The annual registration was well over 1,000. China, Japan, India, and Siam were represented, as well as most of the states in the U.S. The Council financed this Institute.

== Partnerships ==
=== Missionary Education Movement ===
One result of the Ecumenical Conference on Foreign Missions (1900 : New York, N.Y.) was the publishing of interdenominational study books on foreign mission topics. Immediately the need was also felt for home mission books suitable for study groups, and in 1903, there appeared the first of the home mission series, published by an interdenominational committee of women. A few years sufficed to demonstrate the desirability of a permanent and more formal organization, so in 1908, the Council of Women for Home Missions was established. The women of the various denominations had already learned how to work together on the publishing committee. For some years, the book for adults was the only one sent forth annually, but in 1911, a series for boys and girls was begun. The Young People's Missionary Movement (later renamed, the Missionary Education Movement), had meanwhile been launched and was publishing books for various ages on home and foreign mission themes. The incongruity and inefficiency of having two groups annually publishing interdenominational home mission books led to the formation, in 1918, of a Joint Committee on Home Mission Literature, composed of representatives from each of the two agencies. Neither body relinquished sovereignty or separate entity or the right to publish separately. Both enjoyed and profited by the comradeship; the constituency did not have to decide which of two books to study. A theme for yeara was chosen and books for various ages or for various types of groups were jointly published, as well as accompanying supplemental material. By the early 1920s, 100,000 or more of the books for adults were printed, and proportionately large editions of the books for children and young people. Both bodies sold at wholesale to boards and denominational agencies, the Movement to the general boards, the council to the women's boards. Retail sales were made by the boards to the constituencies.

=== Federation of Woman's Boards of Foreign Missions of North America ===
At one time, an annual "Day of Prayer for Home Missions" began to be celebrated interdenominationally, and also a "Day of Prayer for Foreign Missions". The Council prepared the program for one; the Federation of Woman's Boards of Foreign Missions of North America for the other. In 1919, the two organizations agreed to observe the same date each year the first Friday in Lent. Subsequently, a joint committee each year prepared the program and preliminary "Call to Prayer".

Another joint committee with the Federation served local "women's church and missionary federations". These groups assumed widely divergent names and forms. Some were solely missionary in character. Some confined the membership to the societies of evangelical churches, but included activities not primarily missionary. Some included organizations of a civic or social character. Some cooperated closely with committees having in charge schools of missions. A few were departments of local councils of churches or church federations. Some had a wide range of activities and annually conducted institutes for missionary instruction having paid registrations of several hundreds. Others were dormant a good prat of each year, active only in connection with the observance of the Day of Prayere for Missions. There was at least one state and two county women's federations. The power latent in these local federations had never been adequately tapped. Provision had been made for affiliation of local federations with the council and with the Federation of Women's Boards of Foreign Missions, and aid was rendered to a number in advice as to speakers and leaders of study books, methods of work, and lines of suitable activity. Frequently, these federations took up a collection in connection with the observance of the Day of Prayer for Missions.

=== Home Missions Council ===
Another partner was the Home Missions Council, the similar agency for the general boards. It seemed appropriate to the two Councils to merge committees which faced similar tasks. Therefore, there were more than a dozen active joint committees covering types of work and groups of people in the U.S. and its possessions or dependencies. The membership of these committees was made up from the boards carrying on or interested in missionary work for the specific groups. Interdenominational conferences were planned, programs of activity unitedly formulated, and opportunity for interchange of information and inspiration provided. Through the instrumentality of one committee, various men's and women's boards furnished a religious work director to several government Indian schools. A subcommittee on Farm and Cannery Migrants was composed of a representative appointed by each of the women's boards financially cooperating in the definite work for migrant fruit and vegetable harvesters and cannery workers. A specially designated Secretary of Recruiting served the two Councils, arranging for the presentation of home missions at the summer conferences, striving to help coordinate the recruiting work of the various denominations and agencies, and to correlate and promoted the organization of home service groups.

=== Home Missions Council of North America ===
In 1940 Home Missions Council of North America merged with the Council of Women for Home Missions. In 1950 that organization became the National Council of Churches. Edith Elizabeth Lowry worked with the Council of Women for Home Missions and later the Home Missions Council of North America.

=== Consulting boards ===
Organizations in full accord and sympathy with the aims and methods of the council, but which because of their constitutions and methods of work do not fall into the class eligible for constituency, became consulting organizations and representatives served on committees of the council. The National Board of the Y.W.C.A. and the National Woman's Christian Temperance Union were consulting boards.

== Selected works ==
- The Path of Labor: Christianity And the World's Workers, (Council of Women for Home Missions, New York 1918)
- The Magic Box, Anita B. Ferris (Council of Women for Home Missions and Missionary Education Movement of the United States and Canada, New York, 1922)
- The Trend of the Races: a Home-Mission Study Book, George E. Haynes (Council of Women for Home Missions and Missionary Education Movement of the United States and Canada, New York, 1922)
- In the Vanguard of a Race, L. H. Hammond (Council of Women for Home Missions and Missionary Education Movement of the United States and Canada, New York, 1922)
- Of One Blood: a Short Study of the Race Problem, Robert E. Speer (Council of Women for Home Missions and Missionary Education Movement of the United States and Canada, New York, 1924)
