= George W. Coleman =

American publisher

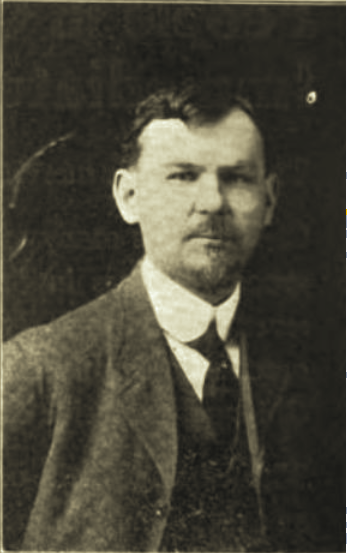
Coleman in 1911

George W. Coleman (June 16, 1867 – July 31, 1950) was an American publisher.

== Early life and education ==
George William Coleman was born, Boston, June 16, 1867. His parents were George and Mary (Carville) Coleman.

Coleman graduated from The English High School, Boston, 1885, receiving the Franklin medal. He received an Honorary A.M. degree from Colby College, 1911.

== Career ==
Coleman served as assistant editor of the Journal of Education, 1885–89. While a correspondent for various journal, he was shipwrecked on a voyage to Buenos Aires. Coleman served as business manager of the New England Magazine, 1890–02. He was the publisher of the house organ of the Walker-Stetson-Sawyer Company, a wholesale dry goods company of Boston. He served as advertising manager of The Gold Rule (later, The Christian Endeavor World), 1893–1905, and as publisher of The Christian Endeavor World from 1905.

Coleman was director and treasurer of the Sagamore Beach Company's summer resort and auditorium, on Cape Cod, since 1904. Coleman was the first to call for a series of annual sociological conferences to meet at Sagamore Beach, beginning in June 1907. He was the originator and director of Sunday Evening Fund hall meetings, begun at Boston, spring of 1907.

He served as director of publicity for William H. McElwain Company, 1910–15. He was the founder and president of the Open Forum National Council.

Coleman was a member of the Boston City Council, 1914-17 (president, 1915). He served as president, Pilgrim Publicity Association, 1909–11; president, Association of Advertising Clubs of America, 1911–13; president, Northern Baptist Convention, 1917–18; and president, Babson Institute, Wellesley Hills, Massachusetts, 1921-.

He was a delegate-at-large for the 1912 Republican National Convention, and for the Massachusetts Constitutional Convention, 1917.

Coleman served as a trustee of the New England Baptist Hospital, and of the World's Christian Endeavor Union. He was a director of various organizations, including the Massachusetts Temperance Society, the Boston Y.M.C.A., and the New England Sabbath Protective League.

He was a member of several clubs, including the Twentieth Century, the Boston City (board of governors, 1914–17), and the Boston Baptist Social Union.

== Personal life ==
On June 30, 1891, he married, in Boston, Alice Blanchard Merriam.

George William Coleman died in Boston, July 31, 1950.

== Selected works ==
- Searchlights, 1909
- The People's Prayers, 1914
- Democracy in the Making, 1915
