= Belle L. Pettigrew =

American educator and missionary

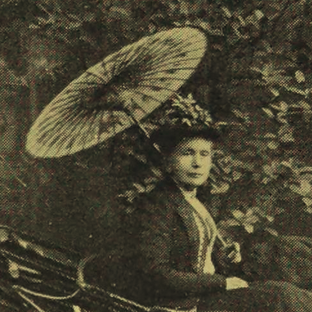
- Belle Pettigrew, 1903, Tokyo
- Born: April 8, 1839; Ludlow, Vermont, U.S.
- Died: July 14, 1912 (aged 73); Sioux Falls, South Dakota, U.S.
- Resting place: Woodlawn Cemetery, Sioux Falls
- Occupations: educator, missionary
- Relatives: Richard F. Pettigrew

Belle Luella Pettigrew (April 8, 1839 – July 14, 1912) was an American educator and missionary. She was a member of the Daughters of the American Revolution and the Anti-Saloon League. She served as head of the missionary and training department of the Woman's American Baptist Home Mission Society, and as South Dakota State superintendent of the press department for the Woman's Christian Temperance Union (W.C.T.U.). Hailing from Vermont, she traveled extensively around the world and lived in many cities in the United States before settling, like her brother Senator Richard Pettigrew, in Sioux Falls, South Dakota, where she died.

== Early life and education ==
Belle Luella (or Luella Belle) Pettigrew was born in Ludlow, Vermont, (Note: Though Leonard (1914) records Belle's place of birth as Evansville, Wisconsin, Tingley & Tingley (1975) record that Belle and other members of the Pettigrew family emigrated from Vermont to Sioux Falls, South Dakota. Further, Christian Herald (1908) records that brother, Richard, and parents removed from Ludlow, Vermont to Evansville, Wisconsin, in 1854.) April 8, 1839. She was the daughter of Andrew Pettigrew (1810–1866) and Hannah Brazer (Sawtell) Pettigrew (1816–1878). One of her brothers, Richard, became a United States Senator from South Dakota. Her other siblings were Hannah, Justin, Alma, Henrietta, Frederick, and Elizabeth.

Andrew Pettigrew was a man of strong convictions, religious, and trained his family according to the moral code common to the New England Christian faith. He was an abolitionist and a distributor of emancipation literature, and a link in the Underground Railroad to assist runaway slaves from the south on their way to Canada. For his outspoken views in opposition to slavery, and his approval of William Lloyd Garrison of Boston, many people boycotted his business and refused to trade in his store, and often threatened him with violence. Her mother, Hannah B. Sawtell, was of Puritan ancestry; her ancestors came to Watertown, Massachusetts, in 1630. They were at the siege of Lewisburg, and Elnathan, her grandfather, was a private soldier at the Battle of Bunker Hill.

Andrew Pettigrew was in poor health and, in 1854, he sold his store and with his family moved to the town of Union, Rock County, Wisconsin, where he purchased a farm and engaged in general farming. In 1860, he moved to Evansville, Wisconsin so that his numerous children could attend the Evansville Academy. In 1863, when the first slaves came north as a result of the Civil War, he gave these African Americans the preference and employed them upon the farm. An ex-slave started a blacksmith shop, and Andrew Pettigrew gave this blacksmith all his work.

Pettigrew graduated from the Rockford Seminary (now Rockford University) in 1859, and afterwards, took special studies, at three different times, in University of Chicago.

== Career ==
After leaving college, she devoted her life to teaching and missionary work. For twelve years, she represented the Woman's Baptist Home Mission Society as missionary among African Americans, teaching at two historically black institutions, Shaw University and Roger Williams University, where she also served as preceptress. She also spent three years as general missionary in South Dakota.

In the fall of 1893, she entered the University of Chicago for six months, then spent seven months traveling in Europe. In 1894, she was the head of the missionary and training department of the Woman's American Baptist Home Mission Society. She later lived for several years in Washington D.C., where was a member of the Columbia Chapter Daughters of the American Revolution, the W.C.T.U. and the Anti-Saloon League, as well as being a member of a missionary society and literary club connected with the Calvary Baptist Church.

In April 1904, she returned from a two years' trip around the world, spending several months in Europe, four in India and Burma, several days in the Philippines, three months in China, a short visit in Seoul, Korea, six months in Japan, three weeks in Hawaii and ten weeks in California, visiting the principal cities from San Francisco to San Diego. She went on the trip as a tourist, but visited more than 100 mission homes of all denominations. She made some trips with missionaries in Burma, China, and Japan, visiting three places in Japan where no foreign woman had been.

== Personal life ==
After living in Evansville, Wisconsin Madison, Wisconsin, La Crosse, Wisconsin, Chicago, Illinois, Raleigh, North Carolina, Atlanta, Georgia, Memphis, Tennessee, Nashville, Tennessee, and Washington, D.C., she became a resident of Sioux Falls, South Dakota in 1904, living in her own home, and was active as local officer and as state superintendent of the press department for the W.C.T.U. In 1908, she served as chair of the Industrial and Child Labor committee of the South Dakota Federation of Woman's Clubs. She remained single, and died July 14, 1912. She is buried at Woodlawn Cemetery in Sioux Falls.
