= Mary Livermore =

American journalist, abolitionist and advocate of women's rights

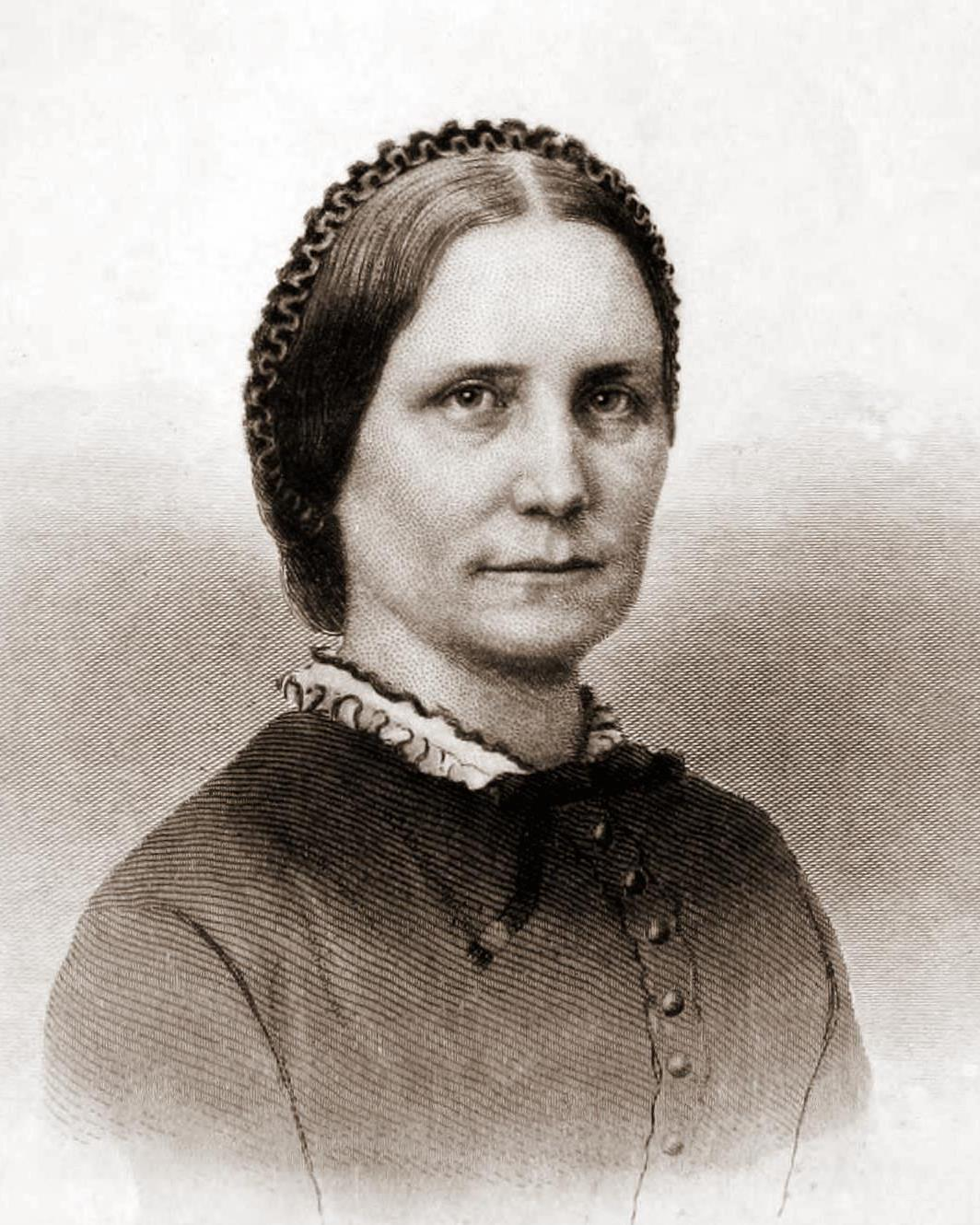
- Livermore in 1867
- Born: Mary Ashton Rice; December 19, 1820; Boston, Massachusetts, U.S.
- Died: May 23, 1905 (aged 84); Melrose, Massachusetts
- Occupations: Journalist, abolitionist, women's rights advocate
- Spouse: Daniel P. Livermore (m. 1845)
- Relatives: Mary Livermore Barrows (granddaughter)
- Writing career
- Notable work: My Story of the War

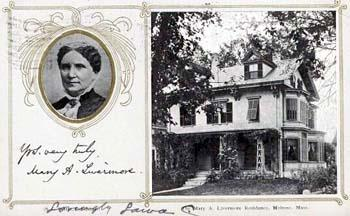
Mary Livermore House in Melrose, Massachusetts

Mary Ashton Livermore (née Rice; December 19, 1820 – May 23, 1905) was an American journalist, abolitionist, and advocate of women's rights. In addition to articles, she published numerous books of poetry, essays, and stories.

When the American Civil War broke out, Livermore volunteered at the regional headquarters of the United States Sanitary Commission at Chicago and worked extensively for it as a nurse and also an organizer. She helped to organize the 1863 North-western Sanitary Fair and in 1887 published her reminiscences of nursing during the war as My Story of the War.

After the war, she instituted a newspaper advocating for women's suffrage called the Agitator, where she continued as an associate editor after its merger with the Woman's Journal. She also lectured widely, mostly on behalf of the women's suffrage and temperance movements. She delivered the historical address for the centennial celebration of the first settlement in the Northwest Territory in Marietta, Ohio on July 15, 1788. For many years, she traveled 25,000 miles (40,000 km) annually and spoke five nights each week for five months of the year.

== Early life and education ==
Mary Ashton Rice was born in Boston, Massachusetts on December 19, 1820, to Timothy Rice and Zebiah Vose Glover (Ashton) Rice. The first of their children to survive infancy, she was directly descended from Edmund Rice, an early Puritan immigrant to the Massachusetts Bay Colony. and came from a military family. Her father fought in the War of 1812 and her mother was a descendant of Captain Nathaniel Ashton of London.

She graduated from the Boston public schools at age 14, receiving a medal for scholarship. There were then no public high school or college options for women, she attended Charlestown Female Seminary in Charlestown, graduating after only two years. As her family was extremely religious, she read the entire Bible every year until the age of 23.

== Career ==
After graduating from the seminary, she remained there for two years teaching Latin and French. In 1839, she was hired as a family teacher on a Virginia plantation, where she became an abolitionist after witnessing the treatment of slaves. She also began work with the temperance movement at this time; she was associated with the Washington Temperance Reform and was an editor for a juvenile temperance paper. In 1842, she left the plantation to take charge of a private school in Duxbury, Massachusetts, where she worked for three years. She also taught at Charlestown.

She married Daniel P. Livermore, a Universalist minister, in May 1845, and in 1857, they moved to Chicago. In that year, her husband established the New Covenant, a Universalist journal of which she became associate editor for twelve years, during which time she frequently contributed to periodicals of her denomination and edited the Lily.

As a member of the Republican party, Livermore campaigned for Abraham Lincoln in the 1860 presidential election. At the party convention in the Chicago Wigwam, she was the only woman reporter accredited. She published a collection of nineteen essays entitled Pen Pictures in 1863.

=== American Civil War ===
Following the outbreak of the Civil War in 1861, she volunteered as an associate member of the United States Sanitary Commission, devoting her full time to it. As an agent of its Chicago branch, later named the Northwestern branch, she attended a council of the National Sanitary Commission at Washington in December 1862, organized many aid societies, visited army posts and hospitals, and in 1863, helped to organize the North-western Sanitary Fair in Chicago, which raised $86,000. President Lincoln donated his own copy of the Emancipation Proclamation, which was auctioned off for $3,000, funding the building of the Soldiers' Home. Livermore eventually became the co-director of the Chicago branch with Jane Hoge, another soldier's aid advocate. The two women completed a hospital inspection tour across Illinois, Kentucky, and Missouri. With a thorough understanding of the needs of the hospitals, Hoge and Livermore sent $1 million worth of food and supplies to hospitals and battlefields most in need.

Livermore, like many other nurses, came up against the issue of women disguised as male soldiers. On a visit to the camp of the 19th Illinois Infantry, a captain pointed out a soldier to Livermore, asking if she noticed anything odd about them. Livermore confirmed the captain's suspicions that the soldier was indeed a woman. The captain called the soldier for questioning, and though she pleaded to stay in service near her beloved, Livermore escorted her out of camp. The soldier escaped Livermore, however, and fled.

Although Livermore had to sacrifice much of her social justice work for nursing, she still managed to publish some kind of content once a week throughout the entirety of the war. She summarized her experience in her 1887 book, My Story of the War. A Woman's Narrative of Four Years' Personal Experience as Nurse in the Union Army, and in Relief Work at Home, in Hospitals, Camps and at the Front during the War of the Rebellion.

== Suffrage and temperance activities ==
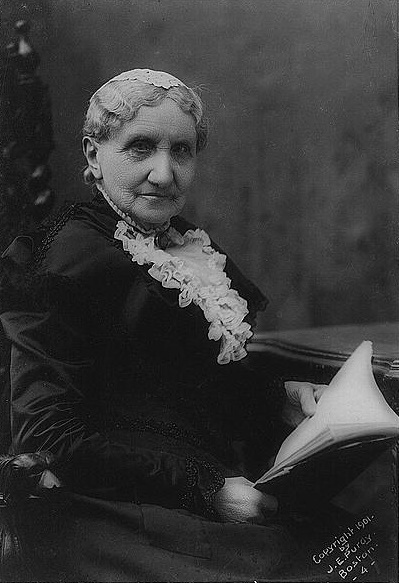
Mary Livermore, 1901

Livermore had long been active in the temperance movement, publishing temperance stories from the 1840s. After the war, she devoted herself to promoting temperance and also to the women's suffrage movement. In 1868, she co-founded the Chicago Sorosis Club with Myra Bradwell and Kate Doggett. This was the first women's group in Chicago to advocate for woman suffrage. The group organized the first woman suffrage convention in Chicago, also in 1868.

In 1869, the year that women suffragists in the Equal Rights Association split over the issue of voting rights for Black men, Livermore sided with Lucy Stone and those founding the American Woman Suffrage Association. Also in 1869, she founded and edited a suffragist journal called The Agitator, which was "devoted to the interests of women". She published 37 issues of the journal that year. In 1870, the Livermores moved to Boston, and she became active in suffrage activities there. The Agitator was merged into the Woman's Journal, the suffrage journal founded by Lucy Stone, and Livermore became associate editor. She served in that role for two years.

Joining with Stone, Henry Blackwell and Julia Ward Howe, Livermore helped found the Massachusetts Women's Suffrage Association. She became president of the American Woman Suffrage Association, and was also the first president of the Association for the Advancement of Women.

== Spiritualism ==
Livermore was interested in spiritualism, which grew in popularity after the Civil War, especially among Unitarians. After her husband died in 1899, she believed she was able to continue to communicate with him through a medium.

== Death and legacy ==
Livermore died in Melrose, Massachusetts, on May 23, 1905.

The Mary A. Livermore School in Melrose, operational from 1891 to 1933, was an elementary school named for her. In 1943, nearly four decades after her death, she became the namesake of a World War II Liberty ship, the SS Mary A. Livermore.

== Selected works ==
- The Children's Army (1844), temperance stories.
- "The Twin Sisters: or, The History of Two Families," collected in The Two Families; and The Duty that Lies Nearest. Prize Stories (1848), a temperance story.
- A Mental Transformation (1848).
- Nineteen Pen Pictures (1863), short stories.
- Thirty Years Too Late: A True Story: and, One in a Thousand (1878)
- What Shall We Do With Our Daughters? Superfluous Women, and Other Lectures (1883)
- My Story of the War. A Woman's Narrative of Four Years' Personal Experience as Nurse in the Union Army, and in Relief Work at Home, in Hospitals, Camps and at the Front during the War of the Rebellion (1887); republished 1995 as My Story of the War: The Civil War Memories of the Famous Nurse, Relief Organizer and Suffragette, with introduction by Nina Silber. New York: Da Capo Press; ISBN 0-3068-0658-4
- A Woman of the Century (1893) (ed. Willard, Frances E. & Livermore, Mary A.) – online available in Wikisource.
- The Story of My Life; or, The Sunshine and Shadow of Seventy Years (1897).
- Cooperative Womanhood in the State (1891). North American Review 153:4, pp. 283–295. JSTOR 25102243

== See also ==
- List of suffragists and suffragettes
- List of women's rights activists
- Timeline of women's suffrage
