= M. Katharine Jones Bennett =

American philanthropist and church leader (1864-1950 )

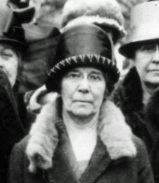
- Born: Mary Katharine Jones; November 28, 1861; Englewood, New Jersey, U.S.
- Died: April 11, 1950 (aged 88); Englewood, New Jersey, U.S.
- Education: Elmira College

M. Katharine Jones Bennett (November 28, 1861 – April 11, 1950) was an American philanthropist known for her work with the Woman's Board of Home Missions, the Council of Women for Home Missions, and the Presbyterian Board of National Missions.

== Biography ==
Bennett née Jones was born on November 28, 1861 in Englewood, New Jersey. She graduated from Elmira College in 1885.

As a young women Bennett was involved in religious and social service mainly through activities with home missions, which were activities that benefited populations within the United States as opposed to activities in other nations. Early in her life Bennett served as secretary for the Woman’s Board of Home Missions of the Presbyterian Church and the College Settlements Association.

In 1898 she married Fred Smith Bennett. The couple was active in the Whittier House settlement house.

Bennett was president of the Woman's Board of Home Missions from 1909 through 1923. Bennett served as president of the Council of Women for Home Missions from 1916 through 1924. Bennett was a contributor to "The Path of Labor: Christianity and the world's workers" published by the Council of Women for Home Missions in 1918. She served on the board of the Presbyterian Board of National Missions from 1923 through 41.

Bennett died on April 11, 1950 in Englewood.
