= George C. Lorimer =

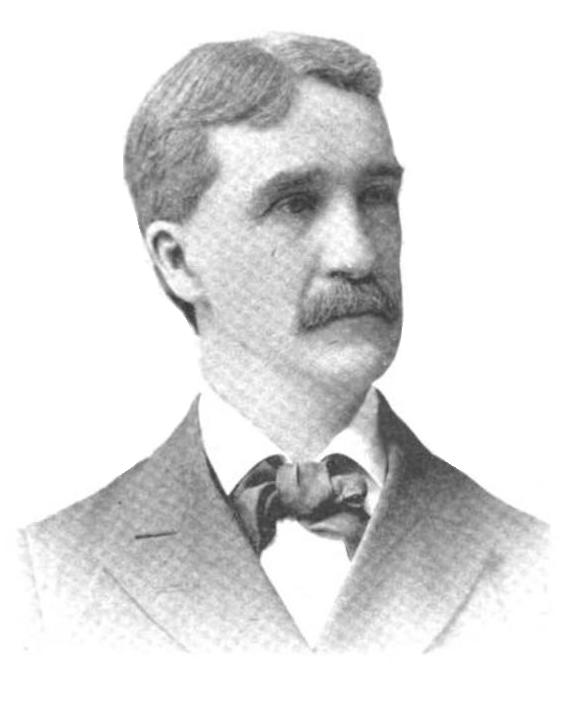
Sketch of George C. Lorimer published in 1893

George Claude Lorimer (June 4, 1838 – September 8, 1904) was a noted reverend, and was pastor of several churches around the United States, most notably the Tremont Temple in Boston, Massachusetts.

== Biography ==
Born in Edinburgh, Scotland, Lorimer came to the United States in 1856 in the hopes of becoming an actor. Coming eventually to Louisville, Kentucky, he came under the influence of Reverend W.W. Everts, who turned Lorimer to Christianity. Lorimer graduated from Georgetown College, Kentucky, in 1859. He was ordained in the Baptist Ministry, first holding brief pastorates in Harrodsburg, Kentucky and Paducah, Kentucky, and then for eight years at the Walnut Street Baptist Church in Louisville, Kentucky. After another brief term in Albany, New York, he next took up an office at the Tremont Temple in Boston, where he would serve as pastor for 21 years, with some interruptions. Noted educator Sophia B. Packard served for some time as his assistant.

Early in February 1879 the financially distressed First Baptist Church of Chicago extended a call to Lorimer to go there from the Tremont Temple, and on May 4, 1879, he preached his first sermon as pastor of the Chicago congregation. Lorimer's pastorate was "successful in the highest degree", and by January 1881, the church raised sufficient means to pay a substantial portion of its debt. On September 25, 1881. Lorimer delivered his farewell sermon in Chicago, returning to the Tremont Temple and leaving a gift of $1,600 to the reorganized Chicago congregation. In 1901 he took up a new pastorate for the last time, at the Madison Avenue Baptist Church in New York City. He died of pneumonia at Aix-les-Bains, and was interred in Philadelphia, Pennsylvania. In addition to his preaching duties, Lorimer was the author of "many widely-read books on religious and social topics".

Lorimer was married to Belle Burford, with whom he had three daughters and a son, publisher George Horace Lorimer.
