= Alice Blanchard Coleman =

- president, Woman's American Baptist Home Mission Society; president, Council of Women for Home Missions

Personal details
- Born: Alice Blanchard Merriam; May 7, 1858 Boston, Massachusetts, U.S.
- Died: October 22, 1936 (aged 78)
- Denomination: Baptist
- Spouse: George W. Coleman (m. 1891)
- Occupation: Christian missionary society leader
- Education: Bradford Academy

Alice Blanchard Coleman (née, Merriam; pen name, Mrs. George W. Coleman; May 7, 1858 – October 22, 1936) was an American missionary society leader. She served as president of the Woman's American Baptist Home Mission Society and of the Council of Women for Home Missions (1908–16). Coleman was a trustee of Hartshorn Memorial College, Richmond, Virginia; Spelman Seminary (now Spelman College), Atlanta, Georgia; and the New England Baptist Hospital, Boston. Writing as "Mrs. George W. Coleman", she made at least two contributions to periodical literature, "The Women's Congress of Missions", 1915, and "Recent developments in Mormonism", 1918. All of Coleman's life was spent in the old South End of Boston.

== Early life and education ==
Alice Blanchard Merriam was born in Boston, Massachusetts, May 7, 1858. Her parents were James Whyte Merriam (1828-1881), who was employed by the Boston City Missionary Society, and Ellen Maria (Blanchard) Merriam (d. 1896). A sister, Helen Whyte Merriam (b. 1868) was the only sibling.

She was graduated from the Everett Grammar School in 1873, and immediately went abroad with her parents for nine months, spending a large part of the time in London and Paris, and absorbing with great eagerness all that fitted on to the studies of the grammar school, especially the history of England. In September, 1874, she entered Bradford Academy (later, Bradford College), in Bradford, Massachusetts, the oldest academy in New England for young women, where she studied under Miss Annie E. Johnson, its principal, and one of the best-known educators of that time. The four years of boarding school life were marked by the awakening of the missionary spirit and by the resolve to herself to become a foreign missionary. She graduated in 1878, with the expectation of spending one year in the further study of Latin and Greek in order to fit herself for Smith College, but her eyes, already a source of trouble and anxiety, again gave out and all thought of further study or of any life work which would involve language study had to be abandoned.

== Career ==
In the fall of 1879, the Woman's Home Missionary Association (Congregational) was organized in Boston under the leadership of her former principal, Annie E. Johnson. The purpose of the association was the prosecution of educational and missionary work among the women and children of the U.S., especially among the various races and religions. This opened the door for Coleman's entrance into the work of home missions which became the main work of her life. At the request of the directors of the association, she visited all its fields of work in 1884 in order to prepare herself to speak of the work among the churches. The trip covered the country as far west as Utah and as far south as Texas, including the work among the African Americans, Native Americans, Mormons, and pioneer settlements. The next year was spent in visiting the churches and marked the beginning of her platform work.

In 1886, she transferred her denominational relationship to a Baptist church, and at once became a member of the board of directors of the Woman's American Baptist Home Mission Society, thus continuing her activity in home mission work and as a speaker among the churches. Various lines of church work also claimed a considerable share of her time and strength. In 1891, she became president of the Woman's American Baptist Home Mission Society and held that position until April, 1911, when, by the consolidation of the Woman's American Baptist Home Mission Society, headquarters in Boston, and the Woman's Baptist Home Mission Society, headquarters in Chicago, a new national organization was formed having the name of the Boston organization but with headquarters in Chicago. Coleman was the first vice-president of the new organization and president of the New England Branch of the Woman's American Baptist Home Mission Society, the branch being a local organization whose purpose was the holding of inspirational meetings and otherwise fostering the work of the Woman's American Baptist Home Mission Society.

In December, 1906, the Interdenominational Committee of Women for Home Mission Conferences for the East was formed to provide for and to conduct a summer conference in Northfield, Massachusetts. For the first three years, she served the committee as its president, and thereafter, a member of the governing body.

As a result of the formation of similar committees in different parts of the country, the Council of Women for Home Missions was organized in November, 1908, and Coleman served as president of the council from its beginning, till 1916.

The Home Mission work brought Coleman into a close relationship to the schools and colleges provided for African-Americans of the South and Coleman was a trustee of Hartshorn Memorial College, Richmond, Virginia, and of Spelman Seminary, Atlanta, Georgia. She also served as a trustee of the New England Baptist Hospital, Boston.

Coleman served as president of the Massachusetts Council for Patriotic Service, and as vice-president of the International Council for Patriotic Service. Her activities in connection with the Ford Hall meetings in Boston and the Sagamore Sociological Conference, which met each summer at their summer home, had her warmest sympathy and support though she had no official connection with them. Coleman had, however, been for several years one of the non-resident workers of the Denison House, a settlement house for women in a district largely populated by Syrians and Italians.

Coleman favored woman suffrage. She was a member of the Twentieth Century Club, and served as president of the Women's City Club.

== Personal life ==
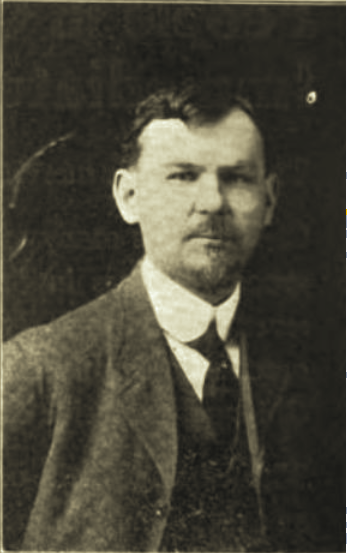
George W. Coleman

On June 30, 1891, she married George W. Coleman of Boston. They had no children.

Alice Blanchard Merriam Coleman died October 22, 1936.

== Selected works ==
- "The Women's Congress of Missions", 1915
- "Recent developments in Mormonism", 1918
