= Charlestown Female Seminary =

Private all-female school in Massachusetts, United States

- Charlestown, Massachusetts, Massachusetts; United States

Information
- Type: Private, All-Female
- Religious affiliation: Christian
- Established: 1831
- Founder: Dr. William Collier; Dr. Henry Jackson
- Head of school: Mrs. Martha Whiting

Charlestown Female Seminary was a Christian school in Charlestown, Massachusetts. Opened in 1830, the female seminary was the second school in Charlestown for young women.

== Background ==
The establishment of Charlestown Female Seminary was part of a movement to facilitate the education of young women that took root in the United States in the 1820s and 1830s. The movement started in 1814 with the establishment by Catherine Fiske, in Keene, New Hampshire, of the "Young Ladies Seminary." (Note: Emma Hart Willard opened the Middlebury Female Seminary in her home in Middlebury, Vermont the same year.) Another important early school was Emma Willard's Troy Female Seminary, opened in 1821 in Troy, New York.

Charlestown became the site of a pair of what amateur historian Charles Zellner, of the Charlestown Historical Society, called the "earliest boarding schools" for young women. The first of these was the Mount Benedict Academy, a combined Roman Catholic convent and finishing school for young ladies, established in 1828 by Benedict Fenwick, Roman Catholic bishop of Boston. That academy was staffed by Ursuline nuns. Mount Benedict acquired a superior reputation, leading both Catholic and Protestant families to enroll their daughters there. Despite that acceptance, in 1834 the academy was burned by an anti-Catholic mob.

== History ==
The Charlestown Female Seminary, located at 30 Union Street, was established by two First Baptist Church pastors, Dr. William Collier and Dr. Henry Jackson. They opened the school in 1830, but in 1831 it was taken over by Martha Whiting, "one of the pioneers of female education in America," on the suggestion of her pastor, Rev. Jackson. Eventually, Seminary Street was named after the school.

== Distinguished alumnae ==
Sophia B. Packard, American educator, co-founder in Atlanta, Georgia of the predecessor to Spelman College, a school for African American women, graduated from this school in 1850.

Author Mary Hayden Pike matriculated in 1843.

Louise Amelia Knapp Smith Clappe (July 28, 1819 – February 9, 1906) was an early California settler, having sailed there in 1849 with her husband, Dr. Fayette Clapp. She taught for 24 years in the San Francisco Public Schools, from 1854 and retired in 1878. In 1838, Louise Clapp attended the female seminary in Charleston. She was a United States traveler and author and a scientific writer on mining.

Painter Ellen Harrington created paintings including a Portfolio of Exercises and Drawings Done while a student at the academy. They are in the possession of the Shelburne Museum, Shelburne, Vermont 05482. The Parke-Bernet auction catalog states the works are "paintings and drawings [by her] ... as a pupil prior to August 1848; comprising her diploma, two sketchbooks, and six paintings, the latter appearing on the front and back cover of three composition books. The Shelburne Museum collection contains the diploma and three composition books, but not the two sketchbooks."

Mary Livermore (December 19, 1820 – May 23, 1905) was an important person in the women's suffrage movement, an author and publisher.

Rowena Felt Baldwin (December 4, 1823—December 16, 1885) was a pioneer in Protestant education in San Antonio, Texas. And, upon marrying John Vance on January 26, 1850, became a pioneer mercantile- and lodging-owner in Castroville, Texas. Her paintings were used in restoring the Landmark Inn State Historic Site.

== See also ==
- H. B. Goodwin
- Women in education in the United States
