= Harriet E. Giles =

American educator

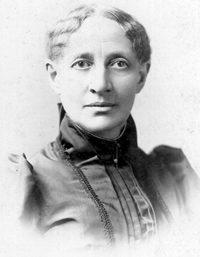
Harriet E. Giles

Harriet Elizabeth "Hattie" Giles (1828 – November 12, 1909) was an American educator, cofounder in Atlanta, Georgia, of a school for African American women that would eventually become Spelman College.

== Life ==
Harriet E. Giles was born in New Salem, Massachusetts.

Harriet E. Giles and Sophia B. Packard (January 3, 1824 – June 21, 1891) were two teachers from the Oread Institute of Worcester, Massachusetts. Giles and Packard had met around 1855 while Giles was a student and Packard the preceptor of the New Salem Academy in New Salem, Massachusetts, and fostered a lifelong friendship there. They never married and considered each other their "companions".

== Career ==
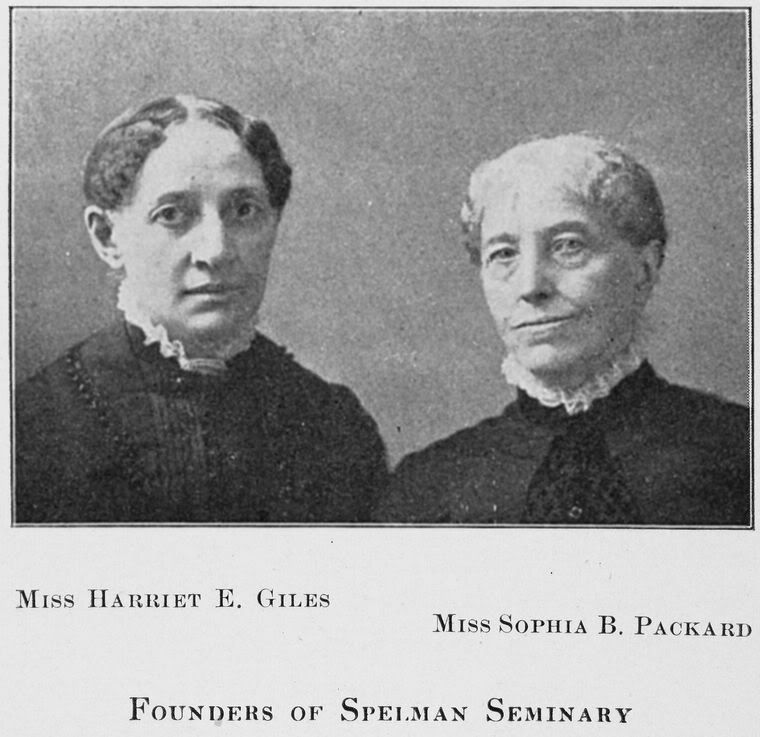
Harriet E. Giles and Sophia B. Packard

After a short-lived attempt to operate her own school, Rollstone School, in Fitchburg, Massachusetts, she accepted a position at the Oread Collegiate Institute in 1867. After leaving Oread, she became a private tutor in the Boston Area.

Giles and Packard co-founded in 1877 the Woman's American Baptist Home Mission Society, supporting missionary women bringing education to the African-American and Native American communities.

In 1880, Giles with Packard toured the South and decided to open a school for African American women and girls in Georgia. With a gift of US$100 from First Baptist Church of Medford, Massachusetts, and a promise of administrative and financial support from the Boston-based Woman's American Baptist Home Mission Society (WABHMS) that sent them, the two women opened a school in the basement of Friendship Baptist Church, an African-American church in southwest Atlanta.

In 1884, the name of the school was changed to the Spelman Seminary in honor of Laura Spelman, John D. Rockefeller's wife, and her parents, who were longtime activists in the anti-slavery movement.

== Death ==
Packard became treasurer of the board of trustees and she continued in that post and as president of the school until her death, at which time Spelman Seminary had 464 students and a faculty of 34. Giles assumed the presidency in 1901, until her death on November 12, 1909. Giles Hall was dedicated in her honor in 1893.

Packard and Giles are buried together at Silver Lake Cemetery, Athol, Massachusetts.
