= Edith Elizabeth Lowry =

1897-1970, interdenominational leader in home mission work

- Born: March 23, 1897; Plainfield, New Jersey, U.S.
- Died: March 11, 1970 (aged 72); Claremont, New Hampshire, U.S.
- Education: Wellesley College

Edith Elizabeth Lowry (March 23, 1897 – March 11, 1970) was an American interdenominational leader in home mission work. She is known for her advocacy of migrant workers through the Council of Women for Home Missions (CWHM) and later the Home Missions Council of North America.

== Biography ==
Lowry was born on March 23, 1897, in Plainfield, New Jersey. She graduated from Wellesley College in 1920.

Although she was a lifelong member of the Baptist faith, Lowry began her home mission career in the early 1920s employed as a staff member for the Presbyterian Board of National Missions. In 1926 she stated working for the interdenominational Council of Women for Home Missions. In 1929 she was promoted to migrant program director of the CWHM. During the Great Depression Lowry was involved with improving the health and housing of migrant workers. Her booklet They Starve that We May Eat: Migrants of the Crops was published in 1938.

In 1940 CWHM merged with the Home Missions Council of North America. In 1950 that organization became the National Council of Churches (NCC). Lowry worked for the NCC until the early 1960s. She was a consultant to the National Council on Agricultural Life & Labor (NCALL) from 1962 through 1964.

Lowry's career spanned the American Depression and World War II. Her involvement spanned education, health, nutrition, and recreation for migrant workers and their families. Career highlights included establishing day-care centers for children of migrant workers and educating workers on Social Security benefits. She was the first woman to speak on National Radio Pulpit in 1939.

Lowry died on March 11, 1970, in Claremont, New Hampshire.
