= Jane Currie Blaikie Hoge =

American nurse (1811–1890)

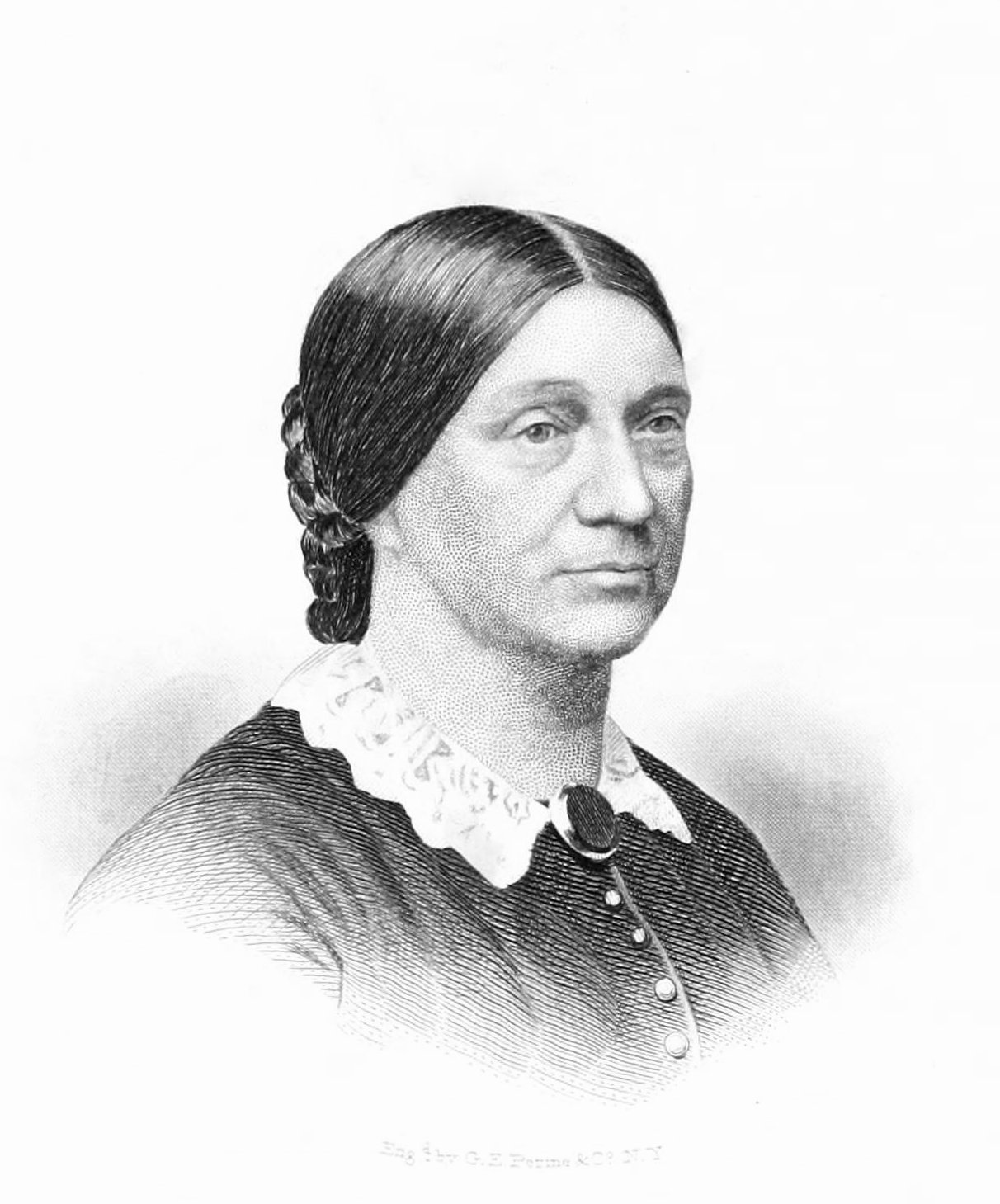
Jane Currie Blaikie Hoge

Jane Currie Blaikie Hoge (July 31, 1811 – August 26, 1890) was a welfare worker, fund raiser, and nurse during the American Civil War. She was a founder of a homeless shelter in Chicago before the war. After the war, she raised funds, helped organize and served on the board of trustees of the Evanston College for Ladies. She served as head of the Woman's Presbyterian Board of Missions of the Northwest for thirteen years.

== Early life ==
Hoge was born in Philadelphia, Pennsylvania on July 31, 1811, to George Dundas Blaikie and Mary Monroe. She was educated at the Young Ladies College in Philadelphia. She married Abraham Holmes Hoge on June 2, 1831. They had thirteen children, eight of whom lived to maturity. She moved from Pittsburgh to Chicago in 1848.

== Social work career ==
Hoge was a founder of the Chicago Home for the Friendless in 1858. She was active in recruiting nurses for the Union Army during the Civil War and recounted her experiences in her 1867 memoir The Boys in Blue. Hoge co-administered the Chicago Sanitary Commission (1862–1865) with Mary Livermore. The volunteer organization raised funds and collected and distributed medical supplies and food to soldiers of the Union Army.

In 1871, she organized the fund raising for the Evanston Illinois College for Ladies, which opened in that year. She served on the college's board until it merged with Northwestern University in 1874. She was head of the Woman's Presbyterian Board of Foreign Missions in the Northwest from 1872 to 1885.

== Death and legacy ==
Jane Currie Blaikie Hoge died in Chicago, Illinois, on August 26, 1890, aged 79.
