= Jitsuo Morikawa =

American Baptist preacher (1912–1987)

- Born: 1912; Hammond, British Columbia
- Died: 20 July 1987 (aged 74–75); Michigan
- Education: Southern Baptist Theological Seminary, UCLA
- Occupations: Baptist pastor and denominational leader
- Organization: American Baptist Churches

Jitsuo Morikawa (1912 – July 20, 1987), was a Japanese-American Baptist pastor and denominational leader. He was a pastor at the First Baptist Church in Chicago and interim senior minister of Riverside Church in Manhattan, and an executive at American Baptist Churches USA.

== Early life ==
Morikawa was born in Hammond, British Columbia, to Buddhist parents, and he was the youngest son of his father Yasutarō and mother Tora Morikawa.

He became a Christian at age of 16, and was ordained in 1937 at a Baptist church in Pasadena, California.

== Education and career ==
He graduated from the Southern Baptist Theological Seminary and UCLA for his bachelor's degree.

He wanted to become a missionary but his Japanese ancestry was a barrier to service. He later relocated to serve as West Coast pastor to three Japanese American Baptist congregations in the Los Angeles area. During World War II, he was forcibly placed at the Poston Internment Camp, with over 18,000 other Japanese-Americans and preached for one and half years in the camp and relocation center.

Later he was released by some Baptist leaders and from 1944 to 1956 was pastor at First Baptist Church of Chicago. He was the first Japanese among two non-Americans to be installed as pastor in Chicago Baptist church by Eric L. Titus. He was made assistant pastor of Chicago Baptist church before the Japanese America Baptist congregation was formed, before he was installed he was associated member with the Chicago Federation of Churches. Kichitaro Yamamoto along with Morikawa became pastor of Baptist.

He then served for 19 years at the Valley Forge, Pennsylvania headquarters of American Baptist Churches, many of them as associate executive secretary. He was a vice president of that organization in 1984 and 1985.

He was named interim senior minister of Riverside Church in Manhattan in 1976 and afterward served at Baptist churches in Ridgewood, New Jersey, and at First Baptist Church of Ann Arbor, Michigan. Morikawa became one of the key organizing members of Jubilee Advance.

He helped in the establishment of the University of Michigan Conference on the Teaching of Ethics and Values and received six honorary doctorates of divinity over the course of his life.

== Japanese-America congregation ==
He was the main key role that proclaimed to the resettlement of the Japanese Americans in Hyde Park-Kenwood during the early World War II and had served as pastor in Euro- American congregation together also involving in the first African-American membership in the First Baptist. In 1955, he served as Director of Evangelism of the American Baptist Church leaving the first Baptist till 1956.

After being a youth pastor at the Moneta Gardena and Terminal Island Baptist churches. An evangelism was named after his death, the Jitsuo Morikawa Evangelism Award.

== Personal ==
Morikawa was married to Hazel and had two sons. He died July 20, 1987, of stomach cancer at University of Michigan Hospital.
