= Joanna P. Moore =

American Baptist missionary (1832–1916)

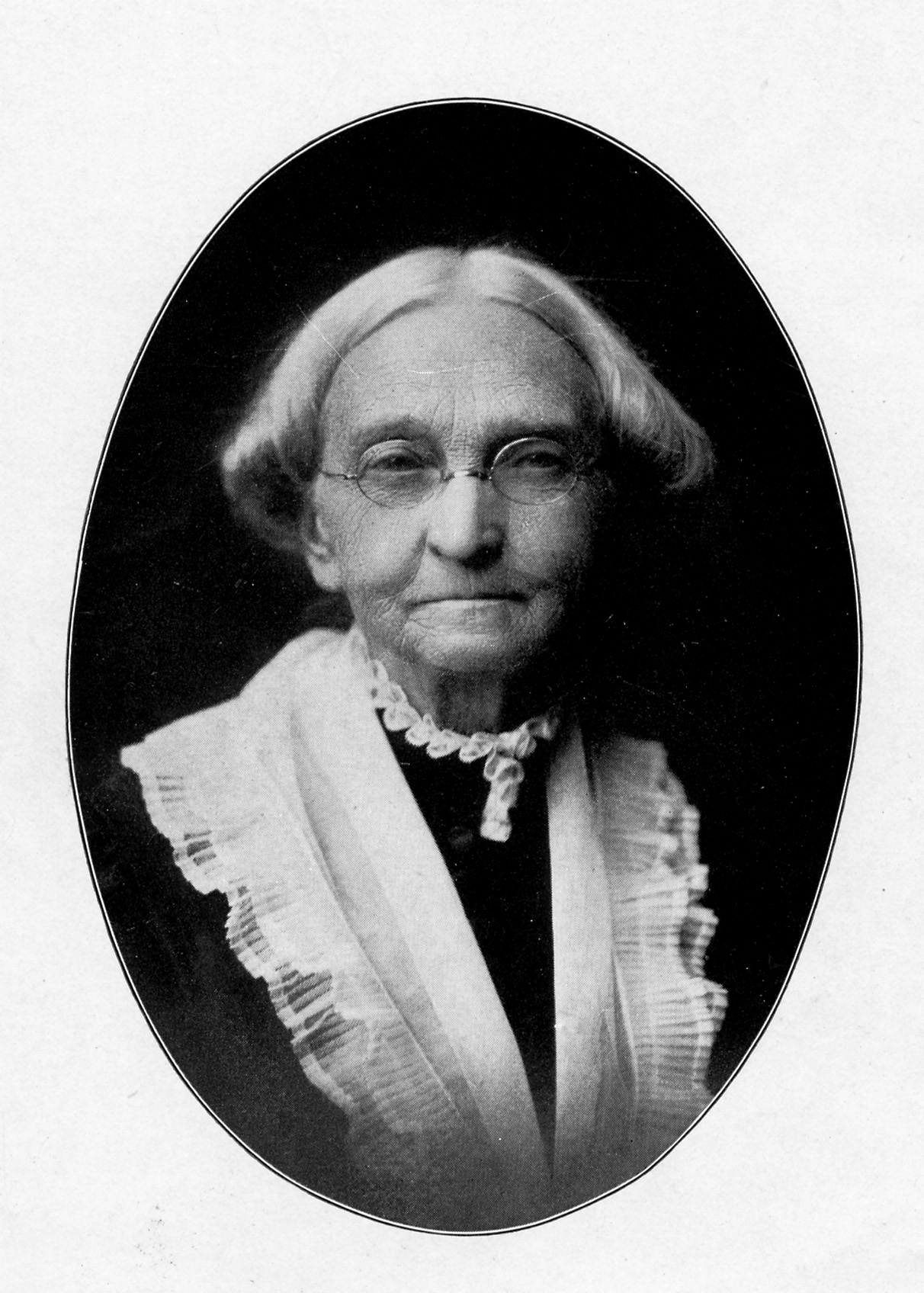

Joanna Patterson Moore (September 26, 1832 – April 15, 1916) was an American Baptist missionary. She was the first white woman missionary appointed by the Woman's American Baptist Home Mission Society, and worked predominantly among black communities of the American south. She founded a series of training schools, and helped organize women's societies. She also founded the monthly magazine Hope, promoting Biblical literacy.

Born in Clarion County, Pennsylvania, she went to Island Number Ten in the Mississippi River in November 1863, to work with around 1,000 black women and children who had gone there seeking protection by the Union Army during the Civil War. She later ministered in Helena, Arkansas, Lauderdale, Mississippi, and New Orleans. In 1902 she published her autobiography, In Christ's Stead. She died in Selma, Alabama.
