= Oread Institute =

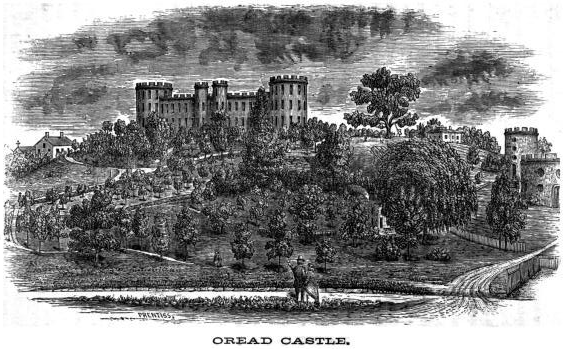
Oread Castle

The Oread Institute was a women's college founded in Worcester, Massachusetts in 1849 by Eli Thayer. Before its closing in 1934, it was one of the oldest institutions of higher education for women in the United States. According to the Worcester Women's History Project:

"The Oread offered three levels of instruction: primary, academic and collegiate. The four-year collegiate program offered a classical, college-level curriculum and is thought to be the first institution of its kind exclusively for women in the country. It was modeled after the program at Brown University, Thayer’s alma mater".

Two graduates of Oread, Sophia Packard and ornamental music teacher Harriet Giles, would eventually found Spelman College, named after Oread graduate Laura Spelman Rockefeller. Laura Spelman was the future wife of John D. Rockefeller, having attended Oread while her future husband, who dropped out of Cleveland's Central High School in the 1850s, worked as a clerk.

Thayer constructed an enormous Gothic-style castle for his new college, complete with turrets. The college closed in 1881.

From 1898 to 1904 the building was the Worcester Domestic Science Cooking School and was finally closed in 1934.

The institute lent its name to Mount Oread, a hill in Lawrence, Kansas, upon which the main campus of the University of Kansas is currently situated. Lawrence was founded in 1854 by settlers from Massachusetts who had been sent there by the New England Emigrant Aid Company, which was created by Eli Thayer.
