= Spelman College =

Historically Black women's college in Atlanta, Georgia, US

- Former names: Atlanta Baptist Female Seminary (1881–1884); Spelman Baptist Seminary (1884–1924)
- Motto: Our Whole School for Christ
- Type: Private historically Black women's liberal arts college
- Established: April 11, 1881; 145 years ago
- Academic affiliations: ACS; Space-grant
- Endowment: $567 million (2025)
- President: Ayanna Howard
- Students: 2,420 (fall 2021)
- Location: Atlanta, Georgia, U.S. 33.746°N 84.411°W
- Colors: Blue, white
- Nickname: Jaguars (former)
- Sporting affiliations: None
- Website: spelman.edu

Spelman College is a private, historically Black, women's liberal arts college in Atlanta, Georgia, United States. It is a founding member of the Atlanta University Center academic consortium. Founded in 1881 as the Atlanta Baptist Female Seminary, Spelman awarded its first college degrees in 1901 and is the oldest private historically Black liberal arts institution for women.

== History ==
=== Founding ===
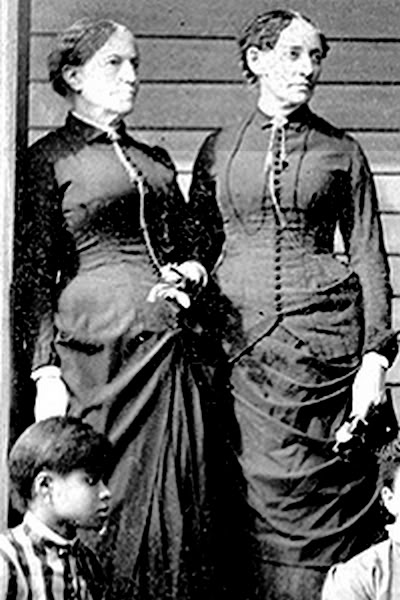
Harriet E. Giles and Sophia B. Packard began Spelman College

The Atlanta Baptist Female Seminary was established on 11 April 1881 in the basement of Friendship Baptist Church in Atlanta by two teachers from the Oread Institute of Worcester, Massachusetts: Harriet E. Giles and Sophia B. Packard. Giles and Packard met while Giles was a student, and Packard the preceptress of the New Salem Academy in New Salem northeast of Springfield, Massachusetts and fostered a lifelong friendship there. The two traveled to Atlanta specifically to begin a school for Black freedwomen and found support from Frank Quarles, the pastor of Friendship Baptist Church.

Giles and Packard started the school with 11 African-American women and $100 given to them by the First Baptist Church in Medford, Massachusetts, in addition to a promise of further support from the Woman's American Baptist Home Mission Society (WABHMS), a group with which they were both affiliated in Boston. Although their first students were mostly illiterate, they envisioned their school becoming a liberal arts institution–the first circular of the college said that they planned to offer "algebra, physiology, essays, Latin, rhetoric, geometry, political economy, mental philosophy (psychology), chemistry, botany, Constitution of the United States, astronomy, zoology, geology, moral philosophy, and evidences of Christianity". Over time they attracted more students; when the first term ended they had enrolled 80 students in the seminary. The WABHMS made a down payment on a nine-acre (36,000 m^{2}) site in Atlanta relatively close to the church where they began, which originally had five buildings left from a Union Civil War encampment, to support classroom and residence hall needs.

In 1882 the two women returned to Massachusetts to bid for more money and were introduced to businessman John D. Rockefeller who was an industrialist and a Northern Baptist at a church conference in Cleveland, Ohio. Rockefeller was impressed by Packard's vision. In April 1884, Rockefeller visited the school. At the time, the seminary had 600 students and 16 faculty members. The school's existence was enabled by donations from the Black community in Atlanta and the efforts of volunteer teachers.

Rockefeller was so impressed that he settled the debt on the property. His wife, Laura Spelman Rockefeller; her sister, Lucy Spelman; and their parents, Harvey Buel and Lucy Henry Spelman also supported the school. The Spelmans were longtime activists in the abolitionist movement. In 1884 the name of the school was changed to the Spelman Seminary in honor of Laura Spelman Rockefeller and her parents. Rockefeller donated the funds for the oldest building on campus, Rockefeller Hall, which was built in 1886.

Packard was appointed Spelman's first president in 1888, after the charter for the seminary was granted. She died in 1891, and Giles was the president until her own death in 1909. A diploma granting institution in its early years, Spelman awarded its first college degrees in 1901.

=== Growth ===
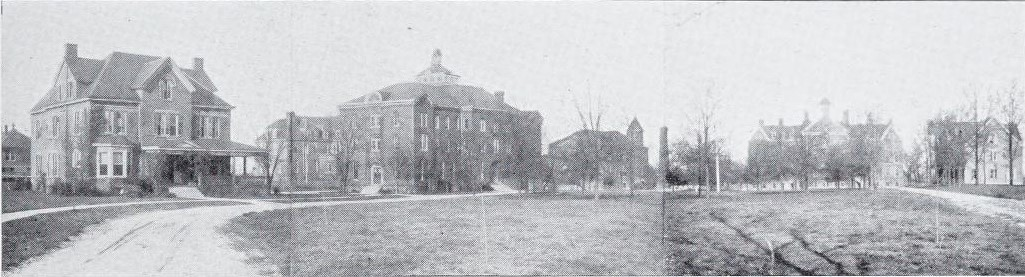
Spelman College c. 1910

From 1910 to 1953 the seminary had a substantial amount of growth and transition. After Giles' death, Lucy Hale Tapley became president. Although the college was somewhat progressive, neither the founders nor the current administration were interested in challenging the status quo of young women as being primarily responsible for the family and the home. Tapley said, "Any course of study which fails to cultivate a taste and fitness for practical and efficient work in some part of the field of the world's needs is unpopular at Spelman and finds no place in our curriculum." The nursing curriculum was strengthened, a teachers' dormitory and a home economics building were constructed; and Tapley Hall, the science building, was completed in 1925. The Granddaughters' Club, a club for students whose mothers and aunts had attended Spelman was created and the club is still in existence today.

In September 1924, Spelman Baptist Seminary officially became Spelman College. Florence Matilda Read became the president in 1927. Soon afterwards, Spelman entered into an "agreement of affiliation" with nearby Morehouse College and Atlanta University by chartering the Atlanta University Center in 1929. Atlanta University would provide graduate education for students; Morehouse and Spelman were responsible for undergraduate education. At a time during which Black students were often denied access to graduate studies at predominantly white southern research universities, access to Atlanta University allowed the undergraduate students at Morehouse and Spelman immediate access to graduate courses.

In 1927, one of the most important buildings on campus, Sisters Chapel, was dedicated. The chapel was named for its primary benefactors, sisters Laura Spelman Rockefeller and Lucy Maria Spelman. The Spelman College Glee Club was founded in 1925, beginning the popular Atlanta tradition of the annual Spelman-Morehouse Christmas Carol Concert. The Atlanta University Summer Theater was staged by the University Players, a drama organization for AUC students. In 1930 the Spelman Nursery School was created as a training center for mothers and a practice arena for students who planned careers in education and child development. Spelman celebrated its 50th anniversary in April 1931. This milestone was accompanied by the construction of a university library that was shared amongst the Atlanta University Center institutions, and the center continues to share a library to this day.

The school continued to expand, building and acquiring more property to accommodate the growing student body. In 1947, Spelman joined the list of "approved institutions" of the Association of American Universities. In 1953, Florence Read retired, and Albert E. Manley became the first Black and first male president of the college. Under his presidency and the presidency of his successor, Donald Stewart, Spelman experienced significant growth. The college established its study abroad program, the Merrill Foreign Travel-Study Program. Stewart's administration tripled the college's endowment and was responsible for the establishment of the Comprehensive Writing Program, an across-the-curriculum writing program which required students to submit portfolios of their written work; the Ethel Waddell Githii College Honors Program, and the Women's Research and Resource Center. In 1958, the college received accreditation from the Southern Association of Colleges and Schools.

=== Civil rights involvement ===
In the 1960s, the Spelman College students became involved in civil rights actions in Atlanta. In 1962, the first Spelman students were arrested for participating in sit-ins in the Atlanta community. American historian Howard Zinn was a professor of history at Spelman during this era and served as an adviser to the Student Nonviolent Coordinating Committee chapter at the college. Zinn mentored many of Spelman's students fighting for civil rights at the time, including Alice Walker and Marian Wright Edelman He was dismissed from the college in 1963 for supporting Spelman students in their efforts to fight segregation; at the time, Spelman was focused on turning out "refined young ladies". Edelman herself writes that Spelman had a reputation as "a tea-pouring, very strict school designed to turn Black girls into refined ladies and teachers".

=== 1980–present ===
Stewart retired in 1986, and the following year, Johnnetta Betsch Cole became the first Black female president of Spelman College. During this time, the college became noted for its commitment to community service and its ties to the local community. Cole also led the college's most successful capital campaign; between 1986 and 1996, the college raised $113.8 million, including a $20 million gift from Bill Cosby and his wife, Camille Hanks Cosby, whose daughter graduated from Spelman. In honor of this gift, the Cosby Academic Center was constructed. In July 2015, the remainder of the funds were returned and an endowed professorship named for the Cosby couple discontinued as allegations of sexual assault by Bill Cosby grew more prominent.

In 1997, Cole stepped down and Audrey Forbes Manley became Spelman's first alumna president. After Manley’s retirement in 2002, Beverly Daniel Tatum served as the college’s president until 2015, when Mary Schmidt Campbell was named the tenth president. The campus now comprises 26 buildings on 39 acres (160,000 m^{2}) in Atlanta. In 2011, First Lady Michelle Obama served as the keynote commencement speaker. The following year, Oprah Winfrey served as the keynote commencement speaker.

In 2015, Spelman opened the Wellness Center at Reed Hall, a state-of-the-art recreation center. It is host to a multitude of services from an indoor track and cycling room to a teaching kitchen and a multitude of fitness and wellness programs. In 2017, Spelman's leadership voted to allow transgender women to enroll. In 2018, Spelman received $30 million from Spelman trustee Ronda Stryker for the construction of a new state-of-the-art building on campus. Two years later, the college received another significant donation: $40 million from philanthropists Reed Hastings and his wife Patty Quillin to be used as scholarship funds for students enrolled at Spelman. In July 2020, Spelman received a large undisclosed donation from philanthropist MacKenzie Scott.

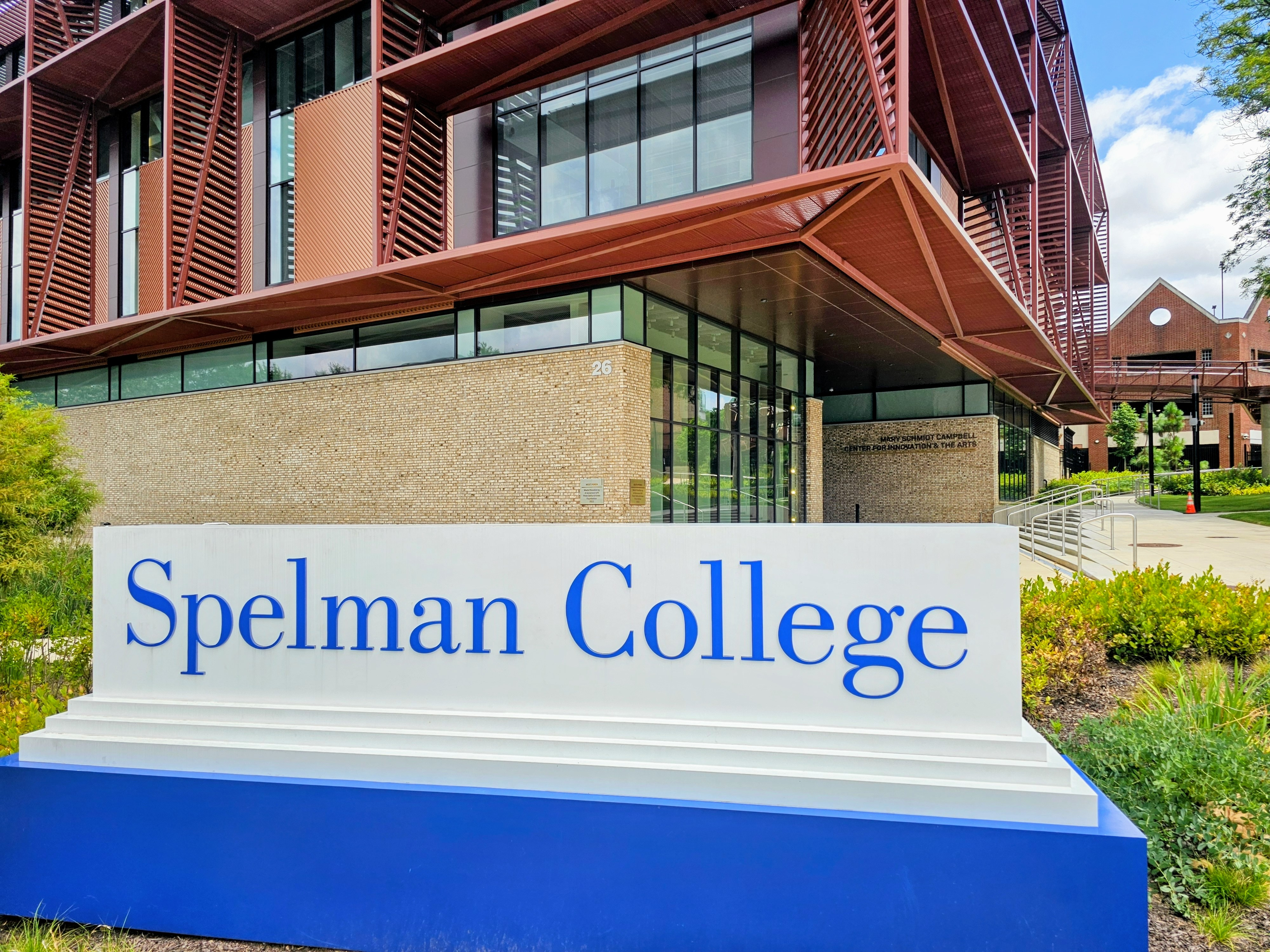
Spelman College sign in 2025

In April 2022, Helene Gayle was named the 11th president of Spelman College. In January 2024, Spelman received the largest single donation in its history and one of the largest ever to a HBCU with $100 million given by Spelman trustee Ronda Stryker and her husband, William Johnston. Spelman stated that $75 million of the $100 million donation will go towards endowed scholarships for future students, and the remaining $25 million will be used to "develop an academic focus on public policy and democracy, improve student housing and provide flexible funding to meet critical strategic needs."

=== Presidents ===
Since its inception, Spelman has had 11 presidents:

- Sophia B. Packard (1888) founded the women's seminary with Giles in a basement of the historic Friendship Baptist Church (Atlanta) and cultivated Rockefeller support for the school
- Harriet E. Giles (1891) under whom the school granted its first college degrees
- Lucy Hale Tapley (1910) under whom the school decided to focus on higher education, the school officially became Spelman College (1927), and Sisters Chapel, one of the main buildings on campus, was erected
- Florence M. Read, (1927) under whom the school established an endowment fund of over $3 million, the school came into agreement with Atlanta University and Morehouse College to form the Atlanta University Center (later Clark-Atlanta University, Morris Brown College, Morehouse School of Medicine, and the Interdenominational Theological Center were added), the Arnett Library was built, and Spelman earned approval from the American Association of Universities
- Albert E. Manley (1953) (the first Black and first male president of Spelman), under whom study abroad programs were established, the fine arts center was built, and three new residence halls and several classroom buildings were renovated. According to Howard Zinn, Manley tried to suppress the student civil rights movement that was taking place on campus during his tenure
- Donald M. Stewart (1976) under whom the departments of women's studies and chemistry were founded, and three strategic programs were formed: the Comprehensive Writing Program, the Women's Research and Resource Center, and the Ethel Waddell Githii Honors Program, and a continuing education department and a computer literacy program were established
- Johnnetta B. Cole (1987) (the first African-American woman president of Spelman), under whom the college received $20 million from Drs. William and Camille Cosby for the construction of the Cosby Academic Center and instituted the Cole Institute for Community Service
- Audrey F. Manley (1997) (the first alumna president of Spelman), under whom Spelman gained a Phi Beta Kappa chapter, Spelman was accepted as a provisional member of NCAA Division III athletics, and the Science Center was finished
- Beverly Daniel Tatum, (2002) under whom renovation of Sisters Chapel began and the Wellness Center was finished
- Mary Schmidt Campbell, (2015) under whom Spelman began its largest comprehensive campaign in the institution's history setting a fundraising goal of $250 million. Also, Spelman's $96 million 84,000-square-foot Center for Innovation & the Arts completed in 2025 is named in honor of Campbell
- Helene Gayle, (2022)

== Museum of Fine Art ==
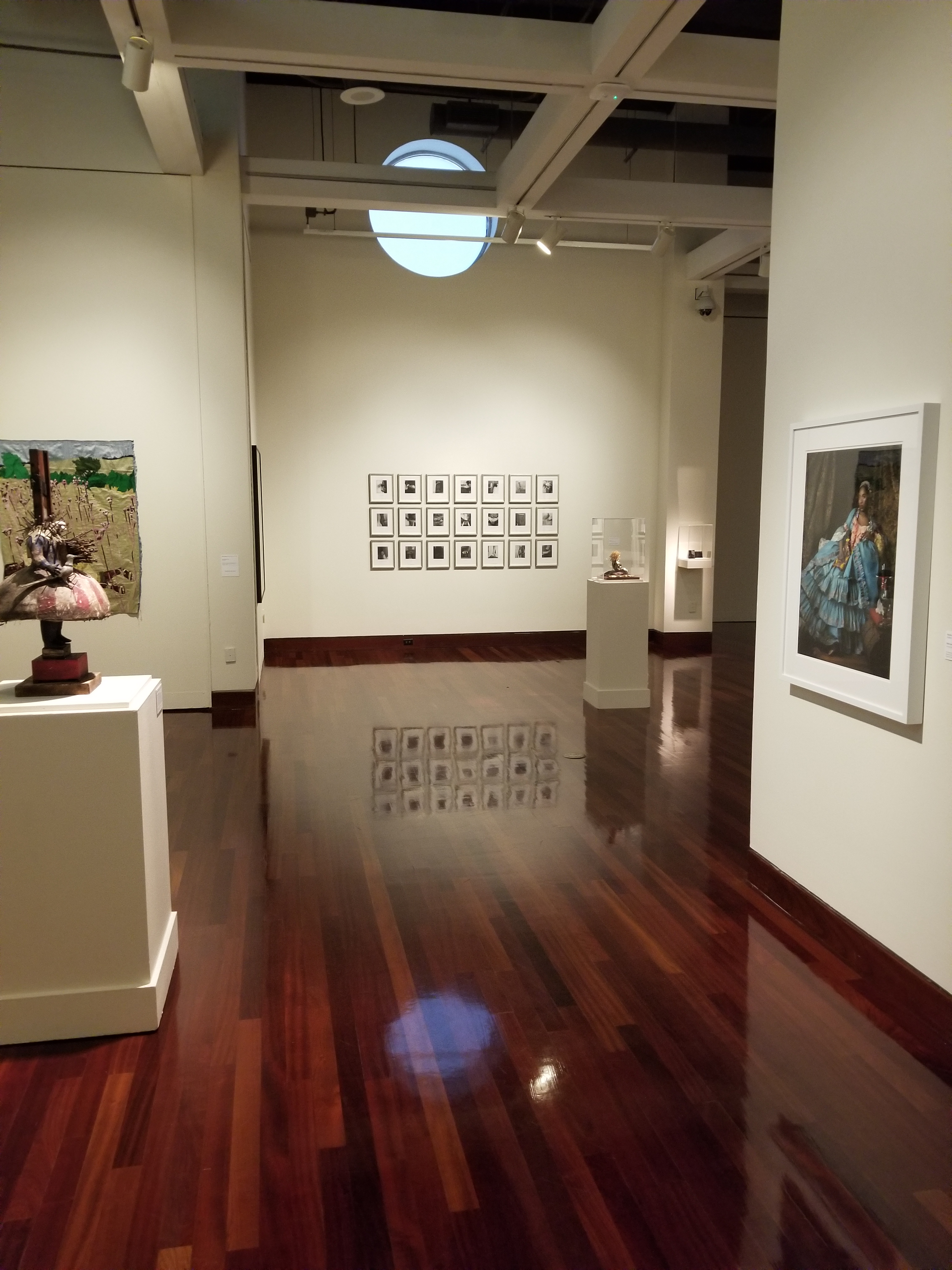
Museum of Fine Art

The Spelman College Museum of Fine Art is the only museum in the United States that emphasizes art by and about women of the African Diaspora. Some Black Women artists the museum has featured include Amy Sherald, Harmonia Rosales, Mickalene Thomas, Beverly Buchanan, Zanele Muholi, and Reneé Stout. Each semester, the museum features a new exhibit.

In 2016, the museum collaborated with Spelman's Department of Art and Art History to start a two-year curatorial studies program to increase diversity in the museum industry.

== Academics ==
Academic rankings

Liberal arts
- U.S. News & World Report: 40 of 211
- Washington Monthly: 95 of 194

National
- WSJ/College Pulse: 126 (tie) of 796

Spelman was ranked tied for 40th of 211 of among national liberal arts colleges and 1st among 79 historically Black colleges in the United States by U.S. News & World Report for 2025; additionally, it tied for 1st in "Social Mobility", tied for 16th for "Most Innovative", tied for 30th for "Best Undergraduate Teaching", and 60th for "Best Value" among liberal arts colleges. Spelman ranked first among baccalaureate origin institutions of African-American women who earned science, engineering, and mathematics doctoral degrees.

The college is accredited by the Commission on Colleges of the Southern Association of Colleges and Schools (SACS). Spelman is a member of the Coalition of Women's Colleges, National Association of Schools of Music (NASM), and The College Fund/UNCF.

Spelman offers bachelor's degrees in over 30 academic majors. In addition, Spelman has partnerships with over 30 universities to help students complete degree programs not offered on campus in healthcare, law, and engineering. Its most popular majors, by number out of 483 graduates in 2022, were:

- Psychology (70)
- Biology/Biological Sciences (69)
- Political Science and Government (50)
- Health Services/Allied Health/Health Sciences (44)
- Economics (42)
- English Language and Literature (35)

The Ethel Waddell Githii Honors Program is a selective academic community available to students who meet the requirements.

=== Honor societies ===
There are several registered academic honor societies on campus.

=== Admissions ===
Spelman is a selective institution with an acceptance rate of 28% for the fall 2022 first-time, first-year class.

== Student body ==
Students are all women and predominantly African-American. Approximately 30% come from Georgia, 69% from the rest of the United States, and 1% are international. 85% of Spelman students receive financial aid; the average financial package for a first year student adds up to $22,000.

== Student life ==
Spelman offers organized and informal activities. Spelman's over 80 student organizations include community service organizations, special interest groups, honors societies, Morehouse cheerleaders, choral groups, music ensembles, dance groups, drama/theater groups, marching band, intramural sports, and student government.

Spelman's gated campus near downtown Atlanta consists of over 25 buildings on 39 acres.

=== New student orientation ===
All new Spelman students are required to attend a six-day new student orientation (NSO) in August immediately before the fall semester begins. NSO includes events, workshops, and sessions designed to teach new Spelmanites about the mission, history, culture, traditions, and sisterhood of Spelman College; students are also given information on how to successfully matriculate to Spelman Women (graduates), such as registration, advisement, placement, and planning class schedules. NSO is led by student orientation leaders known as PALs (Peer Assistant Leaders) and Spelman alumnae. During NSO, new students are required to remain on campus at all times; any leave must be approved by PALs.

=== White attire tradition ===
One of Spelman's oldest traditions is for Spelmanites to wear "respectable and conservative" white attire to designated formal events on campus. The tradition began in the early 1900s when it was customary for women to wear white dresses when attending formal events. White is worn today to several annual events, and graduating seniors wear white clothing underneath their graduation gowns for Class Day and Commencement. In 2009, My Sister's Closet was established on campus by the Student Government Association for alumnae and current students to donate white attire for Spelman students.

=== Student publications and media ===
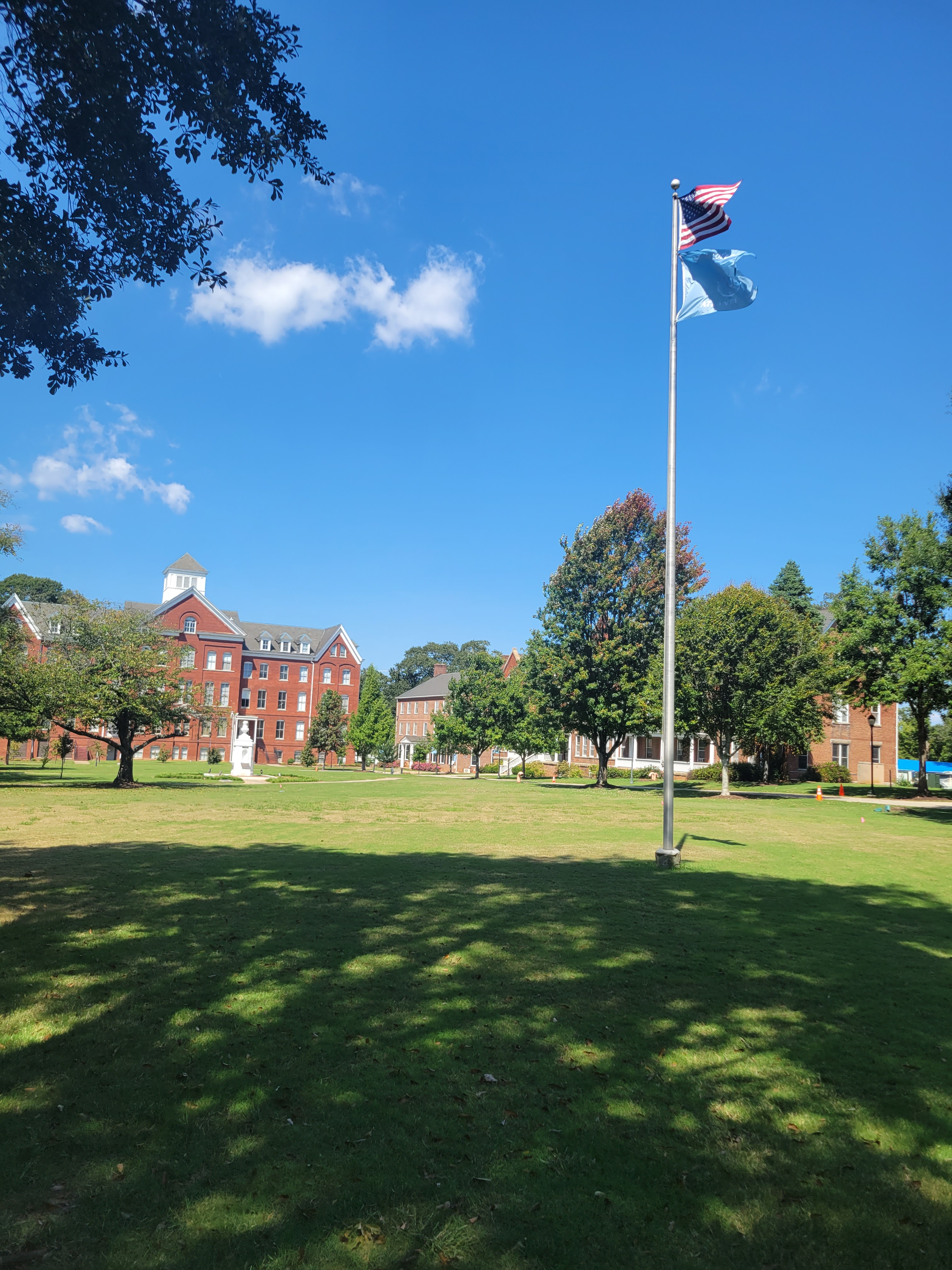
Spelman College campus

Spelman offers a literary magazine (Aunt Chloe: A Journal of Candor), a student newspaper, The BluePrint, and student government association newsletter (Jaguar Print). The yearbook is called Reflections.

=== Religious organizations ===
Religious organizations currently registered on campus include Baha'i Club, Al-Nissa, Alabaster Box, Atlanta Adventist Collegiate Society, Campus Crusade for Christ, Crossfire International Campus Ministry, Happiness In Praise for His Overflowing Presence, InterVarsity Christian Fellowship, Movements of Praise Dance Team, The Newman Organization, The Outlet and The Pre-Theology Society Minority.

=== International student and social organizations ===
NAACP and Sister Steps are registered campus organizations. Spelman also has chapters of Colleges Against Cancer, Circle K, Feminist Majority Leadership Alliance, Habitat for Humanity, National Council of Negro Women, National Society of Black Engineers, Operation Smile, United Way, and Young Democrats of America. Spelman is also the first HBCU to charter a chapter of Amnesty International on its campus.

Spelman's 2005 robotics team, the SpelBots, became the first all women, all black robotics team to compete in the RoboCup Four-Legged League Soccer competition. The team tied for first place in the 2009 RoboCup humanoid soccer championship in Osaka, Japan.

Spelman has several sororities on campus including all four of the National Pan-Hellenic Council. About three percent of students are active in Spelman's Greek system.

=== Residential life ===
Spelman College has eleven residence halls on campus with approximately 1,500 students occupying them. All first-year students are required to live on campus.

== Athletics ==
The Spelman athletic teams were called the Jaguars. The college was a member of the Division III ranks of the National Collegiate Athletic Association (NCAA), primarily competing in the Great South Athletic Conference (GSAC) from 2003–04 to 2012–13.

Spelman competed in seven intercollegiate varsity sports: Women's sports included basketball, cross country, golf, soccer, softball, tennis and volleyball.

=== Discontinuation ===
In 2013, Spelman College decided to drop varsity athletics and leave the NCAA. Using money originally budgeted to the sports programs, they created wellness programs available for all students.

== Notable alumnae and faculty ==
Spelman's notable alumnae include:

- Rosalind Brewer, the first African-American CEO of Sam's Club and Walgreens
- Pulitzer Prize-winner Alice Walker
- Former dean of Harvard College Evelynn M. Hammonds
- Activist and Children's Defense Fund founder Marian Wright Edelman
- Civil rights and criminal defense lawyer Dovey Johnson Roundtree
- College organist Joyce Johnson
- Musician, activist and historian Bernice Johnson Reagon
- Politician Stacey Abrams
- Writer Pearl Cleage
- TV personality Rolonda Watts
- Opera singer Mattiwilda Dobbs
- Actresses Cassi Davis, LaTanya Richardson, Adrienne-Joi Johnson, Keshia Knight Pulliam, and Tati Gabrielle
- Assemblywoman of the 18th district of New York State Taylor Darling
- Designor and curator Sara Penn
- Lisa D. Cook, member of the Federal Reserve Board of Governors
- Pamela Gunter-Smith, the first African-American president of York College of Pennsylvania
- Kim Davis, the Executive Vice President of Social Impact, Growth Initiatives & Legislative Affairs for the National Hockey League
