= List of Spelman College people =

List of notable people associated with Spelman College

The list of Spelman College people includes notable alumnae and faculty of Spelman College.

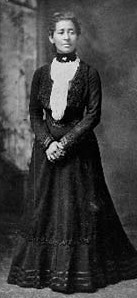
Selena Sloan Butler

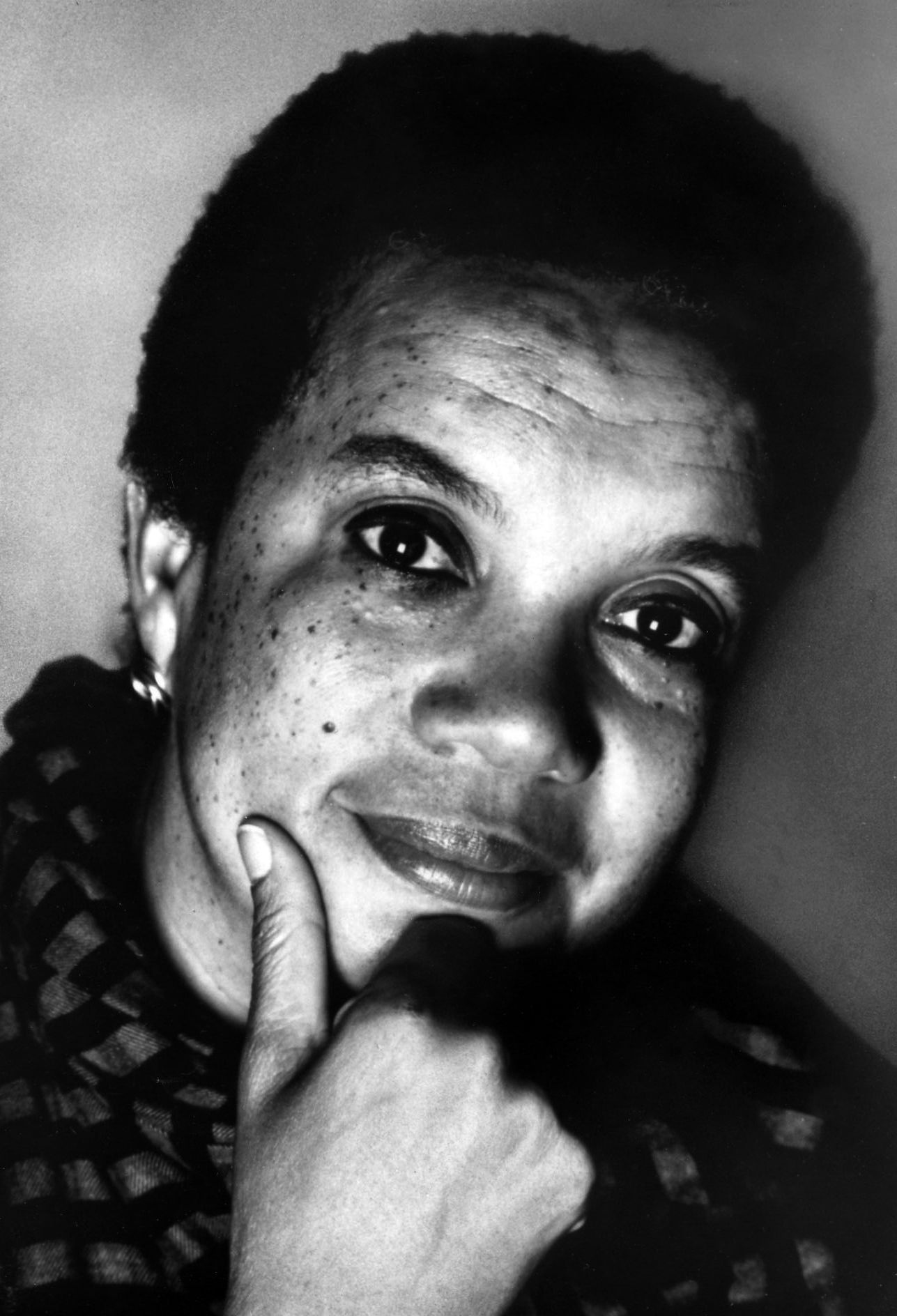
Marian Wright Edelman, founder of Children's Defense Fund, MacArthur Fellow

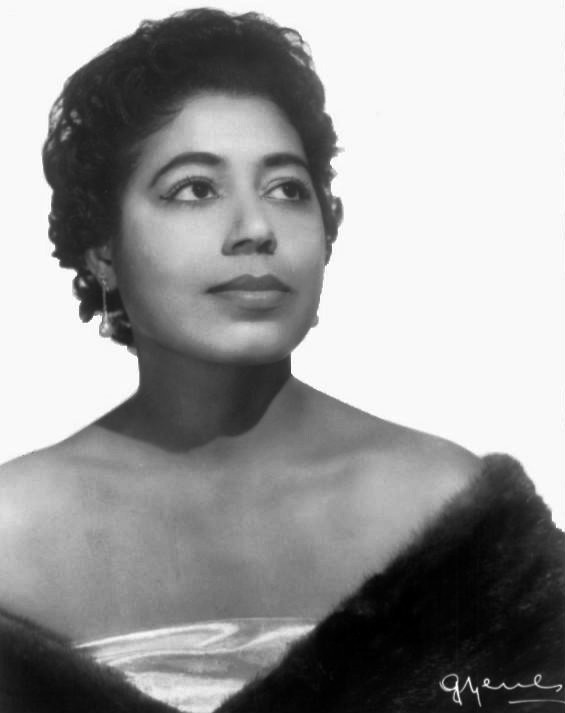
Opera singer Mattiwilda Dobbs

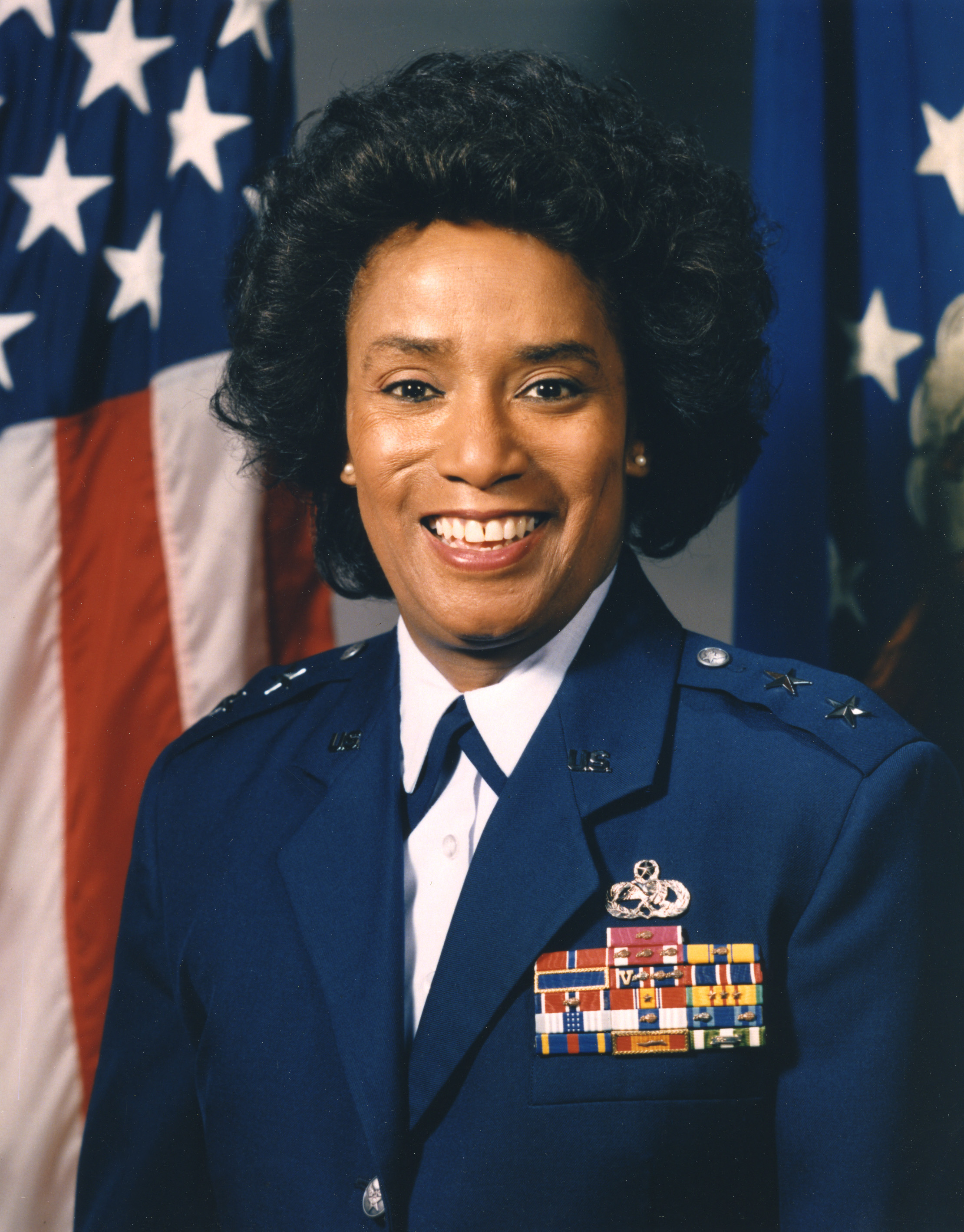
U.S. Air Force photo of Marcelite J. Harris

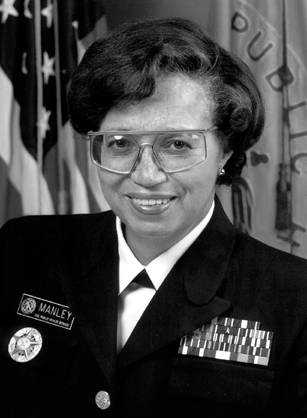
Audrey F. Manley, former surgeon general of the US

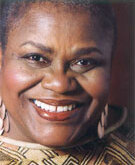
Bernice Johnson Reagon

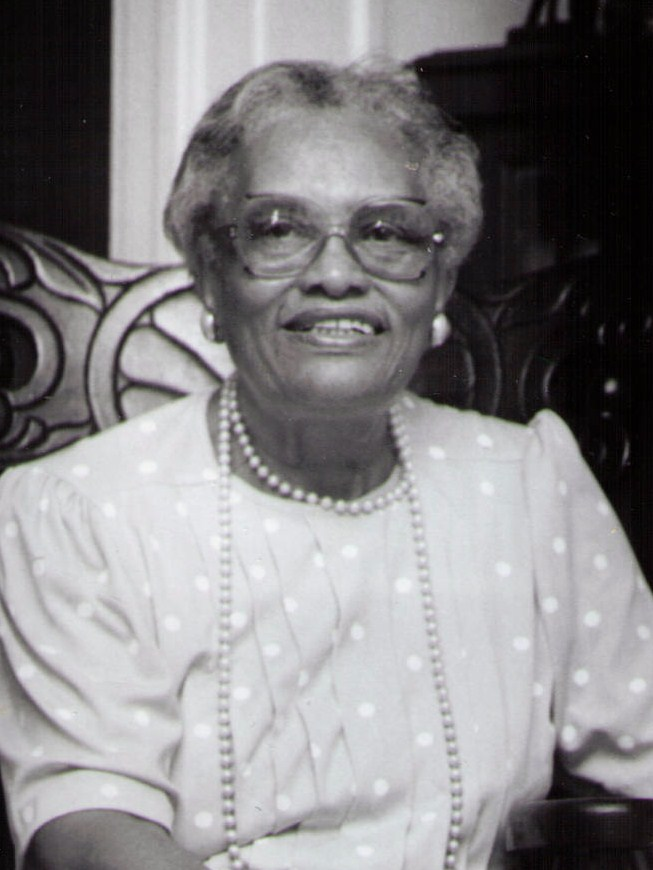
Dovey Johnson Roundtree

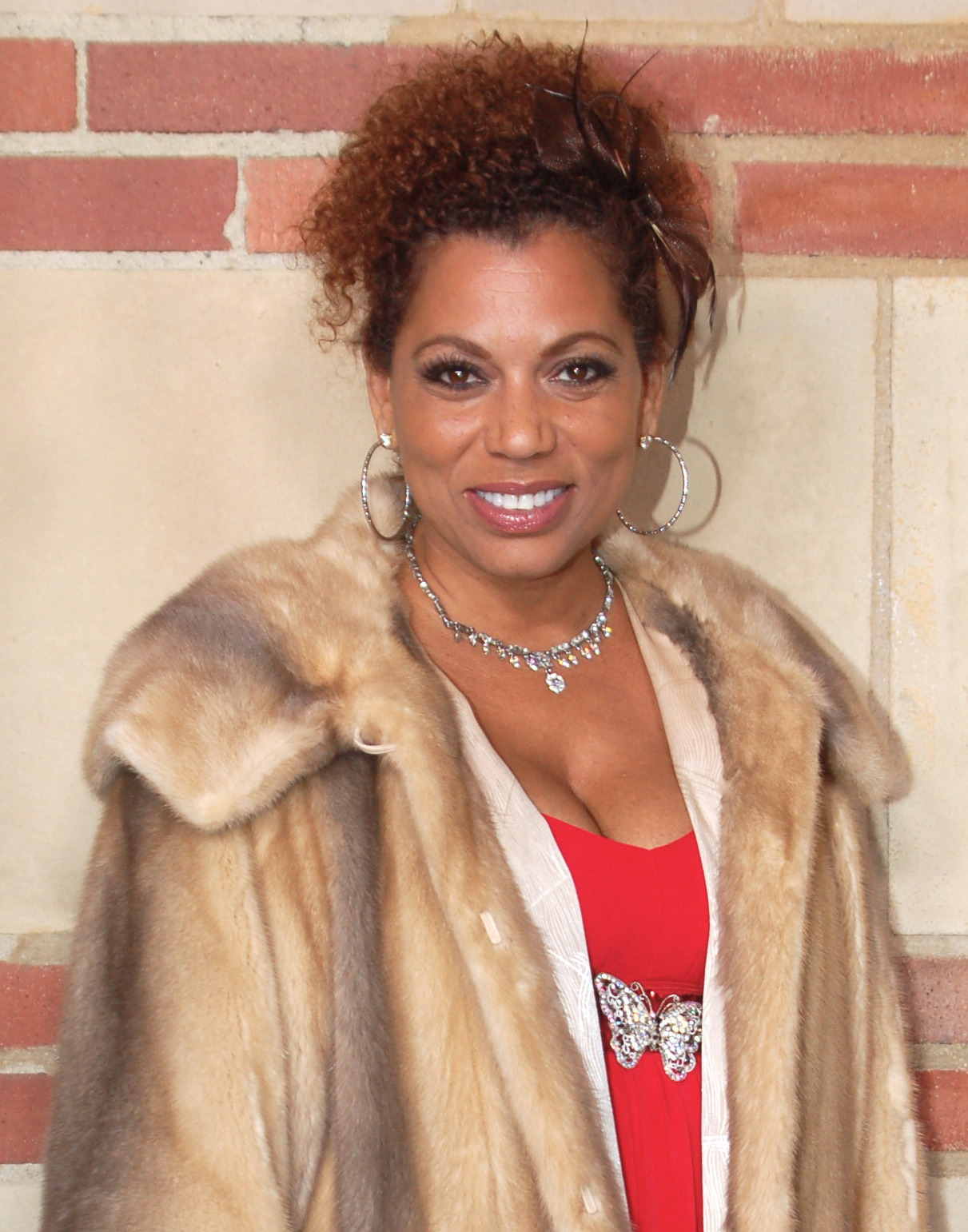
Rolonda Watts

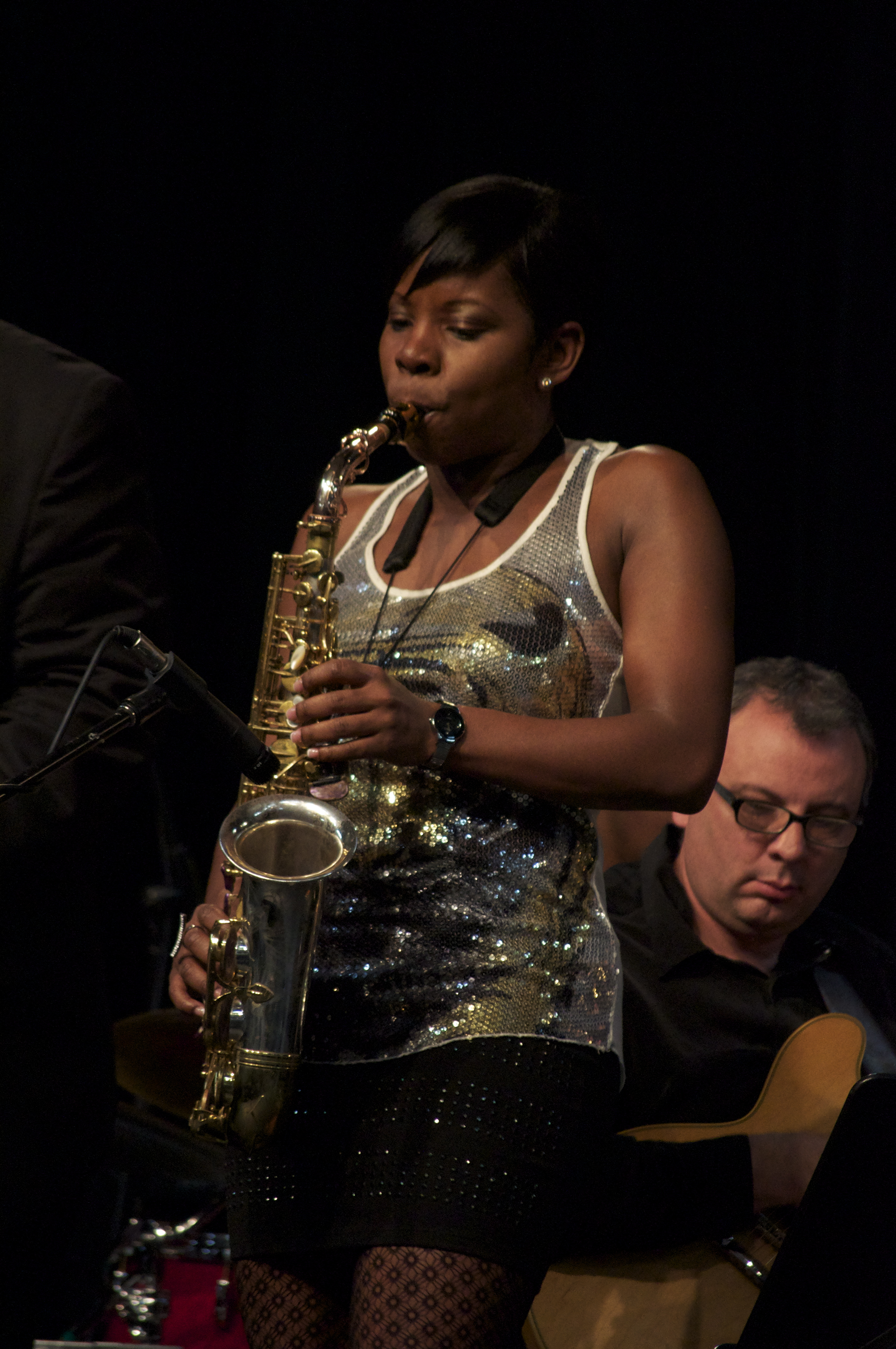
Tia Fuller

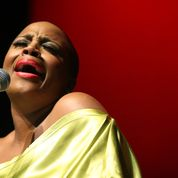
Avery Sunshine

== Notable alumnae ==
Name	Class year	Notability	Reference(s)
Stacey Abrams	1995	Politician, House minority leader for the Georgia General Assembly and state representative for the 89th House District; first African-American woman in the U.S. to win a major party's nomination for governor	
Adrienne Adams	1982	First African-American speaker of the New York City Council	
Erika Anderson	2012	Engineer, noted advocate for women of color in STEM	
Tina McElroy Ansa	1971	Author, Baby of the Family, Ugly Ways, The Hand I Fan With, and You Know Better	
Blanche Armwood	1906	Educator, activist; first African-American woman in the state of Florida to graduate from an accredited law school; Armwood High School in Tampa, FL is named in her honor	
AverySunshine	1998	Singer and pianist	
Brenda S. Banks	1971	Archivist, deputy director of the Georgia Department of Archives and History and founder of Banks Archives Consultants	
Mary Barksdale	1942	Past president, Jack and Jill	
Ruha Benjamin	2001	Alexander Stewart 1886 Professor of African American Studies, Princeton University, MacArthur Fellow (2024)	
Loretta Copeland Biggs	1976	Judge of the United States District Court for the Middle District of North Carolina	
Janet Bragg	1931	Aviation pioneer; first African-American woman to obtain a commercial pilot license	
Rosalind G. Brewer	1984	Chief executive officer, Walgreens; chief operating officer, Starbucks; executive vice president, Walmart Stores, Inc. and president of Walmart Stores South, USA; board of directors, Lockheed Martin	
Ada E. Brown	1996	First African-American female federal judge in the United States District Court for the Northern District of Texas	
Linda Goode Bryant	1981	Documentary filmmaker, Flag Wars; Peabody Award winner and 2004 Guggenheim Fellow	
Selena Sloan Butler	1888	Founder of first Black parent-teacher organization, the National Congress for Colored Parents & Teachers; co-founder of the National Parent-Teacher Association	
June Dobbs Butts	1948	Educator and writer	
Sheila L. Chamberlain	1981	Pilot, lawyer	
Pearl Cleage	1971	Novelist, playwright, poet, essayist, and journalist	
Lisa Cook	1986	First African-American woman to be confirmed as a Federal Reserve governor	
Taylor Darling	2004	Elected official from the 18th district of the New York State Assembly	
Cassi Davis	1988	Actress, House of Payne	
Ethel McGhee Davis	1919	Student adviser and dean of women at Spelman College	
Kim Davis	1981	The Executive Vice President of Social Impact, Growth Initiatives & Legislative Affairs for the National Hockey League	
Ruth A. Davis	1966	First and to date only African-American woman to reach the personal rank of career ambassador (the highest rank within the U.S. Foreign Service and equivalent to four-star general in the military); 24th director general of the United States Foreign Service; director, Foreign Service Institute; and two-time recipient of the President's Award for Distinguished Federal Civilian Service	
Phire Dawson	2008	"Barker's Beauty" on The Price Is Right	
Mattiwilda Dobbs	1937	Opera singer; served on the board of directors of the Metropolitan Opera and the National Endowment for the Arts	
Marian Wright Edelman	1960	Founder of the Children's Defense Fund; MacArthur Fellow; Heinz Award; Presidential Medal of Freedom	
Christine King Farris	1948	Public speaker and educator who taught at Spelman College, eldest and last living sibling of the late Rev. Martin Luther King Jr.	
Eleanor Ison Franklin	1948	Medical physiologist and endocrinologist	
Tia Fuller	1998	Saxophonist, composer, and educator	
Nora A. Gordon	1888	Began the tradition of Spelman missionary work to Africa	
Beverly Guy-Sheftall	1966	Author, feminist scholar, founder of Women's Research and Resource Center at Spelman College	
Evelynn M. Hammonds	1976	Dean of Harvard College, professor of the History of Science and of African and African American Studies at Harvard University	
Marcelite J. Harris	1964	First African-American woman to obtain the rank of general in the United States Air Force	
Paula Hicks-Hudson	1973	First African-American female mayor of Toledo, Ohio	
Pamela Gunter-Smith	1973	First African-American president of York College of Pennsylvania	
Varnette Honeywood	1972	Creator of the Little Bill character	
Clara Ann Howard	1887	Baptist missionary in Africa, longtime Spelman staff	
Alexine Clement Jackson	1956	Chair, Susan G. Komen for the Cure and former national president of the YWCA	
Adrienne-Joi Johnson	1988	Actress, House Party, Baby Boy	
Bernette Joshua Johnson	1964	First African-American and second female chief justice of the Louisiana Supreme Court	
Clara Stanton Jones	1934	First African-American president of the American Library Association	
Tayari Jones	1991	Award-winning author of An American Marriage and English professor at Emory University	
Bettina Judd	2005	Artist and poet	
Annie Brown Kennedy	1945	Politician and lawyer; first Black woman to serve in the North Carolina House of Representatives	
Alberta Williams King	(high school)	Mother of Martin Luther King Jr.	
Bernice King	1986	President, SCLC, daughter of Martin Luther King Jr.	
Audrey F. Manley	1955	President emerita of Spelman College, former assistant surgeon general of the United States, former acting surgeon general of the United States	
Marian Mereba	2011	Singer, songwriter, and producer	
Harriet Mitchell Murphy	1949	First African-American female judge in Texas	
Tanya Walton Pratt	1981	Judge, United States District Court for the Southern District of Indiana	
Deborah Prothrow-Stith	1975	First female commissioner of Public Health for the Commonwealth of Massachusetts; associate dean for Faculty Development and professor at Harvard School of Public Health	
Keshia Knight Pulliam	2001	Actress, The Cosby Show, House of Payne	
Reisha Raney		CEO of Encyde Corporation and first Black woman to serve as a Maryland state officer in the Daughters of the American Revolution	
Tanika Ray	1994	Actress and television personality	
Bernice Johnson Reagon	1970	Founding member of The Freedom Singers at Albany State College; founder of Sweet Honey in the Rock; MacArthur Fellow; professor emeritus at American University, curator emeritus at Smithsonian Institution, National Museum of American History; National Humanities Medal, Heinz Award	
LaTanya Richardson	1971	Actress (The Fighting Temptations, Losing Isaiah, Malcolm X) and wife of actor Samuel L. Jackson	
Ruby Robinson	1963	Civil rights activist, executive secretary of SNCC	
Shaun Robinson	1984	Co-anchor, Access Hollywood; former host, TV One Access	
Esther Rolle	attended	Actress, Good Times	
Dovey Johnson Roundtree	1938	Trial attorney, military veteran, AMEC minister, and civil rights pioneer; landmark case: Sarah Keys v. Carolina Coach Company	
Eva Rutland	1937	Author, When We Were Colored: A Mother's Story; winner of the 2000 Golden Pen Lifetime Achievement Award, and author of more than 20 romance novels	
Kiron Skinner	1981	College professor and former director of Policy Planning at the United States Department of State	
Brenda V. Smith	1980	Law professor, American University; appointed by Nancy Pelosi to the National Prison Rape Elimination Commission	
Daphne L. Smith	1980	First African-American woman to earn a Ph.D. in mathematics from MIT	
Maxine Smith	1949	Academic, civil rights activist, and school board official	
Hemlocke Springs	2021	Singer, songwriter, and producer	
Sharmell Sullivan	1990	Miss Black America 1991, "TNA Knockout", and wife of professional wrestler Booker T	
Sue Bailey Thurman	1920	Founder and first chairperson, National Council of Negro Women's National Library	
Alice Walker	attended	Pulitzer Prize-winning novelist, The Color Purple	
Talitha Washington	1996	African-American mathematician and STEM activist	
Rolonda Watts	1980	Journalist, actor, writer, former talk show host	
Ella Gaines Yates	1949	First African-American director of the Atlanta-Fulton Public Library System	

== Notable faculty ==
- Alma Jean Billingslea (born 1946), civil rights activist and author
- Sylvia Bozeman (born 1947), mathematician and educator
- Ayoka Chenzira (born 1953), director, producer, writer, and animator
- Pearl Cleage (born 1948), author
- Jelani Cobb (born 1969), writer, author, educator
- Julie Dash (born 1952), filmmaker
- Etta Zuber Falconer (1933–2002), educator and mathematician
- Christine King Farris (born 1927), author, sister of Martin Luther King Jr.
- Shirley Franklin (born 1945), former Atlanta mayor
- Cornelia Gillyard (born 1941), chair of the chemistry department
- Beverly Guy-Sheftall (born 1946), black feminist scholar
- Marionette Holmes, economist
- Joyce Johnson (born Joyce Finch), concert pianist and college organist
- Sophia B. Jones (1857–1932), first African-American faculty member, organized nursing program
- Shirley McBay (born 1935), founder of the Quality Education for Minorities (QEM) Network
- LaVon Mercer (born 1959), American-Israeli basketball player
- Opal J. Moore (born 1953), educator and poet
- Glenda Price, former president of Marygrove College
- Angelino Viceisza, economist
- Gloria Wade-Gayles, author, professor of comparative women's studies
- Howard Zinn (1922–2010), historian
