= Association of Independent Colleges and Universities of Pennsylvania =

The Association of Independent Colleges and Universities of Pennsylvania (AICUP) is a nonprofit 501(c)(3) located in Harrisburg. It is an organization of independent nonprofit colleges and universities (in contrast to State and State-Related schools). Founded in 1995 through the affiliation of three existing educational organizations, it is made up of 85 independent higher education institutions.

AICUP staff meet with policymakers, help coordinate the joint activities of independent colleges, and advise members of legislative and regulatory developments with potential impacts on their institutions. Pennsylvania Senate and House legislators have asked AICUP to give official testimony at the State Capitol multiple times on issues concerning higher education. The organization hosts annual student advocacy days at the Pennsylvania State Capitol that attract hundreds of students from across the state.

280,000 students attend the 85 AICUP member colleges, representing 52% of all four-year degree-seekers in the state. A study published by NPR and PBS in 2024 found that Pennsylvania is the second-most-popular destination in the USA for out-of-state students (attracting more net freshman college students than more populous states like California and Texas), and 2 in 3 of those out-of-state students in PA attend an AICUP member college.

Each year, AICUP confers prestigious awards recognizing outstanding service in higher education. Past AICUP award recipients include Dr. Pamela Gunter-Smith of York College (2024), Curtis H. Barnette of Lehigh University (2023), and Rev. Joseph A. Panuska of the University of Scranton (2001). AICUP collaborates with multiple peer organizations nationwide on legislative action, including the National Association of Independent Colleges and Universities.

== Members ==
- Albright College
- Allegheny College
- Alvernia University
- Arcadia University
- Bryn Athyn College
- Bryn Mawr College
- Bucknell University
- Cairn University
- Carlow University
- Carnegie Mellon University
- Cedar Crest College
- Chatham University
- Chestnut Hill College
- Delaware Valley University
- DeSales University
- Dickinson College
- Drexel University
- Duquesne University
- Eastern University (United States)
- Elizabethtown College
- Franklin & Marshall College
- Gannon University
- Geisinger Commonwealth School of Medicine
- Geneva College
- Gettysburg College
- Grove City College
- Gwynedd Mercy University
- Harcum College
- Harrisburg University of Science and Technology
- Haverford College
- Holy Family University
- Immaculata University
- Johnson College
- Juniata College
- Keystone College
- King's College (Pennsylvania)
- La Roche University
- La Salle University
- Lackawanna College
- Lafayette College
- Lake Erie College of Osteopathic Medicine
- Lancaster Bible College
- Lebanon Valley College
- Lehigh University
- Lycoming College
- Manor College
- Marywood University
- Mercyhurst University
- Messiah University
- Misericordia University
- Moore College of Art and Design
- Moravian University
- Mount Aloysius College
- Muhlenberg College
- Neumann University
- Peirce College
- Pennsylvania College of Art and Design
- Pennsylvania Institute of Technology
- Philadelphia College of Osteopathic Medicine
- Point Park University
- Robert Morris University
- Rosemont College
- Saint Francis University
- Saint Joseph's University
- Saint Vincent College
- Seton Hill University
- Susquehanna University
- Swarthmore College
- Thiel College
- Thomas Jefferson University
- University of Pennsylvania
- University of Scranton
- Ursinus College
- Valley Forge Military Academy and College
- Villanova University
- Washington & Jefferson College
- Waynesburg University
- Westminster College (Pennsylvania)
- Widener University
- Wilkes University
- Wilmington University (Delaware)
- Wilson College (Pennsylvania)
- Wistar Institute
- York College of Pennsylvania
