= York Country Day School =

Private school in York Pennsylvania, US

Location
- 1000 Indian Rock Dam Road; York, PA 17403
- 39.9406°N 76.7427°W

Information
- School type: Independent, Primary & Secondary
- Head of school: Christine Heine, Ed.D.
- Grades: Preschool through 12th
- Colors: Red, Grey, and White
- Mascot: Greyhounds
- Accreditation: Middle States Association of Schools and Colleges
- Website: York Country Day School

York Country Day School is a progressive Preschool through Grade 12 independent school located in York, Pennsylvania. It is an affiliate of York College of Pennsylvania.

== Headmasters of York Country Day School ==
- Kenneth Snyder (1953–1969)
- John Colbaugh (1969–1973)
- Timothy Bray (1973–1975)
- David L. Seavey (1975–1977)
- John Polhemus (1978–1983)
- Brian P. O'Neil (1983–1985)
- Gilbert Smith (1985–1988)
- Taylor A. Smith (1988–2000)
- Dean Cheesebrough (2000–2001)
- Daniel J. Rocha (2001–2004)
- Robert Shanner (2004–2007)
- Nathaniel Coffman (2007–2014)
- Christine Heine (2014–2025)
- Douglas Key (2025–Present)
