= Curtis H. Barnette =

American lawyer

Curtis H. "Hank" Barnette (born in 1935) is a lawyer, businessman, educator, philanthropist, and chairman emeritus of Bethlehem Steel Corporation.

== Early life ==
He was born in St. Albans, West Virginia, and lived there on the Barnette Family Farm at Lower Falls on the Coal River. He attended public schools in St. Albans and graduated from St. Albans High School in 1952.

== Education ==
He attended West Virginia University, Morgantown, West Virginia in 1952 on a Benedum Scholarship, studying political science and history, graduating with high honors in 1956. While at the university he served as president of the student body, was a member of Phi Beta Kappa, Phi Alpha Theta and Beta Theta Pi.

In 1956 he was awarded a Fulbright Scholarship and as a Fulbright Scholar studied international law at the University of Manchester, Manchester, England, which he completed in 1957 and then entered military service.

He started at Yale Law School in 1959, graduated in 1962, while a student served as a research assistant, director of Moot Court, and after graduation until 1966 was a law tutor at the law school. In 1975–1976, while employed by Bethlehem Steel Corporation, he attended Harvard Business School's Advanced Management Program.

== Military service ==
He was a member of the ROTC at West Virginia University, in his senior year was cadet colonel of the Cadet Corps, graduated as a Distinguished Military Graduate and was commissioned as an officer in the United States Army Reserve – Army Intelligence. He served in Germany 1957–1959 as a counterintelligence officer, and while in Germany was a lecturer in international relations at the Frankfurt Branch of the University of Maryland. He continued Intelligence Reserve duty until 1967 with a Strategic Intelligence Detachment in Connecticut, and was promoted to the rank of major and commanding officer.

== Legal ==
After graduation from Yale Law School in 1962, he worked as an attorney with the New Haven law firm of Wiggin & Dana until 1967 when he joined the law department of Bethlehem Steel Corporation in Pennsylvania, as an attorney. He advanced to general attorney, corporate secretary, assistant general counsel, general counsel, and in 1976, senior vice president and director. In 1992 he was elected chairman and chief executive officer.

His legal work at Bethlehem Steel centered on antitrust, corporate, litigation, labor relations, and international trade. He was elected to the Antitrust Council of the American Bar Association and became a member of and president of the association of general counsel, and continues as an emeritus member.

As secretary he was active in corporate matters, became a member and chairman of the American Society of Corporate Secretaries, and the legal advisory committee of the New York Stock Exchange.

In 2000, after retirement from Bethlehem Steel Corporation, he became of counsel to the international law firm of Skadden, Arps, Slate, Meagher & Flom, with an office in Washington, D.C. He worked, and has written and spoken in the areas of corporate, litigation, international trade, government affairs, and corporate governance, testified before Congressional Committees, and retired in 2011.

He is a Life Member of the American Law Institute, a Life Patron Fellow of the American Bar Foundation and a Life Fellow of the Pennsylvania Bar Foundation.

He is admitted to practice law in the states of Connecticut, Pennsylvania, West Virginia, the District of Columbia, the Supreme Court of the United States and other federal courts.

== Bethlehem Steel Corporation and Business Career ==
He joined Bethlehem Steel Corporation in 1967 and served principally in a legal capacity until 1992, when he was elected chairman and chief executive officer. He served until his retirement in 2000 when he was elected chairman emeritus.

He was a director and chairman of the International Iron and Steel Institute, Brussels, Belgium, and was a director and chairman of the American Iron and Steel Institute, Washington, D.C. He was a member of the Business Council, the Business Roundtable, and was chairman of the Pennsylvania Business Roundtable.

He was a director of Bethlehem Steel, MetLife, the Metropolitan Life Insurance Company, Owens Corning, and a member of the Norfolk Southern Advisory Board.

== Public service ==
President Ronald Reagan appointed him to the Council of the Administrative Conference of the United States, and Secretary Dole named him to the Coal Commission. President George W. Bush appointed him to the President's Trade Advisory Committee for Trade Policy (ACPTN), and he was reappointed by President William Clinton. Governor Richard Thornburg appointed him to a Judicial Advisory Selection Committee, and Governor Tom Ridge named him to the 21st Century Environmental Commission. He was elected as a director of the National Center for State Courts in Williamsburg, Virginia, and was named to the Independent Review Commission on Doping Control by U.S. Track and Field, U.S. Olympic Committee. He has been appointed by the mayor of the City of Bethlehem to the Bethlehem World Heritage Commission to help Bethlehem achieve World Heritage status.

== Higher education and conservation ==
Barnette served as chairman of the West Virginia University board of governors, and upon retirement was named chairman emeritus. He was chairman and a director of the West Virginia University Foundation, and upon retirement was elected director emeritus.

He is a member and served as chairman of the Yale Law School Fund Board, was a trustee of Lehigh University, and is a trustee of Moravian University.

Barnette and his wife, Joanne, have established student scholarships including those at West Virginia University, Yale Law School, Moravian University, Lehigh University, DeSales University, the University of Charleston, St. Luke's University Health Network and Manchester University, and have provided other contributions and support to those and other schools. They have been long time members of the Tocqueville Society of the United Way and supported various other charitable organizations.

Barnette grew up on the Barnette Family Farm in St. Albans, WV, which was donated to the State of West Virginia and the Coal River Group. It is now the Barnette Landing on the Coal River, and the Barnette Conservation Preserve.

Joanne was raised on the Harner Family Farm in Morgantown, West Virginia, which she and Barnette donated to West Virginia University to be used and developed for faculty and staff housing.

He was CEO of Bethlehem Steel when decisions were made to end steel operations at the Bethlehem Plant on the 1800-acre tract of land in South Bethlehem, Pennsylvania. Barnette was a leader, along with others, through public-private efforts, to cause the preservation of the Bethlehem Plant Site as the largest Brownfield Redevelopment in America. After planning, rezoning, infrastructure construction, and environmental assessments, Beth Works (200 acres) and Bethlehem Commerce Center (1600 acres) were established and continue to be developed.

== Current ==
He continues the private practice of law, serves as a director of Lehigh Valley Industrial Park, vice chair of the Bethlehem World Heritage Commission, Rotary Club of Bethlehem, chair emeritus of the National Museum of Industrial History, trustee of Moravian University, an emeritus member of the Association of General Counsel, member of the Yale Law School Fund Board, and the Council of Chief Executives.

Barnette has received the Lifetime Achievement Award from the Association of Fundraising Professionals; awarded The Presidential Medal by Moravian College; named a Sterling Fellow by Yale University; received the Lifetime Achievement Award from Marquis Who's Who; and donated his papers, speeches, testimony and related documents to the Distinguished West Virginians Archives.

Sources: AFP Eastern PA, Lifetime Achievement Award, November 15, 2018; Moravian.edu; The Presidential Medal.Curtis H. Barnette-9/18/19; Lifetime Achievement Award -2018-Marquis Who's Who-24.7. press release.com- Marquis Who's Who-Curtis “Hank”Barnette; WVU Launches Distinguished West Virginians Archives-June 5; 2018-wvutoday.wvu.edu.

== Family ==
His wife is Loris Joan Harner ("Joanne") Barnette, and they have two sons, Kevin Barnette and James Barnette.

== Other awards and recognition ==
- Robert P. Casey Medal for Distinguished Achievement from the Association of Independent Colleges and Universities of Pennsylvania (AICUP)
- Honorary Doctor of Law degrees, LL.D.
  - DeSales University
  - Lehigh University
  - Moravian College
  - University of Charleston
  - West Virginia University
- American Iron and Steel Institute, Washington, D.C.
  - The Gary Memorial Medal
  - The Statesman Award
- International Iron and Steel Institute (World Steel Organization), Brussels, Belgium
  - The IISI Medal
- City of Bethlehem, PA
  - Hall of Fame, 275th Anniversary
- City of St. Albans, WV
  - Hall of Fame Award
- Corporate Board Member Magazine
  - Lifetime Achievement Award as General Counsel
- National Center for State Courts, Williamsburg, VA
  - The Warren Burger Society
  - The John H. Pickering Award
- Chamber of Commerce, Bethlehem, PA
  - Distinguished Community Leadership Award, 1999
- Governor of West Virginia
  - Named a Distinguished West Virginian Award
- Boy Scouts of America, Minsi Trails Council
  - Distinguished Citizen Award, 1996
  - Silver Beaver Award, 2011
- West Virginia University
  - Order of Vandalia
  - Academy of Distinguished Alumni
  - West Virginia Business Hall of Fame
  - Most Loyal Alumni Mountaineer
  - Outstanding Volunteer Philanthropist
- Wildlands Conservancy
  - Friend of the Lehigh River Award
- Pennsylvania Society
  - Councilor Emeritus
- Association of Fundraising Professionals
  - Outstanding Philanthropist, 2004
