= Pamela Gunter-Smith =

Pamela Gunter-Smith is the first African American and the first woman president of York College of Pennsylvania. She has served in administrative appointments at Spelman College and Drew University. She is an advocate for inclusion of women and historically underrepresented people in research.

== Education ==
Pamela Gunter-Smith was born in Nashville, Tennessee in 1951. She was born into a family of scientists as her grandfather, William Gunter, was the diener of anatomy labs at Vanderbilt University School of Medicine for decades. “My mother was a trailblazer – she was the first woman of color to receive a doctorate in her field from her institution. From her I learned how to navigate both a career and family,” Gunter-Smith said.

Gunter-Smith earned a bachelor's degree in biology from Spelman College in 1973 and a Ph.D. in physiology from Emory University in 1978 with the dissertation "The Effect of Theophylline on the transepithelial electrical parameters of amphiuma small intestine." She engaged in post-doctoral research at the University of Pittsburgh School of Medicine and the University of Texas-Houston Medical School.

== Career ==
In 1981, she started as a research scientist at the Armed Forces Radiobiology Research Institute (AFRRI) in Bethesda, Maryland where she worked for twelve years. At this same time, she held academic appointments at George Washington University and the Uniformed Services University of Health Science from 1982 to 1992.

She was appointed Chair of the Biology Department and Associate Provost for science and math at Spelman College in 1992. During this time she increased the number of research grants awarded to the institution and directed the Howard Hughes Medical Institute Biomedical Program at Spelman. She expanded fundraising and the development of institutional grants from both private foundations and federal agencies, which increased the opportunities for both faculty and students to engage in scientific research and training.

In 2006 she was appointed as the first provost and academic vice president at Drew University in New Jersey. During her tenure, she shaped the direction and vision of the natural science programs and developed a successful strategic plan. At Drew she assisted in the design of a new science facility to support STEM mission. Her programs, among them, implementing new graduate programs, impacted student retention and student diversity. She also led Drew's strategic planning and assessment efforts.

=== York presidency ===
Gunter-Smith served as President of York College of Pennsylvania 2013- 2023. She rationalized that the transition to administration would have a greater impact by helping many research projects over working on a single research project. She determined that her legacy would be to influence young women, particularly those of color, to achieve their own path. She connected York College to York City through the opening of the Center for Community Engagement and Marketview Arts in downtown York. Both venues provide opportunities for students to engage with the local community through experiential learning and real-world problem-solving. She directed the creation of the Graham Center for Collaborative Innovation and the soon-to-be-completed York College Knowledge Park, a learning laboratory that will enhance opportunities for students and faculty to interact with local businesses and organizations. She expanded the academic programs through a five-school structure and included online offerings. Under her direction, York launched the first comprehensive campaign, EVOLVE: A Campaign for York College, to fund strategic initiatives including support for scholarships that ensures that education remains accessible.

As the first woman and person of color to serve as President of York College, Gunter-Smith embraced discussions of race and promoted a student-forward style of leadership. She focused York College toward educating the whole student to participate in a diverse world. Gunter-Smith terms herself a 'servant-leader,' serving by example at the institution. Her philosophy included the need to take risks and think outside the standard educational box as educational institutions move into the 21st century. She plans to retire in June, 2023.

=== Controversies ===
==== Billboard ====
During Gunter-Smith's presidency, York College of Pennsylvania created a billboard with the tagline "Envision the Possibilities". In an attempt to showcase diversity, the photograph used on the billboard was photoshopped to remove two white students who were replaced with "students who reflected diversity".

==== Art Exhibit ====
In 2017, Gunter-Smith approved an art exhibit to be exclusively open to students and their guests that depicted Ku Klux Klan members and used other racist language. The intent of the exhibit was to raise awareness of racism through provocative imagery, however, many believed this to be ill-suited for a college campus.

== Awards ==
- Woman of Distinction STEM Honoree 2022: Girl Scouts of the Heart of Pennsylvania.
- Spelman College Alumnae Achievement Award in Health and Sciences 2005
- Spelman College Presidential Faculty Award for Scholarly Achievement 2001
- Directors Award for excellence in dedicated service to the Armed Forces Radiobiology Research Institute 1992
- Served on the Pennsylvania State Board of Education 2016
- In 2024, Dr. Gunter-Smith was awarded the Association of Independent Colleges and Universities of Pennsylvania (AICUP) Francis J. Michelini Award for Outstanding Service to Higher Education.
