= Sheila L. Chamberlain =

American pilot

- Education: Spelman College; University of Oklahoma; University of Miami
- Employer: United States Army

Sheila L. Chamberlain is an American pilot. She was the first black woman combat intelligence pilot in the United States Army and the first woman to be elected to the national Tuskegee Airmen. She is a member of the United States Air Force Hall of Fame.

== Early life and education ==
Chamberlain grew up in West Germany. She attended Fort Knox High School. Her father was a United States Army engineer and her mother owned a business. Her cousin was Captain Luke Weathers, the only person from Memphis to become one of the original Tuskegee Airman. Chamberlain studied at Spelman College. She graduated magna cum laude from Spelman College in 1981. She was a postgraduate at the University of Oklahoma. Chamberlain attended flight school, where she was mentored by Willa Brown. She was the fifth African-American woman to graduate from the United States Army flight school.

== Career ==
In 1985, Chamberlain was made the United States Army first black woman combat intelligence pilot. Chamberlain spent fifteen years of service in the United States and overseas. She completed three tours in Grenada, Korea and Persian Gulf War. She held two command posts. Chamberlain was part of the unit that stabilised South Florida after Hurricane Andrew in 1992. She was the first woman to be elected to the Tuskegee Airmen in 1998. Chamberlain was a member of the Fort Rucker section of the Tuskegee Airmen. After Hurricane Andrew, Chamberlain decided to retire from the Army and returned to higher education. She earned a Juris Doctor at the University of Miami School of Law in 1996. After graduating, she worked as a senate legislative assistant. She ran as a democratic candidate for state senator.

She gave testimony to the United States House of Representatives on why women should be assigned to aviation units. A year after she left, the United States Department of Defense announced that women would be permitted to fly combat aircraft. She was part of the Women Veterans Organisation.

=== Awards and honors ===
Chamberlain has won various awards and honors, including the Tuskegee Airmen Blades Award, the National Defense Service Medal and the General George C. Marshall Award. In 2016 she was named as one of Legacy South Florida Magazine's top 25 most influential and prominent black women in business and industry. She was honoured as an exceptional alumna of Spelman College in 2018.
