= Marcelite J. Harris =

United States general (1943–2018)

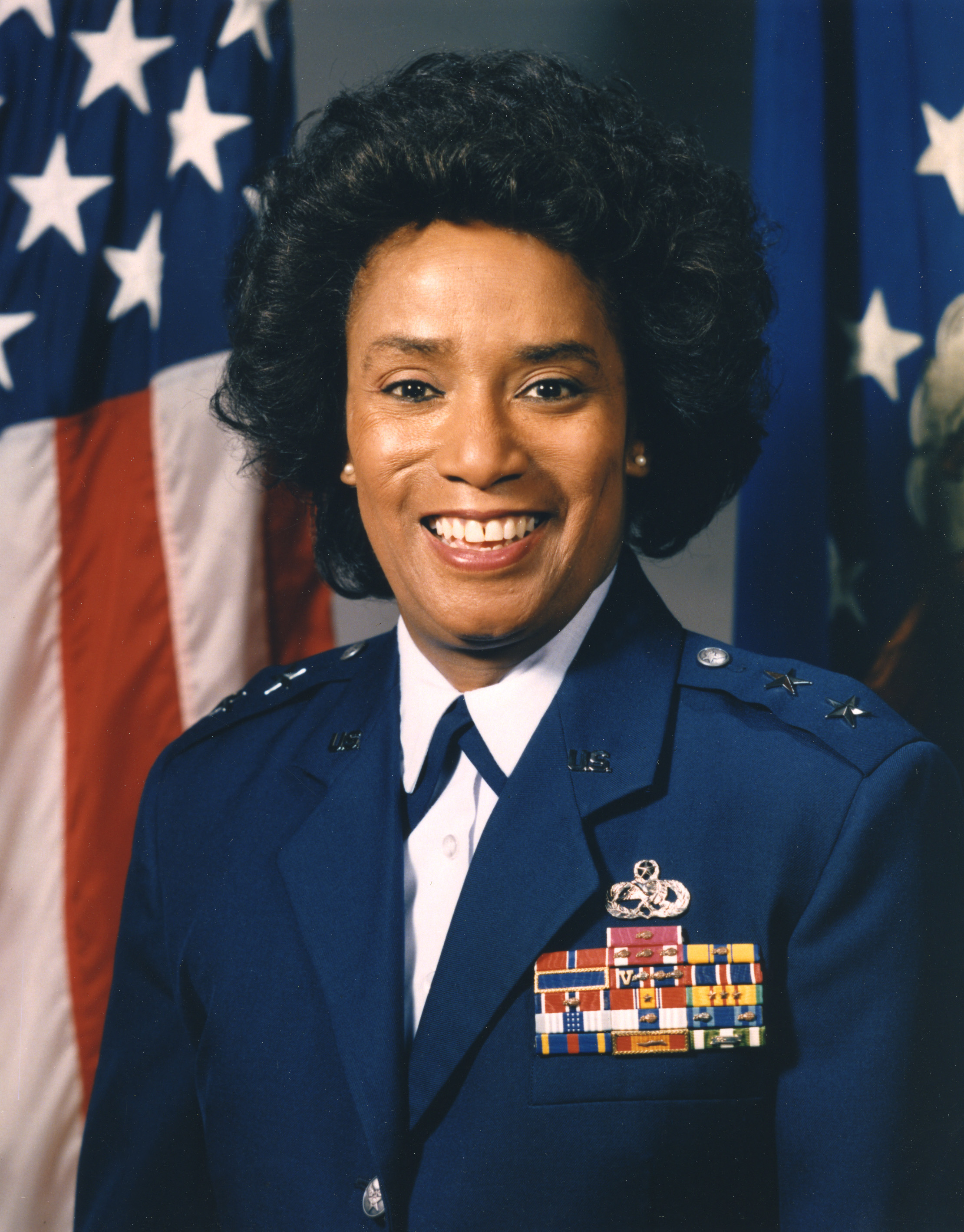
- U.S. Air Force Photo
- Born: Marcelite Cecile Jordan Harris; 16 January 1943; Houston, Texas, U.S.
- Died: 7 September 2018 (aged 75)
- Burial place: Arlington National Cemetery
- Spouse: Lt. Col. Maurice Harris
- Children: Lt. Col. Steven Harris; Tenecia Harris
- Military career
- Allegiance: United States of America
- Branch: United States Air Force
- Service years: 1965–97
- Rank: Major General
- Unit: United States Air Force Academy
- Conflicts: Vietnam War
- Awards: Legion of Merit (2); Bronze Star Medal; Meritorious Service Medal (4); Air Force Commendation Medal (2); National Defense Service Medal (2); Vietnam Service Medal (3); Vietnam Campaign Medal

Marcelite Cecile Jordan Harris (January 16, 1943 – September 7, 2018) was an American who became the first African-American female general officer of the United States Air Force.

== Education and early career ==
Marcelite Cecile Jordan Harris was born on January 16, 1943 in Houston, Texas, United States, to Cecil O’Neal Jordan and Marcelite Elizabeth (Terrell) Jordan. She graduated from Spelman College, earning her B.A. in speech and drama and completed Officer Training School, Lackland Air Force Base, Texas, in 1965 and held a variety of assignments in the Air Force.

Harris's career included many "firsts", including being the first female aircraft maintenance officer, one of the first two female air officers commanding at the United States Air Force Academy, and the Air Force's first female Director of Maintenance. She served as a White House social aide during the Carter administration. Her service medals and decorations include the Bronze Star, the Presidential Unit Citation, and the Vietnam Service Medal. Harris retired as a major general in 1997, the highest ranking female officer in the Air Force and the Nation's highest ranking African-American woman in the Department of Defense. Upon retirement from the Air Force, she served NASA as the Florida Site Director and Logistics Process Owner for United Space Alliance, the company managing the nation's shuttle program. Besides her Spelman B.A., she holds a B.S. in Business Management from the University of Maryland University College. In 1999, Harris was awarded an Honorary Doctorate Degree from Spelman College. She was a member of Delta Sigma Theta sorority.

== Later career ==
Harris was a Treasurer of the Atlanta Branch of the National Association for the Advancement of Colored People and served as a Director on the Board of Peachtree Hope Charter School. On September 15, 2010, she was appointed by President Barack Obama to serve as a member of the Board of Visitors for the United States Air Force Academy. The Board inquires into the morale, discipline, curriculum, instruction, physical equipment, fiscal affairs, academic methods and other matters relating to the academy which the Board decides to consider.

== Personal ==
Harris was married to Lt. Col. Maurice Harris. They had two children named Steven and Tenecia. She was buried with full military honors on February 7, 2019, alongside her husband in Arlington National Cemetery.

== Awards and decorations ==
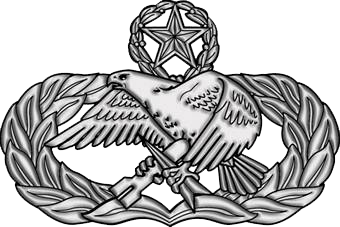
Master Maintenance Badge

Personal decorations
Width-44 crimson ribbon with a pair of width-2 white stripes on the edges	Legion of Merit with bronze oak leaf cluster
Width-44 scarlet ribbon with width-4 ultramarine blue stripe at center, surrounded by width-1 white stripes. Width-1 white stripes are at the edges.	Bronze Star Medal
Width-44 crimson ribbon with two width-8 white stripes at distance 4 from the edges.	Meritorious Service Medal with three bronze oak leaf clusters
	Air Force Commendation Medal with bronze oak leaf cluster
Unit awards
	Presidential Unit Citation
	Air Force Outstanding Unit Award with Valor device; silver, and two bronze oak leaf clusters
	Air Force Outstanding Unit Award Second ribbon required for proper spacing of accoutrements
	Air Force Organizational Excellence Award with bronze oak leaf cluster
Campaign and service medals
Width=44 scarlet ribbon with a central width-4 golden yellow stripe, flanked by pairs of width-1 scarlet, white, Old Glory blue, and white stripes	National Defense Service Medal with bronze Service star
	Vietnam Service Medal with three bronze campaign stars
Service, training, and marksmanship awards
	Air Force Overseas Short Tour Service Ribbon
	Air Force Overseas Long Tour Service Ribbon with bronze oak leaf cluster
	Air Force Longevity Service Award with silver and two bronze oak leaf clusters
	Air Force Training Ribbon
Foreign awards
	Vietnam Gallantry Cross Unit Award
	Vietnam Campaign Medal

=== Other achievements ===
1990 - Woman of the Year, National Organization of Tuskegee Airmen, also listed in "Who's Who Among Black Americans", "Who's Who in America" and "Who's Who Among American Business Women"
1990 - Outstanding Young Woman of America
1991 - Most Prestigious Individual, Dollars and Sense Magazine
1992 - Woman of Enterprise, Journal Recording Publishing Co., Oklahoma City
1995 - "Women of Distinction" Award, Thomas W. Anthony Chapter, Air Force Association
1995 - "Military African American Woman" for contributions to the Department of Defense, National Political Congress of Black Women, Inc.
1995 - "Black Woman of Courage," National Federation of Black Women Business Owners
1996 - Ellis Island Medal of Honor
2010 - "Trailblazer Award," Black Girls Rock Foundation

== Effective dates of promotion ==
Promotions
Insignia	Rank	Date
	Major General	May 25, 1995
	Brigadier General	May 1, 1991
	Colonel	September 1, 1986
	Lieutenant Colonel	October 1, 1981
	Major	April 1, 1975
	Captain	December 21, 1969
	First Lieutenant	January 21, 1967
	Second Lieutenant	December 21, 1965
