= Nora A. Gordon =

African American missionary and teacher

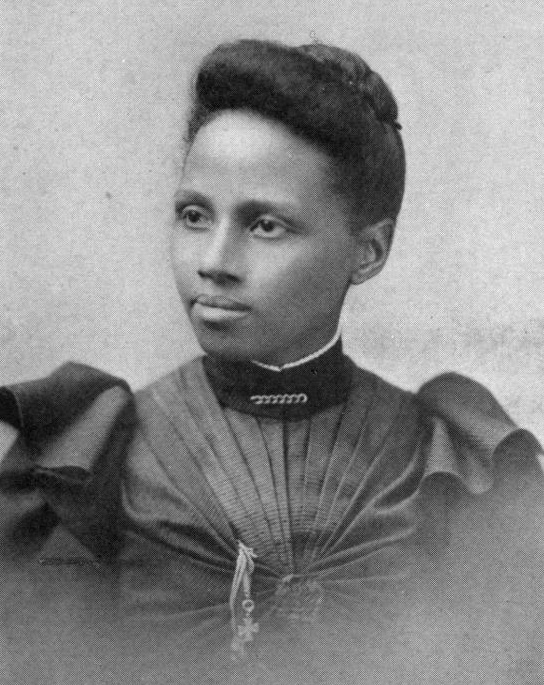
- Born: August 25, 1866; Columbus, Georgia
- Died: January 26, 1901 (aged 34); Atlanta, Georgia
- Occupation: Baptist missionary

Nora Antonia Gordon (August 25, 1866 – January 26, 1901) was an African American missionary and teacher.

== Early life and education ==
Nora Antonia Gordon was born in Columbus, Georgia to parents who had been slaves of Governor John B. Gordon. She attended a Christian missionary school in Cleveland, Ohio and after graduating, enrolled in seminary school in 1882. In 1888 she graduated from Spelman Seminary (which later became Spelman College).

== Career ==
She was selected from a pool of applicants to go as a missionary to Africa, and began the tradition of Spelman missionary work, as the first graduate to go to Africa. Though she had been offered a job as a school teacher in Atlanta, Gordon chose to accept the missionary assignment of the Women's Baptist Foreign Missionary Society of the West. She spent a year in a missionary school in London on her way to the Palabala mission in the Congo Free State, where she worked with Louise Celia Fleming, teaching students in both a schoolhouse and in Sunday School. In 1890, she was transferred to the Lukunga Mission Station in West Central Africa, where she founded a school with Clara Ann Howard, a classmate who also graduated from Spelman in 1887. Gordon was in charge of the afternoon school and the printing office.

In 1893, she took a leave of absence and returned to the United States, taking two young African women with her to begin their studies at Spelman.

== Personal life and legacy ==
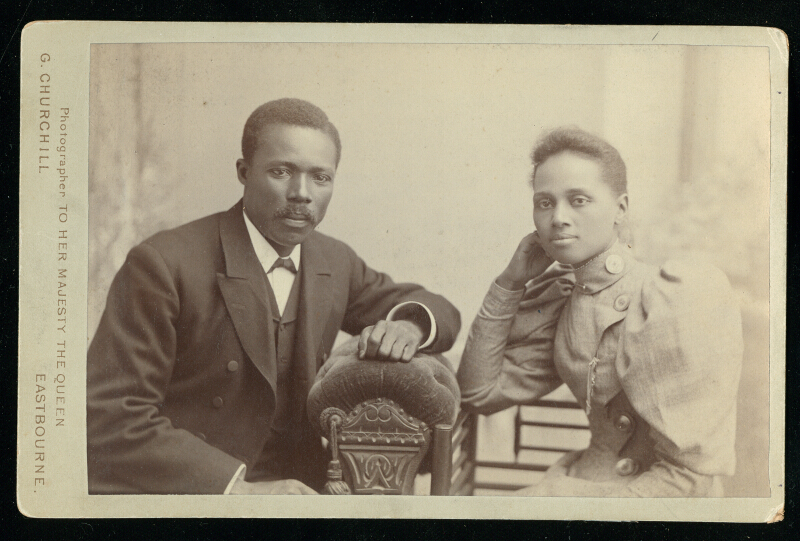
Nora Gordon with her husband Reverend Simeon Cunningham Gordon

In 1895, while in the US, she married Reverend Simeon Cunningham Gordon, a Jamaican who had attended Spurgeon's College in London. At Spelman, they were active in the "Congo Mission Circle" which prepared students for service in Africa. They returned to the Congo soon after their marriage accepting placement at Stanley Pool. Political difficulties and her poor health hindered their efforts. Gordon had two children in the Congo, but both died. After the second child's death, in 1900 she came back to the United States in poor health. Nora Gordon died in January 1901, at Spelman College.

The contribution of Gordon, and other African American women after her, such as Louise Fleming and Clara Howard, was significant in both the United States and in Africa, "for the change they helped bring about in the lives of African women and children".

== Bibliography ==
- Collier-Thomas, Bettye (2 February 2010). Jesus, Jobs, and Justice: African American Women and Religion. New York, New York: Knopf Doubleday Publishing Group. ISBN 978-0-307-59305-4.
- Green, Jeffrey (2012). Black Edwardians: Black People in Britain 1901-1914. New York, New York: Routledge. ISBN 978-1-136-31823-8.
- Lindley, Susan Hill; Stebner, Eleanor J. (2008). The Westminster Handbook to Women in American Religious History. Louisville, Kentucky: Westminster John Knox Press. ISBN 978-0-664-22454-7.
- Neverdon-Morton, Cynthia (1991). Afro-American Women of the South and the Advancement of the Race, 1895-1925. Knoxville, Tennessee: University of Tennessee Press. ISBN 978-0-87049-684-4.
- Reeves-Ellington, Barbara; Sklar, Kathryn Kish; Shemo, Connie A. (2009). Competing Kingdoms: Women, Mission, Nation, and the American Protestant Empire, 1812–1960. Durham, North Carolina: Duke University Press. ISBN 978-0-8223-9259-0.
- Weisenfeld, Judith; Newman, Richard (23 April 2014). This Far By Faith: Readings in African-American Women's Religious Biography. New York, New York: Routledge. ISBN 978-1-136-66351-2.

== Relevant literature ==
- "Death of Mrs. Gordon, of Stanley Pool. March 1901. The Missionary Herald of the Baptist Missionary Society. pp. 93,94.
