= Marionette Holmes =

American economist

- Education: Spelman College, B.A. Clark-Atlanta University, M.B.A. University of Georgia, Ph.D.
- Occupation: Economist
- Employer: Spelman College
- Website: https://www.spelman.edu/academics/majors-and-programs/economics/faculty/marionette-holmes

Marionette Holmes is an American economist who is currently Chair of the Department of Economics at Spelman College. She serves on the boards of the Committee on the Status of Women in the Economics Profession and the Sadie Collective, and is an advisory board member of the Journal of Economic Perspectives.

== Early life and education ==
Homes completed a BA in economics at Spelman College in 1990, an MBA at Clark Atlanta University, and a PhD in agricultural and applied economics at the University of Georgia in 2002.

== Career ==
Holmes began her career as a Fellow at the Centers for Disease Control Division of Global HIV/AIDS and TB, where she led a project examining the economic feasibility of shifting from one type of polio vaccine to another in Indonesia. She then spent several years as a project manager and researcher at Harvard School of Public Health before joining the faculty of Spelman College in 2006. She has chaired that college's economics department since 2016.

=== Selected works ===
- Holmes, Marionette, and Timothy A. Park. Portfolio decisions of small agribusinesses: Evidence from the 1993 National survey of small business finance. No. 372-2016-19449. 2000.
- Farahani, Mansour, Danae Roumis, Ajay Mahal, Marionette Holmes, Gillian Moalosi, Chris Molomo, and Richard Marlink. "Effects of AIDS-related disability on workforce participation and earned income in Botswana: A quasi-experimental evaluation." (2013).
- Holmes, Marionette, Taiwo Abimbola, Merry Lusiana, Sarah Pallas, Lee M. Hampton, Retno Widyastuti, Idawati Muas, Karlina Karlina, and Soewarta Kosen. "Resource needs for the trivalent oral polio to bivalent oral polio vaccine switch in Indonesia." The Journal of infectious diseases 216, no. suppl_1 (2017): S209-S216.
- Crosby, Dorian Brown, Melvinia Turner King, Andrew Young Global, Marionette Holmes, Charles Moses, and Willie Rockward. "Deliberating Politics and the Economy: Perspectives of African American College Students." National Political Science Review 19, no. 1 (2018): 122–143.
