= Clara Ann Howard =

American educator and missionary

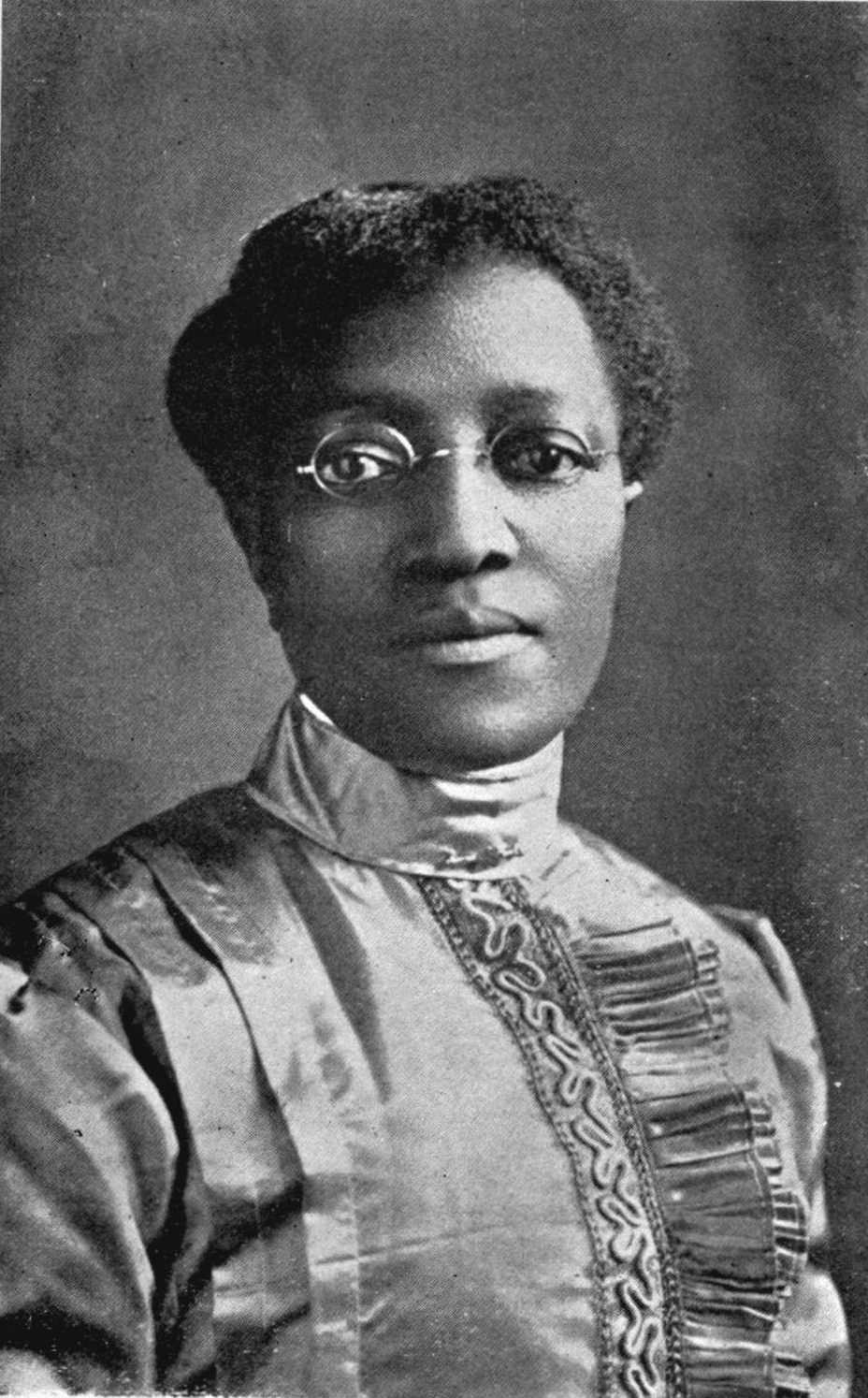
Clara Ann Howard, from a 1919 publication.

Clara Ann Howard (January 23, 1866 — May 2, 1935) was an American educator and, from 1890 to 1895, a Baptist missionary in Africa.

== Early life ==
Clara Ann Howard was from Greenville, Georgia, the only daughter of the nine children born to King Howard and Mary Ann Howard. Her father was born in slavery and bought his own freedom before Emancipation; he was literate, and a skilled carriage maker. She was raised in Atlanta, Georgia. She was one of the first students to attend Spelman Seminary, graduating as valedictorian of the class of 1887.

== Career ==
Howard taught school in Atlanta after college. In 1890, she joined the Women's Baptist Foreign Missionary Society, and was stationed at Lukunga in the Congo for the next five years. Howard was the second Spelman graduate to go to the Congo, after her classmate Nora A. Gordon, who arrived in Lukunga in 1889. The pair taught school, ran an orphanage, and even operated a printing office. "You can not imagine how glad we are to be together here," she wrote home to their friends in 1891.

She returned to the United States in 1895 for health reasons, though she returned to the mission field in Panama, briefly. In 1899 she joined the staff at Spelman Seminary, as a matron in the student boarding department, overseeing living arrangements for all the young women students at the school. Spelman's president, Lucy Hale Tapley, commended Howard, saying "Very few women could carry her work as well as she does. No matter what our difficulties, we can count on Miss Howard to be brave, co-operative, and helpful." Howard raised funds for African mission work through her later years, and provided particular support to several young Congolese women who were students at Spelman. Many of those women, in turn, became missionaries.

== Personal life ==
Howard died in 1935, aged 69 years. Howard-Harreld Hall at Spelman College, a dormitory opened in 1968, was named for Clara Ann Howard and Claudia White Harreld.
