= Audrey F. Manley =

Pediatrician, public health administrator

Audrey Manley
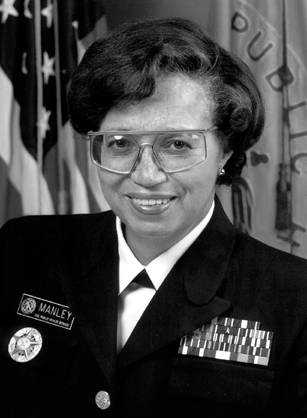

Surgeon General of the United States
- Acting
- In office January 1, 1995 – June 30, 1997
- President: Bill Clinton
- Preceded by: Joycelyn Elders
- Succeeded by: J. Jarrett Clinton (acting)

Personal details
- Born: Audrey Forbes Manley; March 25, 1934 (age 92) Jackson, Mississippi, U.S.
- Education: Spelman College (BS); Meharry Medical College (MD); Johns Hopkins University (MPH)

Audrey Forbes Manley (born March 25, 1934) is an American pediatrician and public health administrator. Manley was the first African-American woman appointed as chief resident at Cook County Children's Hospital in Chicago (1962), as well as the first to achieve the rank of assistant surgeon general (rear admiral) in 1988. She later served as the eighth president of Spelman College.

== Early life ==
Audrey Elaine Manley (née Forbes) was born on March 25, 1934, in Jackson, Mississippi. Her parents, Ora Lee Buckhalter and Jesse Lee Forbes, quickly relocated Manley and her two sisters, Barbara and Yvonne, to Tougaloo, Mississippi, near Tougaloo College. She was the eldest of three daughters in a tenant farming family.

Manley was inspired to pursue medicine after the death of her maternal grandmother, as well as with the encouragement of her seventh-grade science teacher. During World War II, the Forbes family moved to Chicago after her grandmother could no longer care for her and her siblings.

== Education ==
In 1951, Manley graduated as the class valedictorian of Wendell Phillips High School in Chicago. She attended Spelman College, where she majored in biology, with a double minor in chemistry and mathematics. She graduated cum laude from Spelman College in 1955. She continued her education at Meharry Medical College on a full-tuition scholarship and graduated in 1959. Nearly 30 years later, in 1987, Manley received a master's degree in public health from Johns Hopkins University.

== Career ==
In 1962, Manley began her medical career and completed her residency in Chicago by being appointed as the first African-American woman to be chief resident as Cook County Children's Hospital. During her residency, she taught pediatrics at the Cook County School of Nursing.

In 1970, Manley moved back to Atlanta after her marriage and began to work at Grady Memorial Hospital's Emory University Family Planning Clinic as the chief of Medical Services. She simultaneously began to serve as "First Lady" for the remainder of her husband's tenure as the fifth president of Spelman College and created initiatives such as the Health Career Program.

In 1976, Manley was appointed as a captain in the U.S. Public Health Service.

Over the next decade, Manley continued her medical pursuits in pediatrics and medical education at a number of institutions, including the University of Chicago, University of Illinois, Chicago Medical College, Emory University and Howard University. Additionally, Manley studied sickle cell disease and fought for government funding of sickle-cell research.

Beginning in 1989, Manley held a host of government jobs with the U.S. Public Health Service, including becoming the first Black woman to serve as principal deputy assistant for public health (1989), member of the U.S. delegation to UNICEF and the UNICEF/WHO Joint Committee on Health Policy (1990–1993), deputy surgeon general (1994), and co-founder acting deputy assistant secretary for minority health. Manley became the first Black woman to serve as acting surgeon general of the United States from 1995 to 1997, between the tenures of Joycelyn Elders and J. Jarrett Clinton. During her tenure, Manley focused on emphasizing the importance of physical activity and the health benefits accompanying exercise.

=== Spelman presidency ===
From 1997 to 2002, Manley served as the 8th president of Spelman College, a historically black college for women in Atlanta, Georgia. She was the first alumna to be elected president of the college, carrying on the legacy of her husband, Dr. Albert E. Manley, who was the first African American and male president of Spelman College from 1953 to 1976. During her tenure, the college continued to achieve high rankings in multiple areas, including the second-highest producer of black medical students. Spelman joined Division II of the NCAA and received a chapter in Phi Beta Kappa.

=== Later years ===
Though Manley has been retired since 2002, she continues to be involved in the National Merit Scholarship Corporation and the American Academy of Family Physicians.

== Personal life ==
During Manley's youth, she was well-connected in the black community, attending social events with the likes of Roy Wood and Don Cornelius.

Manley also demonstrated her passion for service with Crossroads Africa, where she ran a children's ward in a Nigerian hospital. Additionally, she worked in San Francisco to give medical services to children addicted to drugs.

The earliest known encounter between Manley (then Forbes) and her future husband, Albert Manley, occurred while Manley was still a student at Spelman, where she convinced then-president Manley to allow her to take advanced science courses at Morehouse College. The two reconnected when Forbes was chosen as a board of trustees member at Spelman. The couple married in 1970.

== Legacy ==
Manley has received awards from the National Council of Negro Women (1979), the United States Public Health Service (1981, 1992), the Young Women's Christian Association (1999) and the Atlanta City Council (2002). She has received honorary degrees from Tougaloo College in 1991, and is an honorary member of Delta Sigma Theta, Incorporated. The Albro Falconer Manley Science Center at Spelman College was partly named for Manley in 2002.
