= York College of Pennsylvania =

Private college in Spring Garden Township, Pennsylvania, U.S.

Coordinates: 39.9467°N 76.7295°W

- Former names: York County Academy (1787–1941); York Collegiate Institute (1872–1941); York Junior College (1941–1968)
- Motto: Servire Est Vivere (Latin)
- Motto in English: To Serve Is to Live
- Type: Private college
- Established: 1787; 239 years ago
- Endowment: $198 million (2025)
- President: Thomas Burns
- Undergraduates: 3,800
- Postgraduates: 475
- Location: Spring Garden Township, Pennsylvania, U.S.
- Campus: Suburban, 190 acres (77 ha)
- Colors: Green & white
- Nickname: Spartans
- Sporting affiliations: NCAA Division III, MAC Commonwealth Conference
- Website: ycp.edu
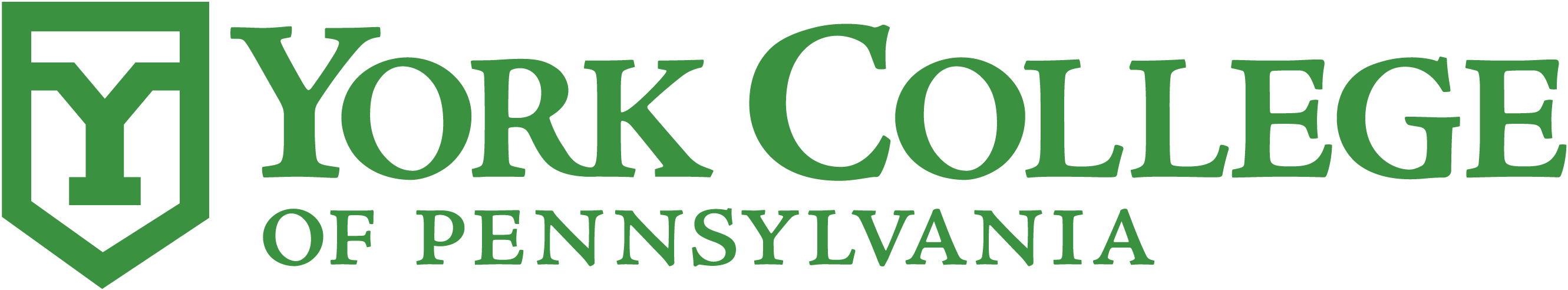

York College of Pennsylvania is a private college in Spring Garden Township, Pennsylvania, near the city of York. It offers more than 70 baccalaureate majors in professional programs, the sciences, and humanities to over 4,000 undergraduate and graduate students. It offers master's programs in business, public policy, education, and nursing, along with doctoral programs in nursing practice and education.

== History ==
York College of Pennsylvania traces its institutional lineage to the York County Academy, a school opened in the 1770s in downtown York, Pennsylvania that was connected to St. John's Episcopal Church, which was led by Rev. John Andrews, D.D. In 1787, the school received its charter from the General Assembly of Pennsylvania and was incorporated as the "York County Academy". The academy held a close connection with St. John's Church in York from that time until 1799. Thaddeus Stevens taught at the academy in 1815–1816, prior to establishing his law practice and serving as a U.S. congressman.

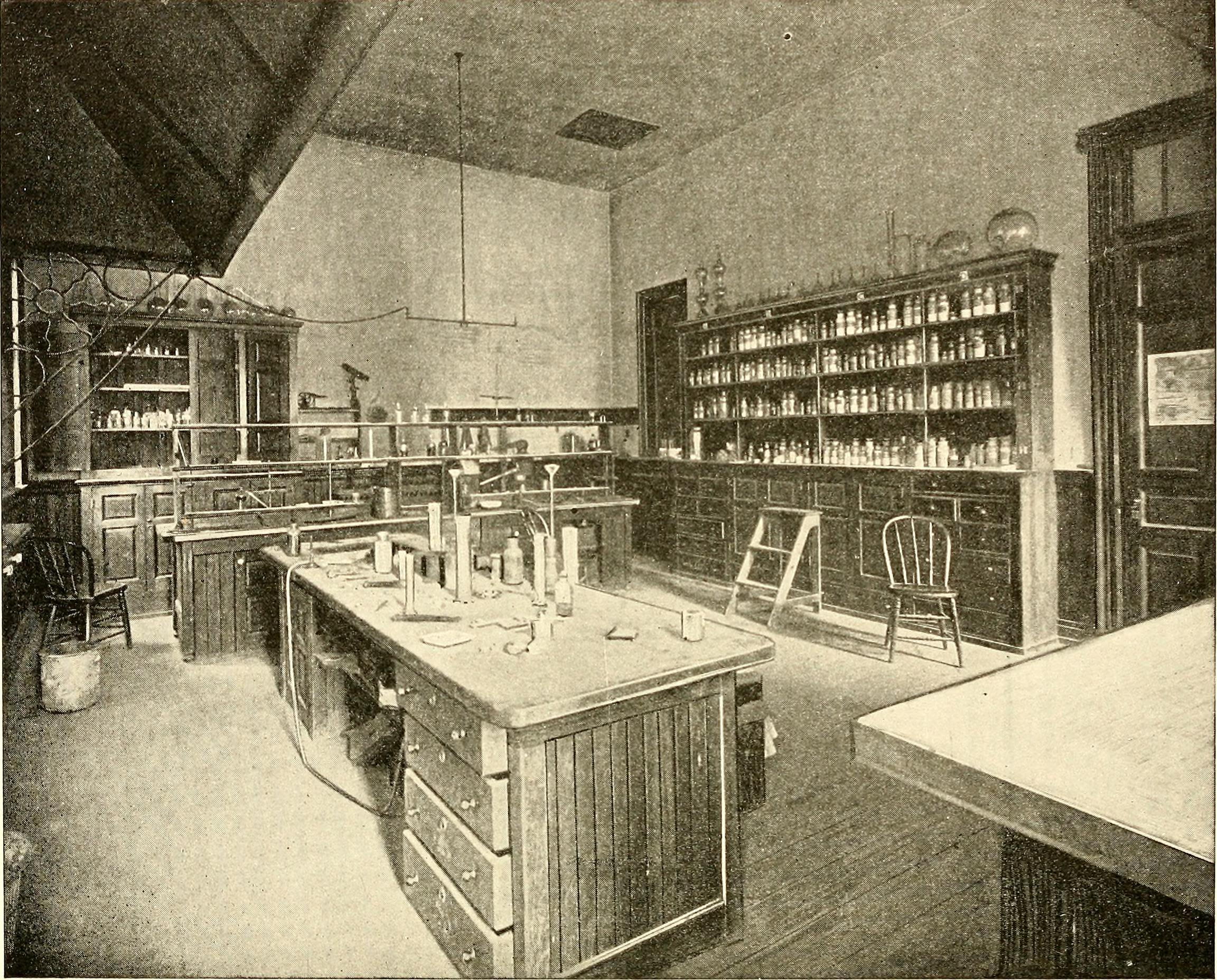
College laboratory in 1912

York College also traces its roots to a second institution, the "York Collegiate Institute" (YCI), which was founded around 1872. The building that housed the institute, located on the corner of College Avenue and Duke Street, was destroyed by fire in December 1885. A new four-story building designed by architects John A. Dempwolf and Reinhardt Dempwolf was completed at the same location in late 1886. The building was demolished in 1969 after being sold.

In 1929, the York County Academy and YCI entered into a teaching agreement, then in 1941 merged to become "York Junior College". Under its new charter, the combined institution shifted its focus from elementary and secondary education to post-secondary education. At this point, the school began to outgrow its campus, forcing a move outside of downtown York. In 1965, the current campus, located in Spring Garden Township, was dedicated. The former occupier of these lands was the Outdoor Country Club and golf course, which moved north of the city after selling its property. The campus is located about 100 miles (160 km) west of Philadelphia and 52 miles (84 km) north of Baltimore. By 1968, York College established an accredited four-year bachelor's degree program, and officially became "York College of Pennsylvania".

In 1975, York College absorbed York Country Day School (YCDS), thereby expanding its mission to again encompass K–12 education. YCDS was founded in 1953 by former YCI faculty after YCI phased out the elementary and secondary programs. Today the college sits near the historic center of York City, with some of its residence halls located in the city, which is known as the first national capital of the United States of America and the birthplace of Articles of Confederation.

The paper mill that was purchased recently is slated to be turned into a knowledge park. On November 12, 2026 it was announced that York College would acquire the Penn State York campus at the cost of $7.4MM in partnership with WellSpan Health.

== Campus ==
York College is currently located on three adjacent campuses with the majority of its academic buildings on the Main Campus, a few on its more recently built West Campus and several facilities on its North Campus. Despite the college's extensive history, all the buildings on campus are less than 50 years of age, with the majority being built during the 1960s. The buildings utilize a standard red brickwork style, enhanced with white marble on some buildings. Some buildings on campus were financed with the college's cash savings in order to avoid debt as part of an overall focus on maintaining low tuition rates. York College also maintains two off campus buildings in the City of York.

=== Main campus ===
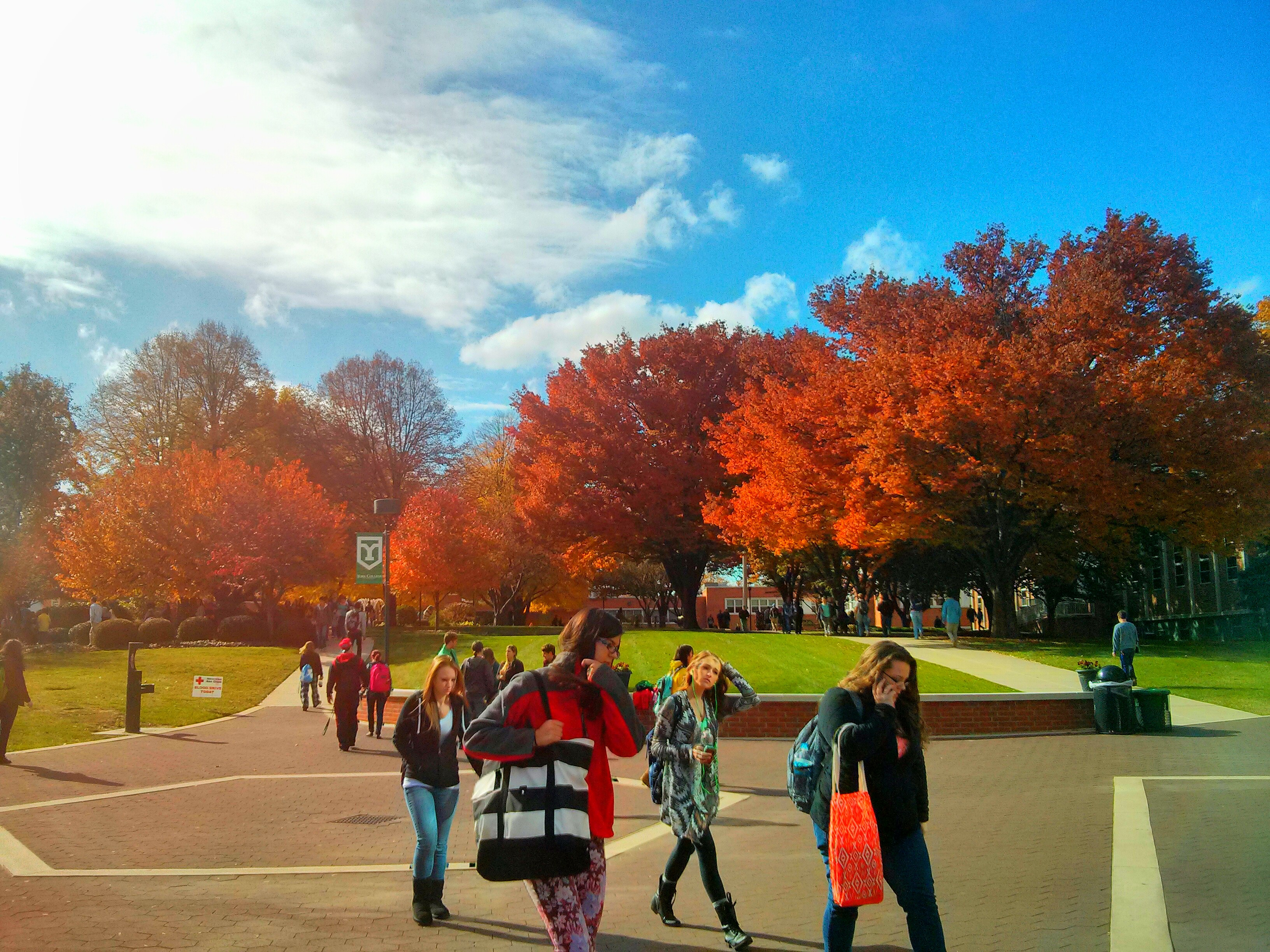
Students walking to class on a fall day

The focal point of York College's 190-acre park-like campus is the mall, a grassy quad around which many of the college's academic buildings are located. The Evelyn and Earle Wolf Hall is the center for artistic activity on campus. It includes three art studios, a photography facility, rehearsal and practice rooms, a multi-track recording studio and mixing control room, a music library, editing suites, studios, two video production facilities coordinated by a computer-assisted control room, and DeMeester Recital Hall, a venue that hosts various speakers as well as performances by many of the college's musical ensembles.

Also located in Wolf Hall are the York College Galleries. Comprising two adjacent galleries, the Cora Miller Gallery and the Brossman Gallery, this exhibition space serves the college, the City of York, and the communities of southcentral Pennsylvania and northern Maryland. The Galleries feature a varied program of nationally touring exhibitions and invitational shows, as well as faculty and juried student shows, artist and curator lectures, workshops, book signings, and other events.

Located adjacent to Wolf is Campbell Hall, home to the Student Success Division, which includes the Academic Advising Center, Academic Support Center, Career Development Center, Community Scholarship Program, Student Accessibility Services, Study Abroad Center, Undeclared Student Advising, and the Writing Center. Campbell also includes chemistry instrumentation to support majors in Chemistry, Forensic Chemistry and Pre-Med.

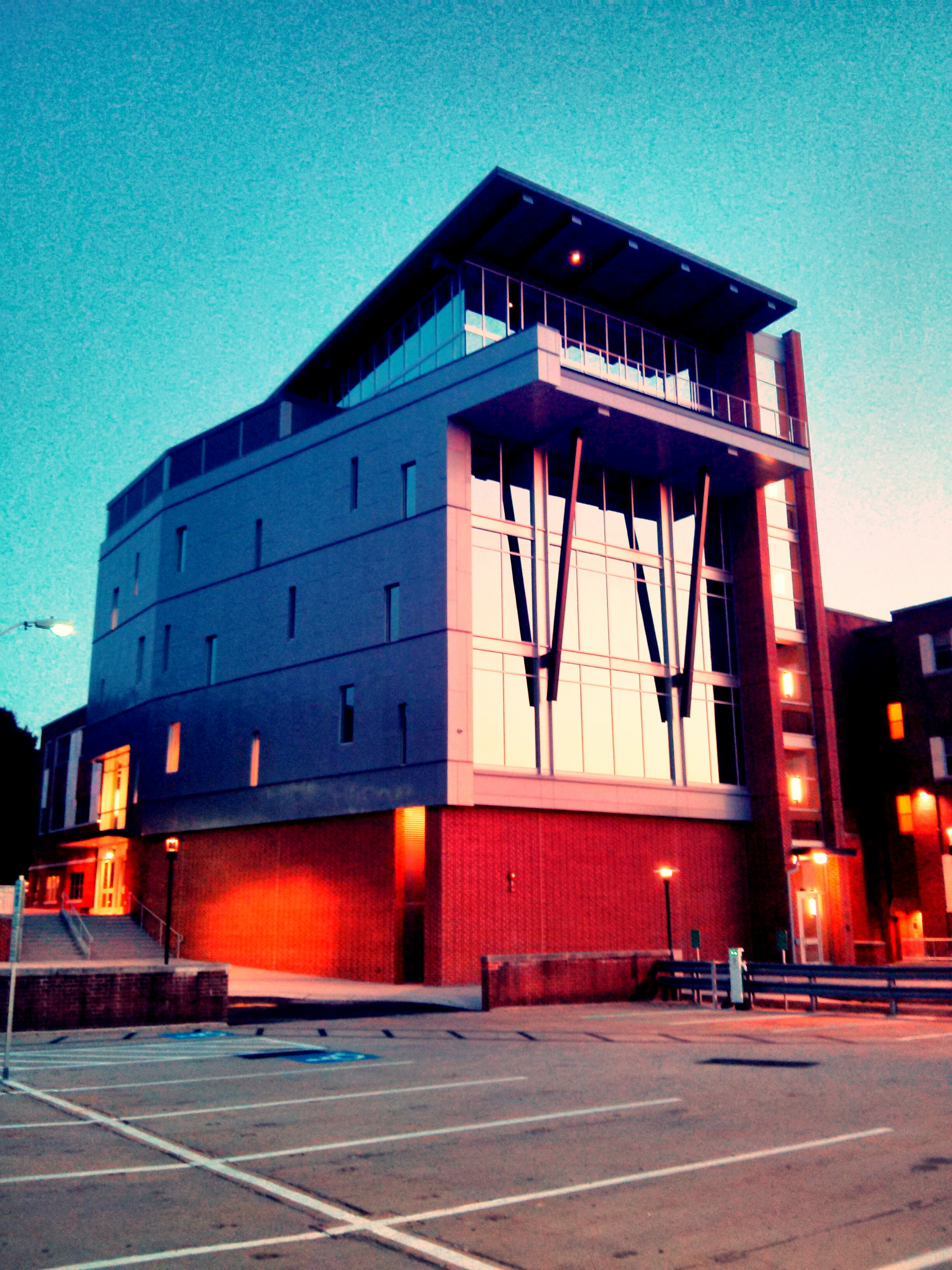
Willman Business Center at York College

Next to Campbell is the Appell Life Sciences Building, which features modern laboratory spaces, multiple specialty spaces (tissue culture suite, microscopy lab, walk-in cold room), research and preparation spaces, and student and faculty conference rooms for the departments of Biological Sciences, Behavioral Sciences and Education. Connected to Appell is the Willman Business Center, which opened in 2013 and is home to the Graham School of Business. Willman features the Weinstock Lecture Hall, a 150-seat tiered auditorium, the NASDAQ Trading Laboratory which provides students with direct access to real-time financial data from stock and commodities exchanges, and Yorkview Hall, a glass-enclosed corporate training center that offers fantastic views atop the center.

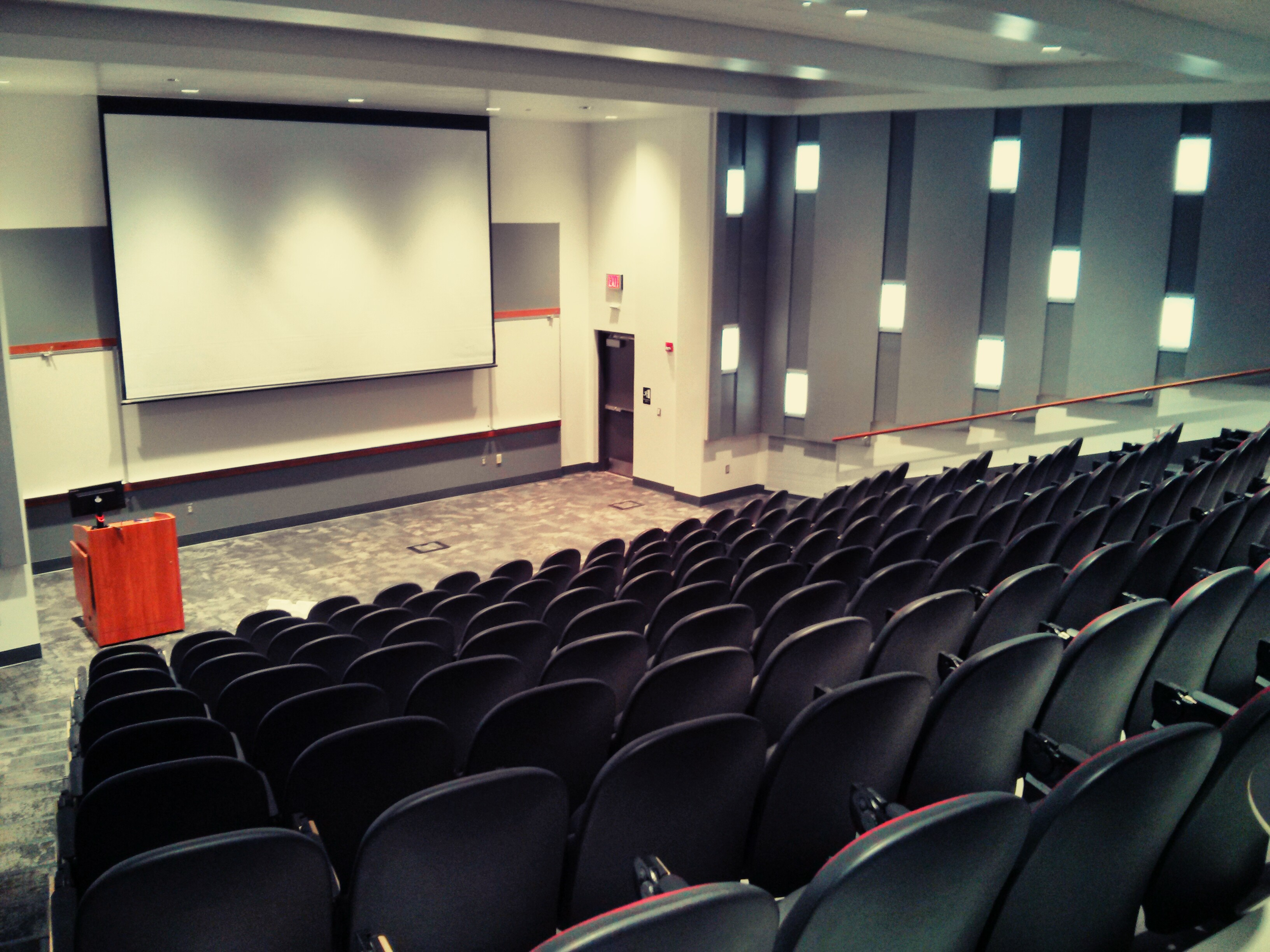
Weinstock Lecture Hall at York College of Pennsylvania

The Naylor Ecological Sciences Center, located behind Appell, is a three-story structure topped by five greenhouses that provide teaching and research labs for ecological studies on plants and animals (Aquatic and Terrestrial Labs), a large aquarium space for students doing research with fish and invertebrates, a controlled growth chamber and research spaces.

Schmidt Library, located to the right of Willman on the mall, houses print and online collections, as well as the college's Archives. Schmidt Library loans out wireless laptops for use in the building, digital cameras, camcorders, and media projection materials. The building also provides quiet study floors, technology-enhanced group study rooms, comfortable lounge areas, and wireless network connections including the outdoor courtyard. The Library underwent extensive interior renovations in 2004, adding 17 group study areas along with infrastructure and equipment to facilitate an increased focus on digital media.

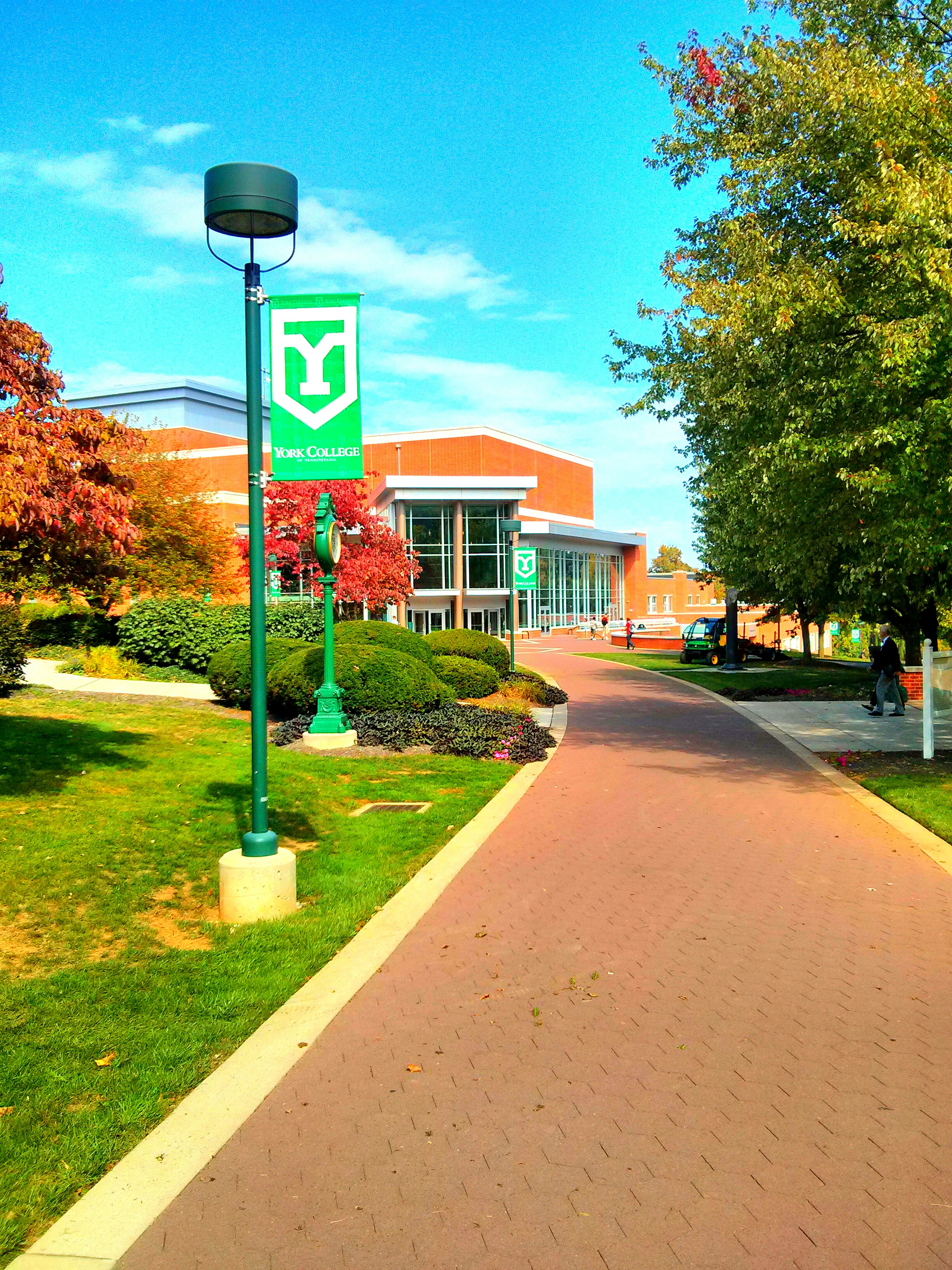
The Waldner Performing Arts Center

The Waldner Performing Arts Center (WPAC) and Humanities Center occupy the space between the Schmidt Library and the Iosue Student Union. The Waldner Performing Arts Center, which opened in fall 2008, features the 705-seat York Collegiate Theatre and the 125-seat Perko Playpen Theatre, an experimental black box-type theatre. The York College Players, who perform on both stages, enjoy a scene shop, green room and costume shop. The York Collegiate Theatre hosts musical performances, nationally recognized speakers and other special events.

The Humanities Center, home to the Department of History and Political Science and the Department of English and Humanities, features an oral history lab and museum studies room, film study labs and a film screening room, computer labs, and a Starbucks cafe. The World Languages Media Center allows students to further study in languages, and the Center for Teaching and Learning offers academic support (like tutoring and writing assistance) to students.

Between the Humanities and the Iosue Student Union sits The Rock or Old Spart. After commencement, the graduating class writes their names and messages in white on a large rock painted Spartan Green.

At the center of student life is the Robert V. Iosue Student Union. Johnson Dining Hall, located on the first floor, serves breakfast, lunch and dinner, and Spart's Den, in the lower level, offers a grab-and-go option, as well as a venue for entertainment such as comedy and music. The Student Activities and Orientation Office plans events for students, and also provide a number of leadership opportunities to more than 80 student clubs and organizations. The bookstore is a shop for student essentials. WVYC, the college radio station that broadcasts more than 100 hours each week, is located in the Student Union, as is the Admissions Welcome Center, where counselors offer information sessions and campus tours twice a day.

The Student Union also houses provides space for the nearly 80 student organizations at York College, and the Office of Residence Life occupies the second floor of the Student Union.

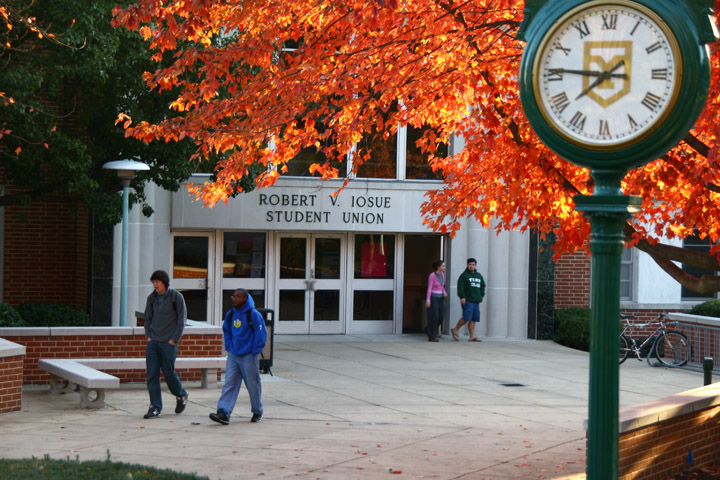
The Robert V. Iosue Student Union building

Adjacent to the Student Union is the Miller Administration Building. Bearing the name of the college's first president, the building includes the President's Office, the Office of Admissions, Academic Affairs, Business Affairs, Campus Operations, Financial Aid Office, and Registrar.

The Main campus is also home to many of York's 900 freshman students, who may reside in either one of the residence halls in the Penn/Beard Complex or the Manor Complex. Each complex houses about 500 students in 11 (six in Penn/Beard, five in Manor) traditional-style residence halls. Upperclassman residence halls on the main campus include Susquehanna Hall and the Tyler Run Complex, which house students in apartment-style suites, each accommodating two to four students. Students may also live in one of three communal living houses on main campus: Springettsbury Hall, Pershing House, and Springdale House.

The two oldest buildings on campus are the Brougher Chapel and the President's Home. In addition to the main worship area, Brougher contains space for religious activities, meditation, counseling and special events. As the center of faith at York, Brougher facilitates the services of a Catholic priest, Protestant minister, and Rabbi, all of whom are available to students for counseling, religious guidance, and support. There are four religious student organizations: Newman Club (Catholic Campus Ministry), Inter-Varsity Christian Fellowship, Christian Fellowship Organization, and Hillel.

The President's Home, a Williamsburg-style property adjacent to campus, is the setting for receptions for visiting artists, lecturers, and special guests.

The easternmost portion of campus features several athletic facilities: tennis courts, Spartan Softball Field, Jaquet Field (home to Spartan Baseball), the rugby field, and various intramural fields. Flowing through Main Campus is Tyler Run, a picturesque spring-fed brook lined with willows. It serves as the municipal boundary between York City and Spring Garden Township.

=== West Campus ===
Athletics facilities at the West Campus

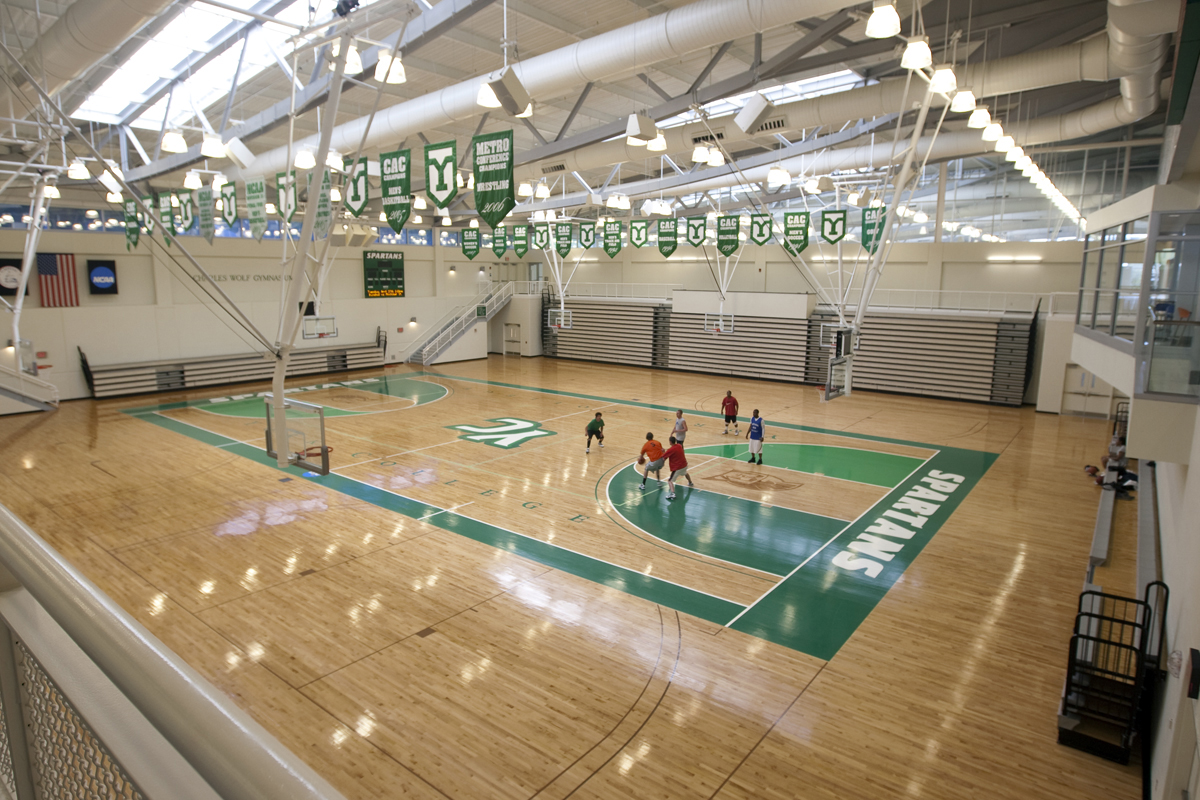
The Charles Wolf Gymnasium in the Grumbacher Sport and Fitness Center]

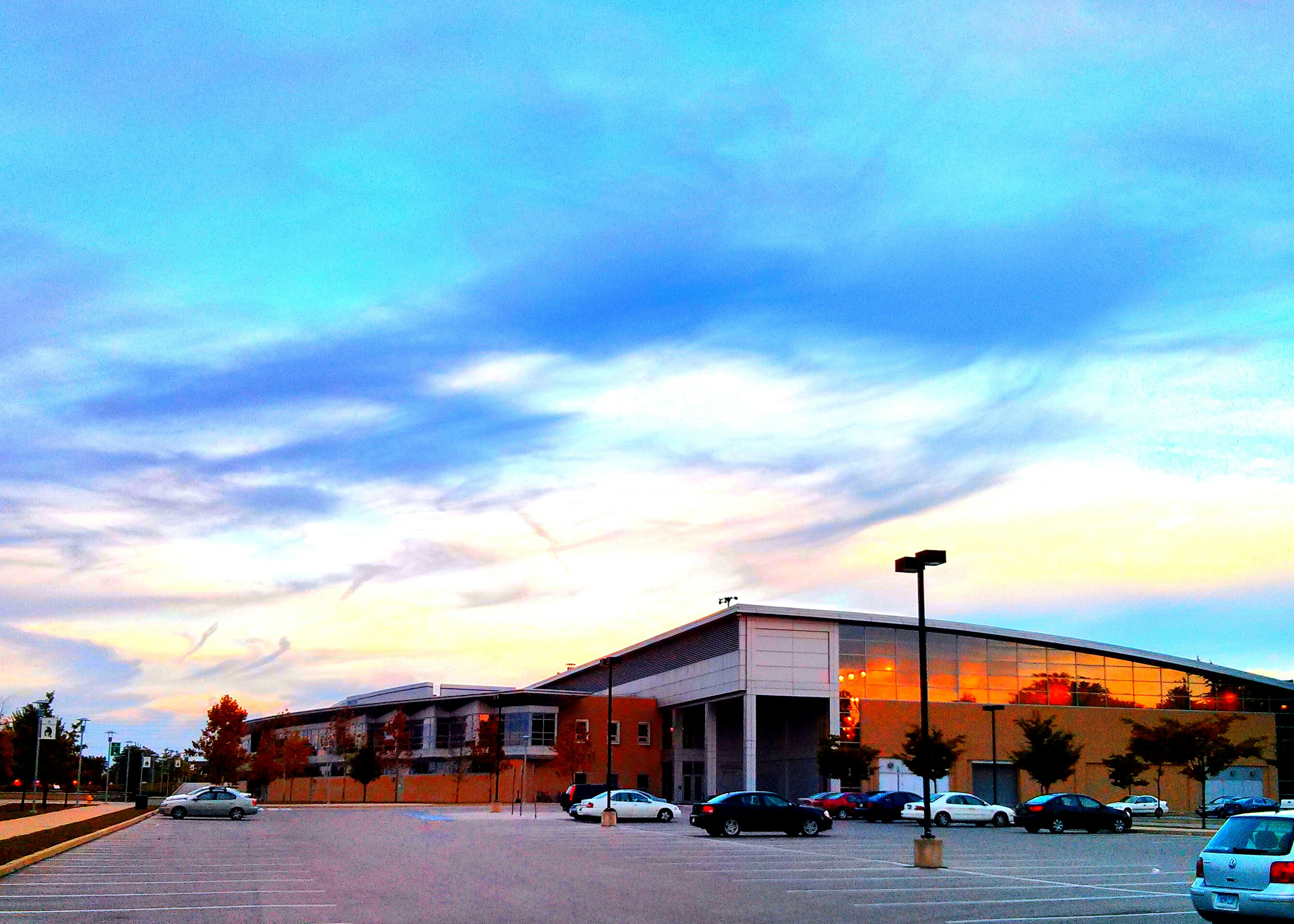
A view of the Grumbacher Sport and Fitness Center

At the center of West Campus sits the Grumbacher Sport and Fitness Center, a 160,000-square-foot (15,000 m^{2}) complex featuring the Charles Wolf Gymnasium, a 1,712-seat arena hosting varsity competition in men's and women's basketball, volleyball and wrestling; a ten-lane competitive pool with instructional areas and 1- and 3-meter diving boards; a three-court field house; locker room facilities; a climbing wall; a cafe; and a 7,600 square feet (710 m^{2}) fitness area. Diehl Hall houses York's Stabler Department of Nursing, as well as the hospitality management and sports management programs. It was expanded in 2012 to better accommodate the growing needs of all three programs. Grantley Hall has general-use classrooms and is home to the Division of Advancement (Alumni Relations, Development, and Communications).

The West Campus residential quad consists of Richland Hall, Spring Garden Apartments, Brockie Commons, Country Club Apartments and Little Run Lodge, the last of which is a suite style residence hall complex which includes a student center with a dining facility, central mailboxes, multipurpose space, TV lounges, and game room. The West Campus residential quad primarily houses upperclassmen in apartment style residences that typically have room for anywhere from two to five students.

=== North Campus ===
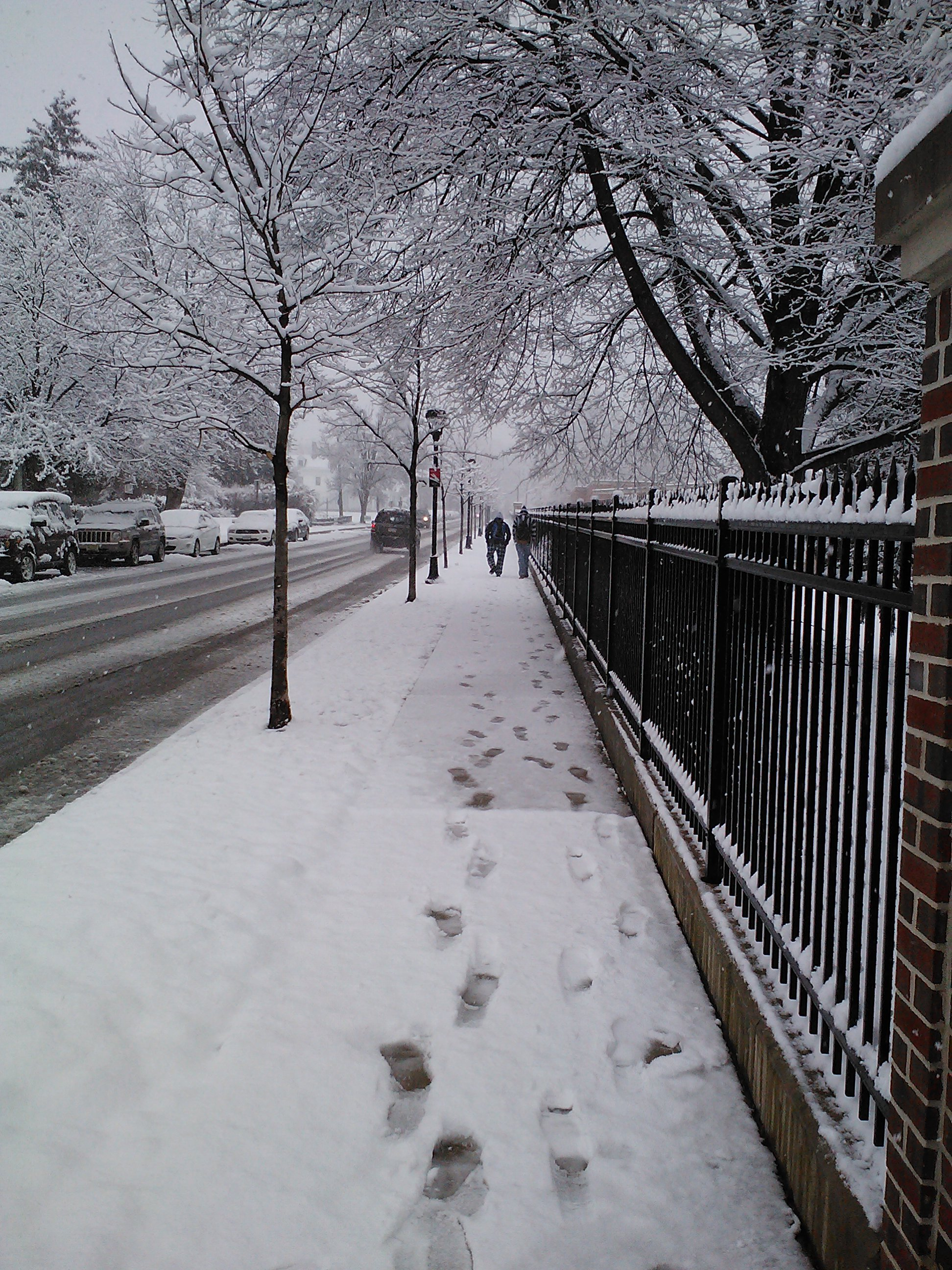
Students walking to class on a snowy day

The Kinsley Engineering Center, which is 43,000 square feet (4,000 m^{2}), features a large common project work space area to be used by the mechanical, electrical and computer engineering disciplines. The building also features gathering points for students to meet in small work groups or in social settings. The building was converted from a factory; it is LEED certified silver. It is named after the Kinsley Family Foundation.

Northside Commons is a five-story residence located on the northern end of campus. Built in 2011, with housing for 275 students in single and double bedrooms, an expansion was completed in 2026, adding an additional 204 beds. The building houses a mix of freshmen and returning students, the commons also includes lounge and common areas for residents.

Kings Mill Depot, located across the train tracks from Northside Commons, houses the college's J.D. Brown Center for Entrepreneurship, a hub for innovation and entrepreneurial activity at York College. A key component of the J.D. Brown Center is the business incubator, which gives small businesses resources such as office space, and access to York College's intellectual resources.

=== Off Campus Buildings ===
York College of Pennsylvania has two separate buildings located in the City of York that help the college to extend its reach into the city.

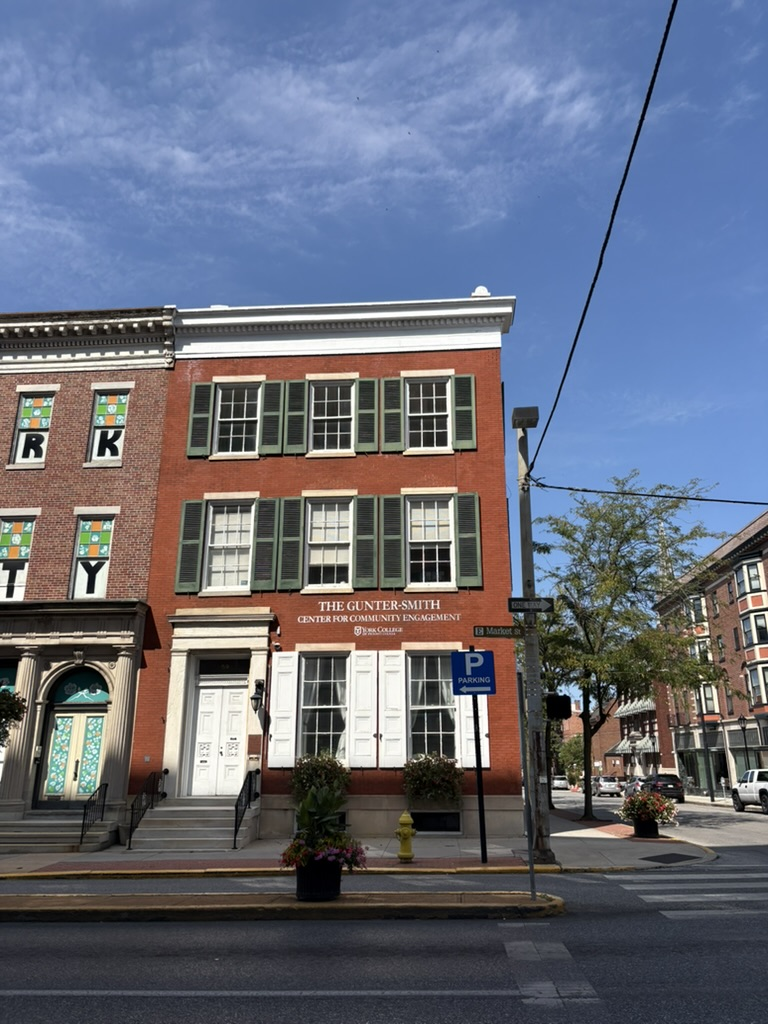
The front of the Gunter-Smith Center for Community Engagement taken from across East Market Street

Located on the corner of East Market Street and Duke Street, The Gunter-Smith Center for Community Engagement (CCE) is intended by the college to serve as “...a center for fostering connections between York College of Pennsylvania and the community at large.” The building now occupied by the CCE was originally built as a townhouse by Philip Albright Small in 1839 and has been occupied by several tenants prior to it being acquired by York College. Its most famous tenant was the Lafayette Club, an exclusive social club that was originally founded in 1898 and occupied the building that is now the CCE from 1912 until the club closed down in 2012. In 2015 the previous owner of the building anonymously gifted it to York College who then proceeded to renovate the building so that it could open as the CCE. The building now hosts the offices for the Center for Community Engagement Division and the Arthur J. Glatfelter Institute for Public Policy, it also has additional space that can be used for classes, community meetings, and private events.

York College also owns Marketview Arts, an arts building located on Philadelphia Street, across the street from Central Market. Marketview Arts houses studio space for York College arts students as well as two gallery spaces that can be used for exhibits held at Marketview.

== Organization and administration ==
The current president of York College is Thomas D. Burns, who was selected as the fifth president and began serving as such on July 1, 2023. He previously served as a provost at Belmont. He succeeded Pamela Gunter-Smith, who was the first woman and first African American to serve as president and who retired June 30, 2023, after 10 years as president. Other York College presidents include Ray A. Miller, Ph.D., (1968–1975) and Robert V. Iosue, Ph.D., (1976–1991). Iosue (/ˈjɑːz.weɪ/ YAHZ-way) drew national attention for his controversial criticisms of what he regarded as the run-away expense of higher education. At York College, he was noted for paying faculty well but expecting them to spend more time teaching than they might be required to elsewhere. He himself worked weekends and took no vacations for eight years.

The Student Senate is the executive and administrative agency for York College students and embodies a unique system of government. All students who pay the student activity fee are automatically members of the Student Association and any student may attend meetings or address the Association on matters that are of concern to the student body.

== Academics ==
York College offers its more than 70 baccalaureate majors through four schools: Graham School of Business; Dr. Donald E. and Lois J. Myers School of Nursing and Health Professions; Kinsley School of Engineering, Sciences and Technology; School of the Arts, Humanities, Education, and Social Sciences. Graduate offerings are master's programs in business administration, education, and nursing, along with a doctorate in nursing practice. The college's faculty includes 156 full-time professors. It is accredited by the Middle States Association of Colleges and Schools.

York College's focus is on preparing students for professional careers, while remaining an affordable private college.

As a cost-saving measure, York College requires its full-time professors to teach four courses per semester, compared to the norm of two or three at most U.S. colleges and universities.

=== Rankings ===
The college is ranked by U.S. News & World Report as 81th (tie) in its Regional Universities of the North category as of 2027 and is named a Best Mid-Atlantic College by The Princeton Review. The college is also ranked as 2027 Best College by Time Magazine and is ranked by Money Magazine amaong the 2026 Best Colleges in America. The college was listed among 100 "Colleges Worth Considering" nationwide by The Washington Post.

== Student life ==
On-campus entertainment events are produced by the Campus Activities Board, a independently operated committee of the Student Senate.

York College is the host campus for WVYC, York College's student-run radio station, and YCP Rhapsody, an a cappella singing group, along with as many as 80 other clubs and organizations. The college has many academic organizations such as, the York College Chapter of the American Marketing Association, Chemistry Society, and YCP Women in Science and Engineering, among others.

=== Social organizations ===
Fraternities and sororities involve around 15% of York College students. The following organizations are represented.

Fraternities:

- Zeta Beta Tau (ΖΒΤ)
- Kappa Delta Rho (ΚΔΡ) - Gamma Gamma chapter
- Tau Kappa Epsilon (ΤΚΕ)
- Phi Sigma Phi (ΦΣΦ)
- Kappa Delta Phi (ΚΔΦ)

Sororities:

- Alpha Sigma Tau (ΑΣΤ)
- Chi Upsilon Sigma (ΧΥΣ)
- Delta Phi Epsilon (ΔΦΕ)
- Delta Sigma Theta (ΔΣΘ)
- Phi Mu (ΦΜ)
- Phi Sigma Sigma (ΦΣΣ)
- Sigma Gamma Rho (ΣΓΡ)
- Sigma Delta Tau (ΣΔΤ)

York College also has the Alpha Zeta chapter of the Phi Sigma Pi (ΦΣΠ) honor fraternity, Alpha Chi Sigma (ΑΧΣ) professional chemistry fraternity, Delta Alpha Pi disabilities honor society, and the Eta Eta chapter of Sigma Theta Tau (ΣΘΤ) nursing honor society.

=== Athletics ===
York athletics mark

The Spartans have 11 men's and 13 women's programs and compete in NCAA Division III. Men's programs include baseball, basketball, cross country, golf, indoor track and field, lacrosse, soccer, swimming, tennis, track and field, and wrestling. Women's programs include basketball, cross country, field hockey, golf, indoor track and field, lacrosse, soccer, softball, swimming, tennis, track and field, volleyball, and wrestling.

York College does not have a football team, though the sport's absence is a popular topic for speculation. While the institution was operating as York Collegiate Institute, there was an active football team. The college bookstore does sell York College Football t-shirts, with the phrase "Undefeated since 1787" printed on the back. These are one of the more popular clothing items sold by the York College Bookstore.

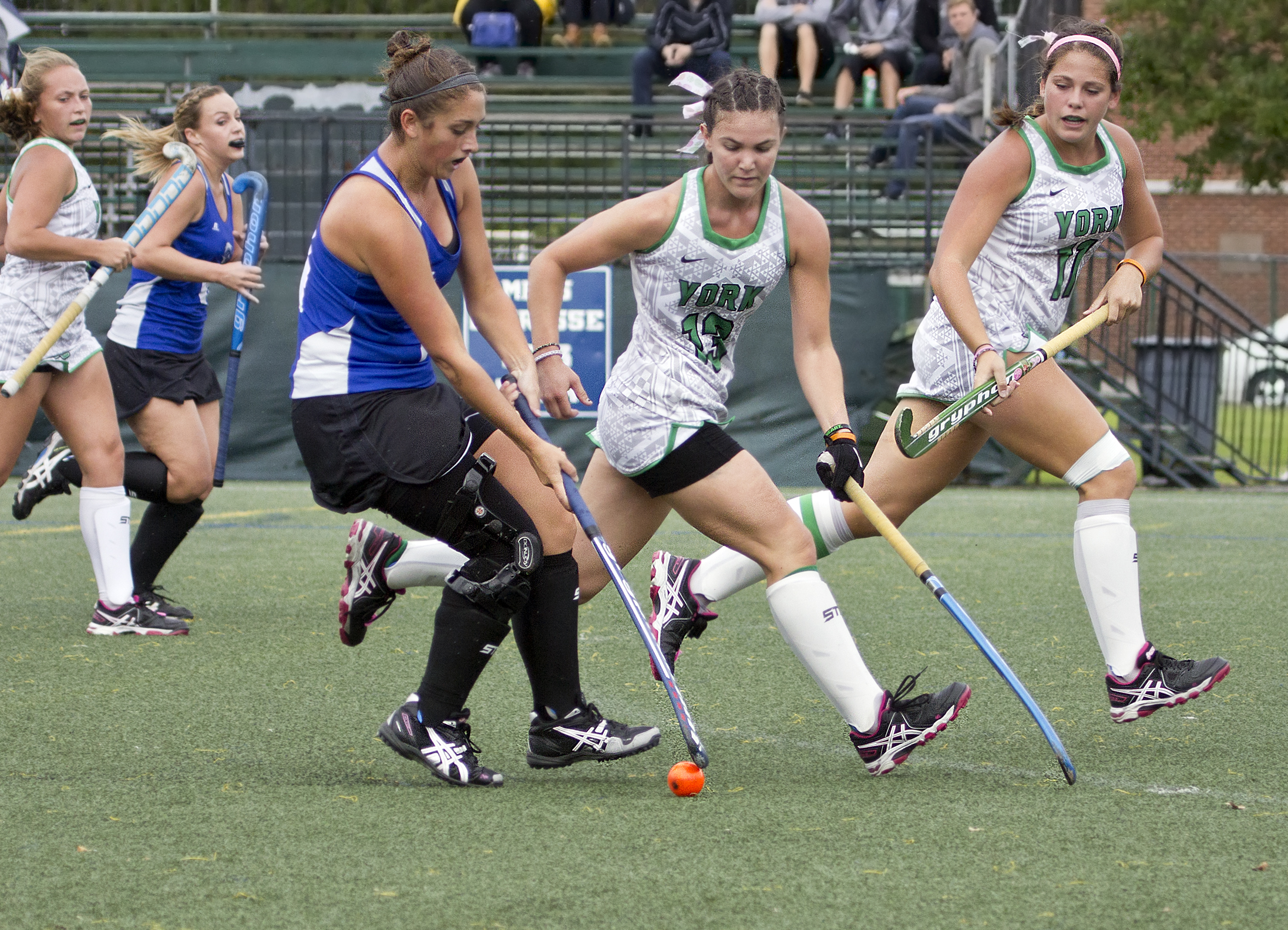
York vs CNU field hockey match in 2015

Though it is true that no school named York College of Pennsylvania has been defeated in football, since the 'tongue-in-cheek' quip references "since 1787" the statement may not be one hundred percent truthful as the school did lose a football game in 1893 (when York Collegiate Institute football team lost a game as reported in The Philadelphia Inquirer. However, the game played that day in 1893 did not allow forward passes nor did the center snap the ball back to a quarterback (as those rules were not adopted until 1905 when John Heisman introduced the rules). Hence, it may be reasonably argued that the game was a form of rugby football and not American football to which the phrase was clearly intended such that a York College T-shirt with the phrase "Undefeated since 1787" is true as York College has never lost an American football game.

The Athletics and Recreation department provides opportunities for students to participate in recreation, athletics and wellness activities. The department is housed in the 170,000 sq ft (16,000 m^{2}) Grumbacher Sport and Fitness Center, which features a three-court field house with elevated indoor jogging track, a gymnasium that seats 1,700 spectators, a natatorium with 12 swimming lanes, a 7,600 sq ft (710 m^{2}) fitness center, a 32-foot (9.8 m) climbing wall, a racquetball court, multiple-purpose rooms and a wrestling room. York College offers 22 varsity sports that compete in the Middle Atlantic Conferences.

== Notable people ==
=== Alumni ===
- Glenn Hetrick (born 1972), makeup artist and judge on the Syfy television competition show Face Off

=== Faculty ===
- Debbie Ricker (born 1965), reproductive biologist and academic administrator
