= Miss Porter's School =

Girls school in Farmington, Connecticut, US

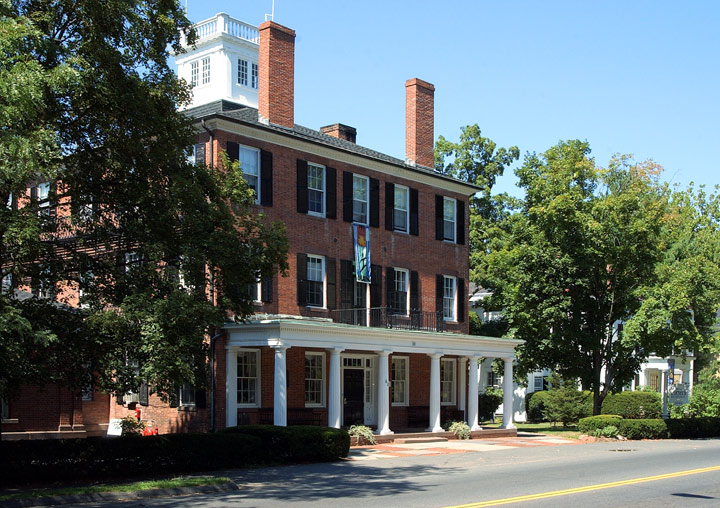

Location
- 60 Main Street; Farmington, Connecticut 06032; United States; 41°43′21″N 72°49′46″W

Information
- Other name: MPS, Porter's, Farmington
- Type: Independent, boarding
- Motto: Latin: PVELLÆ VENERVNT ABIERVNT MVLIERES ("They come as girls; they leave as women.); Latin: VERITATEM SCIENTIAM HVMANITATEM ("Through truth, knowledge; through knowledge, humanity."); Latin: HIC REPPERERVNT ("Let it be made famous.")
- Established: 1843 (183 years ago)
- CEEB code: 070210
- Head teacher: Katherine G. Windsor
- Faculty: 48
- Grades: 9–12
- Gender: Girls
- Enrollment: 350 total 65% boarding (2025–2026)
- Average class size: 12
- Student to teacher ratio: 6:1
- Campus size: 55-acre (22 ha)
- Campus type: Township
- Houses: Minks; Possums; Squirrels
- Colors: Green, White, and Yellow
- Athletics: 18 Interscholastic teams
- Athletics conference: NEPSAC; Founders League
- Mascot: Fighting Daisies
- Team name: Fighting Daisies / Green Wave
- Rival: The Ethel Walker School
- Accreditation: NAIS; MTC; The Association of Boarding Schools (TABS); International Coalition of Girls' Schools (ICGS); OSG
- Newspaper: Salmagundy
- Yearbook: Daeges Eage
- Endowment: $178 million
- Tuition: $76,800 boarding $60,200-day (for 2025–2026)
- Website: porters.org

Miss Porter's School (MPS) is a private boarding and day college-preparatory school for girls founded in 1843 in Farmington, Connecticut. The school draws students from many of the 50 U.S. states, as well as from abroad.

The school's founder, Sarah Porter, insisted on a curriculum which included chemistry, physiology, botany, geology, and astronomy in addition to the more traditional subjects taught in girls' schools. In 1943, Miss Porter's was incorporated as a nonprofit institution and emphasized its purpose as a college preparatory school rather than a finishing school. Also that year, the school ended the tradition of hiring heads of school from the Porter family. The school continued to modernize throughout the 20th century. In July 2008, Katherine Windsor became the head of school. In 2017, the school joined the Mastery Transcript Consortium.

In the 2025–2026 academic year, boarding students comprised 65% of the student body. Students were from 28 countries; of U.S. students, 23 states were represented. The average class size was 12 students.

== History ==
=== Sarah Porter and early years (1843–1884) ===
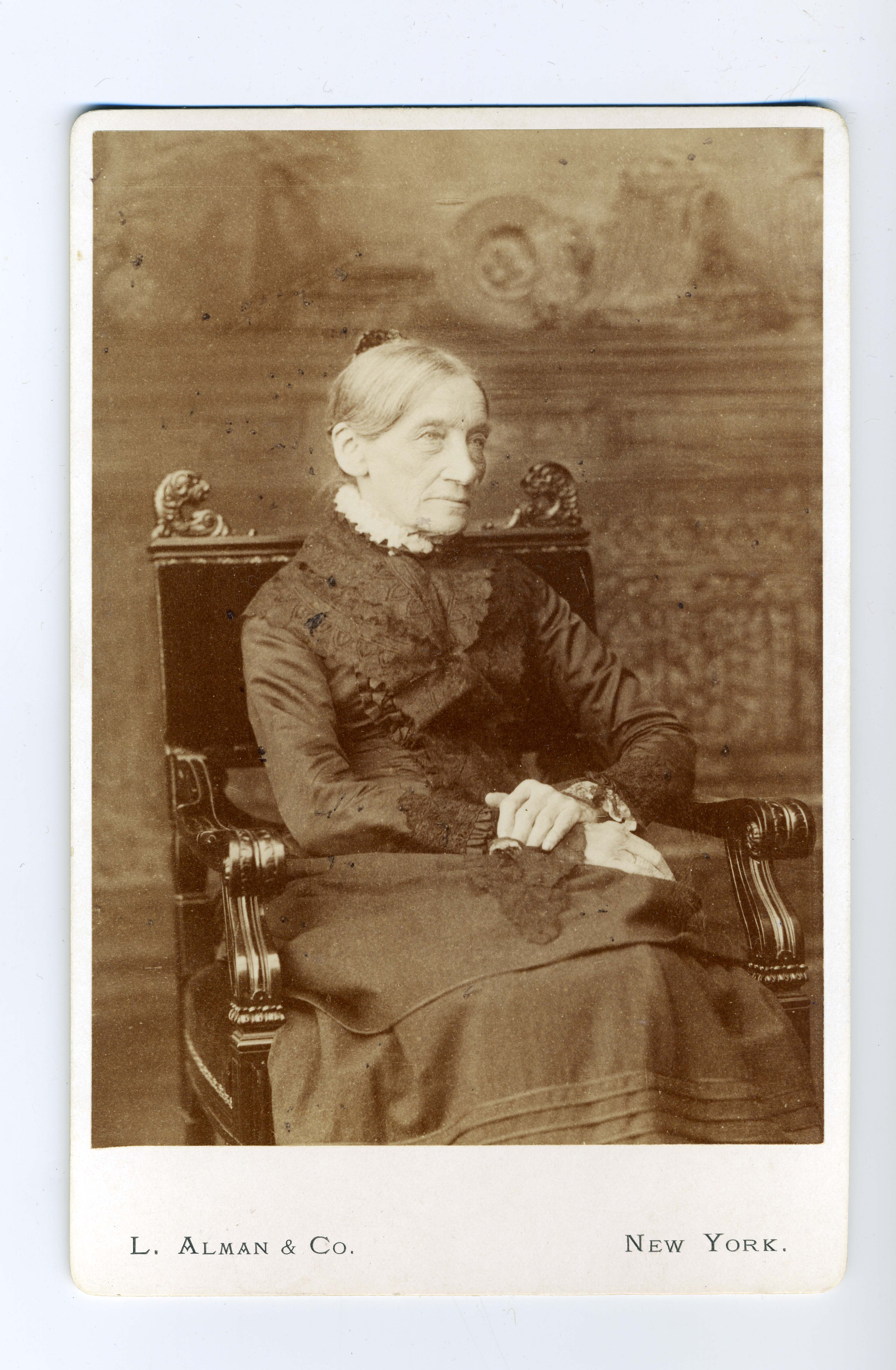
An 1888 cabinet card of Sarah Porter, the founder of Miss Porter's School

Miss Porter's School was established in 1843 by education reformer Sarah Porter in her hometown of Farmington as a way to become financially independent. However, Porter "earned so little that her students had to board in her parents' home" and in 1845, she moved to Buffalo to run another school. She reopened her school in Farmington in 1847. In the book Where Girls Come First: The Rise, Fall, and Surprising Revival of Girls' Schools, Lana DeBare states that Miss Porter's School was established before women's colleges became widespread and before finishing schools emerged as a substitute for higher education. Darlene Reeve (née Stevens), who attended the school in the 1870s, in a retrospective wrote that "in the East, people used to say: 'Send your girls to Miss Porter or to College'". The school's curriculum was influenced by Yale University; Porter had studied privately at Yale and her brother, Noah Porter, was President of Yale College from 1871 to 1886. The school initially did not issue diplomas; Porter instead gave the students a recommendation.

Porter was insistent that the curriculum extend beyond the traditional subjects taught in girls' schools to include both a broad liberal arts education, such as arithmetic, algebra, English literature, French, history, and classical languages, and natural sciences including chemistry, physiology, botany, geology, astronomy, and zoology; advanced students could also study subjects such as Greek, Latin, logic, mental and moral philosophy, and German. She "rejected academic requirements, examinations, and grades; all classes and subjects were electives". Porter's educational philosophy of "culture" defined learning as a secular form of spiritual and intellectual growth intended to foster a lifetime of self-development through the study of nature and the liberal arts. This approach aimed to prepare women for influential roles within the domestic sphere. Porter opposed women's colleges and "discouraged her students from attending college". Academic Louise Stevenson explained that Porter hired "distinguished" male academics as teachers and invited lecturers from Hartford and New Haven; however, for female teachers, Porter looked for those "who exemplified true piety" rather than academics. She also did not hire women who were college-educated – in a 1883 letter, Porter wrote "I do not want one college trained woman—they are narrow, arrogant—and do not infuse the spirit which I want".

Historian Barbara Sicherman wrote that "despite a strong intellectual bent, Miss Porter–a devout Congregationalist–encouraged the acquisition of Christian character, liberal culture, and disciplined womanhood rather than learning for its own sake or preparation for a career. [...] But if the school did not promote intellectual rigor, neither did it tolerate snobbishness or frivolity". Academic Andrea Hamilton, comparing early Miss Porter's to Bryn Mawr School, stated Miss Porter's had many "'finishing school' characteristics" and its founder "devoted her school to developing culture and character in its students". Edith Hamilton, who attended Miss Porter's for three years starting in 1883, criticized the quality of her education at the school. Her sister Alice Hamilton stated that, while she loved the school, "some of the teaching we received was the world's worst". Other students praised their time at Farmington, including their tutelage under Porter. Reeve wrote that Porter's "classes were a revelation of her cultural background and exhaustless fund of information on every subject". Stevenson wrote that the "cultural education" at Miss Porter's "grew from reaction to evangelical activism" and some students, such as Alice Hamilton, "moved from lessons of culture to social reform activities typical of the late nineteenth century". She argued that a "significant number" of alumnae remained unmarried which "suggests the lessons of culture were not invariably persuasive" and "some students concluded that usefulness might lie outside of marriage and homelife".

=== Leadership transitions and Keep family stewardship (1884–1943) ===
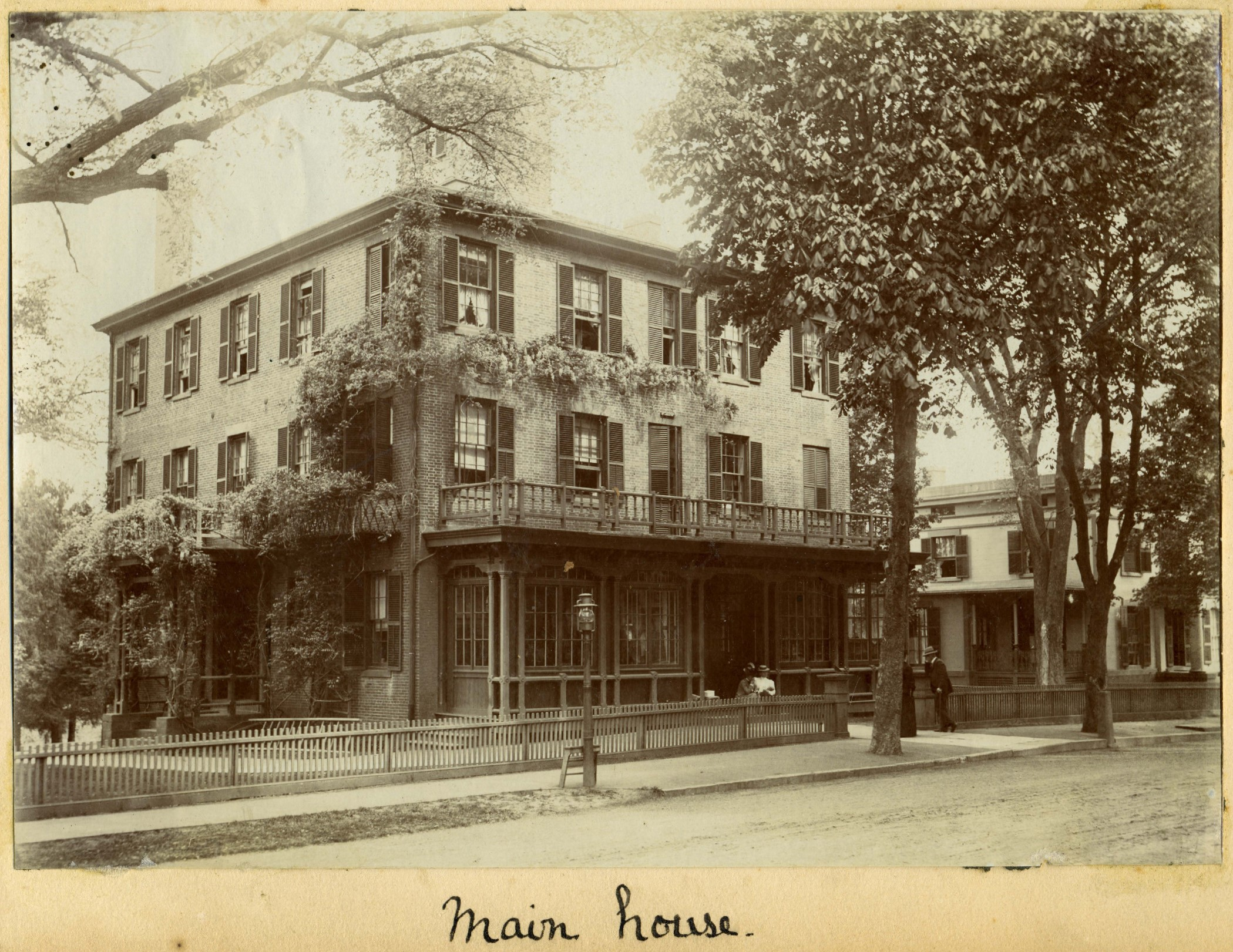
Miss Porter's Main House in 1899

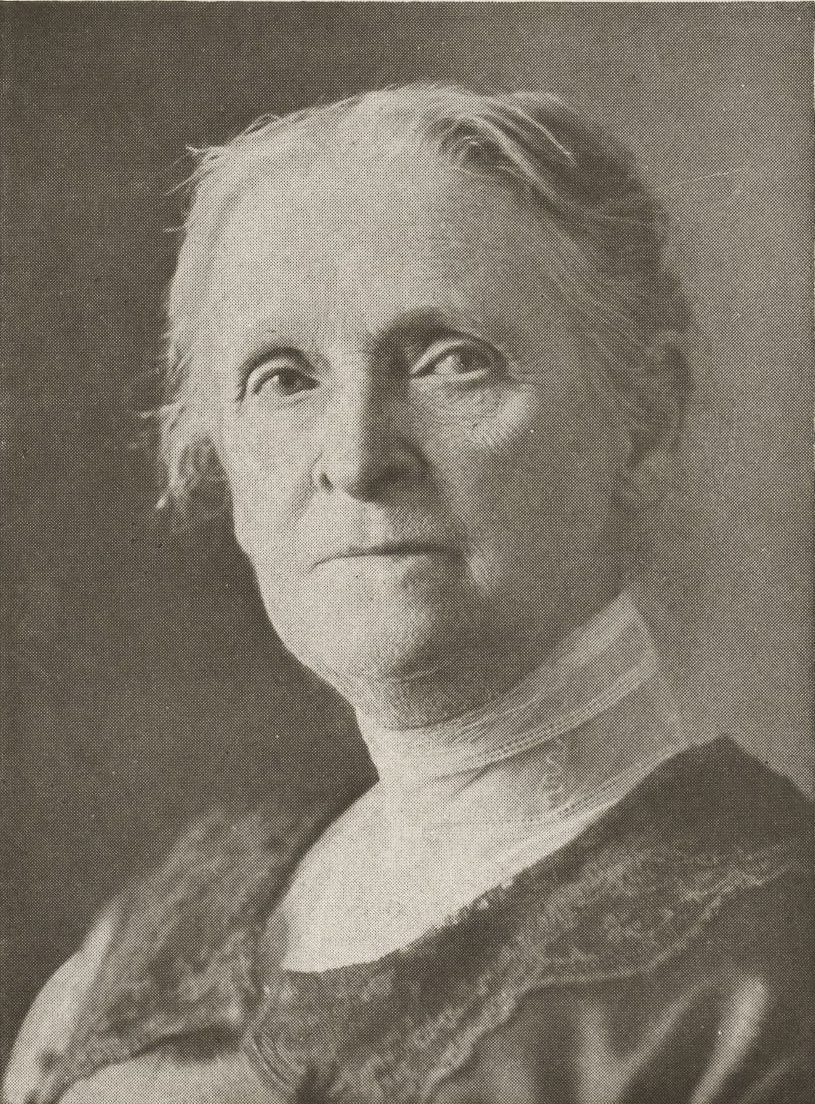
Mary Elizabeth Dunning Dow in 1920

In 1884, Sarah Porter hired her former student, Mary Elizabeth Dunning Dow, with whom she began to share more of her duties as head of school. In 1885, Dow succeeded the school's founder after Porter retired from daily oversight. Academic Deborah Smith wrote that "Porter's name remained a marketable commodity and continued to appear in printed announcements about school matters, which referred to management as 'Miss Porter and Mrs. Dow'". Historian Victoria Houseman wrote that during Edith Hamilton's time at the school in the late 1880s, while Dow was managing it, "Porter's powerful personality still set the tone of the school".

Sarah Porter died in 1900; Dow remained as the head of school. A 1903 editorial in The Independent stated that "the distinctive life of the school has continued unbroken under" Dow and opined that Miss Porter's School as an institution was increasingly seen as "standing apart" and "sufficient unto itself", largely unconcerned with the "requirements of a modern education". While acknowledging that some graduates might be lacking by "certain standards", it argued that they gained what "mere standards can never give": "ideals of the meaning of life", cultural appreciation, refinement, and "love for the place and the traditions".

Porter's will named her nephew, Robert Porter Keep, as executor of her estate, of which the school was the most valuable asset. Dow's compensation for her position as sole head of school was also specified in the will. As executor, Robert Keep began extensive repairs and renovations to the school. While Dow continued to receive a salary as stipulated in Porter's will, she became convinced that Keep, in diverting the school's income to pay for construction, was enriching his inheritance with funds that were rightfully hers. The conflict escalated and culminated in Dow's resignation in 1903. When Dow moved to Briarcliff, New York and founded Mrs. Dow's School for Girls, all but three of Miss Porter's teachers went with her; as many as 140 students also switched schools. On the split between Keep and Dow, The Independent commented "how different might have been the story had Miss Porter realized that her school had grown into an institution" and left control of the school to a group of trustees instead of to an individual.

Robert Keep announced in July 1903 that the school would reopen in October 1903 with his wife, Elizabeth Vashti Hale Keep, as head of school, 11 teachers, and between five and 16 students in attendance. After Keep died on July 3, 1904, Elizabeth Keep continued to work there. One of her many legacies was a kindergarten for children of employees. Also in 1904, the Keeps rejected an offer on the school by former students.

Between 1910 and 1916, college preparation was "briefly available". The Outlook reported that Miss Porter's under Elizabeth Keep attained "a somewhat unusual position among secondary schools for girls. Its beautiful physical situation, its methods, its grouping of the girls in separate houses about a central building, gave it some of the atmosphere and influence of a kind of college midway between the preparatory school and the more elaborate institutions of academie [sic] training for women". By 1917, Miss Porter's issued "diplomas for those who earned credits beyond those required for high school graduation". When Elizabeth Keep died in 1917, leadership of the school passed to her stepson, Robert Porter Keep, Jr., a German teacher at Phillips Academy. From 1917 until the school's centennial celebrations in 1943, he and his wife remained heads of school at Miss Porter's.

=== Modernization and growth (1943–2000) ===
The school was incorporated as a nonprofit institution in 1943, emphasizing its purpose as a college preparatory school rather than a finishing school. The New York Times stated that the school's "big changeover, from the epitome of the finishing school to strict college preparatory, came in the mid‐1940's" and of the finishing schools which took that leap, "Miss Porter's had to jump what was probably the farthest distance". Also in 1943, the school ended the tradition of hiring heads of school from the Porter family, instead selecting Ward Lamb Johnson and his wife Katharine. Johnson had been the headmaster of the Lawrence School for 22 years when he and his wife joined the Farmington community in 1943. He retired 11 years later. During their tenure, Leila Dilworth Jones '44 Memorial Library was opened. They also increased faculty housing.

Mary Norris (née Frick) French and her husband Hollis Stratton French served as co-principals of the school from 1954 to 1966.

In 1966, then headmaster of the Buffalo Seminary Richard W. Davis was selected to be headmaster at Miss Porter's. He was to free the school of its "reputation of being too restrictive and too conservative." His appointment marked the first time in a half-century that the school would be directed by one person instead of a couple. Reflecting on his tenure at the school, Davis recalled, "We no longer required that girls wear head coverings in bad weather. We allowed pants to be worn, neat ones, to classes, but not to the dining room. We gradually dropped the requirement that all meals were 'sit-down', with assigned seating. The changes did not come all at once, yet each one brought some dissent. Certain faculty members felt that standards were slipping."

Having arrived in Farmington in 1967, also from the Buffalo Seminary (like Davis), Warren 'Skip' Hance quickly took on administrative roles in addition to teaching history. First he was department chair and then director of development. There followed the appointment to be assistant headmaster, and then to be the ninth head of Miss Porter's School.

Immediately prior to her service as Miss Porter's head of school, Rachel Phillips Belash had been vice president at First National Bank of Boston. A native of Wales, an accomplished cellist, and holding a PhD in Spanish literature, Belash was inaugurated 10th head of Miss Porter's School for a term beginning in 1983. Her appointment came during a period when the number of headmistresses at independent schools was declining, and it was considered "a welcome departure" from that trend. Belash was devoted to renewing single-sex education for girls and spoke widely on the topic, as well as writing for The New York Times. One report called her a "visionary".

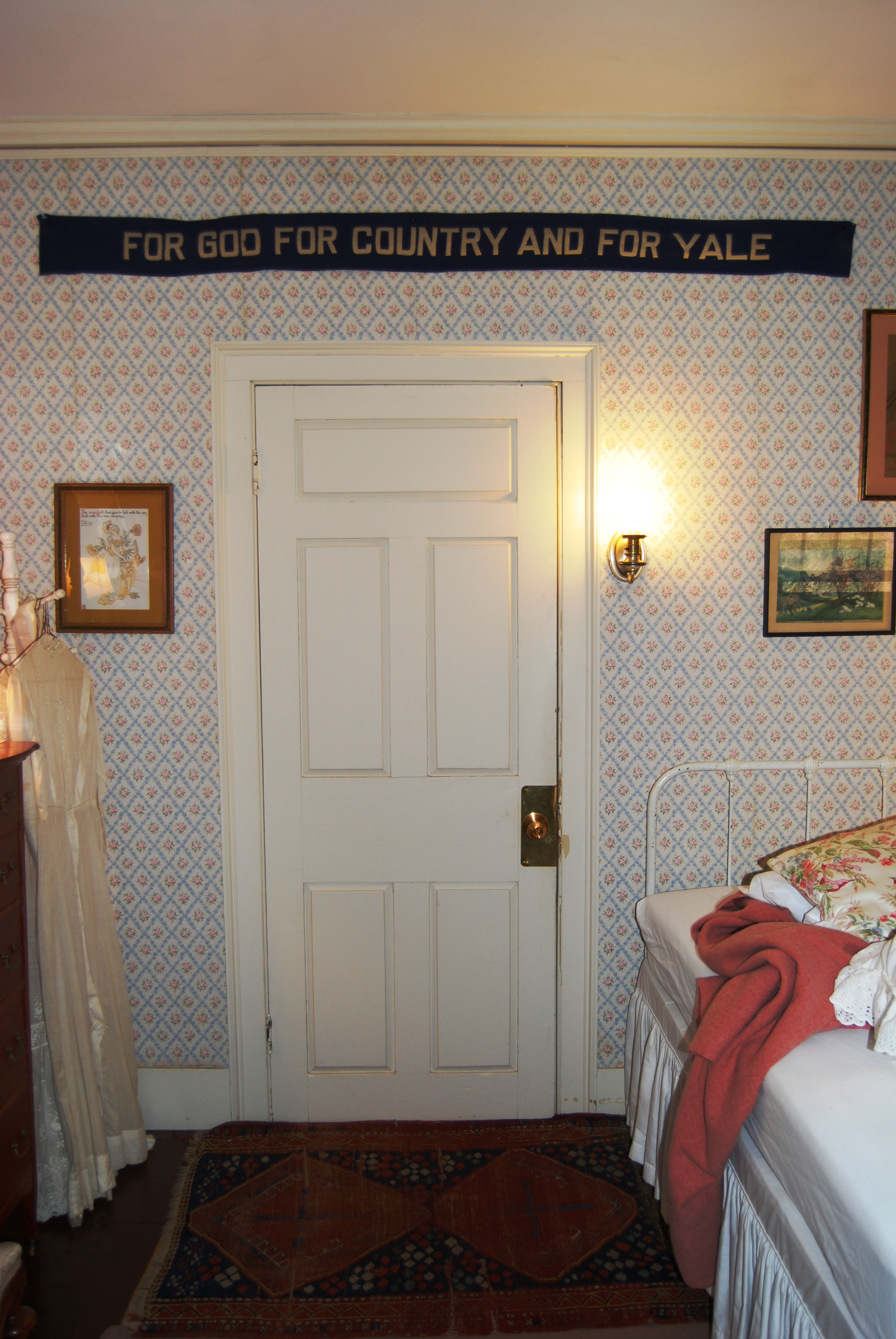
A banner hanging in a themed guest room in the Timothy Cowles House, at Miss Porter's School, gives insight into how Porter's girls lived during the mid-1900s.

In July 1992, Marianna "Muffin" Mead O'Brien began her term as head of school, following Belash's abrupt resignation at the end of June, and having served the school in years prior on the board of trustees from 1976 to 1983, and, respectively, as parent to three alumnae. Drawing on her experience of 25 years at the Groton School, during which she had "helped start the coeducation program, taught history, tutored reading, and was in the human relations and sexuality counseling faculty," O'Brien served a one-year term between the Belash and Ford administrations.

M. Burch Tracy Ford was dean of students at Milton Academy and a residential counselor at the Groton School before coming to Miss Porter's. In 1994, she wrote in a letter to the editor of The New York Times, that "Coed classrooms are the norm, but the norm does not serve girls well; it needs to be challenged, and ultimately changed. Single-sex education is counterculture, but it's good for girls." In the 1990s, the campus underwent multiple expansion projects to add new academic buildings.

=== 21st-century developments (2000–present) ===
In 2002, Ford oversaw the launch of the Oprah Winfrey Endowed Scholarship Fund at Miss Porter's, offered through the Oprah Winfrey Charitable Foundation.

The head of school has been Katherine Windsor since July 2008. Windsor previously ran the Center for Talented Youth program at Johns Hopkins University and the Sage School in Foxborough, Massachusetts. Her tenure as head of school has seen the school instantiate its partnership with the University of Pennsylvania Graduate School of Education's Independent School Teaching Residency program. Late in 2008 the school became the target of a lawsuit dealing over allegations of negligent and intentional infliction of emotional distress brought on by student harassment and bullying.

In 2017, Miss Porter's joined the Mastery Transcript Consortium which emphasizes competency-based learning over the traditional Grade Point Average system. In the 2020s, the school changed its academic term from a semester system to a trimester system. In late May 2020, due to the COVID-19 pandemic, Windsor presided over virtual graduation exercises. The school returned to in-person learning in August 2020.

== Finances ==
=== Tuition and financial aid ===
In 1973, The New York Times reported that Miss Porter's was "one of the most expensive of the prep schools" with its tuition at $4,200; 15% "of the student body is on scholarship, in a few instances with all expenses paid". In 1983, the boarding tuition was $9,500 while the day tuition was $6,200; 18% of its students received financial aid. In 1995, the boarding tuition was $19,750 while the day tuition was $13,750. In 2004, Mary Ann Zehr of Education Week noted that Miss Porter's was among the schools "charging at least $25,000" for day students. Zehr explained that, per "data collected by the National Association of Independent Schools", the trend of increasing tuition "beyond the rate of inflation" at independent schools began in the late 1980s, and that independent school tuition has increased "by 3 or 4 percentage points above inflation each year" over the last ten years.

In the 2016–2017 academic year, the boarding tuition was $56,700 while the day tuition was $45,660. In 2019, Miss Porter's was No. 33 on Business Insider's "50 most expensive top boarding schools in America" list. The tuition for boarding students was valued at $66,825 for 2021–22, plus other mandatory and optional fees. In the 2025–2026 academic year, the boarding tuition was $76,800 while the day tuition was $60,200.

Miss Porter's offers need-based financial aid. In 2016–2017, the school reported that 34% of its students received financial aid. The school stated that 44% of its students received financial aid in the 2025–2026 academic year.

=== Endowment ===
A 1988–1994 "capital campaign exceeded its projected $20 million goal by $1.6 million" which "raised the total endowment to $32 million". In 1996, The Christian Science Monitor reported this endowment was "the highest among all-girls' schools". In 2016, the school's endowment was estimated at $106 million. In June 2025, Miss Porter's reported their endowment was $178 million.

The Dorothy Walker Bush 1919 Fund was established in 1994 in her memory by family and friends to bring speakers to the school who address religion, spirituality, and faith. The Emily Brown Fritzinger '59 Music Fund was established by her parents, Mr. and Mrs. Gardner Brown (Elizabeth Smith 1928), family, and friends; the fund supports musical performances on campus and occasional trips to New York City for all students and faculty to attend a live performance. The Elisabeth S. Hadden '76 Memorial Fund was established in 1976 in her memory by family and friends to support the annual Haggis Baggis poetry reading. The Kalat Fund for National and International Resources was established by Virginia Lowry Kalat '39, in honor of her 45th Reunion. The Geri Mullis '69 Memorial Poetry Fund was established in 1994 by the members of the Class of 1969 in honor of their 25th Reunion to bring a guest artist to campus. The Prescott Program Fund was established in 1961 by Marjorie Wiggin Prescott (class of 1911) to bring distinguished visiting lecturers and performers to the School. The Suzannah Ryan Wilkie '53 and Janet Norton Bilkey '53 "Wilkie-Bilkey" Program was established in 1988 by the Class of 1953 in honor of their 35th Reunion to support an annual performance from the world of dance or drama or other live performance. The Oprah Winfrey Endowed Scholarship Fund, offered through the Oprah Winfrey Foundation, provides financial aid to students based on academic performance and leadership. One scholarship beneficiary presented her benefactor with the Jean Hersholt Humanitarian Award at the 2011 Governors Awards hosted by the Academy of Motion Picture Arts and Sciences.

== Campus ==
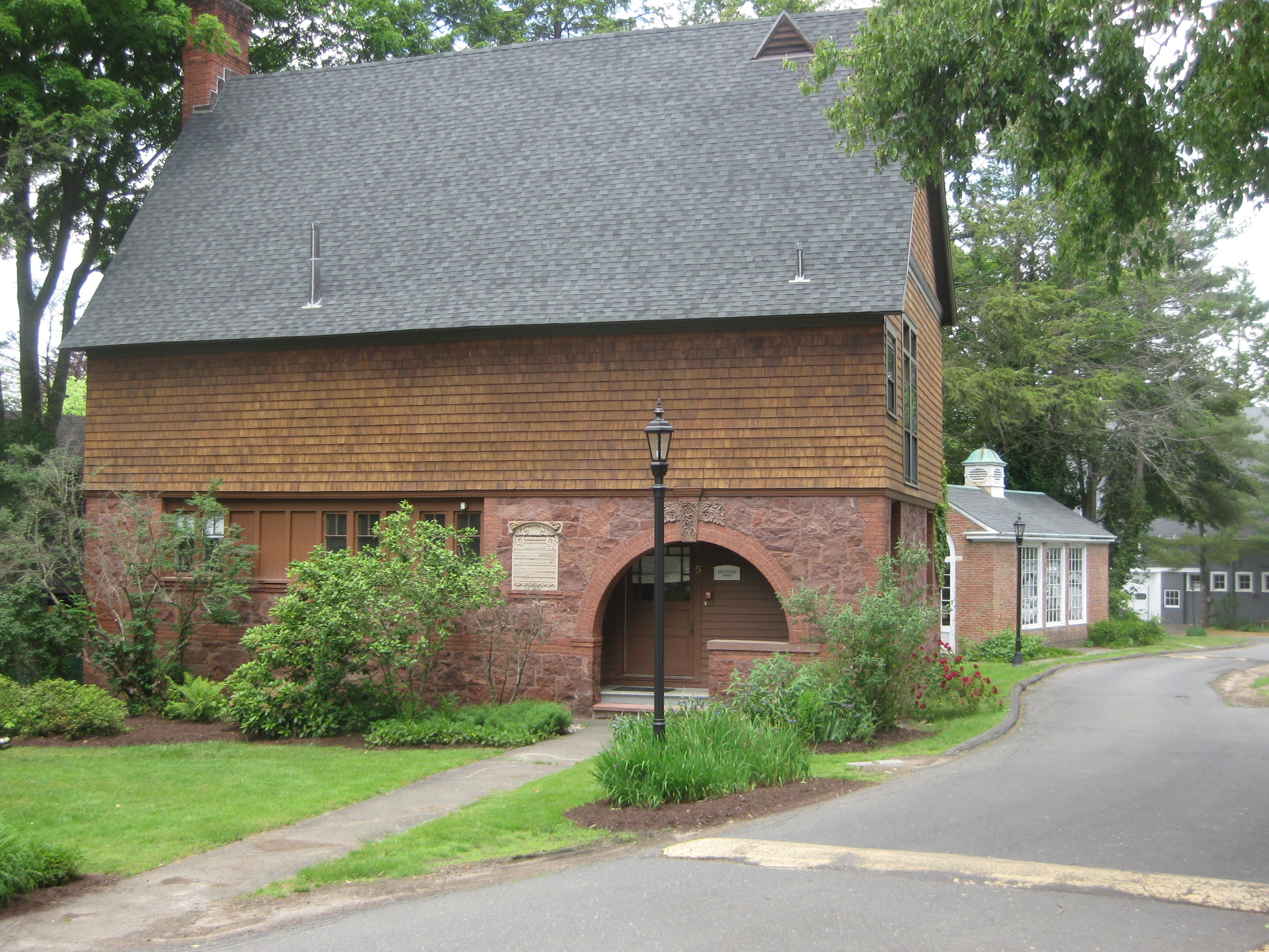
Studio Building at Miss Porter's School

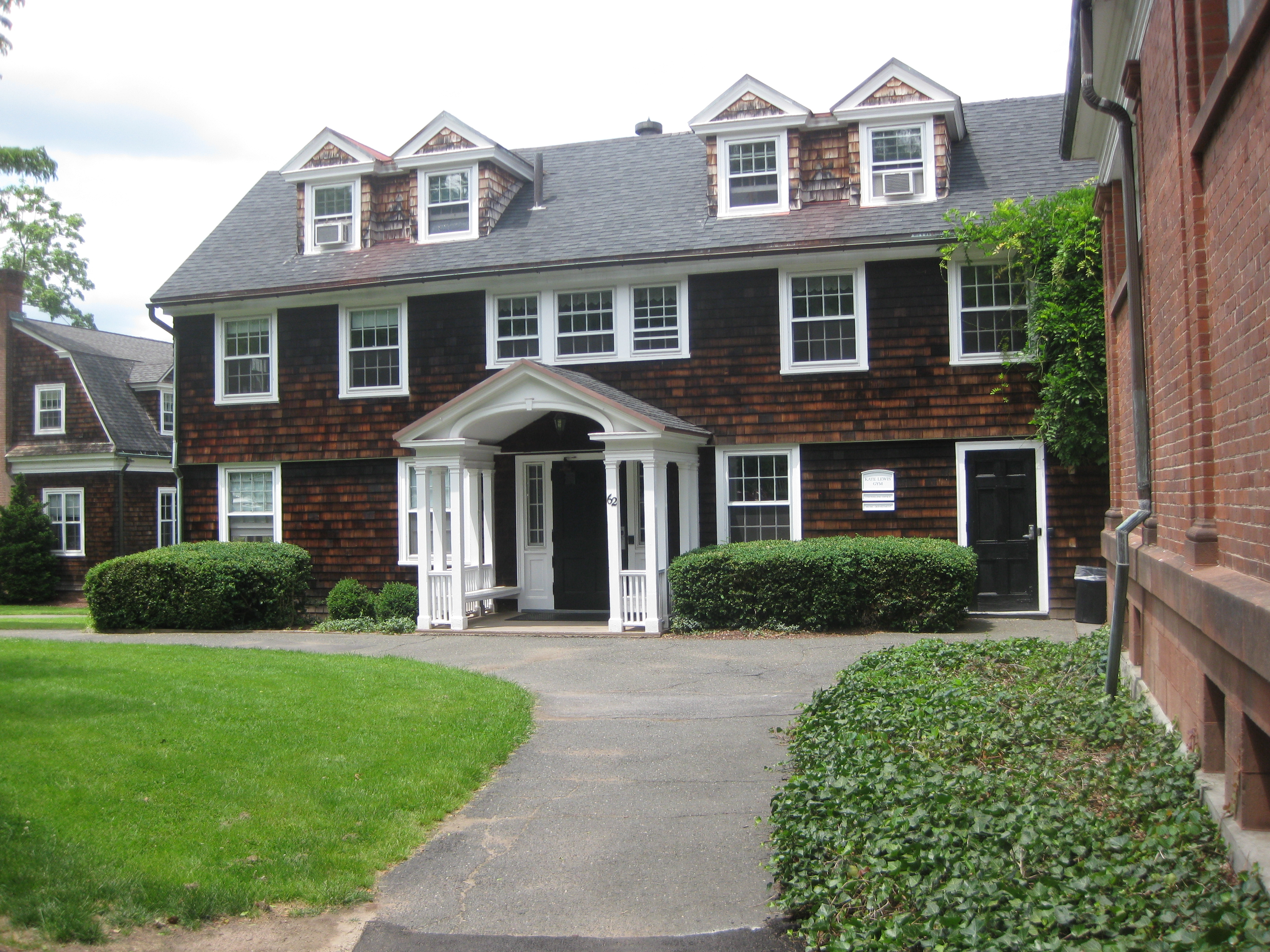
The Dr. Glenda Newell-Harris '71 Student Center, previously known as the Kate Lewis Gym

The 40-acre campus overlooking the Farmington River includes buildings with historical significance, and the school has changed to meet needs over the years. A 2022 campus map includes thirty buildings.

=== Academic facilities ===
- Main House, originally built in 1830 as the Union Hotel, this building became part of the school in 1848 and now serves as the central hub for student life, dining, and administration. Its front door is depicted on the school's official seal. This building underwent a major renovation and expansion project which was completed in 2021.
- M. Burch Tracy Ford Library houses an over 22,000-volume general collection as well as digital archives.
- Ann Whitney Olin Arts and Science Center is the main building for mathematics, science, and arts. Studio art labs include a painting and ceramics studio, each with 25-foot (7.6 m) ceilings and 500-square-foot (46 m^{2}) of windows, as separated, respectively, by a textiles lab and a digital media lab, while the lower level of the facility counts as home to the department's photography classroom and darkroom. The renovation and expansion of this building was designed by Tai Soo Kim. In 2018, to support the school's "Technology, Innovation and Entrepreneurship" curriculum, an "Innovation Lab" with "3D printers, laser cutters, tools and machines" was added to this building.

=== Athletic facilities ===
- The Colgate Wellness Center, situated on the west side of Main Street just south of Porter Road, is an eight-bed licensed infirmary, wholly Ancient-run in its medical and counseling capacities. It has been remodeled to extend the space and ease student access; known to generations past as Erastus Gay House, or Little Gay for its proximity and size relative to the Julius Gay House.
- The Student Recreation Center, designed by Tai Soo Kim and built in 1991, includes the Wean Student Center and Crisp Gymnasium.
- The Mellon Gymnasium was designed by Maxwell Moore and built in 1962 as part of the theater-gymnasium complex.
- The Gaines Dance Barn, known to generations past as the Play Barn, built ca. 1941 and remodeled in 1993, is the 3,500-square-foot (330 m^{2}) facility, ostensibly located at 64 Main Street, and which serves as both rehearsal and performance space for dance groups. In March 1998, the facility was acoustically treated following complications stemming from the 1993 remodel; the space then underwent a partial expansion in 2020.
- The Pool & Squash Building features a 25-yard, eight-lane ceramic-tile competition pool and eight regulation squash courts. The pool was built into the hillside, thereby reducing the impression of its height and using sloped roof lines.
- The Farmington Boat House is home to the school's crew program; shared, and duly maintained, in a unique public-private partnership with Friends of Farmington Crew.
- Kiki's Field (NCAA regulation synthetic turf) and Maple Field (NFHS synthetic turf) are home to both the school's soccer and lacrosse teams; located at 147 Garden Street, together with Cow Barn Field, which itself is home to the school's softball team.
- Oaklea Field (full NCAA regulation synthetic turf) is home to the school's field hockey and ultimate teams, located at 10 Mountain Road.

== Residential culture and student life ==
=== Student body ===
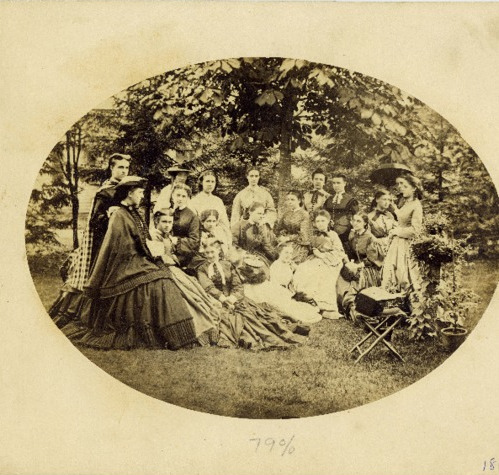
Sarah Porter and students in a garden in 1867; Porter is on far left in rear row wearing a hat

In 1843, Sarah Porter began her girls school with 18 students. When Porter reopened her school in 1847, she had a mixture of approximately thirty day and boarding students. Academic Louise Stevenson explained that "family connections and religious background more than economic or social rank determined who applied to the school" during the 1850s–1860s; "students came from Congregationalist and Presbyterian families from New England or areas of New England settlement–the growing cities of central and western New York, Indiana, Illinois, and Iowa". In 1895, the Daily Norwalk Gazette reported that the school could accommodate up to 125 students.

In 1968, the school admitted its first black student. In 1973, Davis stated the school was increasing its recruitment efforts of black students. Miss Porter's also began to expand its day student enrollment. In 1973, "37 out of a total enrollment of 266" were day students. In 1991, the Sun Sentinel and The New York Times reported on the decrease in enrollment at independent and boarding schools across the United States; the National Association of Independent Schools stated that since 1981, "boarding-school enrollment has dropped about 10 percent" leading to "all schools" becoming "more aggressive in their marketing efforts". Miss Porter's had 198 students enrolled that year. The school increased recruitment in Japan, Hong Kong and South Korea; academic dean Gregory Ventre explained that it was an "attempt to get serious students who can afford us and to diversify our student body". In the "Winter 1996/1997" issue, The Journal of Blacks in Higher Education stated that Miss Porter's had gone from being "the last of the elite schools to graduate a black student" in 1971 to having, among high-ranking boarding schools, "the highest percentage of black faculty" at 19% and "the second highest percentage of black student enrollments" at 8.9%. In 1999, the journal reported Miss Porter's had "the highest percentage of black students" at 9.2%.

In 2000, The New York Times reported that students seeking enrollment at Connecticut's private high schools had increased, leading schools to become more selective because of limited capacity. At Miss Porter's, there were an "estimated 350 applications" for its "64 freshman seats". Admissions director Rebecca Ballard stated the school has a "huge commitment to having a balanced student body"; "18 percent of the students are minorities and 11 percent are from outside the United States". In the 2016–2017 academic year, enrollment was 325 with 212 boarders and 113-day students. In 2025, Town & Country noted that Miss Porter's was among "the most prominent" girls' schools that accepted applicants who identify as girls and allowed continued enrollment for students who transition. In the 2025–2026 academic year, enrollment was 350 with 65% of the student body as boarders.

=== Residential life ===
Sarah Porter's initial students lived with her in her parent's home in Farmington. The school expanded and by 1854, students either lived with Porter in a hotel she had purchased or across the street in a rented house, "dubbed 'the colonies'", supervised by younger teachers. In 2005, Miss Porter's had nine dormitories under the supervision of dedicated housing directors; many are converted former homes.

The community traditionally denotes those new to campus collectively as "New Girls", those returning members as "Old Girls", and alumn as "Ancients". Porter's also has various school traditions the students partake in. In 1902, Ancient Theodate Pope Riddle outfitted a section of her family's homestead on nearby Mountain Road with a shop and tearoom, called the Odd and End shop which was also known as the Gundy, which served Miss Porter's students. During Jacqueline Kennedy Onassis's time at school, the Gundy was the only off-campus place students could visit. The Gundy was closed in 1964.

=== Clubs, sports, and organizations ===
The school claims to have over fifty active student-run clubs and organizations.

==== Athletics ====
Porter's traditional rival is The Ethel Walker School, against which it competes as a member of the Founders League, and, to a lesser extent, the likes of fellow founding members Choate Rosemary Hall, Hotchkiss, Kent, Kingswood-Oxford, Loomis Chaffee, Taft and Westminster. At the end of each season, Porter's competes against the league's most competitive teams in the New England Championships. The school has no mascot, although some call the teams Fighting Daisies.

In the 1800s, the school encouraged athletic opportunities, such as tennis and horseback riding. In 1867, the school formed its own baseball team, the Tunxises, named after the Saukiog tribe who once settled the area on which the school is situated.

In the late 1980s, Miss Porter's ended a short-lived period of membership in the Founders League after consistently ranking "at the bottom of the standing"; however, under the tenure of Burch Ford, the school rejoined the league in the late 1990s and became "one of the most competitive in New England". In 1998, The New York Times reported that Ford, as the new head of school, decided "to build a strong, competitive program for its 15 interscholastic sports" but she ran "into some resistance among coaches and faculty who do not appreciate the new emphasis or some methods used to push girls to win". Since the turn of the millennium, student athletes have earned a combined 12 Founder's League and eight New England championship titles. In 2019, The Boston Globe obituary for Ford highlighted her work in improving the competitive nature of the school's athletic program and the increase in Division I college recruitment under her tenure.

==== Student publications ====
The following organizational boards sustain each of the school's publications:

- Salmagundy, established October 27, 1945, is the school's student-run online monthly newspaper.
- The school's journal for scholarly writing, Chautauqua, shares its name with the US adult education movement. It publishes student research across a variety of academic disciplines.
- The school's yearbook is called Daeges Eage, Old English for "day's eye".
- Haggis/Baggis is the school's magazine for literature and fine arts, featuring student poems, short stories, photographs, and artwork. It was first published in 1967. The Spring 1984 issue featured writing by a number of outside authors, solicited earlier in 1984 by the magazine's editors to discuss their respective visions for the year 2020, notably Ray Bradbury and then–Vice President George H. W. Bush.
- The Language Literary Magazine is a yearly publication which showcases work by students of foreign languages.

== Archives and special collections ==
As one of the oldest independent schools with archival holdings, the school is particularly significant for research. Sarah Porter's Rule Book is in the holdings, as well as many letters, including those sent to her mother and sisters when she made her first visit to Europe in 1872 at the age of fifty-nine.

== Notable faculty ==
- Robert Bolling Brandegee, art teacher
- Carlo Buonamici, music teacher
- Theodore Thomas, music teacher

== In popular culture ==
- In the television show Buffy the Vampire Slayer, when Buffy's mother thinks it would be best to send Buffy away to school, she picks up an application to Miss Porter's.
- In the musical Rent, one of the leads, Harvard-educated lawyer Joanne Jefferson, attended and learned to tango with the French ambassador's daughter in her dorm room at Miss Porter's.
- In the novel Betrayed by P.C. and Kristin Cast, Zoey finds Miss Porter's after researching different "private preparatory schools" to find examples of good student councils to model her own new Dark Daughters' council after.
- The novel The New Girls (1979), by Beth Gutcheon, is set in a school called Miss Pratt's based on Miss Porter's.
- On the AMC television series Mad Men (2007–2015), Sally Draper completes an interview and overnight stay at Miss Porter's in the sixth-season episode titled "The Quality of Mercy." Later episodes highlight Sally's adventures at school.
