= Carol Hurd Green =

American scholar, author, and editor (1935–2025)

- Born: January 1, 1935; Cambridge, Massachusetts, U.S.
- Died: October 23, 2025 (aged 90); Cambridge, Massachusetts, U.S.
- Occupations: Scholar, author, editor, program director, educator

Academic background
- Education: Georgetown University
- Alma mater: George Washington University

Academic work
- Discipline: American studies
- Institutions: Boston College
- Main interests: Women's biographies
- Notable works: Notable American Women: The Modern Period; American Women in the 1960s: Changing the Future; American Women Writers: A Critical Reference Guide from Colonial Times to the Present

Carol Hurd Green (January 1935 – October 23, 2025) was an American scholar, author, and editor, including of women's biography collections. Green was the director of the Donovan Urban Teaching Scholars Program and faculty member in the Lynch School of Education and Human Development.

== Early life and education ==
Green was born in 1935 in Cambridge, Massachusetts and attended Regis College for her BA. She completed an MA at Georgetown University in 1960 and her PhD in American Studies at George Washington University in 1971.

== Career ==
Green began her teaching career as an English instructor at the College of Notre Dame in Maryland from 1959 to 1963, and then became an assistant professor at Merrimack College from 1963 to 1964. She was an instructor at Boston College from 1964 to 1970, and then taught at Newton College and Radcliffe College before she became the Associate Dean of the College of Art and Sciences at Boston College in 1981.

Green was the director of the Donovan Urban Teaching Scholars Program in the Lynch School of Education and Human Development. She continued as a member of the faculty after retiring from her role as associate dean. While she was the associate dean, Green won a Fulbright grant in 1996 to support her travel for a visiting professorship at the University of Palacky in the Czech Republic.

Green has co-edited Notable American Women: The Modern Period, a collection of modern biographies that continues the collection in Notable American Women, 1607–1950, and the biographical collection American Women Writers: A Critical Reference Guide from Colonial Times to the Present. She is also the co-author of American Women in the 1960s: Changing the Future.

Green died on October 23, 2025, at the age of 90.

=== Notable American Women: The Modern Period ===
Green and Barbara Sicherman co-edited Notable American Women: The Modern Period. A Biographical Dictionary, a collection of biographies of women who died between 1951 and 1975, that was published in 1980 by The Belknap Press of Harvard University Press and follows Notable American Women, 1607–1950, also published by The Belknap Press. Green's contribution as an author includes the entry for Ethel Greenglass Rosenberg.

According to a review by Sheila M. Rothman in Reviews in American History, "In the end, for all the celebration and effort to establish role models and give instructions on combining public and private lives, the theme that pervades the volume remains the massive discrimination that women suffered. No matter how accomplished they might be, how impressive their credentials or innovative their child-rearing strategies, all of them confronted barriers which limited their accomplishments." A review by Valerie Miner in the Christian Science Monitor states, "the editors have reached far beyond classic references to discover women from differing ethnic, economic, and regional backgrounds. Some of these more hidden stories are the highlights of the book."

=== American Women in the 1960s: Changing the Future ===
Green and Blanche Linden-Ward co-authored American Women in the 1960s: Changing the Future, which was published by MacMillan in 1993. In a review for The American Historical Review, Jane Sherron De Hart writes that Green and Linden-Ward have "mixed success" in their attempt to address various challenges presented by the premise of the volume, including in how "causation and implications of major developments seldom confine themselves to neat ten-year intervals", and "the very term "sixties" constitutes a cultural and political litmus test that almost invariably colors analysis". In a review for The Journal of American History, Susan M. Hartmann writes, "While documenting women's involvement in both mainstream and radical movements, they also present convincing evidence that the 1960s brought little change for most women. Rather, they emphasize that small currents of opportunity began to gather strength, preparing the way for the more substantial transformations in gender roles and relationships of the 1970s."

== Selected works ==
- Mason, Mary Grimley; Green, Carol Hurd, eds. (1979). Journeys. Autobiographical writings by women. Boston: G. K. Hall. ISBN 9780816183104.
- Sicherman, Barbara; Green, Carol Hurd, eds. (1980). Notable American women. 4: The modern period: a biographical dictionary. Cambridge, Mass: Belknap Press, Harvard University Press. ISBN 9780674627338.
- Linden-Ward, Blanche; Green, Carol Hurd (1993). Changing the future: American women in the 1960s. New York, NY: Twayne of Macmillan. ISBN 9780805799057.
- Green, Carol Hurd; Mason, Mary Grimley, eds. (1994). American women writers: from colonial times to the present 5: Supplement. New York: Ungar. ISBN 9780826406033.
