= Urban prep =

Urban prep may refer to:

- Urban prep (subculture), a 1990s and early 2000s youth subculture influenced by preppy and hip-hop fashion.
- Urban Prep Academies, a network of boys' schools based in Chicago.
