= Robert Porter Keep =

American scholar (1844–1904)

Robert Porter Keep (April 26, 1844 – June 3, 1904) was an American scholar.

Keep was born in Farmington, Connecticut. He graduated from Yale University in 1865, was an instructor there for two years, was United States consul at Piraeus in Greece from 1869 to 1871, taught Greek in Williston Seminary, Easthampton, Massachusetts, from 1876 to 1885, and was principal of Norwich Free Academy, Norwich, Connecticut from 1885 to 1903, with the school owing its prosperity as much to him as to its founders. In 1903 he took charge of Miss Porter's School for Girls at Farmington, founded in 1844 and long controlled by his aunt Sarah Porter, and died there the next year.
