= Robert Bolling Brandegee =

American painter

Robert Bolling Brandegee (1849 – 1922) was an American painter and teacher. He is considered an American Pre-Raphaelite. For many years he taught at Miss Porter's School for Girls in Farmington, Connecticut, and the Art Students League of New York.

His work is in the collections of the National Gallery of Art and New Britain Museum of American Art. The National Academy of Design owns a self-portrait.

== Gallery ==
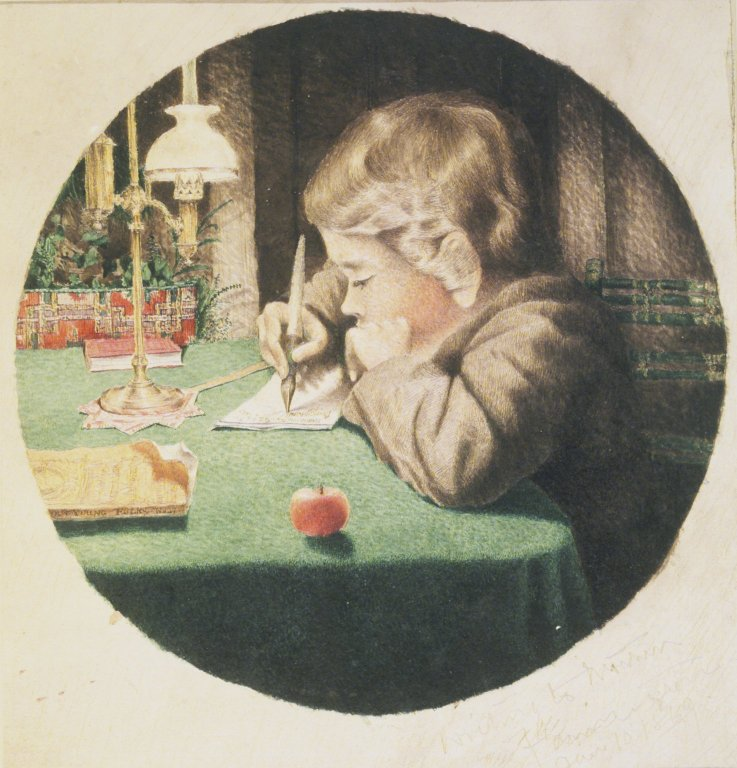
Writing to Mother by Robert Bolling Brandegee circa 1867

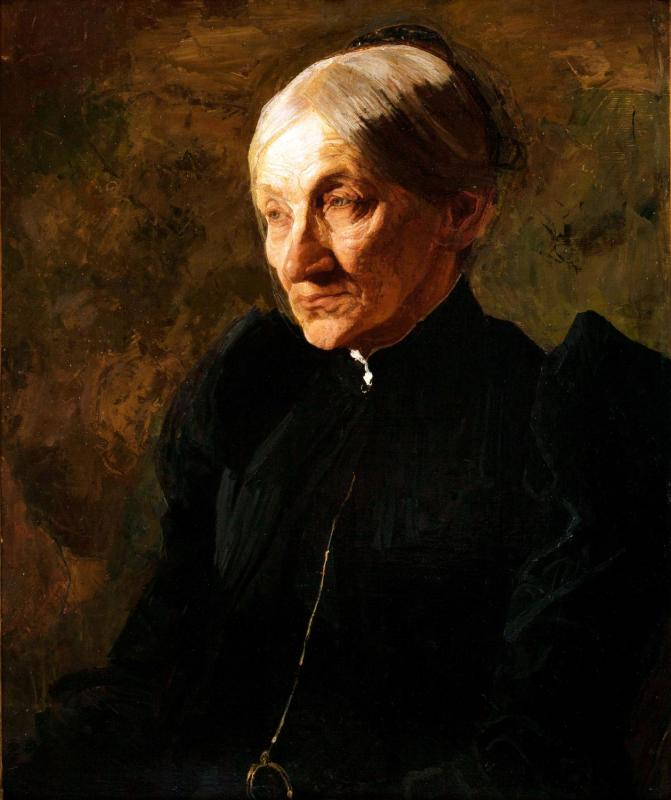
Miss Sarah Porter (circa 1900), in the collection of the New Britain Museum of American Art

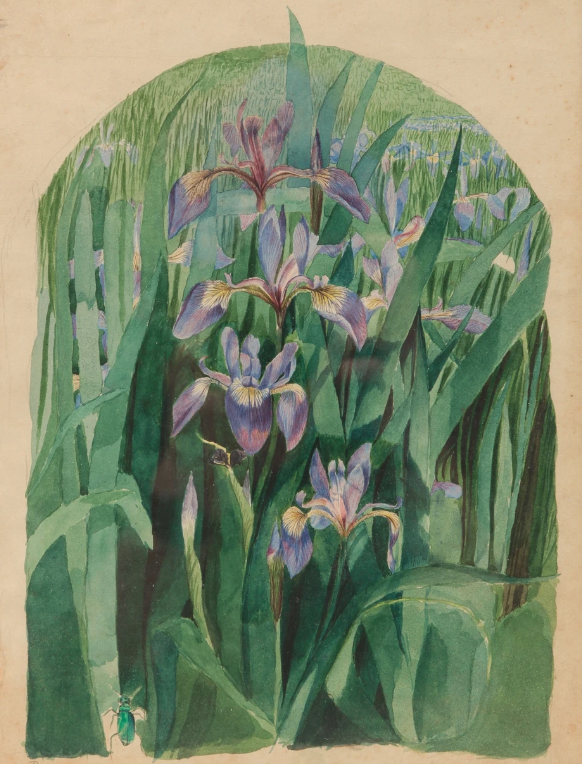
Purple Iris

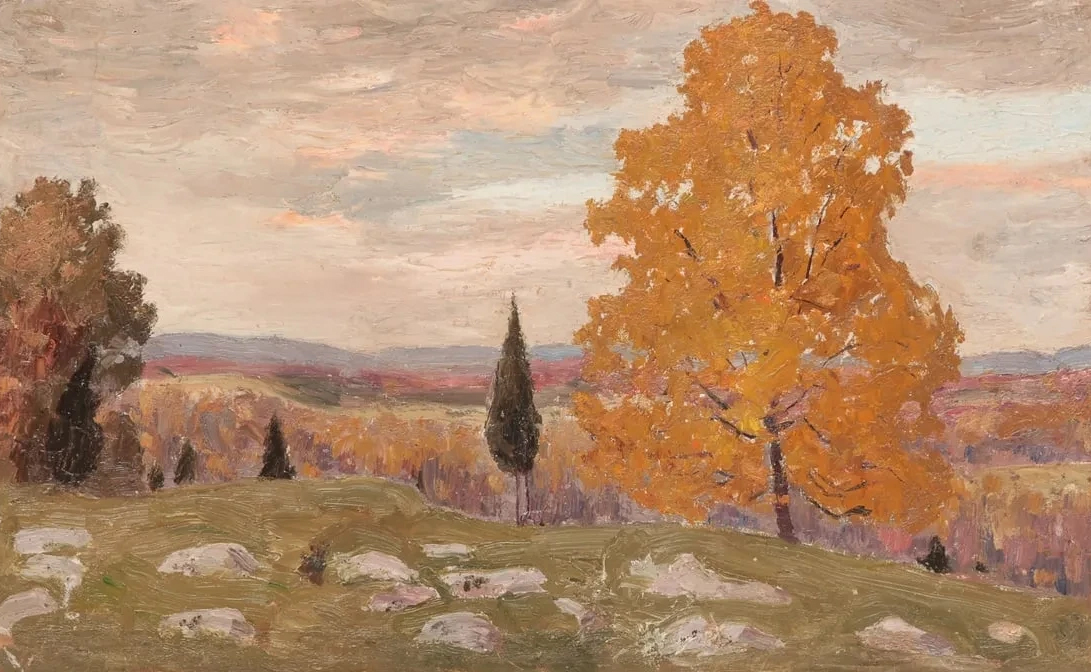
Autumn Fields
