= Oprah Winfrey Charitable Foundation =

United States-based philanthropic foundation

The Oprah Winfrey Charitable Foundation (OWCF) is a United States-based philanthropic foundation dedicated to support education, women, museums, community development, disaster relief, and other charitable endeavors. Established by television host and producer Oprah Winfrey, the Oprah Winfrey Charitable Foundation has distributed millions of dollars to charities around the world.

== History ==
Through the years, Oprah Winfrey, Oprah's Angel Network (1998–2010), the Oprah Winfrey Foundation (established in 1987), and the Oprah Winfrey Charitable Foundation (established in 2010) have donated hours and dollars to numerous non-profit organizations operating in the United States, South Africa, and other countries.

== Financials ==
OWCF has assets of approximately $209 million. In 2006, OWCF received a thirty-six million dollar infusion, and in 2009, a forty million dollar donation from Oprah Winfrey.

In 2022, OWCF disbursed more than twelve million dollars in grants. Since its inception, OWCF and its predecessors have made grants to support several activities, including elementary, secondary, and higher education institutions, after-school programs, teacher development, and other educational activities; COVID-19 relief; African-American history; dance; disaster relief; and other causes.

== Activities ==
=== Alvin Ailey American Dance Theater ===
In 2004, The Oprah Winfrey Foundation pledged one million dollars to endow a student scholarship at the Ailey School at the Alvin Ailey American Dance Theater.

=== Barack Obama Presidential Library ===
OWCF donated fourteen million dollars (seven million in 2018, and seven million in 2019) to the Barack Obama Presidential Library. The library honoring Barack Obama, the 44th president of the United States, is expected to open in 2026.

=== Christmas Kindness South Africa ===
OWCF launched “Christmas Kindness South Africa 2002,” a country-wide project that supplied food, clothing, books, toys, and more to thousands of children.

=== COVID-19 pandemic ===
During the COVID-19 pandemic, Oprah Winfrey and OWCF initially donated twelve million dollars to relief efforts, focusing their efforts on Oprah's “home cities,” Baltimore, Maryland; Chicago, Illinois; Kosciusko, Mississippi; Milwaukee, Wisconsin; and Nashville, Tennessee. In Chicago, OWCF awarded five million dollars to Live Healthy Chicago, a collaboration to assist high-risk populations during the COVID-19 period. In Milwaukee, OWCF awarded a grant to Wellpoint Care Network to provide telehealth mental health services. In Nashville, Oprah Winfrey contacted Tennessee State University president Glenda Glover, who helped to direct a two million dollar donation from OWCF to Nashville Nurtures for grocery store gift cards.

In addition to these efforts, OWCF pledged an additional three million dollars to South LA Forward, a collaboration of SoLa I Can Foundation, SEE-LA, and the Watts Healthcare Corporation, in Los Angeles.

=== La Paz Global ===
In 2023, OWCF donated one million dollars to La Paz Global, an educational nonprofit organization.

=== Maui Health Foundation ===
In 2023, OWCF donated one million dollars to Maui Health Foundation for medical supplies and equipment, including a new CT scanner.

=== Miss Porter's School ===
In 2023, OWCF donated one million dollars to Miss Porter’s School, an all girls school in Farmington, Connecticut. The Oprah Winfrey Leadership Academy for Girls (OWLAG), South Africa, is modeled after Miss Porter's. Katherine Windsor, the 12th Head of Miss Porter's School, chairs the OWLAG board of directors.

=== Morehouse College ===
The Morehouse College Oprah Winfrey Scholars Program has received several donations from OWCF and Oprah Winfrey. During the 2023–24 academic year, fifty Morehouse students were selected as Oprah Winfrey Scholars. Oprah Winfrey first pledged twelve million dollars in scholarship support to Morehouse in 1989. In 2019, OWCF contributed an additional thirteen millions dollars to Morehouse College. In total, Oprah Winfrey and OWCF have donated twenty-five million dollars to this HBCU.

=== National Museum of African American History and Culture ===
Since 2004, Oprah Winfrey has supported the Smithsonian's National Museum of African American History and Culture as a member of the museum's advisory council and donor. In 2013, she donated twelve million dollars to support the capital campaign of the world's largest museum dedicated to African-American history and culture. In 2007, she contributed an additional one million dollars, and in 2024, she donated a little more than one million shares, roughly worth three million dollars, of WW International, formerly Weight Watchers International, to the museum.

=== Oprah Chai ===
In partnership with Starbucks, Oprah Winfrey donated a portion of her profits from the sales of Teavana® Oprah Chai Tea, a limited Starbucks offering, to non-profit groups. During the three-year program, Oprah Winfrey donated more than five millions of her Oprah Chai proceeds to several organizations, including Girls Inc., National CARES Mentoring Movement, West Side High School, Newark, Pathways to College, and U.S. Dream Academy. From its proceeds of Teavana Oprah Chai, Starbucks donated twenty-one million dollars to support youth education.

=== Oprah Winfrey Boys & Girls Club of Kosciusko/Attala County ===
In 2006, the Oprah Winfrey Boys & Girls Club of Kosciusko/Attala County, a 32,000-square foot recreational facility for children supported by gifts from Oprah Winfrey and her foundation, opened in Kosciusko, Mississippi, Winfrey's hometown.

=== Oprah Winfrey Leadership Academy for Girls ===
In 2000, Oprah Winfrey met with former South African president Nelson Mandela to discuss building a new school for girls in South Africa. In 2007, the Oprah Winfrey Leadership Academy for Girls (OWLAG), a boarding school for girls, grades 8–12, opened in Henley on Klip, Gauteng Province, South Africa. Through the years, Oprah and OWCF have contributed more than $200 million to South African education, primarily for academically gifted girls from disadvantaged backgrounds.

=== Pathways to College ===
In 2020, OWCF committed five million dollars to Pathways to College, an after-school program in Newark, New Jersey.

=== People's Fund of Maui ===
In 2023, Oprah Winfrey in partnership with Dwayne Johnson pledged ten million dollars to create the “People's Fund of Maui,” in response to the 2023 Hawaii wildfires. In total, the fund distributed nearly sixty million dollars to more than 8,100 Maui residents who were affected by the wildfires.

=== Providence St. Mel School ===
In 1993, Oprah Winfrey donated one million dollars to Providence St. Mel School, a private school on the westside of Chicago.

=== Ron Clark Academy ===
In 2017, Oprah Winfrey donated five million dollars to Ron Clark Academy, a nonprofit middle school school in Atlanta, Georgia.

=== SAG AFTRA Foundation ===
In 2023, OWCF donated one million dollars to the SAG-AFTRA Foundation, including support for its Emergency Financial Assistance Program for actors impacted by the 2023 SAG-AFTRA strike.

=== Teach for America ===
OWCF granted one million dollars to Teach For America’s social-emotional learning program, a wellness initiative for teachers, students, and staff.

=== United Negro College Fund ===
In 2019, Oprah Winfrey announced a $1,149,000 gift to the United Negro College Fund (UNCF) at the organization's 17th Annual Maya Angelou Women Who Lead Luncheon in Charlotte, North Carolina.

=== University of Massachusetts, Lowell ===
OWCF granted a $1.5 million matching gift to the University of Massachusetts, Lowell in 2019. The grant will establish an Oprah Winfrey Scholarship at the university. In 2018, Winfrey participated in the school's Chancellor Series, where she agreed to match the total amount raised from the special event hosted by UMass Lowell chancellor Jacqueline Moloney.

=== Urban Prep Academies ===
In 2009, the Oprah Winfrey Foundation donated $250,000 to Urban Prep in Chicago, an all boys school that lost its charter school status due to allegations of misconduct in 2022.

=== U.S. Dream Academy ===
In 2023, Oprah Winfrey pledged $2,500,000 to the U.S. Dream Academy. The academy supports children of incarcerated parents and their families. In 2024, Oprah Winfrey announced a matching grant to support the organization's national positive youth development at the 23rd Annual Power of a Dream Celebration, where Winfrey received the Legacy Award for her longtime support of the U.S. Dream Academy.

=== West Side High School, Newark ===
In 2019, Oprah Winfrey and OWCF donated $500,000 to West Side High School, Newark for the school's summer “Lights On” initiative.

== Oprah's Angel Network ==
Established in 1998, Oprah's Angel Network raised more than $80 million for charitable projects, funding scholarships, women's shelters, and youth centers and residential facilities. Oprah Winfrey donated more than one million dollars to the Angel Network in 2009.

The Angel Network ceased operations in 2010.

== Leadership and management ==
- Oprah Winfrey, trustee
- Robert Greene, trustee
- Gayle King, trustee

== See also ==
- Harpo Productions
- Oprah Winfrey Leadership Academy for Girls
- Financial endowment
- Private foundation
- Foundation (nonprofit)
