= The New Girls =

1979 novel by Beth Gutcheon

- First edition (publ. G. P. Putnam's Sons)
- Author: Beth Gutcheon
- Language: English
- Publisher: G. P. Putnam's Sons
- Publication date: 1979
- ISBN: 0-399-12362-8 (first edition)
- Dewey Decimal: 813.54
- LC Class: PZ4.G9825 Ne

The New Girls is a 1979 novel by American author Beth Gutcheon.

The novel, which describes the experiences of five young women in 1960s America, was based on Gutcheon's experiences at Miss Porter's School. Some characters experience anorexia over the course of the novel. It also describes the head of school's adverse reaction to the use of the term "diaphragm" in a student play.

Spieler likens it to works such as The Secret History, Gilmore Girls, and Gossip Girl, as all these texts revolve around an outsider entering into an elite boarding school environment.

Lisa Birnbach, in a follow-up to The Official Preppy Handbook, includes The New Girls on "the true prep master reading list".

== Sources ==
- White, Barbara Anne (1985). Growing Up Female: Adolescent Girlhood in American Fiction. Westport, Connecticut: Greenwood Press. ISBN 9780313250651. OCLC 1149302332.
