= Beth Gutcheon =

American author (born 1945)

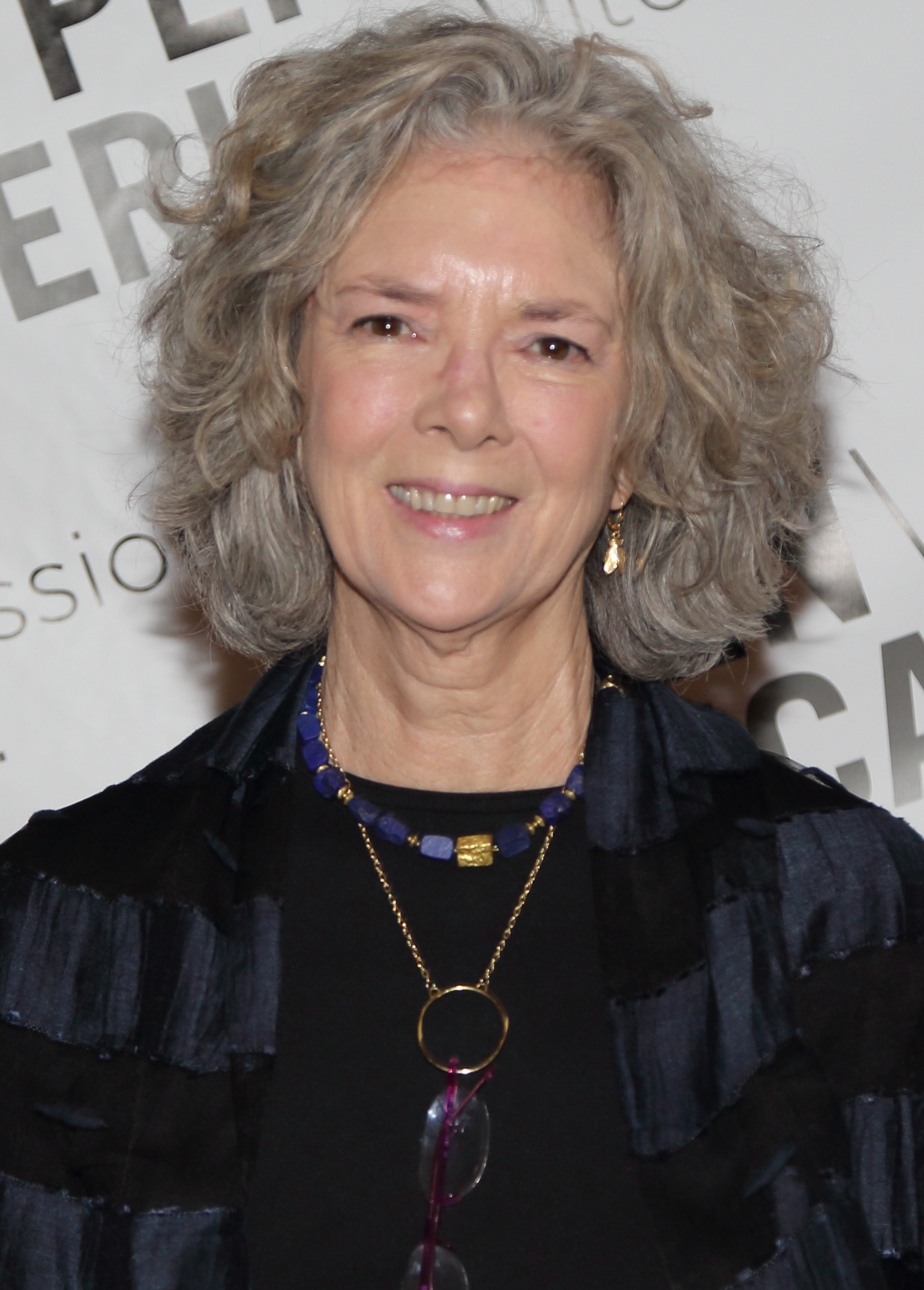
- Education: Miss Porter's School, Harvard University
- Occupation: Novelist
- Writing career
- Language: English language
- Website: www.bethgutcheon.com

Beth Gutcheon is an American author who has written ten novels and two quilting books.

== Life and career ==
A graduate of Miss Porter's School in Farmington, Connecticut, Gutcheon went on to study at Harvard University, earning a bachelor of arts with honors in English.

In 1973, Gutcheon published her first book, The Perfect Patchwork Primer. Two years later came its sequel, The Quilt Design Workbook, written with then-husband, Jeffrey Gutcheon. Both works are considered classics in their field.

In 1978, Gutcheon wrote the narration for a feature-length documentary about the Kirov ballet school in St. Petersburg, Russia, called The Children of Theatre Street, which was nominated for an Academy Award. Other screenplays include The Good Fight (1992), starring Terry O’Quinn and Christine Lahti, for Lifetime.

Gutcheon's first novel, The New Girls, was published in 1979. The novel drew loosely upon the author's own experience of the cruel and rarified atmosphere of elite boarding schools, and was well received by critics.

Her second novel, Still Missing, was translated into 14 languages, and published in a condensed version by Reader's Digest, a large print edition for the vision-impaired, and made into an audio book. Gutcheon used her appearances promoting the novel, whose plot centered on a child abduction, to elevate the subject of missing children to the level of a national issue, raising public awareness and support for Child Find of America. The appearance of Missing Child photos on milk cartons was a direct result of this campaign, as was the creation of National Missing Children's Day. Still Missing was bought for the screen by movie producer Stanley R. Jaffe, who had recently won the Best Picture Oscar for Kramer vs. Kramer. Gutcheon was retained to write the screenplay. The finished film, titled Without A Trace, was released by Twentieth Century Fox in February 1983, starring Kate Nelligan, Judd Hirsch, and Stockard Channing.

Because of the similar timing of Still Missing and Without A Trace, some suggested a strained relationship between Gutcheon and the parents of famously missing child Etan Patz. The controversy was corrected in a 1982 letter to the Editor at The New York Times where Stanley K. Patz, Etan's father, said "We repeatedly stated that we had no quarrel with Beth Gutcheon and that we liked her."

In spring 2010, Still Missing, was re-published in the UK by Persephone Books, a London-based publisher committed to reprinting "neglected classics by 20th Century (mostly women) writers".

Gutcheon's other novels include bestsellers Domestic Pleasures (1991) published in British, French, German and Swedish editions, Saying Grace (1995), Five Fortunes (1998), and More Than You Know (2000) which are all available in German, as well. More Than You Know went on to become a Los Angeles Times Best Book of the Year. Leeway Cottage (2005) became a national bestseller the same year that HarperCollins republished Gutcheon's entire backlist in uniform trade paperback editions.

Her 2008 novel Good-bye and Amen was published in hardcover and HarperPerennial trade paper back editions; the audio version was a finalist for an Audie Award for Best Recorded Novel of the Year, 2010.

Her 2012 novel Gossip was released by HarperCollins on March 20, 2012. The Affliction, the sequel to Death At Breakfast (2016), was released by Wm/Morrow/HarperCollins in 2018.

== Selected works ==
- Novels:
  - March, 2018: The Affliction, A Maggie Detweiler and Hope Babbin mystery, #2 (Wm. Morrow/HarperCollins, ISBN 978-0-06-243199-8, Wm. Morrow Trade Paperback, 2013, ISBN 978-0-06-243200-1, HarperLuxe Large Print edition, ISBN 978-0-06-279140-5, Harper Audio Unabridged Audio Book, 2016, ISBN 978-0-06-244549-0)
  - 2016: Death At Breakfast, A Maggie Detweiler and Hope Babbin mystery, #1 (Wm. Morrow/HarperCollins, ISBN 978-0-06-243196-7, Wm. Morrow Trade Paperback, 2013, ISBN 978-0-06-243197-4, HarperLuxe Large Print edition, ISBN 978-0-06-246633-4, Harper Audio Unabridged Audio Book, 2016, ISBN 978-0-06-244548-3)
  - 2012: Gossip (Wm. Morrow/HarperCollins, ISBN 978-0-06-193142-0, HarperPerennial Trade Paperback, 2013, ISBN 978-0-06-193143-7)
  - 2008: Good-bye and Amen (Wm. Morrow/HarperCollins, ISBN 978-0-06-053907-8; HarperPerennial Trade Paperback, 2009, ISBN 978-0-06-053908-5; Tantor Media Unabridged audio, 2008)
  - 2005: Leeway Cottage (Wm. Morrow/HarperCollins ISBN 0-06-053905-4; HarperPerennial Trade Paperback, 2006, ISBN 0-06-053906-2, ISBN 978-0-06-053906-1; Chivers Sound Library/AudioGo Unabridged Audio Book, 2005; Harper Audio Abridged Audio Book, 2005)
  - 2000: More Than You Know (Wm. Morrow/HarperCollins, ISBN 0-688-17403-5; HarperPerennial Trade Paperback, 2001, ISBN 0-06-095935-5, ISBN 978-0-06-095935-7; Wheeler Large Print edition, 2001; Recorded Books Unabridged Audio Book, 2001; German Edition, 2005)
  - 1998: Five Fortunes (Cliff Street Books, 1998, ISBN 978-0-06-017679-2; HarperPerennial Trade Paperback, 1999, ISBN 0-06-092995-2; Harper Perennial Trade Paperback, 2005, ISBN 978-0-06-092995-4; German Edition, 2005)
  - 1995: Saying Grace (HarperCollins, 1995, ISBN 0-06-017678-4; HarperPerennial Trade Paperback, 1996, ISBN 0-06-092727-5; HarperPerennial Trade Paperback, 2005, ISBN 978-0-06-092727-1; German Edition, 2005)
  - 1991: Domestic Pleasures (Villard, ISBN 0-394-54579-6; St. Martin's Press Mass Market Paperback, 1992, ISBN 0-312-92861-0; HarperPerennial Trade Paperback, 2001, ISBN 0-06-093476-X, HarperPerennial Trade Paperback, 2005, ISBN 978-0-06-093476-7; French, Swedish and German editions; New German edition, 2005)
  - 1981: Still Missing (G. P. Putnam, ISBN 0-399-12578-7; Dell Mass Market Paperback, 1982, ISBN 0-440-17864-9; British edition, French hardcover, trade paperback and mass market paperback editions in 1982, plus a hardcover movie tie-in edition. Also German, Finnish, Japanese, Norwegian, Swedish, Danish, Brazilian, Portuguese, Italian, Dutch and Spanish editions, plus a pirated translation in Cantonese, a large print edition, and a recording for the blind; mass market paperback movie tie-in edition 1983 as Without a Trace, Dell, ISBN 0-440-19496-2; HarperPerennial Trade Paperback 2005, ISBN 0-06-097703-5, ISBN 978-0-06-097703-0; New German edition 2005; New British publication by Persephone Books, 2009, ISBN 978-1-903155-78-3)
  - 1979: The New Girls (G. P. Putnam, ISBN 0-399-12362-8; Avon Mass Market Paperback, 1981, ISBN 0-380-50831-1; Sphere British Edition Paperback, 1982; HarperPerennial Trade Paperback, 1996, ISBN 0-06-097702-7; New HarperPerennial Trade Paperback Edition, 2005, ISBN 0-06-097702-7, ISBN 978-0-06-097702-3; German edition 2005)
- Quilt books:
  - 1976: The Quilt Design Workbook with Jeffrey Gutcheon (Rawson Associates Hardcover, ISBN 0-89256-004-5; Alchemy Press Trade Paperback, 1978, ISBN 0-89256-004-5)
  - 1973: The Perfect Patchwork Primer (David McKay Company, ISBN 0-679-50385-4; Penguin Books Trade paperback, 1981, ISBN 0-14-046212-0, ISBN 978-0-14-046212-8)

== Sources ==
- Miss Porter's School for Girls
- New York Times Review of Without a Trace, 1983
- Still Missing at Persephone Books
- Author Profile at Persephone Books
