= Without a Trace (1983 film) =

1983 American drama film by Stanley R. Jaffe

- Theatrical release poster
- Directed by: Stanley R. Jaffe
- Screenplay by: Beth Gutcheon
- Based on: Still Missing; 1981 novel by Beth Gutcheon
- Produced by: Stanley R. Jaffe
- Starring: Kate Nelligan; Judd Hirsch; David Dukes; Stockard Channing
- Cinematography: John Bailey
- Edited by: Cynthia Scheider
- Music by: Jack Nitzsche
- Distributed by: 20th Century Fox
- Release date: February 4, 1983
- Running time: 120 minutes
- Country: United States
- Language: English
- Box office: $9.6 million

Without a Trace is a 1983 American drama film directed by Stanley R. Jaffe and starring Kate Nelligan, Judd Hirsch, David Dukes and Stockard Channing. Adapted by screenwriter Beth Gutcheon from her own 1981 novel Still Missing, the story is partly based on the real-life disappearance of Etan Patz.

== Plot ==
Susan Selky, an English professor at Columbia University, lives in a Brooklyn brownstone with her 6-year-old son Alex. One March morning, she sees Alex off to his school, two blocks away.

Returning home after work, Susan becomes increasingly alarmed when Alex is late. She learns from a classmate's mother that Alex was not in school that day. She calls the New York City Police Department, and officers descend on the townhouse, led by Lieutenant Al Menetti. The police suspect her estranged husband, Graham, a professor at New York University, but he produces an alibi.

Susan's case generates media attention, and volunteers help by distributing posters. Susan is initially criticized for allowing her son to walk to school alone. A polygraph test clears her as a suspect. Numerous leads are checked, including several reports that Alex may have been seen in the back seat of a blue 1965 Chevy. A psychic is also called in, but each lead fizzles.

The investigation drags on, and Graham is at odds with Menetti after budget cuts force him to dismantle the command center in Susan's apartment and run the case from the precinct. At one point, Graham takes matters into his own hands after receiving a ransom call. Given a beating, he requires a hospital stay.

A break in the case happens when a pair of Alex's bloody underpants is found in the apartment of Susan's housekeeper, Philippe. It's learned that the gay Philippe was picked up with a 14-year-old male prostitute. Philippe swears he did not harm Alex and says the bloody underpants were Alex's old pair that he used as a polishing cloth. He used it to stop the bleeding after cutting himself washing dishes. Convinced that Philippe is innocent, Susan tries to persuade Menetti to drop the charges, but he refuses, citing undisclosed physical evidence.

The renewed media coverage dies down, and Susan faces increased pressure to accept that Alex could be dead. One day, Susan receives a rambling phone call from Malvina Robbins in Bridgeport, Connecticut, who claims Alex is living with her neighbors. Menetti tells Susan he has also heard from Robbins, but that Bridgeport police have dismissed her as a crank. The investigation is closed, and Philippe faces trial within weeks.

On a day off, Menetti takes his young son for a drive. Seeing a highway exit sign for Bridgeport, Connecticut, Menetti decides to check out the lead after all. When he arrives at Robbins' address, he immediately spots a blue Chevy (in which witnesses had reported seeing Alex) parked in the driveway of the neighboring house. Realizing that Robbins was truthful, he calls the Bridgeport police, who find Alex alive and unharmed. His kidnapper used the boy to care for his disabled sister who lives in the house.

Menetti drives Alex back to New York with a police escort that grows into a massive motorcade as each jurisdiction along the route joins in. Tipped off that Alex has been found, local media converge on Susan's Brooklyn house. She returns from grocery shopping in time to see Alex step out of Menetti's car. In front of bystanders and reporters, mother and child are reunited.

== Cast ==
- Kate Nelligan as Susan Selky
- Judd Hirsch as Det. Al Menetti
- David Dukes as Graham Selky
- Stockard Channing as Jocelyn Norris
- Danny Corkill as Alex Selky
- Louise Stubbs as Malvina Robbins
- Keith McDermott as Philippe
- David Simon as Menetti's son

== Production ==
The film's screenplay was written by novelist and screenwriter Beth Gutcheon, who kept the film relatively faithful to her novel Still Missing, a work of fiction. The one glaring difference between the book and the film is that the book was set in Boston, while the film was set and filmed in New York. The film was originally supposed to be titled Still Missing, but was changed by the studio to avoid confusion with the 1982 film Missing.

== Release ==
The film was released in North America on February 4, 1983, and grossed $9.6 million.

== Reception ==
Janet Maslin of The New York Times called it "a reasonably well-made film" on its own terms but said it "deserves more thoughtful and imaginative treatment".
