= Danny Corkill =

American actor

- Born: Daniel Bryon Corkill; Park Ridge, Illinois
- Years active: 1983–1988

Danny Corkill is an American former child actor who saw early success in such films as Without a Trace and D.A.R.Y.L.. He appeared in a number of commercials and had a small part in the TV series Ryan's Hope. He was born in Park Ridge, Illinois, and, now retired from acting, lives in the St. Paul area.

== Selected filmography ==
| Year | Title | Role | Notes |
|---|---|---|---|
| 1983 | Without a Trace | Alex Selky | |
| 1984 | Dune | Orlop | |
| 1984 | Mrs. Soffel | Eddie Soffel | |
| 1985 | D.A.R.Y.L. | Turtle Fox | |
| 1986 | Alex: The Life of a Child | Christian Deford | ABC Tv Movie |
| 1988 | Rocket Gibraltar | Kane Rockwell | |
