= Oprah Winfrey Foundation =

Charity

The Oprah Winfrey Foundation was established in 1987, and is a separate entity from the Oprah Winfrey Charitable Foundation.

== Select grants ==
=== Alvin Ailey American Dance Theater ===
In 2004, The Oprah Winfrey Foundation pledged one million dollars to endow a student scholarship at the Ailey School at the Alvin Ailey American Dance Theater.

=== Oprah Winfrey Boys & Girls Club of Kosciusko/Attala County ===
In 2006, the Oprah Winfrey Boys & Girls Club of Kosciusko/Attala County, a 32,000-square foot recreational facility for children supported by gifts from Oprah Winfrey and her foundation, opened in Kosciusko, Mississippi, Winfrey's hometown.

=== Oprah Winfrey Leadership Academy for Girls ===
In 2000, Oprah Winfrey met with former South African president Nelson Mandela to discuss building a new school for girls in South Africa. In 2007, the Oprah Winfrey Leadership Academy for Girls (OWLAG), a boarding school for girls, grades 8–12, opened in Henley on Klip, Gauteng Province, South Africa. Through the years, Oprah and OWCF have contributed more than $200 million to South African education, primarily for academically gifted girls from disadvantaged backgrounds.

=== Providence St. Mel School ===
In 1993, Oprah Winfrey donated one million dollars to Providence St. Mel School, a private school on the westside of Chicago.

=== Urban Prep Academies ===
In 2009, the Oprah Winfrey Foundation donated $250,000 to Urban Prep in Chicago, an all boys school that lost its charter school status due to allegations of misconduct in 2022.

== See also ==
- Oprah Winfrey Charitable Foundation
