= Sarah Porter =

American educator

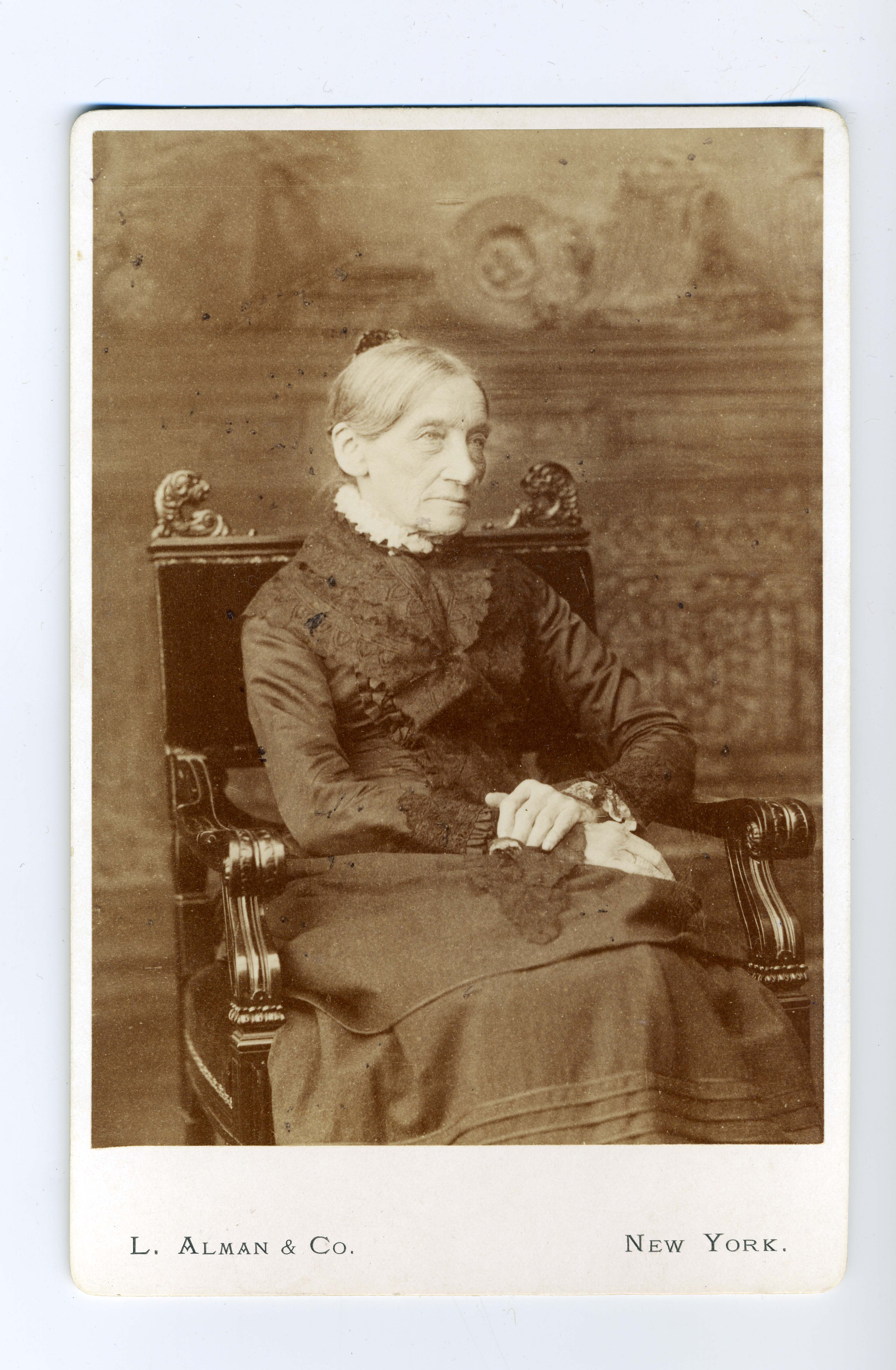
- Cabinet card by Louis Alman, 1888
- Born: August 16, 1813; Farmington, Connecticut, U.S.
- Died: February 18, 1900 (aged 86); Farmington, Connecticut, U.S.
- Occupation: Educator
- Known for: Miss Porter's School
- Relatives: Noah Porter (brother)

Sarah Porter (August 16, 1813 – February 18, 1900) was the American educator who founded Miss Porter's School, a private college preparatory school for girls.

== Biography ==
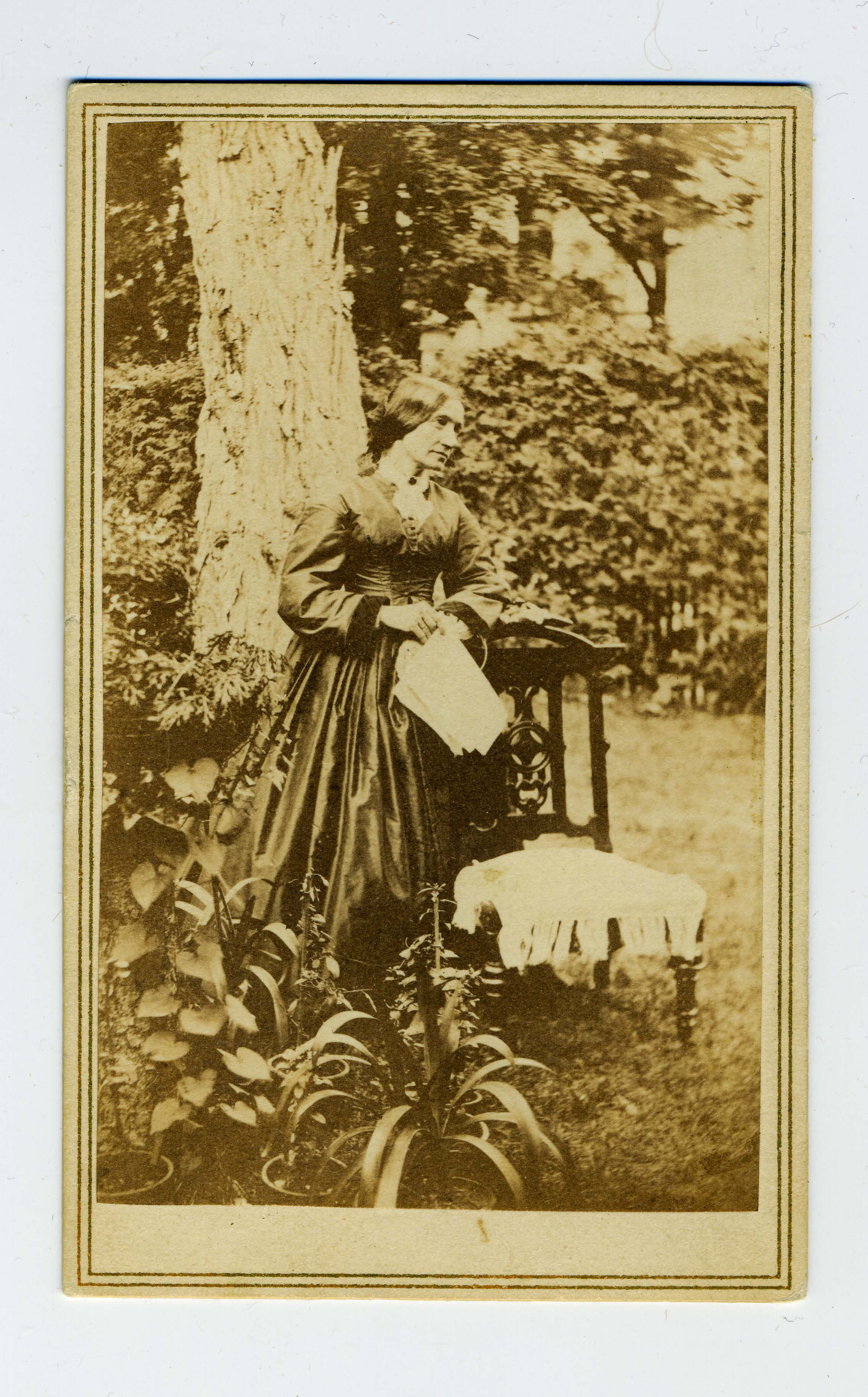
Carte de visite by the Kellogg Brothers, 1860s

She was born in Farmington, Connecticut, to Rev. Noah Porter (1781 – 1866) and his wife, Mehetable "Meigs" Porter (1786 – 1874). Her older brother, Noah Porter, was President of Yale College from 1871 to 1886.

She was educated at Farmington Academy and at the Young Ladies Institute in New Haven, and, uncharacteristically for women of the time, studied privately with Yale College professors. She taught in Massachusetts, New York and Pennsylvania, and returned to Connecticut to found a female counterpart to Simeon Hart's Academy for Boys. In 1843, she opened Miss Porter's School in her hometown of Farmington "in an effort to be financially independent of her parents". Initially, she had only 25 students, but because of the school's expansive curriculum, including the sciences as well as the humanities, the daughters of the affluent soon made it their school of choice, and the school quickly expanded. She encouraged students to pursue academic excellence and exercise. In the book Where Girls Come First: The Rise, Fall, and Surprising Revival of Girls' Schools, Lana DeBare wrote that Porter was "deeply committed to her work" and "saw her job as educating women to fill the traditional role of Christian wife and mother". Historian Barbara Sicherman wrote that "despite a strong intellectual bent, Miss Porter–a devout Congregationalist–encouraged the acquisition of Christian character, liberal culture, and disciplined womanhood rather than learning for its own sake or preparation for a career". Porter opposed women's colleges and "discouraged her students from attending college". She also did not "hire college-educated teachers" – in a 1883 letter, Porter wrote "I do not want one college trained woman—they are narrow, arrogant—and do not infuse the spirit which I want". Prominent students of the Porter School include Alice Hamilton, Edith Hamilton, architect Theodate Pope Riddle, Gloria Vanderbilt, and Jacqueline Kennedy Onassis.

Porter was an opponent of women's suffrage but promoted other legal reforms for women, including reforms in divorce and property laws.

She died in 1900.
