= Urban Prep Academies =

Non-profit operating schools in Chicago, Illinois, US

Location
- 420 N. Wabash Avenue (Suite 500); Chicago, Illinois 60611; United States
- Coordinates: 41°53′23.29″N 87°37′41.67″W

Information
- Motto: We Believe.
- Established: 2002
- Founder: Tim King
- School district: Chicago Public Schools
- Website: urbanprep.org

Urban Prep Academies (also known as Urban Prep Charter Academy for Young Men or simply Urban Prep) is a nonprofit organization that operated three free open-enrollment public all-male college-preparatory high schools in Chicago. Founded in 2002, and receiving its first charter approval from Chicago Public Schools in 2005, it operates the first all-male public charter high school in the United States. The network opened a second campus in 2009 and a third in August 2010. From 2010 to 2019, 100% of the seniors in the school's graduating classes were admitted to four-year colleges or universities. In 2023 its charter was revoked over misconduct allegations and Chicago Public Schools moved to take over its campuses. The decision is controversial and is being contested in court.

== History ==
In 2002, a group of African-American civic, business, and education leaders, organized by former Hales Franciscan High School President Tim King, determined to establish a new high school in Chicago focused on providing a strong, college-preparatory high school option for boys in under-served African-American communities. African-American males had been, and continue to be, the lowest-performing demographic in Chicago Public Schools. A University of Chicago study published in 2006 reported that only one in 40 African-American boys in Chicago Public Schools will eventually graduate from a 4-year university. The Chicago Board of Education approved Urban Prep Academies' charter application in 2005, and Urban Prep opened its first school, Urban Prep Charter Academy for Young Men — Englewood Campus, the subsequent September. It is the first charter high school for boys in the country and currently enrolls 460 students in grades 9–12.

Urban Prep's second school opened in the East Garfield Park community in 2009, and moved to the near west side of the city in 2011. Urban Prep's third campus, serving the historic Bronzeville community, opened in 2010. Based on its success thus far, Urban Prep plans to open more schools in the Chicago area and in other low-performing urban centers. Approximately 85% of Urban Prep students are low-income and nearly all are African-American.

=== Admissions ===
Admission to Urban Prep is determined through a lottery system. Enrollment is open to all matriculating 9th grade boys living in Chicago. Information on the lottery admission process is available on Urban Prep's admissions webpage.

=== Support and funding ===
Urban Prep Academies is a 501(c)(3) tax-deductible non-profit organization, and relies substantially on private donors to support its operations. The organization's largest source of funding is the Illinois State Board of Education, which funds all charter schools in the state on a per-pupil basis. In 2008, Urban Prep received an anonymous donation of $1,000,000. In 2009, the Oprah Winfrey Foundation donated $250,000.

=== Media ===
Urban Prep has been the subject of national and international news features. Virtually all local television news outlets in Chicago have profiled the schools, as have CNN and The 700 Club on their national broadcasts. Print media on the school has included pieces in the Wall Street Journal, The Economist, Chicago Tribune, Ebony magazine and The Guardian. During the 2009 Presidential Inauguration, Urban Prep students who had traveled to Washington D.C. were interviewed on CNN with newscaster Don Lemon. During the interview, Lemon referred to the students as the "Little Obamas." CNN has used the phrase to refer to Urban Prep students in subsequent newscasts, and Oprah Winfrey repeated the phrase when discussing the school in a segment of The Oprah Winfrey Show regarding education in the US.

The schools again became the focus of national media attention in March 2010, upon the announcement that 100% of the first graduating class had been accepted to a four-year college or university. Chicago Mayor Richard M. Daley visited the Englewood Campus to speak with students, and various national media outlets featured the school. The Chicago Tribune covered the story on its front page, MSNBC, CNN, and Fox News all ran short segments on the senior class, and ABC World News Tonight with Diane Sawyer profiled the school as its "Person of the Week." Daley again visited the Englewood Campus at the announcement that the Class of 2011 had followed their schoolmates in having all graduating class members accepted to a four-year college or university. Urban Prep became the focus on national attention again in 2012 when they announced a "three-peat", with all graduating members of the Class of 2012 having been accepted to college. The announcement ceremony was attended by Illinois Governor Patrick Quinn. The announcement coincided with a Chicago Tribune editorial endorsing the school's success.

== School programs ==
- Arcs: Urban Prep structures its educational approach through four curricular and extracurricular "arcs":
  - The Academic Arc: a rigorous college prep curriculum with added focus on reading, writing, and public speaking skills.
  - The Service Arc: a focus on deepening the students' sense of responsibility and identification of community needs by completing volunteer programs throughout the area.
  - The Activity Arc: a focus on increasing students' confidence, interpersonal skills, and leadership qualities by participating in at least two school-sponsored activities per year (sports, clubs, etc.).
  - The Professional Arc: a focus on providing students with valuable experience in a professional setting by requiring them to spend one day a week within such a setting. This serves to reinforce character and leadership development in students, as well as providing for them a means of work experience.
- School Culture: A positive school culture is maintained by continued emphasis on the "Four R's":
  - Respect: Students and staff members address each other by surnames (Mr. Hatch, Ms. Johnson) only.
  - Responsibility: Students are held accountable to a strict code of conduct.
  - Ritual: Daily, weekly and yearly rituals such as Community and Tropaia reinforce feelings of community and self-worth.
  - Relationship: Each Urban Prep staff member is issued a cell phone whose number is distributed to all students, allowing for continuous contact.
- Pride System: Each grade level at Urban Prep is divided into six groups of twenty students, known as "Prides". The "Pride" name is derived from the school's mascot, the Lion. Prides function as smaller units within the school to provide each student with an individualized mentor (the Pride Leader, typically an Urban Prep Fellow), as well as a peer-support network. Prides compete with one another for points awarded for good attendance, high average GPA, and through intramural athletic competitions. Alternatively, Prides may lose points for dress infractions, attendance violations, or other disciplinary infractions. The Pride with the highest overall point total is awarded the Pride Cup at the annual year-end ceremony, known as Tropaia.
- Uniforms and Discipline: Urban Prep students are required to wear uniforms and adhere to a clearly communicated discipline program based on community and mutual respect. The Urban Prep school uniform consists of khaki pants, a white buttoned down and collared dress shirt, solid-red school necktie, and black two-button blazer with an embroidered school crest.
- Summer Programs: During the summers, the students participate in academic, professional, and service programs throughout Chicago and around the world. Recently, students have attended summer programs at the UK's Oxford and Cambridge universities, as well as elite stateside institutions including Northwestern University and Georgetown University. All incoming freshmen must attend the summer program that begins in August and ends just before the beginning of the school year.
- Athletics: Urban Prep campuses operate independent athletic programs that participate separately, and occasionally compete against one another, in the Chicago Public League. The Lions currently compete in the following sports:
  - Baseball
  - Basketball
  - Bowling
  - Cross country
  - Football
  - Golf
  - Track and field
  - Wrestling

== Urban Prep Fellows Program ==
The Urban Prep Fellows Program, launched at Urban Prep in 2009, recruits recent college graduates from around the nation to work as full-time volunteer mentors, leaders, and educators for students at Urban Prep for a period of one year. Urban Prep Fellows are matched with a group of about twenty students - called a "Pride," of which there are six in each grade level - to provide mentoring, academic support, social and emotional guidance, and instruction in one course. In addition to their service to the students, Fellows participate in ongoing community activities and a seminar series to connect their experiences with leaders and ideas shaping change in urban communities. During the Fellowship year, Fellows are provided with housing, transportation, health benefits, and a monthly living stipend.

== Urban Prep Alumni Program ==
Due to the school's emphasis on success in college, the Urban Prep Alumni Program was launched in 2009, before the first senior class had graduated. Based out of the school's office at 420 North Wabash, the Alumni Program maintains contact with and helps provide for the unique needs of each of Urban Prep's graduates. In addition to publishing a regular alumni newsletter, the Alumni Program helps graduates navigate the intricacies of applying for financial aid and finding tutoring help, as needed. Urban Prep graduates have matriculated into a wide array of public and private colleges and universities, including Georgetown, Cornell, Northwestern, Grinnell, Morehouse and the University of Virginia.

== Urban Prep Charter Academy for Young Men - Englewood Campus ==
Urban Prep Charter Academy for Young Men (Englewood Campus)
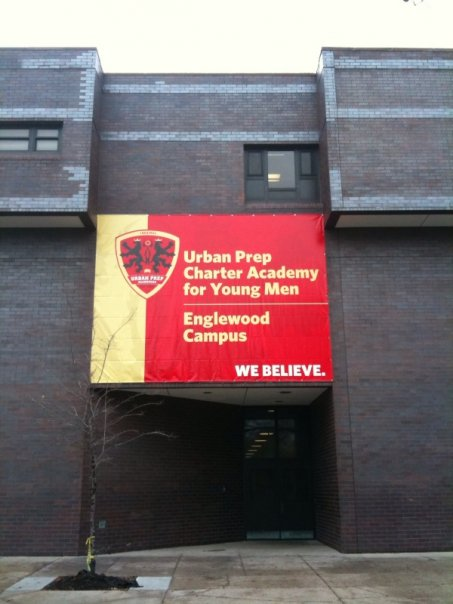
- Main entrance.

Location
- 6201 S. Stewart Avenue; Chicago, Illinois 60621; United States

Information
- School type: All-male; Charter; Public; High school
- Opened: 2006
- Founder: Tim King
- Principal: Joseph Mason
- Grades: 9–12
- Athletics conference: Chicago Public League
- Newspaper: Lion's Roar

=== History ===
Urban Prep Charter Academy for Young Men - Englewood Campus opened in the fall of 2006 as the United States' first all-male public charter high school. The school's charter was granted in 2005 by the Chicago Board of Education with support from Mayor Richard M. Daley and Chicago Public Schools CEO Arne Duncan's Renaissance 2010 initiative, which aimed to open 100 new schools in Chicago before the year 2010. During its first year of operations, the school was located in the former facility of Chicago Public Schools' Robert Lindblom High School. In the fall of 2007, the school relocated to its present home, another CPS facility, at 6201 S. Stewart, site of the former Englewood High School (Chicago) building.

== Academics ==
=== School Traditions ===
- Convocation: At the start of each academic year, incoming freshman students from all Urban Prep Academies campuses gather together for an evening event to mark the transition into high school. Urban Prep's Convocation ceremony is rife with rituals, including a procession of the organization's board members and faculty in full academic regalia, speeches by noteworthy public figures, a public show of support by the schools' "Brothers' Keepers," presentation of crested uniform blazers for the freshmen, and the students' first public recitation of the school creed.
- Red and Gold Bowl: The first football match between Urban Prep's Englewood and East Garfield Park campuses occurred in 2009, and was referred to as the "Red and Gold Bowl." Due to the fact that 2009 was the inaugural year of the East Garfield Park campus, and the campus only had a freshman (and not a junior varsity or varsity) football team, only the schools' freshman teams played one another.
- Tropaia: At the end of each academic year, a school-wide banquet is held to honor students' achievements in the previous year. Individual awards are given for the student at each grade level with the best attendance record, most improvement in GPA, and highest overall GPA. The Pride Cup is awarded to the Pride which has accumulated the most points in the previous year. The name of the ceremony is derived from the Greek word meaning "trophy."
- Speaker Series: Past guest speakers at the Englewood Campus include director Spike Lee, US Congressman Bobby Rush, US Senator Dick Durbin, US Secretary of Education Arne Duncan, McDonald's President and COO Don Thompson, Harvard professor Henry Louis Gates, and Major League Baseball star Gary Sheffield.

== Urban Prep Charter Academy for Young Men - West Campus ==
Urban Prep Academy for Young Men (West Campus)

Location
- 1326 W. 14th Place; Chicago, Illinois 60608; United States

Information
- School type: All-male; Public; High school
- Opened: 2009
- Principal: Cory L. Cain
- Grades: 9–12
- Athletics conference: Chicago Public League

=== History ===
Urban Prep Academy for Young Men - East Garfield Park was granted approval to operate as a Contract school by the Chicago Board of Education in 2008. The school opened welcomed its first freshman class in September 2009. After operating in a Chicago Public Schools facility shared with Willa Cather Elementary School for two years, East Garfield Park was rechristened as Urban Prep Academies - West Campus and moved to its present location at 1326 W 14th Pl in the fall of 2011. After Illinois Governor Pat Quinn signed a law in the summer of 2009 raising the cap on charter schools, Urban Prep Academies applied to the Chicago Board of Education to convert the school's legal status from Contract School to Charter School. The application was approved in the fall of 2009 for the school to occupy Charter status beginning in the 2010–2011 school year.

== Urban Prep Academy for Young Men - Bronzeville Campus ==
Urban Prep Charter Academy for Young Men (Bronzeville Campus)
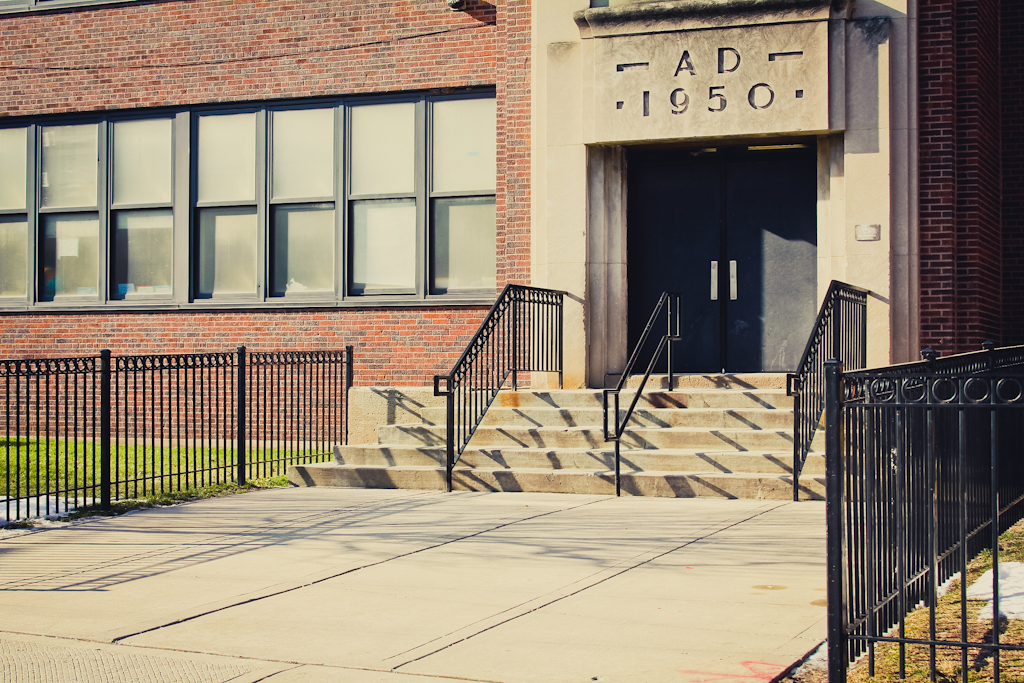
- Main entrance at the South Dearborn Avenue location, 2011.

Location
- 521 E. 35th Street; Chicago, Illinois 60616; United States

Information
- School type: All-male; Charter; Public; High school
- Opened: 2010
- Principal: Joffrey Bywater
- Grades: 9–12
- Athletics conference: Chicago Public League
- Newspaper: Lion's Roar

=== History ===
The South Shore Campus opened in a temporary facility in the North Kenwood/Oakland community area in August 2010, and moved to the location within Chicago Public School's Williams School Complex at 2710 South Dearborn Avenue the following year. The school's leadership consists of a transfer from the Englewood campus; principal Joffrey Bywater. As of 2018, The school is housed in the former Chicago High School of The Arts (ChiArts) building at 521 E. 35th Street.

== Images ==
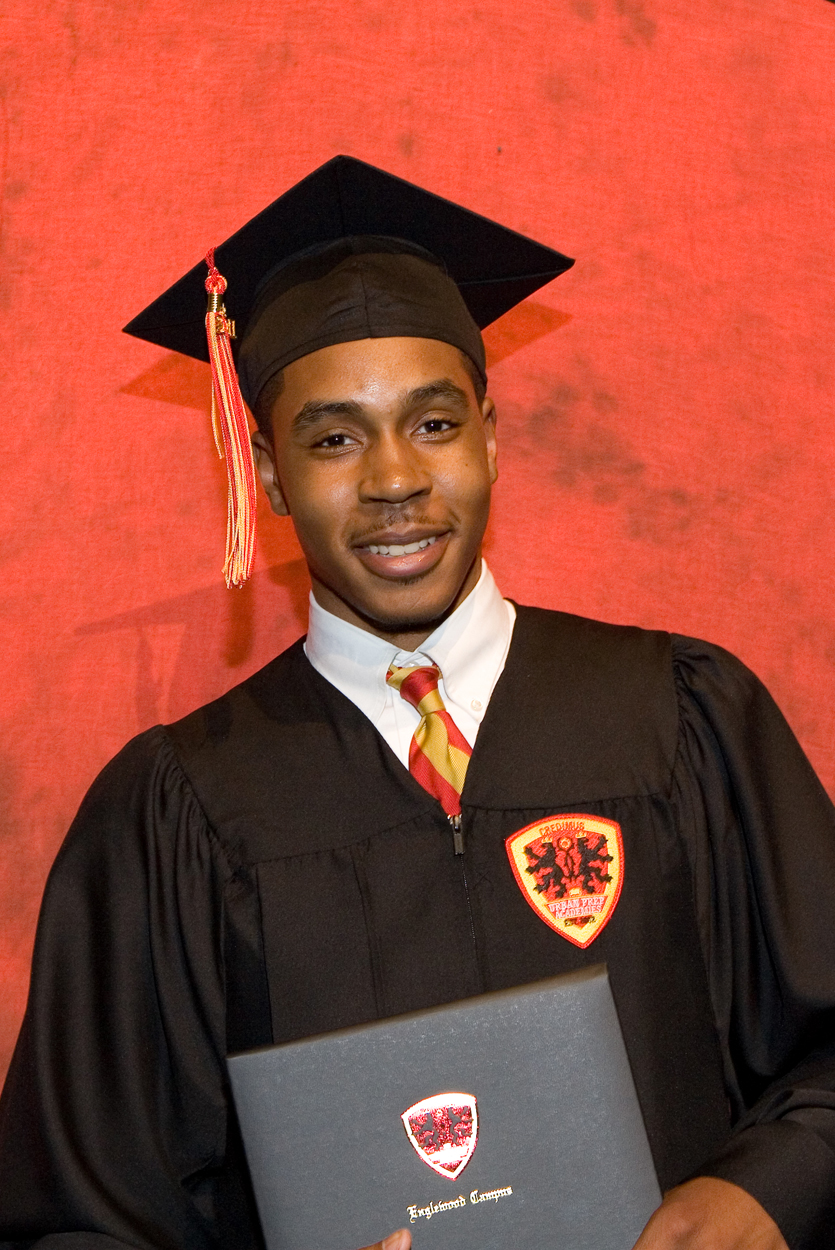
A graduate of Urban Prep, 2011.

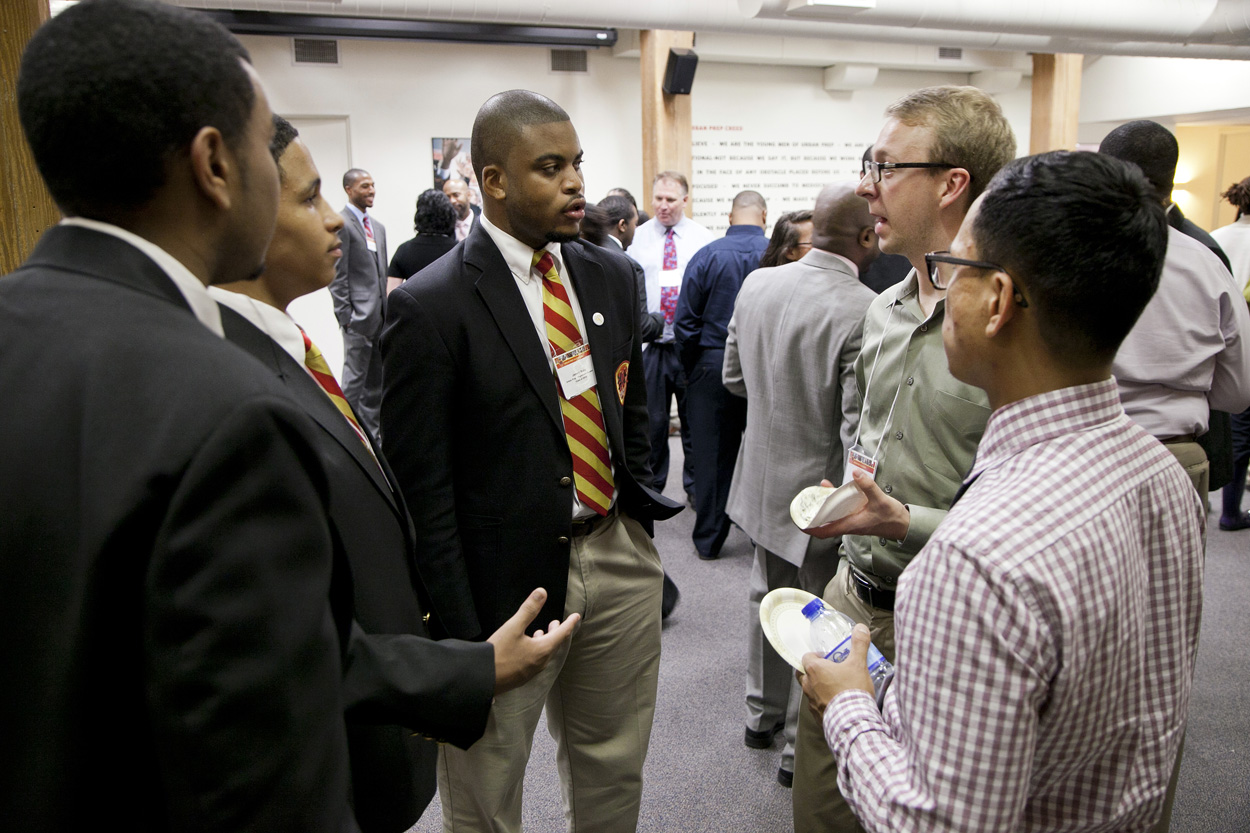
Urban Prep seniors speak with college admissions representatives, 2011.

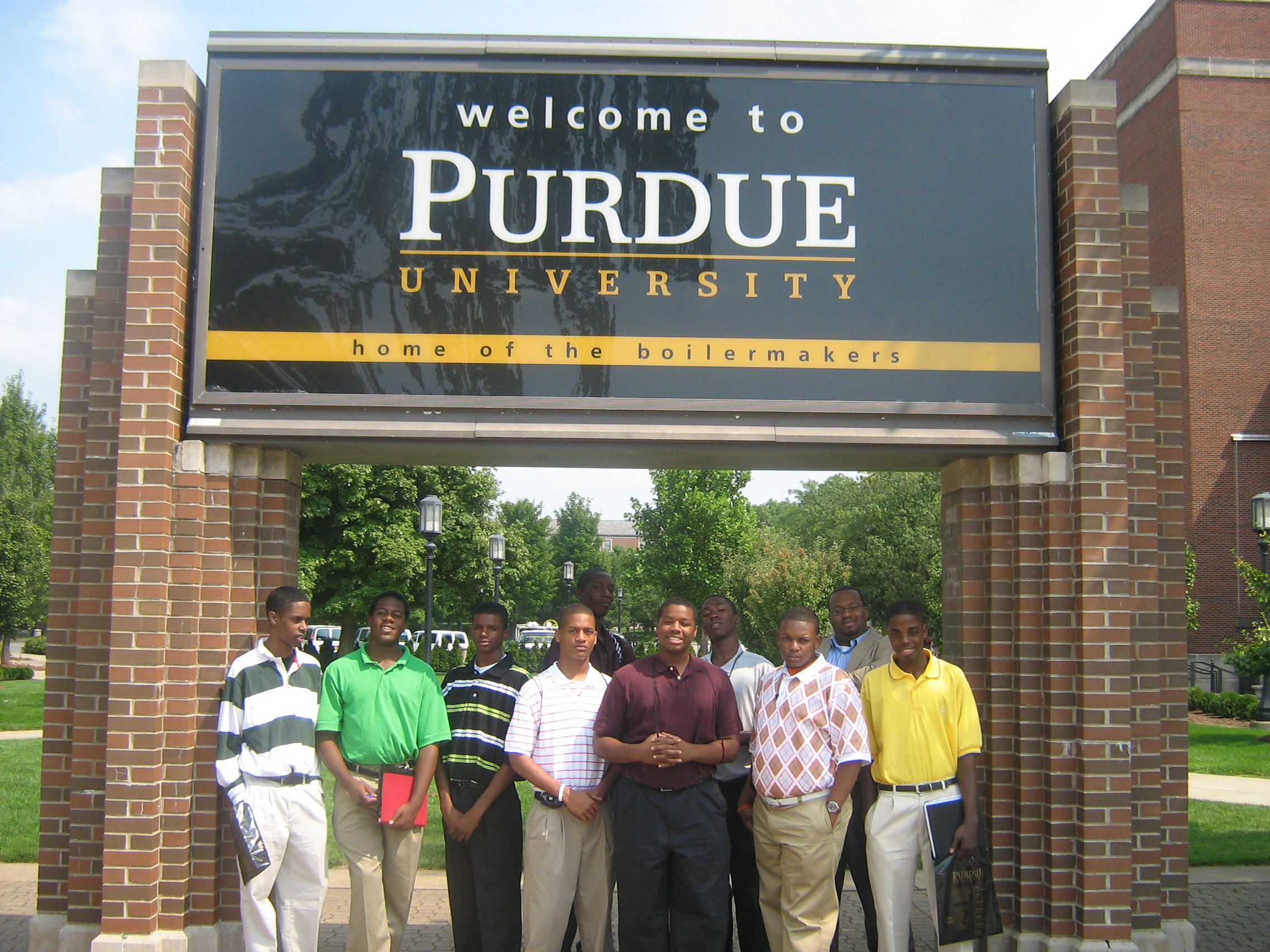
Urban Prep students visit Purdue University, 2011.

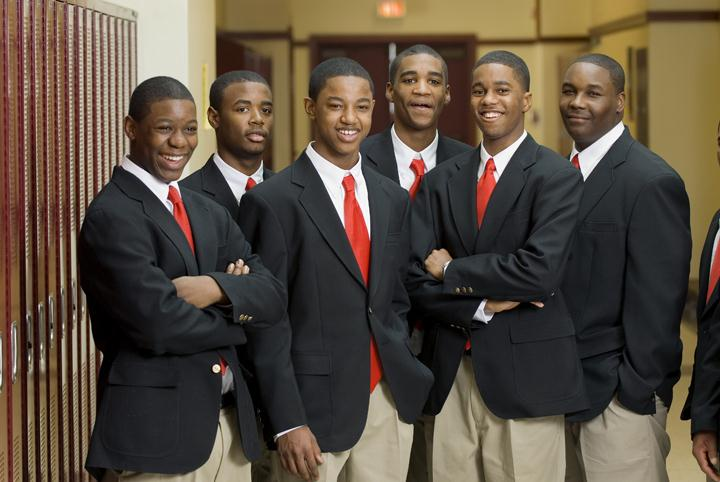
Urban Prep (Englewood) students pose in the hallway, 2011.
