= Barbara Sicherman =

American historian

Academic background
- Education: Swarthmore College; Columbia University

Barbara Sicherman is an American historian and academic who specializes in women's history. She is the William R. Kenan Jr. Professor of American Institutions and Values Emerita at Trinity College in Hartford, Connecticut.

== Education ==
Sicherman earned her B.A. from Swarthmore College and her M.A. and Ph.D. from Columbia University.

== Career ==
Sicherman was a professor at Trinity College from 1982 through 2005. She taught courses on women's history, American culture, and women's studies. She helped establish Trinity's Women's Studies Program and was involved in efforts to increase faculty diversity.

Sicherman is a specialist in women's history and has conducted research on topics such as medical and psychiatric history, women's biography, and the role of reading in women's lives. She is the author of several books, including Alice Hamilton: A Life in Letters, Well-Read Lives: How Books Inspired a Generation of American Women, and The Quest for Mental Health in America, 1880-1917. She is also a co-editor of the biographical dictionary Notable American Women: The Modern Period.

Sicherman has published articles and chapters on a variety of topics, including reproductive rights and women's reading habits. She was a Bunting Fellow at Radcliffe from 1973 to 1974, and a Guggenheim fellow in 1996. She served on the board of the Harriet Beecher Stowe Center for many years and was a volunteer tutor at Literacy Volunteers of Greater Hartford.

== Selected works ==
=== Books ===
- Alice Hamilton: A Life in Letters. Cambridge: Harvard University Press, 1984; reissued by University of Illinois Press, 2003.
- Well-Read Lives: How Books Inspired a Generation of American Women. Chapel Hill: University of North Carolina Press, 2010.
- The Quest for Mental Health in America, 1880–1917. New York: Arno Press, 1980.
- Notable American Women: The Modern Period, ed. with Carol Hurd Green. Cambridge: Harvard University Press, 1980.
