= Susan B. Anthony abortion dispute =

Susan B. Anthony image and quoted text, used by Feminists for Life to portray her as anti-abortion. The quote deals with child custody in estate law rather than abortion.

Susan B. Anthony was a leader of the American women's suffrage movement whose position on abortion has been the subject of a modern-day dispute. The dispute has primarily been between anti-abortion activists, who say that Anthony expressed opposition to abortion, and acknowledged authorities in her life and work who say that she did not.

Since about 1989, some anti-abortion activists have asserted that Anthony was anti-abortion and would support that side of the modern debate over the issue. A prominent supporter of this viewpoint has been Marjorie Dannenfelser, president of the Susan B. Anthony List, a political organization that seeks to end abortion through the electoral process. Others include Cat Clark and Rachel MacNair of the Feminists for Life, a feminist and anti-abortion organization.

Scholars, especially Ann Dexter Gordon, have disagreed strongly, saying that Anthony showed little interest in the issue of abortion and never expressed opposition to it. Gordon led the Elizabeth Cady Stanton and Susan B. Anthony Papers project, a 9-year academic undertaking to collect and document 14,000 materials written by those two leaders of the women's rights movement, and she published a six-volume collection of their works. Others on this side of the dispute include Lynn Sherr, author of a biography of Anthony; Harper D. Ward, a researcher associated with the National Susan B. Anthony Museum and House; and Tracy Thomas, a law professor.

The dispute largely revolves around statements that are alleged to have been made by Anthony in opposition to abortion. Scholars say these statements either were not made by Anthony, are not about abortion or have been taken out of context.

== Background ==
Susan B. Anthony and her signature

Susan B. Anthony (1820–1906) is known primarily for her leadership in the women's suffrage movement, a cause to which she devoted most of her life. The Nineteenth Amendment, which guarantees the right of women to vote, has been called the Susan B. Anthony Amendment because of her efforts to achieve its passage. She was raised by abolitionist Quaker parents, later attending Unitarian churches and becoming an agnostic. As a young woman she also worked in the temperance movement and as a speaker and organizer for the American Anti-Slavery Society. In 1979 she was honored as the first American woman to be represented on U.S. currency, the Susan B. Anthony dollar.

In 1982, the Elizabeth Cady Stanton and Susan B. Anthony Papers project was initiated at Rutgers University to collect and document all available materials written by Anthony and her co-worker Elizabeth Cady Stanton. Under the leadership of Ann D. Gordon, it gathered some 14,000 documents, more than doubling the sources that previously had been available. Gordon said she noticed in 1989 that some anti-abortion organizations were stating that Susan B. Anthony opposed abortion.

Rosemary Bottcher, an anti-abortion activist with Feminists for Life (FFL), wrote in June 1989, "The early feminists believed that by enhancing the status of women, they could greatly reduce the incidence of abortion. Susan B. Anthony wrote that 'We must reach the root of the evil...' " Two months later, Rachel MacNair, the president of FFL, was quoted saying, "Susan B. Anthony didn't think there was a contradiction" in the idea of being a feminist who is against abortion rights. FFL, a feminist anti-abortion organization that was founded in the early 1970s, said in its mission statement that it, "continues the tradition of early American feminists such as Susan B. Anthony, who opposed abortion". The Susan B. Anthony List (SBA List), which was founded by MacNair in 1992 as a political group with the goal of ending abortion in the United States by supporting anti-abortion politicians, especially women, described Anthony as "an outspoken critic of abortion". Some conservative anti-abortion organizations, such as Concerned Women for America, have made similar statements.

Gordon said the belief that Anthony opposed abortion was "far-fetched", describing it as "what historians call an 'invented memory'—history without foundation in the evidence but with modern utility". She and others began to challenge this idea in public forums such as the Washington Post. Anti-abortion leaders such as Marjorie Dannenfelser, president of the SBA List, used that newspaper and other forums to support their side of this issue.

== Arguments ==
A 2006 article by Allison Stevens for Women's eNews said "a scholarly disagreement ...is growing into a heated skirmish over the famous suffragist's position on reproductive rights." Stevens said pro-choice activists were "outraged over what they say is an unproven claim and concerned that their heroine is being appropriated by a community led by the very people Anthony battled during her lifetime: social conservatives".

A week after the Stevens article appeared, author and columnist Stacy Schiff wrote, "There is no question that [Anthony] deplored the practice of abortion, as did every one of her colleagues in the suffrage movement", but Schiff criticized the practice of using "history plucked from both text and time" to create "Anthony the pro-lifer". Schiff said that abortion in the 19th century, unlike today, was a very dangerous and unpredictable procedure. She concluded, "The bottom line is that we cannot possibly know what Anthony would make of today's debate" over the abortion issue, because "the terms do not translate".

Gordon and others strongly disagreed with the idea that Anthony opposed abortion. Gordon, who published a six-volume collection of the works of Susan B. Anthony and her co-worker Elizabeth Cady Stanton, wrote that Anthony "never voiced an opinion about the sanctity of fetal life ... and she never voiced an opinion about using the power of the state to require that pregnancies be brought to term". Gordon said that, for Anthony, the issue of abortion was "a political hot potato", one to avoid; it distracted from her main goal of gaining women the vote. Gordon said the suffrage movement in the 19th century held political and social views—"secularism, the separation of church and state, and women's self-ownership" (women's autonomy)—that do not fit with the modern anti-abortion platform.

In 1999, Ken Burns released a film about the lives of Susan B. Anthony and Elizabeth Cady Stanton called Not for Ourselves Alone. The SBA List objected in a press release to Burns' portrayal of these two women, saying that "to document Anthony's and Stanton's important work for women's rights without mentioning their abhorrence of abortion is incredibly unjust, considering how passionate they were on the subject." Gordon responded, "It is reasonable to ask, if these nineteenth-century women were passionate and outspoken in their abhorrence of abortion, why did they never do anything about it?"

Christine Stansell, a professor of history at the University of Chicago and author of a book on the history of feminism, said, "neither Anthony nor any other nineteenth-century women's rights reformer led an anti-abortion movement, proposed or supported laws to criminalize abortion, or saw abortion as a political problem."

Gloria Feldt, a former head of Planned Parenthood, said of Anthony that "there's absolutely nothing in anything that she ever said or did that would indicate she was anti-abortion."

In early 2007, Cat Clark, an editor of FFL's quarterly magazine, acknowledged that Anthony spent little time on the subject of abortion, but cited FFL researcher Mary Krane Derr who said Anthony's "stance on abortion" was integral to "her commitment to undo gender oppression".

Law professor Tracy Thomas, writing in the Seattle University Law Review, said the "strategy of creating a narrative of feminist history against abortion" was developed by Feminists for Life in the early 1990s. Thomas published a lengthy analysis of what she considered to be inaccuracies in that narrative, saying, "... the narrative is simply not true. Sound bites that have been excised from history are taken out of context to convey a meaning not originally intended." She quoted Annette Ravinsky, a former vice president of the FFL, as saying in published comments, "I really wish my former colleagues would stop twisting the words of dead people to make them mean something they don't ... The early leaders of the women's movement were not against women controlling their bodies."

In May 2010, Sarah Palin addressed a meeting of the SBA List, saying Anthony was one of her heroes, and that Palin's own opposition to abortion rights was influenced by her "feminist foremothers". She said "Organizations like the Susan B. Anthony List are returning the woman's movement back to its original roots, back to what it was all about in the beginning. You remind us of the earliest leaders of the woman's rights movement: They were pro-life." In response to this, journalist Lynn Sherr, author of Failure is Impossible: Susan B. Anthony in Her Own Words, joined with Gordon to write an opinion piece for The Washington Post. They said: "We have read every single word that this very voluble—and endlessly political—woman left behind. Our conclusion: Anthony spent no time on the politics of abortion. It was of no interest to her, despite living in a society (and a family) where women aborted unwanted pregnancies." Sherr and Gordon said that their argument "is not over abortion rights. Rather it is about the erosion of accuracy in history and journalism."

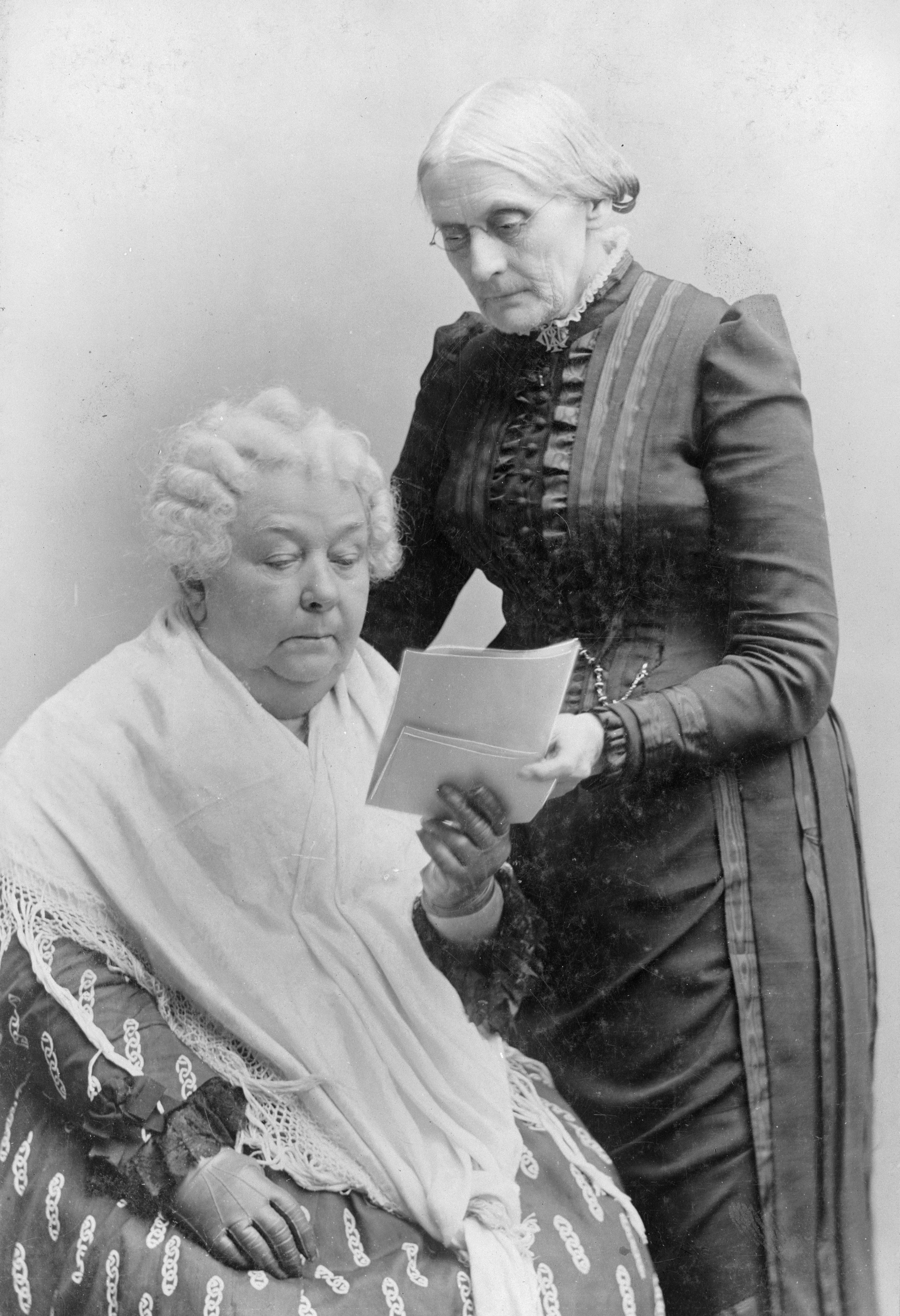
Women's rights activists Elizabeth Cady Stanton (seated) and Susan B. Anthony

SBA List president Marjorie Dannenfelser published her response to Sherr and Gordon, saying that their conclusion "that abortion was nowhere on [Anthony's] radar" was "unfounded on many levels". She said that in Anthony's day, "abortion wasn't even a hot political issue ...Abortion simply wasn't up for debate at a time when society itself was firmly against the practice." Thomas disputed Dannenfelser's assertion that abortion was not a political issue during that period, and she disputed the idea that society firmly opposed abortion. Thomas cited three academic histories, including a history of abortion by James Mohr, who discussed what he called the doctrine of quickening, the belief that it was legally and morally permissible to terminate pregnancy prior to the perception of fetal movement. Mohr said this belief was almost universal during the first decades of the 1800s and was pervasive through the 1870s. As a result, he said, "women believed themselves to be carrying inert non-beings prior to quickening", and if a woman missed her period, an early sign of pregnancy, either she or her doctor could take steps to "restore menstrual flow". Mohr said there was a surge in abortions after 1840 and that a study of abortion in New York City published in 1868 concluded that there was approximately one abortion there for every four live births.

Dannenfelser said that while the anti-abortion cause was not "the issue that earned Susan B. Anthony her stripes in American history books, historians would be wrong to conclude that Anthony was agnostic on the issue of abortion". She quoted Anthony's business partner, Elizabeth Cady Stanton, as saying, "When we consider that women are treated as property, it is degrading to women that we should treat our children as property to be disposed of as we see fit." Attempts to authenticate this quote, however, have been unsuccessful. After Thomas notified the FFL in 2011 that she could not locate the source for this alleged quote, the FFL acknowledged the problem by saying that, "Earlier generations of pro-life feminists informed us that these words were written by Elizabeth Cady Stanton, in a letter tucked into Julia Ward Howe's diary on October 16, 1873," but that they could not locate the letter. The FFL said that Howe's diary entry for that date indicated that she had argued about infanticide with Stanton, who, according to Howe, "excused infanticide on the grounds that women did not want to bring moral monsters into the world, and said that these acts were regulated by natural law. I differed from her strongly". Thomas added that the disagreement occurred during public discussion at a women's conference in New York City.

Thomas said it is a mistake to believe that the views of Anthony and Stanton are compatible with those of the modern anti-abortion movement. She called attention to the case of Hester Vaughn, who was sentenced to hang for killing her newborn child in 1868. An editorial in The Revolution, a newspaper owned by Anthony and co-edited by Stanton, described Vaughn as a "poor, ignorant, friendless and forlorn girl who had killed her newborn child because she knew not what else to do with it" and said that Vaughn's execution would be "a far more horrible infanticide than was the killing of her child". The Revolution launched a campaign in Vaughn's defense, which was conducted largely by the Working Women's Association (WWA), an organization formed in the offices of The Revolution with Anthony's participation.

The National Susan B. Anthony Museum and House, located in Anthony's former home in Rochester, New York, expressed concern about the association of Anthony's name with what it considered to be misleading political campaign material produced by the Susan B. Anthony List. In a press release the museum said, "The List's assertions about Susan B. Anthony's position on abortion are historically inaccurate." Deborah Hughes, president of the museum, said, "People are outraged by their actions, causing harm to Anthony's name and the mission of our Museum." Harper D. Ward, in a research article published by the Susan B. Anthony Museum and House, said, "Anthony's long career of public speaking provided many occasions for her to speak about abortion if she chose to do so. The plain fact, however, is that Susan B. Anthony almost never referred to abortion, and when she did, she said nothing to indicate that she wanted it banned by law."

=== Quotes ===
Anthony wrote very little about abortion. The few existing quotes that are cited by anti-abortion organizations have been disputed by Anthony scholars and other commentators who say the quotes are misleading, taken out of context, or misattributed.

==== "Guilty?" ====
Some anti-abortion groups cite as Anthony's own words an anonymous essay entitled "Marriage and Maternity" published in 1869 in The Revolution, a newspaper owned for two years by Anthony and edited by fellow women's rights activists Elizabeth Cady Stanton and Parker Pillsbury. The essay is against abortion and the societal problems which cause it, but the author believes any proposed law prohibiting abortion would fail to "reach the root of the evil, and destroy it". The cited text includes this admonition against abortion:

Guilty? Yes, no matter what the motive, love of ease, or a desire to save from suffering the unborn innocent, the woman is awfully guilty who commits the deed. It will burden her conscience in life, it will burden her soul in death; but oh! thrice guilty is he who, for selfish gratification, heedless of her prayers, indifferent to her fate, drove her to the desperation which impelled her to the crime.

The piece was signed simply "A." Because it was published in The Revolution, Dannenfelser wrote that "most logical people would agree, then, that writings signed by 'A.' in a paper that Anthony funded and published were a reflection of her own opinions." Gordon, whose project at Rutgers has examined 14,000 documents related to Stanton and Anthony, said, "Susan B. Anthony has become their unwitting antiabortion poster child based largely on an article she did not write ... For the occasional articles Anthony wrote, she signed 'S.B.A.,' just as she signed the postscripts in her vast correspondence. 'Marriage and Maternity' is signed only 'A,' a shorthand Anthony never used." Derr said Anthony was known to sign "S.B.A." and was affectionately referred to as "Miss A." by others.

In support of her opinion that Anthony wrote this article, Dannenfelser said, "Anthony published many articles under a simple pseudonym, 'A.'" in The Revolution. Ward disputed this, saying, "That statement is completely false. There are only eight items in The Revolution that were signed that way, and none of them can reasonably be attributed to Anthony." Ward listed issue and page numbers for over sixty items in The Revolution that were signed "S.B.A." or "Susan B. Anthony" and provided links to scans of articles by "A." Ward said that one of the articles by "A." disagreed with an editorial in The Revolution, and, in a later issue, the editors addressed its author as "Mr. A.", making it clear that this "A." was not Susan B. Anthony. Ward analyzed the other seven articles by "A." and concluded that in all cases their contents do not match Anthony's known beliefs or interests, including two that deal with a technical point of machinery and one that challenged the competence of the U.S. Patent Office.

Ward said the fact that the article by "A." that disapproves of abortion "includes fervently religious language ('... thunder in her ear, "Whoso defileth the body defileth the temple of the Holy Ghost!"')" is a sure sign that it was not written by Anthony, who avoided such religiosity." Ward cited Elizabeth Cady Stanton, Anthony's close friend, who described Anthony as an agnostic. Saying that The Revolution "published a large number of articles that were contributed by its readers on a variety of topics, many of whom signed themselves anonymously, often with a single initial", Ward listed a sampling of articles that were signed with single letters in addition to "A", such as "The Working Women's Convention" by "B", "Woman as Soldier" by "C", and so on through much of the alphabet.

Responding to the equating of Anthony's beliefs with those voiced in The Revolution, Gordon said that people "have a hard time wrapping their minds around the fact that The Revolution was a paper of debate—presenting both sides of an issue". Ward emphasized this point by quoting The Revolution's editorial policy on this matter: "[T]hose who write for our columns are responsible only for what appears under their own names. Hence if old Abolitionists and Slaveholders, Republicans and Democrats, Presbyterians and Universalists, Saints, Sinners and the Beecher family find themselves side by side in writing up the question of Woman Suffrage, they must pardon each other's differences on all other points."

Referring to the "Marriage and Maternity" article, which identifies uncaring husbands as the "thrice guilty" party, Schiff says "what is generally not mentioned [by anti-abortion organizations] is that the essay argues against an anti-abortion law; its author did not believe legislation would resolve the issue of unwanted pregnancy." Gordon, referring to the article's many scriptural quotes and appeals to God, says that its style does not fit with Anthony's "known beliefs".

Speaking for the FFL, Clark said, "Feminists for Life is cautious about the attribution of 'Marriage & Maternity.' In FFL materials, it is simply said to have appeared in Susan B. Anthony's publication, The Revolution."

==== "Sweeter even" ====
FFL College Outreach poster

The poster text shown in the box below comes from a speech by another woman, who said that Anthony spoke "after this fashion" during a conversation. However, Anthony was referring to laws about wills, not abortion. Anthony never fought for laws restricting abortion, and she never "fought for the right to life".

another anti-choice fanatic

Sweeter even than to have had the joy of caring for children of my own has it been to me to help bring about a better state of things for mothers generally, so their unborn little ones could not be willed away from them.
—Susan B. Anthony

The woman who fought for the right to vote also fought for the right to life. We proudly continue her legacy.

— feministsforlife.org

Frances Willard, president of the Woman's Christian Temperance Union, gave a speech on October 4, 1888, in which she described a conversation that included Anthony's reaction to a "leading publicist" who asked her why she, with such a generous heart, had never been a wife or mother. Willard said that Anthony replied "after this fashion":

I thank you kind sir, for what I take to be the highest compliment, but sweeter even than to have had the joy of caring for children of my own has it been to me to help bring about a better state of things for mothers generally, so that their unborn little ones could not be willed away from them.

These words have been presented by both the SBA List and FFL to indicate Anthony's stance on abortion. Dannenfelser of the SBA List connected these words to abortion in 2010: "in case there's still lingering doubt about where Susan B. Anthony's convictions lie, her words to Frances Willard in 1889 speak for themselves". Tracy Clark-Flory disagreed, writing on Salon.com that they constitute "a statement that can conveniently be taken to mean any number of things".

Anti-abortion feminist Derr contextualized Anthony's words not to abortion but to Anthony's opposition to a law which held that, if a child was unborn at the time of its father's death, custody of the newborn infant could be taken away from the mother if there was a guardian appointed in the father's will. Ward similarly said that Anthony was referring not to abortion here but to laws that enabled the father to "will away" the children of the family to someone other than their mother after his death. Ward supported this with a quote from Matilda Joslyn Gage, one of Anthony's co-workers, who criticized existing laws by which, "the father is assumed to be the sole owner of the children, who can be bound out, willed or given away without the consent or even the knowledge of the mother."

Ward said that in any case these words cannot be characterized as a quote because Willard made it clear that she was not attempting to reproduce exactly what Anthony had said. Ward said that Willard's reconstruction of the conversation is unrealistic because Willard, "has Anthony speaking in a sentimental and ingratiating way that is completely unlike the way she actually spoke".

After these words were published by Derr in a 1995 book and in FFL's own journal in 1998, they were used in 2000 by FFL in a promotional poster, one of eight produced for college campuses, alongside an assertion that Anthony was "another anti-choice fanatic", leading the reader to an abortion-related interpretation of them.

==== Social Purity ====
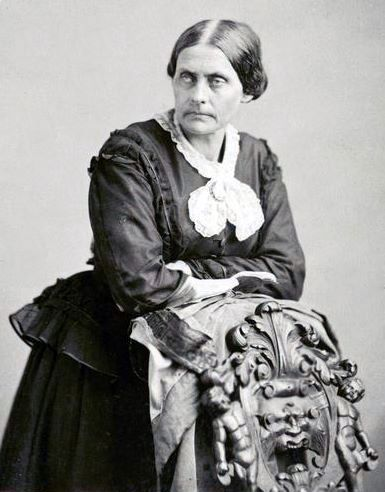
Susan B. Anthony

"Social Purity" was the name of an anti-alcohol and pro-suffrage speech given repeatedly by Anthony in the 1870s. After naming alcohol abuse as a major social evil and estimating that there were 600,000 American men who were drunkards, Anthony said that the liquor traffic must be fought with "one earnest, energetic, persistent force". She continued with a sentence that mentioned abortion:

The prosecutions on our courts for breach of promise, divorce, adultery, bigamy, seduction, rape; the newspaper reports every day of every year of scandals and outrages, of wife murders and paramour shooting, of abortions and infanticides, are perpetual reminders of men's incapacity to cope successfully with this monster evil of society."

Later in the speech, Anthony mentioned abortion again:

The true relation of the sexes never can be attained until woman is free and equal with man. Neither in the making nor executing of the laws regulating these relations has woman ever had the slightest voice. The statutes for marriage and divorce, for adultery, breach of promise, seduction, rape, bigamy, abortion, infanticide—all were made by men. They, alone, decide who are guilty of violating these laws and what shall be their punishment, with judge, jury and advocate all men, with no woman's voice heard in our courts.

Clark described this speech as one in which Anthony was "more explicit" about abortion. She said that "this speech clearly represents abortion as a symptom of the problems faced by women, especially when subjected 'to the tyranny of men's appetites and passions.'"

Ward said this speech cannot reasonably be interpreted as an indication that Anthony opposed abortion, saying, "Listing abortion as one of the consequences of alcohol abuse is not the same as calling for it to be outlawed." Ward said that Anthony also included divorce in that list of consequences and yet later in the speech "spoke caustically of those who opposed it, saying, 'We have had quite enough of the sickly sentimentalism which counts the woman a heroine and a saint for remaining the wife of a drunken, immoral husband.'"

==== "She will rue the day" ====
According to Gordon and Sherr, the only clear reference to abortion in writings known to be Anthony's came in her diary in a passage that was discovered by Gordon. Anthony wrote in 1876 that she visited her brother and learned that her sister-in-law had aborted her pregnancy. "Things did not go well", say Gordon and Sherr, and her sister-in-law was bedridden. Anthony wrote, "Sister Annie in bed—been sick for a month—tampering with herself—& was freed this A.M. what ignorance & lack of self-government the world is filled with." Three days later, Anthony wrote, "Sister Annie better—but looks very slim—she will rue the day she forces nature". According to Gordon, the phrase "tampering with herself" refers to "inducing an abortion".

Gordon and Sherr wrote, "Clearly Anthony did not applaud her sister-in-law's action, but the notation is ambiguous. Is it the act of abortion that will be regretted? Or is it being bedridden, the risk taken with one's own life?" Moreover, Gordon and Sherr wrote, there is no indication in the quote that Anthony considered abortion a social or political issue rather than a personal one, that she passionately hated it, or that she was active against it. Ward, noting that women who induced their own abortions did so with primitive and dangerous techniques, said this passage, "in no way indicates that Anthony was in favor of laws to prohibit medical professionals from providing abortions".

==== "Active Antagonism" ====
In 2016 Dannenfelser wrote an article called "'Active Antagonism' on International Women's Day" that was published in The Hill, a political newspaper and website. In it, she wrote, "Susan B. Anthony, the founding mother of the movement for women's rights, said that abortion filled her with 'indignation, and awakened active antagonism.'"

Calling this another instance in which "Dannenfelser has disregarded the facts", Ward responded by saying, "Anthony said nothing of the sort. Elizabeth Blackwell wrote those words, which appear on page 30 of her memoirs." The full quotation from Blackwell, who was the first woman to receive a medical degree in the United States, reads: "The gross perversion and destruction of motherhood by the abortionist filled me with indignation, and awakened active antagonism."

== Susan B. Anthony Birthplace Museum ==
In August 2006, Carol Crossed, an anti-abortion feminist and advisory board member of the SBA List, purchased the house in Adams, Massachusetts, where Anthony was born. The house was to be managed by Feminists for Life of America. Crossed transformed the house into the Susan B. Anthony Birthplace Museum, which opened in 2010. The museum's mission includes "raising public awareness" of Anthony's "wide-ranging legacy" including her being "a pioneering feminist and suffragist as well as a noteworthy figure in the abolitionist, pro-life and temperance movements of the 19th century" (emphasis added).

A local newspaper said the "she will rue the day" quote is displayed in the museum, though none of the others are. Among the exhibits is one on 19th century activism against Restellism, a euphemism for abortion, in reference to Madame Restell, one of many who sold abortifacients in the 19th century. Anthony's newspaper, The Revolution, refused to publish advertisements for abortifacients. According to the local reporter, the display implies that the rejection of advertisements frames Anthony's personal views about abortion, though she "never specifically states her position".

At its opening, the museum was leafleted by protesters who said the museum's leadership was "inferring upon [Anthony] an unproven historical stance". The protesters said that the directors were using the museum to put forward an anti-abortion agenda. Crossed responded by saying, "the pro-life views expressed in Anthony's newspaper, The Revolution, will not be excluded from the exhibition. This vision represented a very small part of Anthony's life, and while it will be presented, it will not be an overwhelming theme of the birthplace. Anthony's own anti-abortion stance is mentioned in just one of the museum's ten exhibits."

== In popular culture ==
On January 14, 2017, Saturday Night Live broadcast a skit in which Susan B. Anthony, portrayed by Kate McKinnon, says "Abortion is murder!"

On February 15, 2018, the White House under President Donald Trump issued a Susan B. Anthony Day proclamation, claiming that she was anti-abortion.
