= Feminists for Life =

Non-governmental organization

Feminists for Life of America
- Abbreviation: FFL
- Formation: 1972
- Type: NGO
- Legal status: 501(c)(3) not-for-profit
- Purpose: Advocacy
- Location: Alexandria, Virginia
- President: Serrin M. Foster
- Website: feministsforlife.org

Feminists for Life of America (FFL) is a non-profit, anti-abortion feminist, non-governmental organization (NGO). Established in 1972, and now based in Alexandria, Virginia, the organization publishes a biannual magazine, The American Feminist, and aims to reach young women, college students in particular.

== Methods ==
FFL uses "pro-women" language in order to convince women that abortion is "immoral". They use the "pro-woman" term as a substitute for "feminist", while at the same time opposing mainstream feminism. FFL holds that abortion is antithetical to feminism. Pat Goltz argued that the legalization of abortion allowed sexually exploitative men to avoid responsibilities such as paying for child support. FFL argues that abortion comes from gender inequality. In response to Roe v. Wade, Catherine Callaghan made several claims, including that abortion causes bodily injury to women "in a third to a half of the cases", and that the Supreme Court legalized abortion because they "hate poor and unwed mothers". Professor Kelsy Kretschmer said these claims are unsubstantiated, but that the FFL uses such claims to undermine the idea that legal abortion is a feminist "victory".

== History ==
=== Origins ===
Feminists for Life was founded by Pat Goltz and Cathy Callaghan in Ohio in 1972. Goltz and Callaghan met in a judo club on the campus of Ohio State University, where Callaghan was a tenured professor of linguistics. In 1974, Goltz was expelled from the Columbus, Ohio, chapter of the National Organization for Women (NOW) for arguing that abortion violated feminist principles, although she and Callaghan were not expelled from national NOW membership.

=== Mid-1970s ===
After five years as president of FFL, Goltz retired. In 1977, organizational management was moved to Wisconsin. The group's activities focused on being a presence at both anti-abortion and feminist events, distributing literature, and writing letters to various publications. A national workshop that became an annual conference for anti-abortion feminists was launched during this time. Many members supported both the Equal Rights Amendment and a Human Life Amendment as "complementary in their concern for human life".

=== 1980s ===
In June 1984, at the annual FFL meeting in Omaha, Nebraska, peace activist Rachel MacNair was elected president of FFL. Out of her office at a crisis pregnancy center in Kansas City, Missouri, she ran FFL for ten years. Under MacNair, FFL began to receive more national exposure through media interviews, involvement in a broad spectrum of anti-abortion issues, and invitations to speak at anti-abortion events. By 1989, FFL was reporting that their research had found statements against abortion that had been made by early feminists. Some of these findings were challenged by specialists in women's history, especially in the case of Susan B. Anthony, leading to a public dispute about her views on abortion. During 1992, MacNair also worked toward founding the Susan B. Anthony List as a political action committee working against abortion through electing anti-abortion candidates.

=== 1990s ===
In the 1990s, FFL worked within the anti-abortion movement but they used "pro-woman" language to establish a "feminist" identity separate from both feminists and anti-abortion activists. Professor Laury Oaks noted that, in practice, their actions revealed a "pro-life stance" from which they attacked mainstream feminism. They backed laws which limited access to abortion. FFL did not usually state that their group's ultimate goal was to outlaw abortion, but they supported radical activism in Operation Rescue's effort to blockade abortion clinics by filing amicus curiae briefs in the 1993 Supreme Court case Bray v. Alexandria Women's Health Clinic. FFL also supported two attempts in the 1990s to enact a "partial-birth" abortion ban, both of which were vetoed by President Bill Clinton.

In 1994–1995 after MacNair stepped down as leader, FFL's office was moved to Washington, D.C., and reorganized as a more politically pragmatic operation under Serrin Foster. Foster began in 1994 to visit college campuses where she spoke out against abortion. This effort was expanded in 1996 to a college outreach campaign involving all of FFL. In 1999, the FFL proposed that the Violence Against Women Act should not allow abortions of pregnancies from rape.

=== 2000s ===
In mid-2005, the Woodward Building, which housed the offices of Feminists for Life, the National Organization for Women, and The Hill newspaper, among others, closed to be converted into apartments.

=== Contraception ===
FFL states that its members and supporters "hold a broad spectrum of opinions" about contraception, with FFL taking no official position on the matter. Prominent FFL member Sarah Palin stated in 2006, "I'm pro-contraception, and I think kids who may not hear about it at home should hear about it in other avenues".

== The American Feminist ==
FFL publishes a biannual magazine called The American Feminist which includes original and reprinted articles.

== College Outreach program ==
Susan B. Anthony image and quoted text, used by FFL to portray her as "anti-choice". The quote deals with child custody in estate law rather than abortion.

In 1994, Foster began to visit college campuses to deliver her speech "The Feminist Case Against Abortion". FFL established a college outreach program in 1996.

For a college audience, FFL designed a promotional campaign that challenged abortion rights advocacy and provided information for pregnant women, not including how to obtain an abortion. FFL members created several kits for student activists, a kit for residential advisers and psychological counselors, a feminist history kit for libraries, and challenging ads for college audiences, in addition to the resources available through FFL's website. Two of the eight "Question Abortion" posters offered in 2000 touched upon political issues, one of these saying "No law can make the wrong choice right". One poster used an image of Susan B. Anthony and an out-of-context paraphrased quote determined two years earlier by FFL historian Mary Krane Derr to be about estate law, not abortion. Other posters recast choice as the "imperative to have an abortion", or implied that life was better before abortion rights, back when abortion was illegal. Other FFL posters reveal an anti-abortion stance even in case of rape or incest.

One of the goals of the college program is to get members of college campuses to help advocate for student parenting as a way to reduce the prevalence of abortion. This is an example of "common ground" advocacy. Both sides of the abortion issues are coming together in attempt to work together to find solutions for other issues relating to abortion.

FFL believes that there should be daycares on college campuses', dorm housing for women with children, and maternity coverage in health insurances. They blame abortion rights activists for failing to secure provisions that would help make motherhood an easier choice for women.

== References to 19th century feminists ==
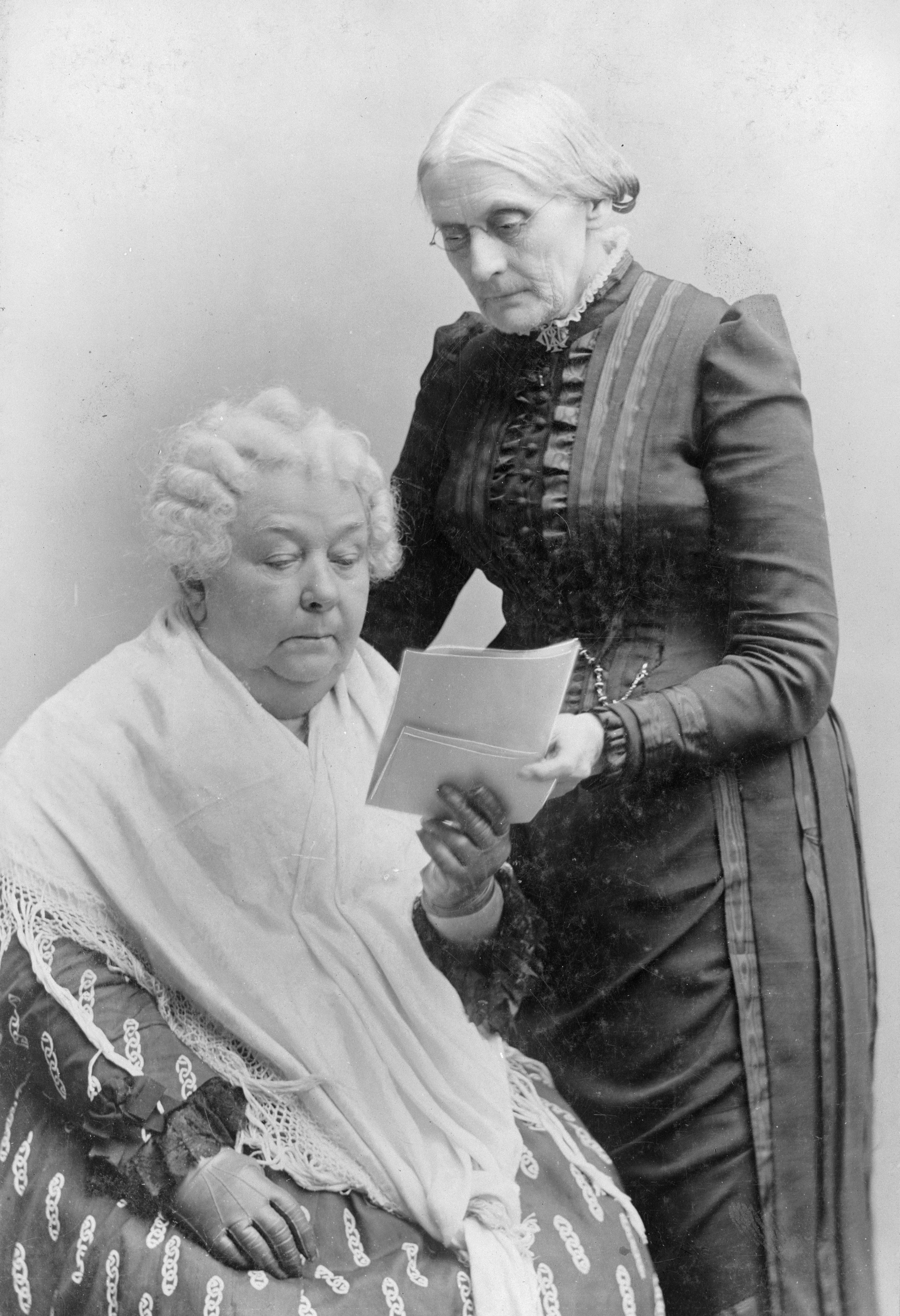
Suffragists Elizabeth Cady Stanton (seated) and Susan B. Anthony

FFL's website features what are said to be quotes from several early feminists, some of which have been challenged by specialists in women's history.

The quotes attributed to Anthony led to a dispute about her views on abortion. Much of the dispute centered on an anonymous article called "Marriage and Maternity" published in 1869 in Anthony's newspaper and signed "A". Anonymously written articles were common in The Revolution, which published a variety of viewpoints. The author of this article used fervent religious language and called abortion "child-murder". Pro-Life Feminism, a book published in 1995 by FFL leaders, said that Susan B. Anthony was the "A" who wrote the article. Ann Dexter Gordon, an academic expert on Anthony, disagreed, saying that Anthony did not sign her writings as "A" and that "many of the ideas expressed in the article clash with her known beliefs." Another article in The Revolution that was signed "A" took issue with one of its editorials, generating a discussion in which the editors referred to its author as "Mr. A."

FFL cites the writings of Stanton as supposedly opposing abortion, using her image many times on posters, flyers and other media. However, Stanton was a radical activist bent on reforming religious and society norms in order to halt the subjugation of women. She stayed out of the American Medical Association-generated debate about enacting laws against abortion, and she never voiced support for the criminalization of abortion or the restriction of women's right to choose. Instead, she advocated that women should always be allowed to choose when to have children, and how many to have – an approach which she called "voluntary motherhood". She assisted in the defense of poor women who were accused of killing their infants after birth, the most famous case being Hester Vaughn. Stanton was consistent in her belief that every woman should be the sole person to choose whether and how often she participated in childbearing. Stanton herself was a likely practitioner of contraception to enable family planning, and she was an opponent of the Comstock laws restricting education about contraception and abortion. Stanton helped organize the Seneca Falls Convention, the first women's rights convention, and she was responsible for putting women's right to vote on the list of convention demands.

Regarding the 1868 "Child Murder" article in the Revolution, from which FFL takes a supposed Stanton quote, Gordon concluded that Stanton was not the author of this article, saying its "flat style" does not match Stanton's. Rather, it was likely written by Revolution co-editor Parker Pillsbury who used that same style in other articles. Thomas said that Pillsbury performed most of the day-to-day editorial activities for the newspaper because Stanton was away on speaking tours for much of the year, sending in her articles by mail.

== Prominent members ==
In 2007, Foster noted that FFL had reached 26,000 members, including the families of women who joined.

During the confirmation hearings for John Roberts, his position on abortion was questioned in light of his wife's FFL membership, leading to intensified focus by the media on the group.

Sarah Palin, the first woman to be nominated by the Republican Party for Vice President of the United States and the first female governor of Alaska, has been a FFL member since 2006.

== Susan B. Anthony birthplace house ==
Carol Crossed, founder of the New York chapter of Democrats for Life of America and former board member of FFL's New York chapter, purchased the Adams, Massachusetts, birthplace of Susan B. Anthony on August 5, 2006. FFL did not own the Susan B. Anthony birthplace, which was opened as the Susan B. Anthony Birthplace Museum on February 14, 2010. Its mission states, "The Museum will highlight the familial and regional influences which shaped Ms. Anthony's early life, by displaying the textiles and furnishings of that period, as well as the literature and other memorabilia associated with her later career". The birthplace is managed by The Susan B. Anthony Birthplace Museum, a non-profit corporation.

== Criticism ==
FFL's anti-abortion positions have been criticized by other feminists. Katha Pollitt, columnist for The Nation, argues that FFL seeks to make abortion illegal in all cases, including those of rape, incest, health, major fetal defects, and "even some abortions most doctors would say were necessary to save the woman's life".

FFL supported the Elizabeth Cady Stanton Pregnant and Parenting Students Act, which was criticized by writer Emily Bazelon in Mother Jones as a "largely hollow 'message bill'". Bazelon opined that the 10 million dollars provided by the bill would be "paltry" when spread nationwide. Bazelon quoted Frances Kissling, leader of the abortion rights organization Catholics for a Free Choice, as calling the bill "not serious", and adding that "if we support these message bills that don't really give women much help, then the real message we send is that we're not strongly committed to women".

Some commentators have criticized FFL for not promoting contraception. Katha Pollitt says that she asked Serrin Foster about it, and that Foster replied in part that the Pill did not work for teenagers, which Pollitt said was a belief she knew to be false. Feminist scholar Laury Oaks pointed out that FFL's silence on the subjects of contraception and safer sex "fails to address some of the most critical sexual and reproductive issues for women and presents views on pregnancy that cannot encompass the reality of many women's experiences".

== See also ==
- Feminism
- Silent No More
- Secular Pro-Life
