= Rachel MacNair =

American sociologist and anti-abortion activist (born 1958)

- Born: November 4, 1958 (age 67)
- Education: Doctorate
- Alma mater: Earlham College (BA); University of Missouri–Kansas City (PhD)
- Occupations: Activist, sociologist, psychologist, author, editor
- Website: www.RachelMacNair.com

Rachel M. MacNair (born November 4, 1958) is an American sociologist and psychologist who adheres to the consistent life ethic. She is an activist against abortion and war, and has written against the culture of violence and the eating of meat. An expert on veteran psychology, she coined the term "Perpetration-Induced Traumatic Stress" (PITS), a form of posttraumatic stress disorder (PTSD) that may result from the action of killing. She edited Working for Peace: A Handbook of Practical Psychology. She is also a Quaker, which influences her anti-violence work.

MacNair served for ten years as the president of Feminists for Life, an anti-abortion organization, and she founded the Susan B. Anthony List (now known as Susan B. Anthony Pro-Life America) to help elect anti-abortion politicians. She is a director of the Institute for Integrated Social Analysis, the research arm of the Consistent Life Network.

== Education ==
MacNair was the valedictorian for her class at Paseo High School in Kansas City, Missouri. In the 1970s, MacNair was active in the anti-nuclear movement. In June 1978 she earned a bachelor of arts degree in Peace and Conflict Studies from Earlham College in Richmond, Indiana, graduating with honors.

After a career in political activism, she entered a doctoral degree program at the University of Missouri–Kansas City in 1996. During her studies she was awarded an Arthur Mag Graduate Fellowship for outstanding scholarship, and a Chancellor's Special Merit Award in 1997, and a Chancellor's Interdisciplinary Fellowship in 1998. She earned a doctorate degree in Sociology and Psychology in December 1999, writing her dissertation: Symptom pattern differences for Perpetration-Induced Traumatic Stress in veterans: Probing the National Vietnam Veterans Readjustment Study.

== Anti-abortion ==
In 1979, MacNair joined Prolifers for Survival, a group formed by Juli Loesch to merge anti-abortion and anti-nuclear activism into a consistent life ethic. In 1987, the Prolifers for Survival changed into the Seamless Garment Network, and later still became known as Consistent Life.

=== Feminists for Life ===
In June 1984, while she was pregnant with her only child, MacNair began serving as president of Feminists for Life of America (FFL). She participated in more than 100 radio interviews and appeared as a speaker in front of college audiences. She told a reporter, "Abortion is the result of male domination. The main problem has always been that men set the terms for sex. Women need to have the power to set those terms. Abortion just sweeps that problem under the rug. It allows men to continue to be virtually free of responsibility for the results of their sexual activity." MacNair worked mostly alone in her position, operating FFL out of an office inside a crisis pregnancy center on East 47th Street in Kansas City. After ten years as leader, she stepped down in June 1994.

=== Susan B. Anthony Pro-Life America ===
The formation of the Susan B. Anthony List was catalyzed in March 1992 when MacNair watched a 60 Minutes television documentary profiling IBM-heiress Ellen Malcolm and the successful campaign-funding activities of her pro-Democratic Party, abortion rights group EMILY's List. MacNair wished to counter EMILY's List by providing early campaign funds to anti-abortion women candidates. Led by FFL and MacNair, 15 anti-abortion groups formed an umbrella organization, the National Women's Coalition for Life (NWCL), which adopted a joint anti-abortion statement on April 3, 1992.

Also inspired by EMILY's List, in 1992 the WISH List was formed to promote candidates who support abortion rights and were members of the opposing Republican Party. In November 1992 after many favored candidates won their races to create the "Year of the Woman", MacNair announced the formation of the SBA List, describing its purpose as endorsing and supporting women candidates who held anti-abortion beliefs, without regard to party affiliation. MacNair determined to challenge the EMILY's List and the WISH List notion that the top female politicians primarily supported abortion rights. She named Kansas governor Joan Finney and Louisiana Representative Lindy Boggs as examples of ideal politicians—liberal women, not candidates holding right-wing beliefs. The NWCL sponsored the SBA List with $2,485 to create it as a political action committee (PAC). The PAC paperwork was initiated on February 4, 1993, listing MacNair as the first secretary; the group operated out of MacNair's office in Kansas City.

MacNair founded the group with two other Feminists for Life leaders, Helen Alvaré and Susan Gibbs. After three years, MacNair, Gibbs, and Alvaré moved on to other projects. They were succeeded by experienced political activists Marjorie Dannenfelser and then Jane Abraham, changing the aim of the group away from bipartisan candidates. According to MacNair, "basically what happened is that Republicans took over". The SBA List now endorses male candidates, including anti-abortion men who are running against women who support abortion rights, and also Republican anti-abortion candidates of either sex running against Democratic anti-abortion candidates. Regarding the change of focus, MacNair said, "I was furious... but at that point there was nothing I could do about it."

== Psychology of killing ==
MacNair's doctoral research was on the psychology of killing. She studied soldiers, torturers, executioners, policemen, abortion providers, veterinarians, bullfighters and Nazi records. She pored over the National Vietnam Veterans Readjustment Study, analyzed the nearly 1700 questionnaires in a new manner, and found that soldiers who reported having killed someone were more likely to suffer psychological harm. She coined the term "perpetration-induced traumatic stress" (PITS), a form of post-traumatic stress disorder (PTSD) that may affect those such as soldiers, police and doctors who participate in killing. Thomas L. Murtaugh, Ph.D., the Project Officer, National Center for PTSD, said that MacNair's research was "groundbreaking". In August 2000, MacNair joined PTSD therapist William Chamberlain and Lieutenant Colonel Dave Grossman (the author of On Killing: The Psychological Cost of Learning to Kill in War and Society) in a panel discussion about PTSD at a convention of the American Psychiatric Association. In 2002 she published a book: Perpetration-Induced Traumatic Stress: The Psychological Consequences of Killing.

In July 2004, The New Yorker quoted MacNair regarding PITS; following this, the Los Angeles Times cited her as an expert on veteran psychology. In October 2004, director David O. Russell shot footage of MacNair speaking about PTSD and PITS for his documentary Soldiers Pay. Co-director Juan Carlos Zaldívar said, "She made really interesting contributions that we think are valid and should be part of the conversation of PTSD today."

== Vegetarianism ==
MacNair is against the killing of animals for food. She became a vegetarian at age 16. She has written about the ethics of eating meat and about the practices of vegetarianism and veganism and has spoken on this topic at several conferences, including the annual NAVS Vegetarian Summerfest.

== Personal life ==
At age 14 MacNair became a member of the Religious Society of Friends, and is currently a member of the Penn Valley Meeting in Kansas City. In the 1970s and 1980s, MacNair was arrested seven times for protesting nuclear weapons, five times for protesting nuclear power plants, and five times for protesting abortion clinics. She is the mother of a son conceived in 1984 by anonymous artificial insemination. She lives in her childhood home in Kansas City, Missouri.

== See also ==
- Pro-life feminism
