= Marjorie Dannenfelser =

President of Susan B. Anthony Pro-Life America

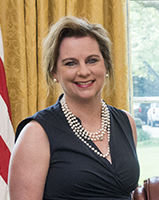
- Jones in April 2017
- Born: Marjorie Jones; 1965 or 1966 (age 60–61); Greenville, North Carolina, U.S.
- Education: Duke University (BA)
- Occupation: President of Susan B. Anthony Pro-Life America
- Political party: Republican

Marjorie Jones Dannenfelser is an American political activist who is the president of Susan B. Anthony Pro-Life America, an American political organization that seeks to advance anti-abortion women in politics. She was brought into the organization as its executive director in 1993, shortly after its founding by Rachel MacNair.

== Activism ==
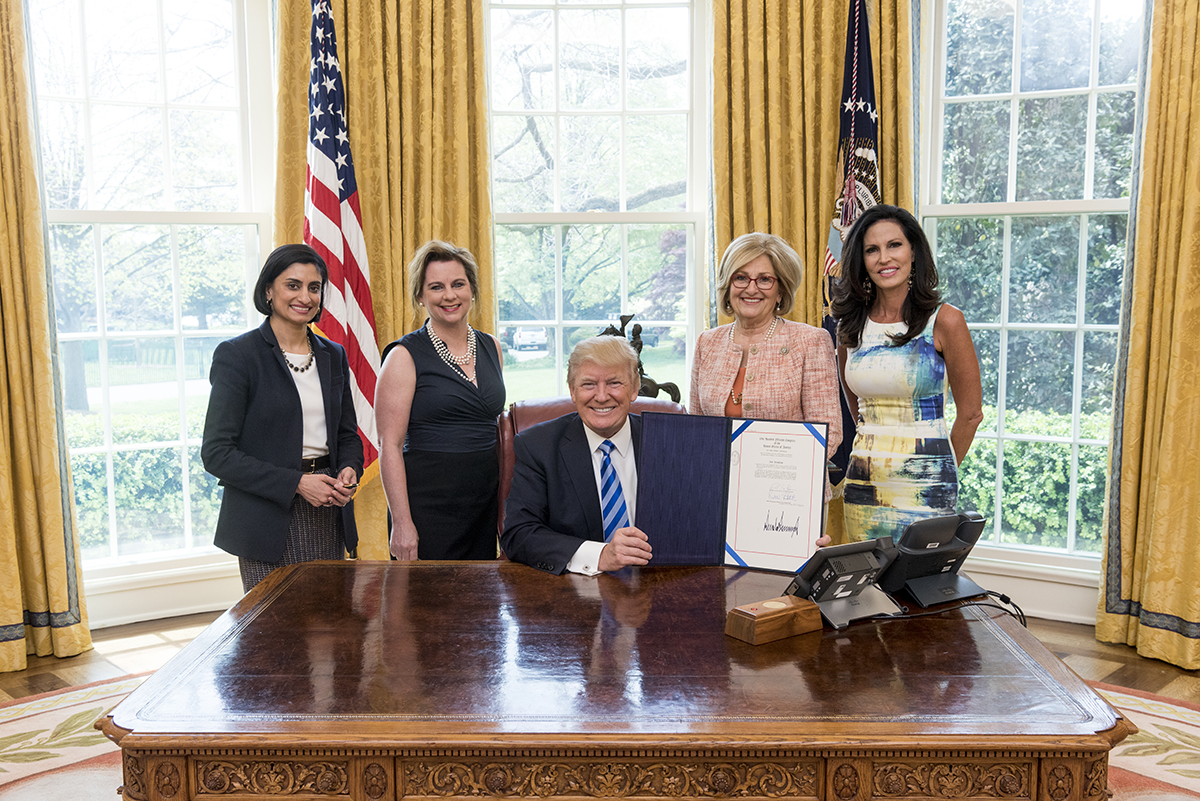
Seema Verma, Dannenfelser, Donald Trump, Diane Black, and Penny Nance in the Oval Office, April 2017

Pro-abortion rights as a college student, Marjorie Jones was the "pro-choice chair" of the Duke University College Republicans. But a summer spent in a Georgetown house for interns at The Heritage Foundation changed that, when "group-house drama" erupted over what Dannenfelser called an "inappropriate video". According to a 2010 Washington Post profile, 'a bitter schism erupted between social conservatives and libertarians over a pornographic video', which led to her conversion to Catholicism and a new anti-abortion stance. After graduating Duke, Dannenfelser worked for the Reagan administration.

In the 1990s, Dannenfelser was the staff director of the Congressional Pro-Life Caucus, and worked for U.S. House Representative Alan Mollohan (D-WV), whom the SBA List later worked to defeat in the 2010 Democratic primary. Mollohan was defeated in the primary by Mike Oliverio.

Dannenfelser re-organized the Susan B. Anthony List in 1997, after SBA List founder Rachel MacNair brought her on board as the first experienced political activist to join the group. Soon afterwards, Dannenfelser was joined by Jane Abraham to turn the SBA List away from MacNair's bi-partisan and liberal credo, moving to a Republican Party and conservative-oriented group. Dannenfelser and Abrahama led SBA List until 2006, when Dannenfelser assumed both the chairman and president positions. The organization, headquartered in Washington, D. C., lobbies law-makers, and spends millions of dollars per year supporting candidates.

Dannenfelser endorsed the unsuccessful John McCain 2008 presidential campaign. She supported McCain's running mate Sarah Palin, an anti-abortion politician, noting that McCain alone did not engage the "disaffected" pro-life voter bloc. Dannenfelser called Palin the "poster child" for the anti-abortion cause, though she later said Palin became a "great disappointment". In September 2016, Dannenfelser became Donald Trump's campaign "Pro-Life Coalition" leader.

== Personal life ==
Marjorie Jones was born, and raised, in Greenville, North Carolina. She grew up as an Episcopalian, and attended Duke University. She married Martin Dannenfelser, who later served as vice president of the evangelical political activist group Family Research Council. They had both worked as congressional aides in 1990. The two live in Arlington County, Virginia, where they raised five children.

== See also ==
- Anti-abortion feminism
