= Ann D. Gordon =

American historian (1949–2025)

Ann Dexter Gordon
- Born: 1944; Providence, Rhode Island, U.S.
- Died: March 19, 2025 (aged 80–81)
- Education: Smith College; University of Wisconsin–Madison
- Occupations: Historian, author, editor
- Employer: Rutgers University
- Known for: Selected Papers of Elizabeth Cady Stanton and Susan B. Anthony

Ann Dexter Gordon (1944 – March 19, 2025) was an American research professor in the department of history at Rutgers University and editor of the papers of Elizabeth Cady Stanton and Susan B. Anthony, a survey of more than 14,000 papers relating to the pair of 19th century women's rights activists. She was also the editor of the multi-volume work, Selected Papers of Elizabeth Cady Stanton and Susan B. Anthony, and has authored a number of other books about the history of the women's suffrage movement. She worked with popular historian Ken Burns on his 1999 book and appears in his documentary film about Stanton and Anthony. From 2006, Gordon repeatedly weighed in on the Susan B. Anthony abortion dispute stating that "Anthony spent no time on the politics of abortion. It was of no interest to her."

== Biography ==
=== Early career ===
Gordon was born in Providence, Rhode Island in 1944. She received a Bachelor of Arts degree at Smith College in Massachusetts, then went to the University of Wisconsin–Madison for post graduate work. While there, the editors of The New York Review of Books published a letter she wrote in May 1967 as a sharp response to a Paul Goodman piece sympathetic to draft-card burning by isolated individuals. She earned a Master of Arts degree and a doctorate in American history, writing in 1975 a doctoral dissertation entitled The College of Philadelphia, 1749–1779: Impact of an Institution.

Between 1975 and 1982, Gordon worked on the editorial staffs of two projects, one publishing the papers of Jane Addams, the first American woman Nobel Peace Prize winner, and the other the papers of President Woodrow Wilson.

=== The Elizabeth Cady Stanton & Susan B. Anthony Papers Project ===
In 1982, Gordon joined the Elizabeth Cady Stanton and Susan B. Anthony Papers project which was then forming at Rutgers, and helped the project produce a microfilm volume in 1991 of 14,000 relevant historical documents cataloged and described, composed equally of published texts and of manuscripts. Since then, more texts have been received and cataloged. Led by Gordon as editor, the project determined to produce six volumes of The Selected Papers of Elizabeth Cady Stanton and Susan B. Anthony, to "record the first half century of women's campaign for political rights in the US and provide the primary reference point for examining women's political history in the nineteenth century." All six have now been published:

- In the School of Anti-Slavery, 1840–1866. (1997) ISBN 0-8135-2317-6
- Against an Aristocracy of Sex, 1866 to 1873. (2000) ISBN 0-8135-2318-4
- National Protection for National Citizens, 1873 to 1880. (2003) ISBN 0-8135-2319-2
- When Clowns Make Laws for Queens, 1880 to 1887. (2006) ISBN 0-8135-2320-6
- Their Place Inside the Body-Politic, 1887 to 1895. (2009) ISBN 978-0-8135-2321-7
- An Awful Hush, 1895 to 1906. (2013) ISBN 978-08135-5345-0

Screenwriter Geoffrey Ward helped bring Gordon's work into the 1999 documentary film, Not for Ourselves Alone: The Story of Elizabeth Cady Stanton & Susan B. Anthony, directed and produced by Ken Burns. Gordon appears in the film and assisted Burns and Ward in writing an accompanying book, which includes a section by Gordon titled, "Taking Possession of the Country".

=== Other writings ===
In 1971, Gordon joined with Mari Jo Buhle and Nancy E. Schrom to author "Women in American Society: An Historical Contribution", an article that appeared in the journal Radical America. The article was "conceived as a response to the conceptual problems confronted by all who seek to comprehend the historically rooted sources of today's oppression" of women in America.

With Bettye Collier-Thomas, professor of history and the Director of the Temple University Center for African-American History and Culture, Gordon edited African American women and the vote, 1837–1965, a book describing major turning points for women in African-American history. Gordon wrote in the introduction that the 1997 book originated as papers submitted in 1987 at the University of Massachusetts for the conference "Afro-American Women and the Vote: From Abolitionism to the Voting Rights Act". Gordon noted that the milestones set down in the book differ significantly from similar ones marking the history of white American women, including 1837 in New York City as the first time African-American women formally "define[d] their roles independent of men", predating the 1848 Seneca Falls Convention as the touchstone used by Stanton and Anthony to mark the start of the American woman suffrage movement.

In 2000, Gordon reviewed Spectacular Confessions: Autobiography, Performative Activism, and the Sites of Suffrage, 1905–1938, a book by Barbara Green about British suffragists, the review published in Biography journal.

Gordon wrote two electronic books, published online: The Trial of Susan B. Anthony and Travels for Reform: The Early Work of Susan B. Anthony and Elizabeth Cady Stanton, 1852–1861. The 2005 work The Trial of Susan B. Anthony was completed in collaboration with the Federal Judicial Center, as a training aid for students of legal history. The book discusses Anthony's trial and felony conviction in 1873 for her 1872 vote cast illegally in that year's presidential and congressional elections. Earlier in 1999, Gordon worked with Ann Pfau, Tamara Gaskell Miller, and Kimberly J. Banks to edit Travels for Reform: The Early Work of Susan B. Anthony and Elizabeth Cady Stanton, 1852–1861, a book about the first decade of Anthony's partnership with Stanton and their travels around New York State to promote women's rights causes, primarily women's right to vote. The book was prepared with Model Editions Partnership, University of South Carolina, from microfilm documents, images of original documents, and portions of Volume I of Selected Papers.

=== Anthony and abortion ===
From 2006, Gordon wrote and spoke out against pro-life organizations such as Feminists for Life (FFL) and Susan B. Anthony List (SBA List) that maintain that 'Anthony was an outspoken opponent of abortion'. Gordon held that Anthony "never voiced an opinion about the sanctity of fetal life" and that "she never voiced an opinion about using the power of the state to require that pregnancies be brought to term." In October 2006, Gordon stated that she was beginning to see college students who only knew Anthony as an activist opposed to abortion, a view she said was "based more on fiction than fact". Gordon stated that "comparing the debate over abortion today with the debate that was taking place in the 19th century is misleading." For the North Adams Transcript in February 2010, Gordon said "I've watched the anti-abortion movement make these assertions since 1989. It's pretty far fetched". In a May 2010 opinion piece in The Washington Post's "On Faith" blog, co-authored with Lynn Sherr, Gordon noted that Anthony's statements on abortion are limited to a single, ambiguous diary entry, and concluded that, "Anthony spent no time on the politics of abortion. It was of no interest to her, despite living in a society (and a family) where women aborted unwanted pregnancies."

=== Death ===
Gordon died on March 19, 2025.
