= Juli Loesch =

American anti-abortion activist

Juli Loesch (born 1951), also known as Julianne Wiley, Julie Loesch Wiley, and Juli Loesch Wiley, is an American anti-abortion activist, Catholic feminist, and former media coordinator for Operation Rescue in Atlanta, Georgia.

Born in Erie, Pennsylvania, Loesch attended Antioch College, where, as an anti-war advocate, she pursued an education in non-violent social change. Within 3 months, she was in Delano, California, working for Cesar Chavez of the United Farm Workers (UFW). She helped organize grape and lettuce boycotts in Detroit and Cleveland in support of Chavez's strikes in California. In 1972, Loesch became one of the founding members of the Pax (Peace) Center in Erie, Pennsylvania, joining Sr. Mary Lou Kownacki, OSB, in forming a Catholic feminist peace community. This group, comprising Benedictine Sisters and lay associates, was essentially organized according to the Catholic Worker model, combining activism with the Works of Mercy (soup kitchen, homeless shelter work, etc.). The Pax Center, together with other Catholic antiwar activist groups, soon morphed into Pax Christi USA, the American affiliate of Pax Christi, an international Catholic peace movement.

In the late 1970s, Loesch became an activist associated with the "Mobilization for Survival", a coalition that opposed nuclear weapons. She became convinced that abortion and the nuclear arms race were moral equivalents, and advocated partnership between the peace and anti-abortion movements. In 1979, she founded the "bridge" organization Prolifers for Survival, which operated until 1987. She has written extensively on these and related subjects. The larger Consistent Life Ethic movement grew partly out of her writing and activism. Her articles or essays have appeared in the New Oxford Review, the National Catholic Reporter, the National Catholic Register, Consistent Life, Commonweal, Sojourners, Caelum et Terra, and Touchstone. Loesch is married to Donald Wiley, with whom she has two sons, and is a contributing editor for Voices, a publication of Women for Faith and Family.
