= Anti-abortion feminism =

Belief that abortion harms women

Anti-abortion feminism is the opposition to abortion by some feminists. Anti-abortion feminists may believe that the principles behind women's rights also call them to oppose abortion on right to life grounds and that abortion hurts women more than it benefits them.

The modern anti-abortion feminist movement cites precedent in the 19th century; the movement itself began to take shape in the early to mid-1970s with the founding of Feminists for Life (FFL) in the United States and Women for Life in Great Britain amid legal changes in those nations which widely permitted abortion. FFL and the Susan B. Anthony List (SBA List) are the most prominent anti-abortion feminist organizations in the United States. Other anti-abortion feminist organizations include New Wave Feminists and Feminists for Nonviolent Choices.

== Views and goals ==
Anti-abortion feminists consider the legal option of abortion to "support anti-motherhood social attitudes and policies and limit respect for women's citizenship". Anti-abortion feminists believe that abortion is an action dictated by society and legal abortion "perpetuates an uncaring, male-dominated society." Laury Oaks, Associate Professor of Feminist Studies at the University of California, Santa Barbara, writes that when abortion is legal, anti-abortion feminists believe that "women come to see pregnancy and parenting as obstacles to full participation in education and the workplace", and describes anti-abortion feminist activism in Ireland as more "pro-mother" than "pro-woman". Oaks has written that while Irish abortion opponents valorize child-bearing and are critical of the notion that women have "a right to an identity beyond motherhood", some like Breda O'Brien, founder of Feminists for Life Ireland, also offer feminist-inspired arguments that women's contributions to society are not limited to such functions.

Anti-abortion feminist organizations generally do not distinguish between views on abortion as a legal issue, abortion as a moral issue, and abortion as a medical procedure. Such distinctions are made by many women, for example women who would not abort their own pregnancies but would prefer that abortion remain legal. Anti-abortion feminist organizations seek to personalize abortion by using women who survived abortions to attempt to convince others of their argument. Prominent American anti-abortion feminist organizations seek to end abortion in the United States. The SBA List states this as their "ultimate goal", and FFL president Serrin Foster said that FFL "opposes abortion in all cases because violence is a violation of basic feminist principles."

== Relationship to other movements ==
Anti-abortion feminists form a part of the anti-abortion movements rather than the mainstream feminist movement. During the era of second wave feminism in the late 1960s and 1970s, the tenets of the emerging group of anti-abortion feminists were rejected by mainstream feminists who held that for full participation in society, a woman's "moral and legal right to control her fertility" needed to be a fundamental principle. From their minority position, anti-abortion feminists said that mainstream feminists did not speak for all women.

Having failed to gain a respected position within mainstream feminism, anti-abortion feminists aligned themselves with other anti-abortion and right to life groups. According to Oaks, this placement has eroded a feminist sense of identity separate from other anti-abortion groups, despite pro-woman arguments that are distinct from the fetal rights arguments put forward by other anti-abortion advocates.

== Arguments ==
The abortion debate has primarily been focused on the question of whether or not the human fetus is a person and whether or not the killing of humans (depending on their developmental stage) should ever fall under the umbrella of person autonomy. Anti-abortion feminist organizations distinguish themselves as "pro-woman" organizations as opposed to "fetal rights" organizations. This sets them apart from other anti-abortion groups.

The "pro-woman" argument frames abortion as harmful to women. Anti-abortion feminists argue that most women do not truly want to have abortions, but rather are forced into abortions by third parties, partners or medical practitioners. They also suggest that women have been primed and socialized to believe they cannot be successful if they experience an unanticipated pregnancy and that our society continues to reflect patriarchal standards that use men as the "basic human". They believe unwanted abortions, can cause physical and emotional damage to women. Research from the Guttmacher Institute shows that the majority of women who have abortions seek the procedure for personal, financial, vocational, or family planning purposes rather than under coercion from third-parties. By positing the existence of a post-abortion syndrome mental condition, which is not medically recognized, anti-abortion feminists reframe opposition to abortion in terms of protecting women's public health. The "pro-woman" argument has been used to sway men and women against-abortion.

== 19th-century feminists ==
Feminist anti-abortion groups say they are continuing the tradition of 19th-century women's rights activists such as Elizabeth Cady Stanton, Matilda Joslyn Gage, Victoria Woodhull, Elizabeth Blackwell, and Alice Paul, who considered abortion to be an evil forced upon women by men. The Revolution, a newspaper published by Susan B. Anthony and Stanton, carried letters, essays, and editorials debating many issues of the day, including articles decrying "child murder" and "infanticide". According to historians A. Kennedy and K. D. Mary, Alice Paul felt that abortion was the "ultimate exploitation of women", and was worried about female babies being aborted. Kennedy and Mary also say that Elizabeth Blackwell, the first female doctor in the United States, became a doctor because of her passionate hatred for abortion. By way of criticism, sociologists Nicole Beisel and Tamara Kay have written that White Anglo-Saxon Protestants (WASPs) in the United States were worried that continued abortions by their kind would endanger their position at the top of society's hierarchy, especially fearing the influx of Irish Catholics, but also concerned about African Americans, and describe Anthony and Stanton as part of this reactionary racial stance. In arguing for "voluntary motherhood", or abstinence until children are wanted, Stanton said that the problem of abortion demonstrates the victimization of women by men who pass laws without women's consent. Woodhull and her sister, Tennessee Celeste Claflin, argued that abortion clinics would go out of business if voluntary motherhood was widely practiced.

A dispute about Anthony's abortion views arose in 1989. Anti-abortion feminists in the United States began using Anthony's words and image to promote their anti-abortion cause. Scholars of 19th-century American feminism, as well as abortion-rights activists, countered what they considered a co-opting of Anthony's legacy as the country's most dedicated suffragist, saying that the anti-abortion activists are falsely attributing opinions to Anthony, and that it is misleading to apply 19th-century arguments to the modern abortion debate.

== See also ==
- Dorothy Day
- Pro-choice and pro-life
- Right to life § Abortion debate framing
- Susan B. Anthony abortion dispute
- United States anti-abortion movement
