= Secular Pro-Life =

American secular anti-abortion organization

- Abbreviation: SPL
- Formation: 2009
- President: Kelsey Hazzard
- Executive Director: Monica Snyder
- Website: secularprolife.org

Secular Pro-Life (SPL) is an American secular anti-abortion organization. SPL argues against abortion and conducts advocacy, including on university campuses.

== History ==
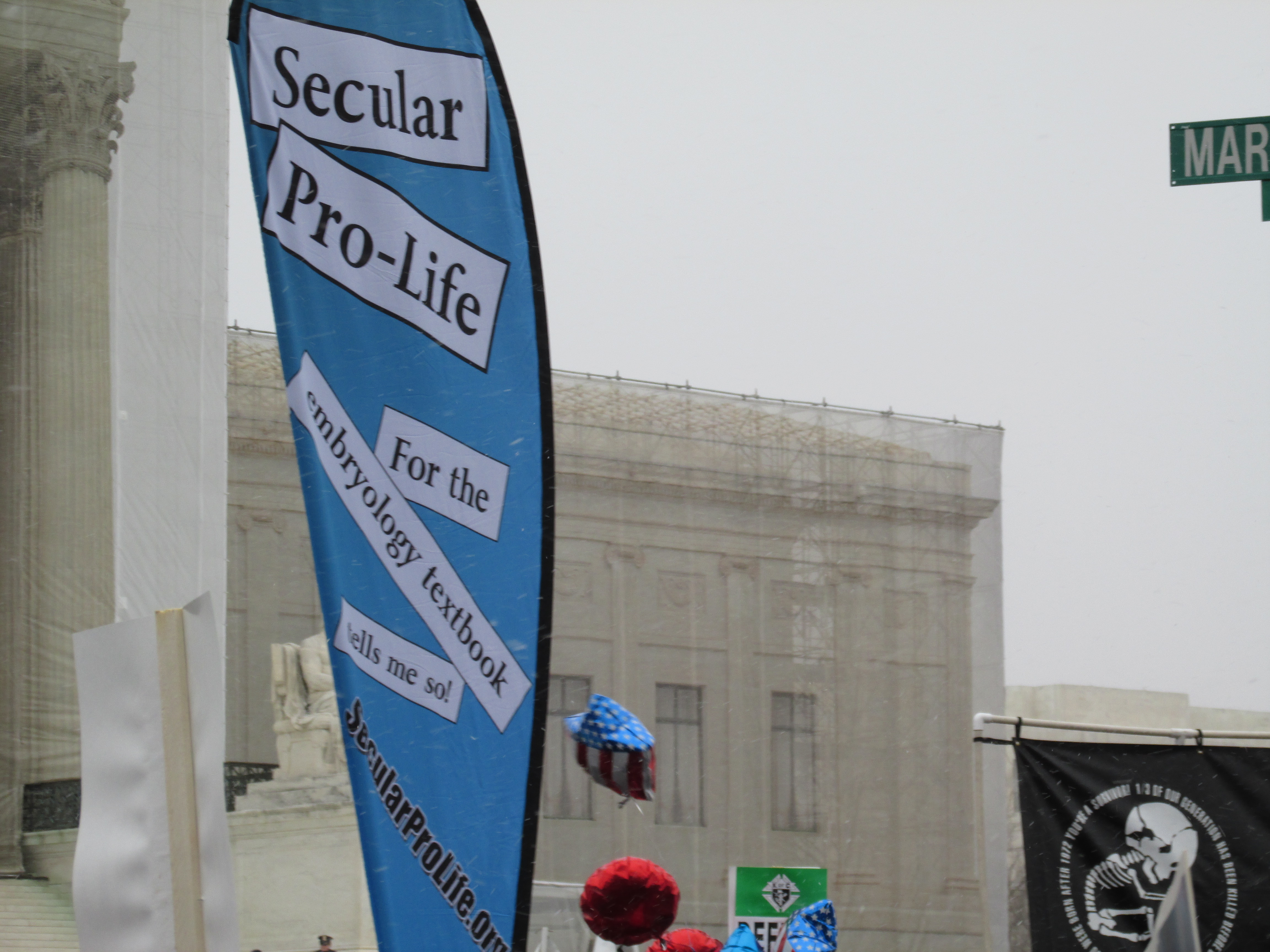
A Secular Pro-Life banner at the March for Life in Washington, D.C. in 2013

Secular Pro-Life was founded in 2009 by Kelsey Hazzard, who serves as the Board President. Hazzard identifies as an atheist, and attended law school at the University of Virginia in Charlottesville, Virginia. In 2021, Secular Pro-Life announced its first Executive Director, Monica Snyder. Snyder, who also identifies as an atheist, studied chemical biology at University of California, Berkeley and forensic science at University of California, Davis.

Secular Pro-Life ran a stall at the 2012 American Atheists conference. Their presence there caused some controversy within the atheist community.

In February 2014, Hazzard gave a talk at the University of Georgia titled "Pro-Life Without God".

In March 2024, Executive Director Monica Snyder gave a presentation at the University of Portland entitled "Deconstructing Three Pro-Choice Myths."
