= Elizabeth Cady Stanton and Susan B. Anthony Papers =

Collection

The Elizabeth Cady Stanton and Susan B. Anthony Papers project was an academic undertaking to collect and document all available materials written by Elizabeth Cady Stanton and Susan B. Anthony, two early leaders of the women's rights movement. The project began in 1982. In 1991, after nine years of research, the project published the materials it had collected as a 45-reel microfilm edition under the editorship of Patricia G. Holland and Ann D. Gordon. It included 14,000 documents gathered from 202 libraries and government offices, 671 different newspapers and other periodicals, and three dozen private collections. The microfilm edition more than doubled the sources that previously had been available.

In 1992 the project moved to Rutgers University to begin the work of producing The Selected Papers of Elizabeth Cady Stanton and Susan B. Anthony, which was published in six volumes. Gordon, the project director, completed the work with the help other professional historians and also graduate assistants and students. With Gordon as editor, the first volume was published in 1997 and the last in 2013. The project was inactivated after the last volume was published.

== Publications ==
- Gordon, Ann D., ed. (1997). The Selected Papers of Elizabeth Cady Stanton and Susan B. Anthony: In the School of Anti-Slavery, 1840 to 1866. Vol. 1 of 6. New Brunswick, NJ: Rutgers University Press. ISBN 0-8135-2317-6.
- Gordon, Ann D., ed. (2000). The Selected Papers of Elizabeth Cady Stanton and Susan B. Anthony: Against an aristocracy of sex, 1866 to 1873. Vol. 2 of 6. New Brunswick, NJ: Rutgers University Press. ISBN 0-8135-2318-4.
- Gordon, Ann D., ed. (2003). The Selected Papers of Elizabeth Cady Stanton and Susan B. Anthony: National protection for national citizens, 1873 to 1880. Vol. 3 of 6. New Brunswick, NJ: Rutgers University Press. ISBN 0-8135-2319-2.
- Gordon, Ann D., ed. (2006). The Selected Papers of Elizabeth Cady Stanton and Susan B. Anthony: When clowns make laws for queens, 1880–1887. Vol. 4 of 6. New Brunswick, NJ: Rutgers University Press. ISBN 0-8135-2320-6.
- Gordon, Ann D., ed. (2009). The Selected Papers of Elizabeth Cady Stanton and Susan B. Anthony: Place Inside the Body-Politic, 1887 to 1895. Vol. 5 of 6. New Brunswick, NJ: Rutgers University Press. ISBN 978-0-8135-2321-7.
- Gordon, Ann D., ed. (2013). The Selected Papers of Elizabeth Cady Stanton and Susan B. Anthony: An Awful Hush, 1895 to 1906. Vol. 6 of 6. New Brunswick, NJ: Rutgers University Press. ISBN 0-8135-2320-6.
