= Susan B. Anthony Pro-Life America =

US anti-abortion organization

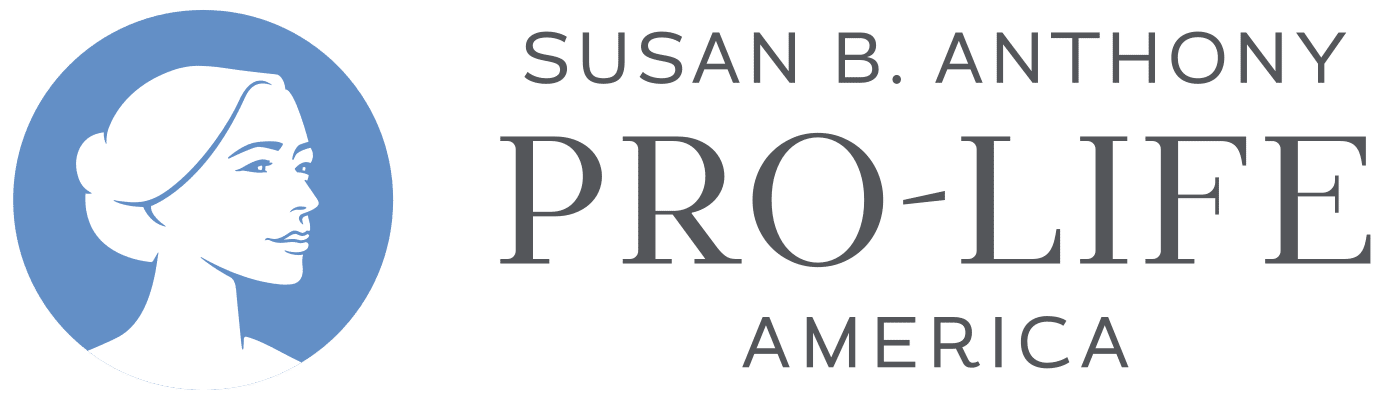
- Founded: February 4, 1993; Re-organized 1997
- Founder: Rachel MacNair
- Type: 501(c)(4) non-profit
- Purpose: anti-abortion political advocacy
- Location: Washington, D.C., U.S.
- Region served: United States
- Key people: Marjorie Dannenfelser (President); Emily Buchanan (Executive Director); Ingrid Skop (Director of Medical Affairs)
- Website: sbaprolife.org

Susan B. Anthony Pro-Life America (formerly Susan B. Anthony List) is an American 501(c)(4) non-profit organization, which seeks to reduce and ultimately end abortion in the US, by supporting anti-abortion politicians, primarily women, through its SBA Pro-Life America Candidate Fund political action committee.

Founded in 1993 by sociologist and psychologist Rachel MacNair, the SBA List was a response to the success of the abortion rights group EMILY's List, which was partly responsible for bringing about the 1992 "Year of the Woman", in which a significant number of women who favored abortion rights were elected to Congress. MacNair wished to help anti-abortion women gain high public office.

MacNair recruited Marjorie Dannenfelser and Jane Abraham as the first experienced leaders of SBA List. Dannenfelser is now president of the organization and Abraham is chairwoman of the board. Named for suffragist Susan B. Anthony, SBA List identifies itself with Anthony and several 19th-century women's rights activists. SBA List argues that Anthony and other early feminists were opposed to abortion, a view that has been challenged by scholars and abortion-rights activists. Anthony scholar Ann D. Gordon and Anthony biographer Lynn Sherr write that Anthony "spent no time on the politics of abortion".

== Founding ==
The formation of the SBA List was catalyzed in March 1992 when Rachel MacNair, head of Feminists for Life, watched a 60 Minutes television documentary profiling IBM heiress Ellen Malcolm and the successful campaign-funding activities of her Democratic abortion-rights group EMILY's List. MacNair, a peace activist and anti-abortion activist, was motivated to organize the Susan B. Anthony List for the purpose of countering EMILY's List by providing early campaign funds to anti-abortion women candidates. Led by FFL and MacNair, 15 anti-abortion groups formed an umbrella organization, the National Women's Coalition for Life (NWCL), which adopted a joint anti-abortion statement on April 3, 1992.

Also inspired by EMILY's List, in 1992, the WISH List was formed to promote Republican candidates who favored abortion rights. In November 1992, after many of the candidates who favored abortion rights won their races to create what was termed the "Year of the Woman", MacNair announced the formation of the SBA List, describing its purpose as endorsing and supporting women who held anti-abortion beliefs without regard to party affiliation. MacNair determined to challenge the EMILY's List and the WISH List notion that the top female politicians primarily supported abortion rights. She said the SBA List would not support right-wing political candidates. "We want good records on women's rights – probably not Phyllis Schlafly". The NWCL sponsored the SBA List with $2,485 to create it as a political action committee (PAC) on February 4, 1993, listing MacNair as the first secretary; the group operated out of MacNair's office inside a crisis pregnancy center on East 47th Street in Kansas City, Missouri. The first SBA List public event was held the same month at the Washington, D.C., headquarters of the National Woman's Party. Organized by founding board member Susan Gibbs, the "kickoff" event raised "more than $9000".

=== Susan B. Anthony and early feminist connection ===
MacNair named the SBA List after the famous suffragist. The leaders of the SBA List say that Anthony was "passionately pro-life". The portrayal of Anthony as a passionate opponent of abortion has been subject to a modern-day dispute. The National Susan B. Anthony Museum and House said, "The List's assertions about Susan B. Anthony's position on abortion are historically inaccurate." Anthony scholar Ann D. Gordon and Anthony biographer Lynn Sherr said that "Anthony spent no time on the politics of abortion. It was of no interest to her." According to Marjorie Dannenfelser, president of the SBA List, Anthony "referred to abortion as 'the horrible crime of child murder'". Gordon and Sherr said the "child-murder" quote attributed to Anthony actually appeared in an article written anonymously by someone else and that other quotes attributed to Anthony have been misattributed or taken out of context. Gordon said that Anthony "never voiced an opinion about the sanctity of fetal life ... and she never voiced an opinion about using the power of the state to require that pregnancies be brought to term". The Anthony Museum and House provided evidence for the idea that the author of the "child-murder" article was a man.

== History ==
=== Early activities and re-organization ===
Founding board member Susan Gibbs, later the communications director for the Roman Catholic Archdiocese of Washington, said, of the early years for the SBA List, "None of us had political experience. None of us had PAC experience. We just had a passion for being pro-life." Shortly after its founding, experienced political activists Marjorie Dannenfelser and then Jane Abraham were brought on board — Dannenfelser served as executive director, leading the organization from her home in Arlington, Virginia. In 1994, the SBA List was successful in helping 8 of its 15 selected candidates gain office. In 1996, only two challengers who were financially backed were elected, while five SBA-List-supported incumbents retained their positions, a disappointing election for the group.

In 1997, the SBA List was re-organized by Dannenfelser and Abraham into its current form as a 501(c)(4) non-profit organization with a connected PAC, the SBA List Candidate Fund. Abraham became president and Dannenfelser held the position of chairwoman of the board. The rules for endorsing and financially supporting candidates were tightened: in addition to the politician having to be female, she must have demonstrated an anti-abortion record (a simple declaration was not enough), and she must be seen as likely to win her race.

In 1998, the SBA List began backing male anti-abortion candidates as well, endorsing three men in a pilot program. One of the three won election to office: Republican Peter Fitzgerald who received $2,910 from the SBA List to assist him in his $12.3 million win over Democrat Carol Moseley Braun in a battle for the U.S. Senate seat in Illinois. Abraham served as president from 1997 until 2006 when Dannenfelser became president. In 2000, the SBA List contributed $25,995 to its favored candidates, in contrast to the WISH List and EMILY's List, which contributed $608,273 and $20 million, respectively, to their favored candidates.

=== 21st-century history ===
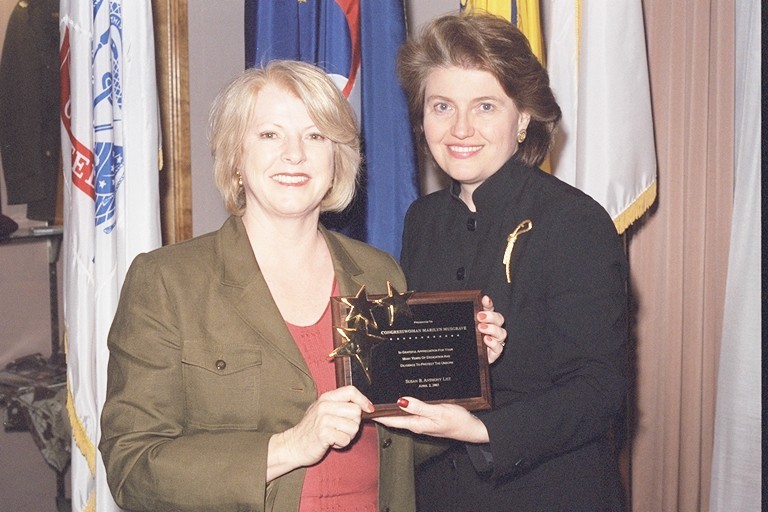
In April 2003, Representative Marilyn Musgrave (left) received an award from SBA List President Jane Abraham.

Contributions from supporters grew by 50% from 2007 to 2009. As of December 2009, the SBA List had outspent the National Organization for Women in every election cycle since 1996. Former Congresswoman Marilyn Musgrave joined the SBA List in March 2009 and works as a project director and spokesperson. The organization tried to keep abortion coverage out of any health care reform legislation in 2009 and 2010. It had targeted Senator Bob Casey to ensure abortion was not covered in the Patient Protection and Affordable Care Act (PPACA), and lobbied for the Stupak-Pitts Amendment to H.R. 3962. The group criticized Senator Ben Nelson for what it called a "fake compromise" on abortion in the PPACA and condemned the Christmas Eve passage of the Senate bill.

The group had planned to honor Rep. Bart Stupak (D-MI) at its March gala, but after Stupak's deal with President Obama, in which Obama would issue an executive order banning federal funding for abortion under the bill, Stupak was stripped of his "Defender of Life Award" three days before the gala because of the SBA List's doubts, shared by the most prominent anti-abortion groups, about the effectiveness of the Executive Order. Stupak had told Dannenfelser, "They [the Democratic leadership] know I won't fold. There is no way." On the day of the vote, Dannenfelser said she promised Stupak that the SBA List was "going to be involved in your defeat". In a statement, Dannenfelser said, "We were planning to honor Congressman Stupak for his efforts to keep abortion-funding out of health care reform. We will no longer be doing so...Let me be clear: any representative, including Rep. Stupak, who votes for this health care bill can no longer call themselves 'pro-life.'" No one received the award in his place, and Dannenfelser instead used the occasion to condemn Stupak. The group dropped its plans to help Stupak fend off a primary challenge from Connie Saltonstall, who decided to challenge Stupak on the basis of his anti-abortion views. Stupak later dropped out of the race, announcing his retirement from Congress.

In 2010, the SBA List hosted events featuring prominent anti-abortion political figures as speakers, including Sarah Palin, Minnesota Governor Tim Pawlenty and Rep. Michele Bachmann. In August 2010, to commemorate the 90th anniversary of the ratification of the 19th Amendment, which granted women the right to vote, the SBA List held a colloquium with five scholars at the Yale Club of New York City, billed as "A Conversation on Pro-Life Feminism". An SBA List project, "Votes Have Consequences", was headed by former Congresswoman Marilyn Musgrave and was aimed at defeating vulnerable candidates in 2010 whom they considered insufficiently anti-abortion, for instance those who supported health care reform. In January 2011, along with Americans for Tax Reform and The Daily Caller, the organization sponsored a debate between candidates for chair of the Republican National Committee.

Peter Roff writing for U.S. News & World Report credited the SBA List for the passage in the House of an amendment to defund Planned Parenthood of federal dollars for fiscal year 2011. Writing for In These Times, feminist author Jude Ellison Sady Doyle wrote that in striving against Planned Parenthood, the SBA List registered its priority as ending abortion rather than helping women prevent unwanted pregnancies. In March 2011, the SBA List teamed with Live Action for a bus tour through 13 congressional districts either thanking or condemning their representatives for their votes to defund Planned Parenthood of tax dollars in the Pence Amendment. In response, Planned Parenthood launched its own tour to follow the SBA List bus. The SBA List also bought $200,000 in radio and television ads backing six Republicans who voted to defund Planned Parenthood in response to a $200,000 ad buy by Planned Parenthood against the Pence Amendment.

In July 2011, the SBA List held a rally in New Hampshire supporting the New Hampshire Executive Council's decision to cut off state funding for Planned Parenthood. The SBA List has lobbied for passage of the Pain Capable Unborn Child Protection Act, a federal bill which would ban abortions after 20 weeks. Also in 2011, the SBA List founded the Charlotte Lozier Institute. Named after Charlotte Denman Lozier, the institute has served as the SBA List's research and education institute ever since. In May 2018, President Donald Trump addressed the SBA List's 11th Annual Campaign for Life Gala, becoming the first sitting president to address the group. In his address, Trump asked listeners to "vote for life". SBA is a member of the advisory board of Project 2025, a collection of conservative and right-wing policy proposals from The Heritage Foundation to reshape the United States federal government and consolidate executive power should the Republican nominee win the 2024 United States presidential election. SBA List is closely connected and funded by conservative legal activist Leonard Leo. In 2024, Leo's Virginia-based nonprofit, the Concord Fund, donated $8.8 million to SBA List. As of 2023, the Concord Fund had committed $15 million to pro-life campaigns and organizations.

== Strategies ==
The SBA List employs many strategies in order to attract the public to its mission. Lawyer and Scholar Tali Leinwand explains that the SBA List encourages Republicans not to endorse personhood amendments, and attempts to link the anti-abortion movement to less controversial causes like opposition to the Affordable Care Act. These strategies, Leinwand argues, attempt to de-stigmatize the anti-abortion movement.

=== Charlotte Lozier Institute ===
Founded in 2011, the Charlotte Lozier Institute (sometimes shortened to the Lozier Institute or CLI) is SBA List's research and education arm. Named after Charlotte Denman Lozier, it is based in Arlington, Virginia. Charles Donovan serves as its president, while James Studnicki is its director of data analytics.

In 2021, the group filed an amicus brief in Dobbs v. Jackson Women's Health Organization, a Supreme Court case over a 2018 Mississippi state law banning most abortions after 15 weeks. CLI argued that research has shown fetuses can feel pain as early as the second trimester of pregnancy, and states have legitimate interests in "preventing the infliction of great pain and even death on a conscious human being," and so the Mississippi law should be found constitutional. The Supreme Court ultimately ruled that the Constitution does not guarantee a right to abortion.

In 2023, research from CLI was cited in Judge Matthew J. Kacsmaryk's ruling in Alliance for Hippocratic Medicine v. FDA, a lawsuit challenging the Food and Drug Administration's approval of mifepristone, a drug used in medication abortions. The now-retracted study, authored by James Studnicki, claimed that more than one-fourth of women on Medicaid who were prescribed abortion medication between 1999 and 2015 went to an emergency room within 30 days. The study was retracted in 2024 based on several factors, including unsupported assumptions, misleading presentation of data, and lack of scientific rigor. In addition, the retraction cited undisclosed conflicts of interest, as one of the peer reviewers was affiliated with CLI and all but one of the authors had undeclared affiliations with CLI or other anti-abortion advocacy organizations. As part of the investigation, two other studies by Studnicki from 2021 and 2022 were also retracted over fundamental errors in study design, analysis, and data presentation, and an undisclosed conflict of interest from the same peer reviewer.

== Elections ==
=== 2006 elections ===
The 2006 midterm elections were moderately successful for the SBA list. Twenty-one out of 38 endorsed candidates won their contests, for a success rate of 55%

=== 2008 presidential election ===
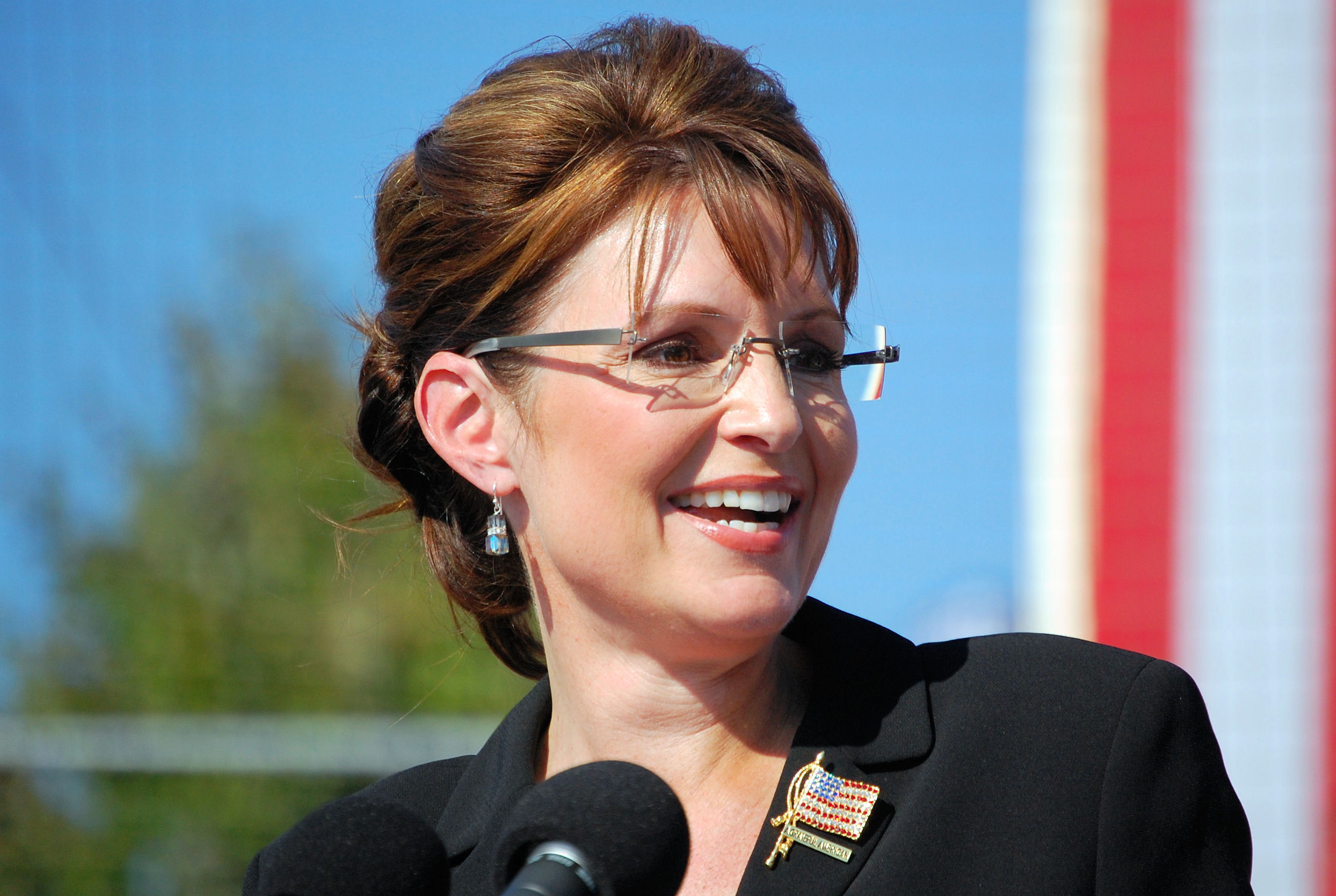
Sarah Palin on the campaign trail in 2008

The SBA List gained renewed attention during the 2008 United States presidential election following Sarah Palin's nomination for Vice President. In 2008, the SBA List also started a social networking service and blog called "Team Sarah", which is "dedicated to advancing the values that Sarah Palin represents in the political process". Palin headlined the organization's 2010 "Celebration of Life" breakfast fundraiser, an event which got extensive media coverage and in which she coined the term "mama grizzly". According to Politico, Palin's criteria for endorsing candidates is whether they have the support of the Tea Party movement and whether they have the support of the SBA List.

=== 2009 elections ===
In the 2009 special election to fill the vacant House seat for the New York's 23rd congressional district in upstate New York, the group endorsed Doug Hoffman, the candidate of the Conservative Party of New York, over the Republican candidate, Dede Scozzafava, who favors abortion rights. The SBA List spent over $100,000 on Hoffman's behalf, joining with the National Organization for Marriage and other socially conservative groups in supporting Hoffman's campaign.

=== 2010 elections ===
For the 2010 elections, the SBA List planned to spend $6 million, (including $3 million solely on U.S. Senate races, and endorsed several dozen candidates. The SBA List spent nearly $1.7 million on independent expenditure campaigns for or against 50 candidates. The SBA List conducted a 23-city bus tour to the Congressional districts of self-described "pro-life" Democrats in Ohio, Indiana and Pennsylvania who voted for the health care reform bill and to rally supporters to vote them out. The bus tour attracted counterprotests at some stops, such as one in Pennsylvania where a group called Catholics United accused the SBA List of lying about health care reform.

The organization launched a "Life Speaking Out" petition to urge the Republican Party to include opposition to abortion in its Pledge to America. The petition was sent with over 20,000 signatures on it. In the California Senate race, the group endorsed Carly Fiorina against incumbent Senator Barbara Boxer, and spent slightly under $235,000 in independent expenditures in support of Fiorina. The SBA List partnered with the National Organization for Marriage to air Spanish-language TV commercials attacking Boxer's positions on abortion and gay marriage. However, Boxer prevailed over Fiorina in the November 2010 election.

Other notable endorsements included Sharron Angle, who unsuccessfully challenged incumbent Senate Majority Leader Harry Reid in Nevada; the SBA List endorsed Angle despite having previously endorsed Angle's primary opponent, Sue Lowden. In September 2010, the SBA List launched a $150,000 campaign on behalf of New Hampshire Senate candidate Kelly Ayotte for the Republican primary. Ayotte won the primary to become the nominee, and later prevailed in the general election. In October 2010, the SBA List endorsed Joe Miller, Republican nominee for the U.S. Senate in Alaska. The SBA List endorsed Miller after Sen. Lisa Murkowski decided to stage a write-in campaign after losing the Republican primary to Miller, and they launched a $10,000 radio campaign to air ads attacking Murkowski for turning a "deaf ear" to the will of voters who voted her out in the primary. Murkowski defeated Miller, who conceded after two months of court battles over contested ballots.

==== Driehaus political ad litigation ====
In the 2010 campaign, the organization purchased billboard advertisements in the district of Rep. Steve Driehaus of Ohio that showed a photo of Driehaus and intoned, "Shame on Steve Driehaus! Driehaus voted FOR taxpayer-funded abortion" The advertisement referred to Driehaus's vote in favor of the health care overhaul bill. The SBA List has taken the position that the legislation in question allows for taxpayer-funded abortion, a claim which was ruled by a judge to be factually incorrect.

In response, Driehaus, who represented Ohio's heavily anti-abortion 1st congressional district, filed a complaint with the Ohio Elections Commission (OEC), saying the advertisements were false and violated Ohio election law. The OEC ruled in Driehaus' favor in a probable cause hearing on October 14, 2010. In response, the SBA List asked a federal judge to issue an injunction against the OEC on the grounds that the law at issue stifles free speech and that its ads were based on the group's own interpretation of the law. The ACLU of Ohio filed an 18-page amicus brief on the SBA List's behalf, arguing that the Ohio law in question is "unconstitutionally vague" and has a "chilling" effect on the SBA List's right to freedom of speech. A federal judge rejected the SBA List's federal lawsuit on abstention grounds and allowed Driehaus's OEC complaint to move forward.

After the OEC complaint was filed, the SBA List began airing a radio ad in Driehaus's district in which Dannenfelser stated that the group "[would] not be silenced or intimidated" by Driehaus's legal action. Driehaus persuaded the billboard company to withdraw the SBA List's advertisement, which was never erected. Driehaus lost the seat to Steve Chabot, the incumbent whom Driehaus had defeated two years earlier, in the November general election. Driehaus sued the SBA List in a second case on December 3, 2010, accusing the organization of defamation that caused him a "loss of livelihood".

The List continued to seek to have the law in question overturned; the ACLU joined in the organization's fight against the law. On August 1, 2011, judge Timothy Black dismissed the SBA List's challenge to the Ohio law, holding that the federal court lacked jurisdiction since the billboards were never erected and the OEC never made a final ruling and denied a motion for summary judgment by the List in the defamation case, allowing Driehaus's defamation claims regarding other SBA List statements to go forward. Black also directed the SBA List to desist from claiming on its website that the Patient Protection and Affordable Care Act (PPACA) subsidized abortion as the law does not directly mention abortion. SBA List argued that its statements were opinions and were thus protected, but the court rejected this argument given that SBA List itself had claimed that this was a "fact".

On August 19, 2011, the SBA List appealed the decision on the Ohio law to the Sixth Circuit Court of Appeals. In May 2013, the Sixth Circuit Court of Appeals ruled that the SBA List could not challenge the law under the First Amendment. On August 9, 2013, the SBA List petitioned the United States Supreme Court to review the law. On January 10, 2014, the Supreme Court accepted the case. The Court heard the case on April 22, 2014. On June 16, 2014, the United States Supreme Court ruled 9–0 in SBA List's favor, allowing them to proceed in challenging the constitutionality of the law. On September 11, 2014, Judge Timothy Black of the United States District Court for the Southern District of Ohio struck down the law as unconstitutional. Black said in his ruling, "We do not want the government (i. e., the Ohio Elections Commission) deciding what is political truth — for fear that the government might persecute those who criticize it. Instead, in a democracy, the voters should decide."

=== 2011 elections ===
In October 2011, the SBA List announced it would involve itself in the 2011 Virginia state Senate elections, endorsing challengers Bryce Reeves against Edd Houck, Caren Merrick against Barbara Favola for an open seat, Patricia Phillips against Mark Herring, and incumbent Sen. Jill Vogel in an effort to flip control of the state Senate, which the group described as a "graveyard for pro-life legislation". It also announced it was spending $25,000 against Sen. Edd Houck to expose his "extreme record on abortion". Merrick and Phillips lost, but Vogel won re-election and Reeves defeated Houck by just 222 votes.

=== 2012 presidential election ===
In 2011, the SBA List began to ask 2012 Republican presidential candidates to sign a pledge to appointing only anti-abortion judicial nominees and cabinet members, preventing taxpayer funding of abortion, and supporting legislation to ban abortions after 20 weeks of pregnancy based on the fetal pain concept. Candidates Rick Perry, Tim Pawlenty, Michele Bachmann, Newt Gingrich, Rick Santorum, Thaddeus McCotter, Herman Cain, and Ron Paul all signed the pledge, but Mitt Romney, Jon Huntsman, Jr., and Gary Johnson declined. Romney's refusal (he said the pledge might have "unintended consequences") sparked heated criticism from the SBA List, some of the other candidates, and political observers given Romney's past support for legalized abortion. Huntsman said he would not sign any pledges from political groups during the campaign, and was criticized by the SBA List as well. Cain initially said he agreed with the first three parts, but objected to the wording in the pledge which said he would have to "advance" the fetal pain bill; he said he would sign it but Congress would have to advance it. Cain later signed the pledge in November 2011. Johnson, who supports abortion rights, declined.

In August 2011, the SBA List, along with the Family Research Council and National Organization for Marriage, conducted a "Values Voter Bus Tour" in Iowa ahead of the Iowa Straw Poll. Candidates Pawlenty, Bachmann, and Santorum and other Republican elected officials, including Iowa Lt. Gov. Kim Reynolds and Reps. Steve King and Louie Gohmert, joined. The SBA List endorsed Rick Santorum for the nomination, spending $512,000 on his behalf. After Romney became the presumptive nominee for the Republican Party, the SBA List declared that former Secretary of State Condoleezza Rice was unqualified for vice president due to her describing herself as "mildly pro-choice". In August, SBA released an ad featuring anti-abortion activist Melissa Ohden who says she survived an abortion in 1977. The ad criticized Barack Obama, saying that while serving in the Illinois Senate, he voted four times to deny medical care to infants born alive during failed abortion procedures. In a 2008 analysis, FactCheck drew a mixed conclusion overall, finding both the SBA List and Obama had made misleading and/or inaccurate comments regarding Obama's voting record on the topic in question while he served in the United States Senate.

=== 2013 Virginia gubernatorial election ===
The SBA List made the 2013 Virginia gubernatorial election a priority for 2013, endorsing Ken Cuccinelli and pledging to spend $1.5 million in the election through its Virginia PAC, Women Speak Out. Cuccinelli was defeated narrowly in the general election by Democratic nominee Terry McAuliffe.

=== 2014 elections ===
The SBA List sought to spend $8 million to $10 million on elections in 2014.

=== 2016 elections ===
The SBA List spent $18 million in the 2016 elections.

=== 2017 elections ===
SBAL endorsed Karen Handel in the June 2017 special election for Georgia's 6th congressional district, spending $90,000 to support Handel.

=== 2018 elections ===
The SBA List typically endorses Republicans, but in 2018 they endorsed Democrat Dan Lipinski in a primary election against his challenger, Marie Newman, who favors abortion rights. The SBA List spent six figures on direct mail and other advertising for Lipinski in his primary, and sent a 70-person canvassing team to turn out voters for Lipinski. Lipinski is one of the few Democrats left that the group considers an ally, and Dannenfelser called him "a pro-life hero of legendary courage and integrity". After Lipinski voted against the Affordable Care Act due to concerns over taxpayer funding of abortion, the group told him "that they would always be there to fight for him if he ever came under fire". Lipinski won the primary by roughly 2,000 votes, and the SBA List, which knocked on 17,000 doors in the district to support Lipinski, was credited with helping him win.

=== 2022 rebranding ===
In June 2022, the group rebranded as Susan B. Anthony Pro-Life America. The new name is intended to parallel the name of NARAL Pro-Choice America.

=== 2024 elections ===
According to a Reuters report from July 2024, Marjorie Dannenfelser, President of Susan B. Anthony Pro-Life America, warned the Republican National Committee and Donald Trump to not weaken language on the party's platform referring to the federal government's role in restricting abortion access. Specifically, she warned that "it would be a miscalculation that would hurt party unity and destroy pro-life enthusiasm" before the 2024 election. According to a Fox News report published October 30, 2024, the Susan B. Anthony Pro-Life America engaged more than 1,000 students, as well as other canvassers of various ages and backgrounds, to reach out to persuadable voters in battleground states. The report also states that the non-profit raised $92 million and engaged canvassers to knock on more than 4 million doors in Arizona, Georgia, Michigan, Montana, North Carolina, Ohio, Pennsylvania and Wisconsin. One million of these door knocking visits were made by student canvassers. Their messaging was centered on the grounds that "Vice President Kamala Harris is too extreme on abortion."

== See also ==
- Concerned Women for America
