= Susan B. Anthony (disambiguation) =

Susan B. Anthony (1820–1906) was an American political activist.

Susan B. Anthony may also refer to:

- Susan B. Anthony II, American journalist and writer, activist and substance abuse counselor (great-niece of Susan B. Anthony)
- USS Susan B. Anthony, a ship
- Susan B. Anthony: A Biography of a Singular Feminist, a 2000 book by Kathleen Barry

== See also ==
- Susan B. Anthony Amendment or the Nineteenth Amendment to the United States Constitution
- Susan B. Anthony Birthplace Museum
- Susan B. Anthony Day
- Susan B. Anthony dollar
- Susan B. Anthony House, the home of Susan B. Anthony for forty years
- Susan B. Anthony Pro-Life America, an anti-abortion non-profit organization in the United States
- Elizabeth Cady Stanton and Susan B. Anthony Papers
- Frederick Douglass–Susan B. Anthony Memorial Bridge, a bridge in Rochester, New York
