= Susan B. Anthony Birthplace Museum =

Historic house in Massachusetts, United States

- U.S. National Register of Historic Places
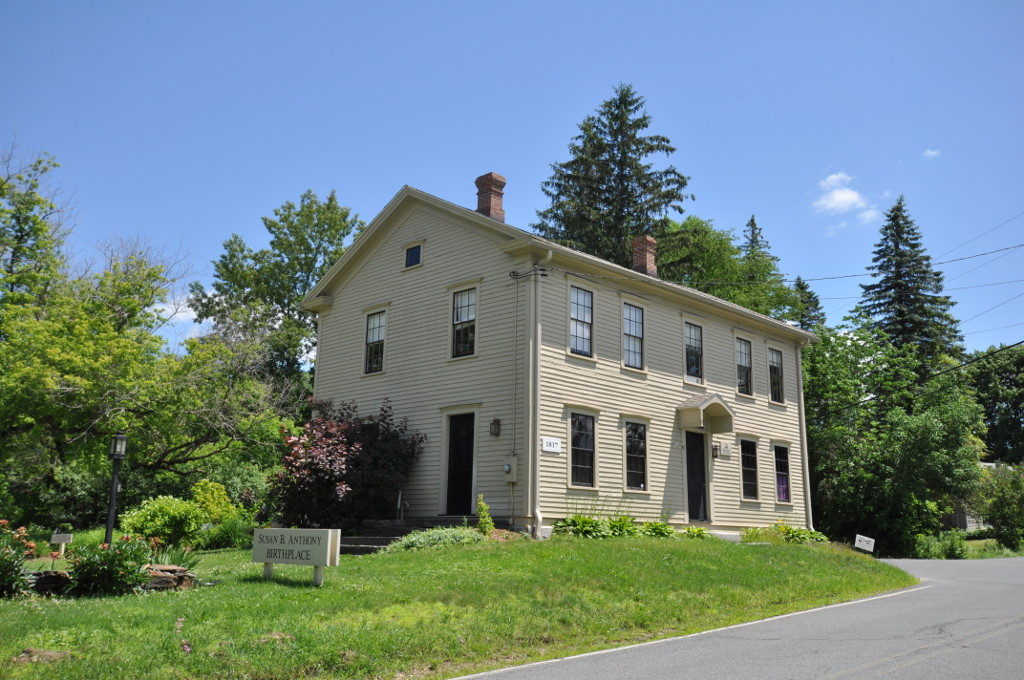
- Interactive map showing Susan B Anthony Birthplace museum
- Location: Adams, Massachusetts
- Coordinates: 42°36′55″N 73°6′10″W
- Built: 1817
- Architect: Anthony, Daniel
- Architectural style: Federal
- NRHP reference No.: 85000021
- Added to NRHP: January 3, 1985

The Susan B. Anthony Birthplace Museum is a historic house museum at 67 East Road in Adams, Massachusetts. It is notable as the birthplace of suffragist Susan B. Anthony in 1820 and for its association with early educators and industrialists in Adams. The property was listed on the National Register of Historic Places in 1985.

The house is now a learning center and museum dedicated to showcasing Susan B. Anthony's early years. One room is dedicated to Anthony's later activist life.

== House architecture ==
Built in 1817, the house is a conventional, center hall, 2.5-story colonial in the Federalist style. Twin chimneys rise from the building's center line. A modest 1.5-story ell was added onto the rear of the house, and a porch, added onto the side of the rear ell in the 1950s, was enclosed in the 1960s. A barn on the property was replaced by a modern garage, which houses the museum's gift shop. Inside the house, the original floorplan has been retained, with a central hall flanked by large public rooms in front of the house and smaller service rooms in the rear. The rear ell contains two small rooms. Most of the original woodwork has been retained, although one fireplace has been bricked up.

=== Museum displays ===
The museum shows Susan B. Anthony's daily family life and influences, such as her Quaker background, in the early 19th century and how the house was restored in 2006-2009 and museum consists of permanent and changing exhibits. The rooms include Kitchen and Heath, Daniel Anthony's store, the Birthing Room, the Portrait Gallery and the Legacy Room.

Kitchen and Hearth depicts the main gathering space for the Anthony family and their dependents, approximately 23 girls who worked in Daniel Anthony's 26-loom mill on Tophet Brook, across East Road.

Daniel Anthony's store, which Susan's father ran out of the northeast room of the family home to supply the needs of his textile workers and neighbors, has been recreated the way it may have been in 1817.

The Birthing Room is where the first five of the Anthony children were born.

The Portrait Gallery holds reproductions of Anthony family members and friends.

The Legacy Room contains a timeline from 1820 to 1906 with the major events of Anthony's life and important world events; an artifacts collection with period pieces; and ephemera, including suffrage postcards and meeting notices, which provide insight into the issues for which early feminists advocated, such as:

- Abolitionism. Anthony was raised by anti-slavery Quakers. Slavery was among the most pressing moral question of the mid-19th century, and the Civil War resulting from disputes around it, tore the nation apart. Anthony fought against slavery in her early adult years.
- The Temperance movement. Anthony became deeply involved in temperance, one of the great reform movements of the 19th century. In her temperance work, she experienced the relative voicelessness of women in the political process. She began advocating for suffrage as a means to influence moral and social reforms.
- Suffrage. After the Civil War, Anthony devoted her life to women's suffrage. Others continued the work after her death, and the 19th amendment was passed in 1920, giving women the right to vote.

== History ==
The first of the Anthonys to arrive in Adams, Massachusetts, was David Anthony, the great-grandfather of Susan B. Anthony, in the years before the American Revolutionary War. He came as part of a more general migration of Quakers to the area from Rhode Island and southeastern Massachusetts. He established a cider mill that remains in the Anthony family to this day. His grandson, David Anthony, built this house in 1817 as a gift to his son, Daniel Anthony, the father of Susan B. Anthony. David was a strong proponent of education, teaching at the East Road School, and joining with others in the tightly knit Quaker community to found the Adams Academy in 1825 on land owned by his father. Daniel Anthony also continued the family interest in mills, establishing a cotton yarn-producing mill, known as the Pump Log Mill, in 1822.

It is in this house that his second child, Susan Anthony, was born on February 15, 1820. In 1827 he was lured by financial interests to Battenville, New York.

The house remained in Anthony family hands until 1895, after which it went through a succession of owners. The Society of Friends Descendants acquired the property in 1926, and established a museum. The building was returned to private hands in 1949. It underwent restoration from 2006 to 2009. It is now home to the nonprofit Susan B. Anthony Birthplace Museum, showcasing Susan B. Anthony's early years and her legacy as a tireless advocate of women's right to vote.

On October 9, 2019, The Berkshire Eagle reported that Colleen Janz, the director of the museum from 2012 to 2018, was fired on July 23, 2018, for allegedly stealing $31,000 from the museum through falsified transactions.

== Susan B. Anthony abortion dispute ==
One of the exhibits is about Restellism, a name for abortion that was first heard in a popular lecture, portions of which were reprinted on March 4, 1869, by editors Elizabeth Cady Stanton and Parker Pillsbury in the pages of Anthony's newspaper The Revolution. The display describes how suffragists took a stance opposing the practice of restellism, the term used at the time for abortion. It shows 122 references taken from Anthony's newspaper—mentions of Restellism which offer insight into how the women's rights activists came to oppose this practice.

The owner of the museum is Carol Crossed who is an anti-abortion feminist. The museum's initial mission statement included "raising public awareness" of Anthony's "wide-ranging legacy" including her being "a pioneering feminist and suffragist as well as a noteworthy figure in the abolitionist, opposition to restellism and temperance movements of the 19th century" (emphasis added.)

A local paper reported that the exhibit about Restellism implies that the rejection of advertisements shows Anthony's personal views about abortion. Three opening day protesters said the museum's leadership was "inferring upon [Anthony] an unproven historical stance." They also said that the directors were pushing an anti-abortion agenda. Answering this assertion, Crossed said, "the pro-life views expressed in Anthony's newspaper, The Revolution, will not be excluded from the exhibition."

== See also ==
- List of monuments and memorials to women's suffrage
- National Register of Historic Places listings in Berkshire County, Massachusetts
