= Frederick Douglass–Susan B. Anthony Memorial Bridge =

Bridge on Interstate 490 over the Genesee River near Downtown Rochester, New York

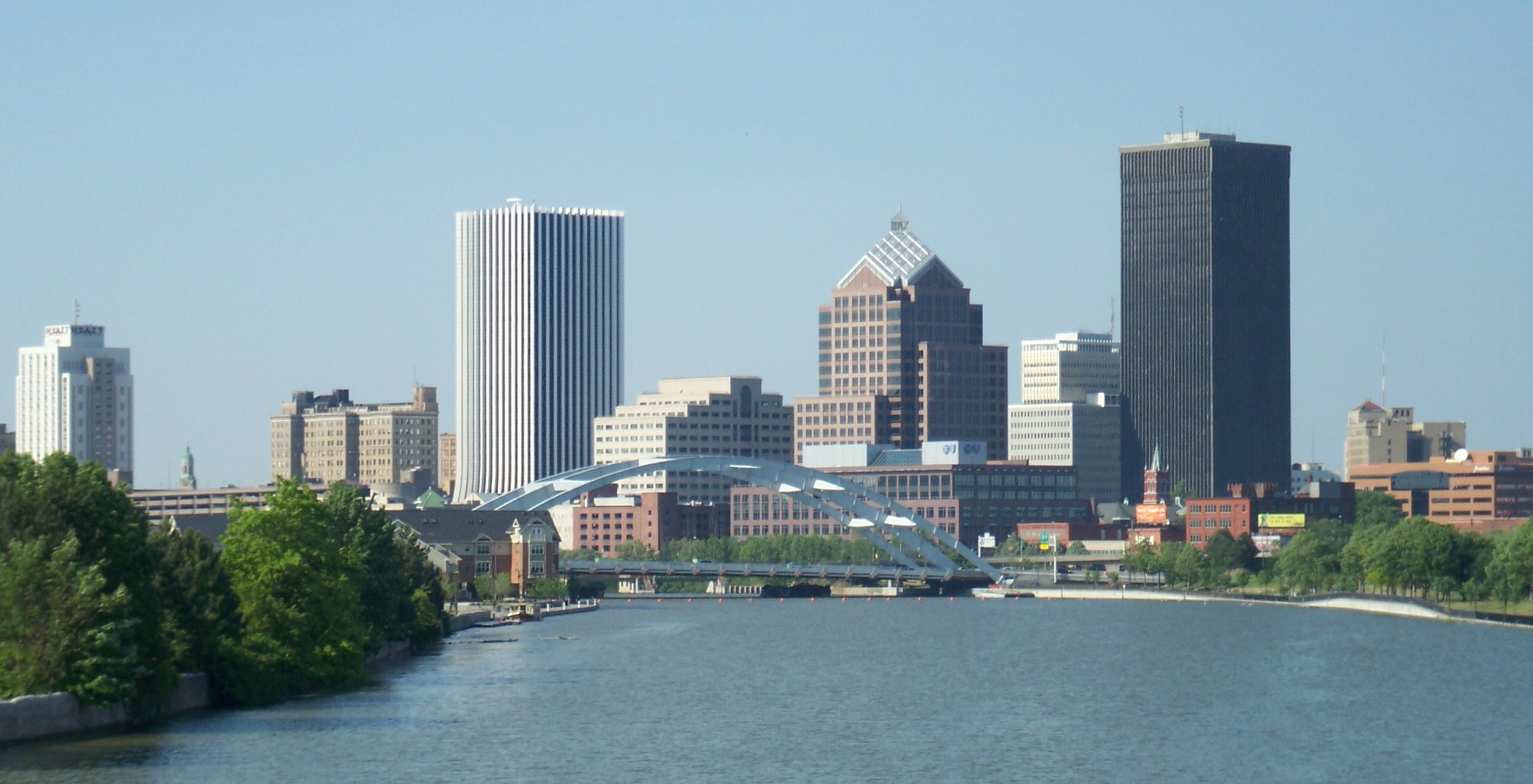
- Downtown Rochester as seen from Ford Street, with the bridge in the center foreground.
- Coordinates: 43.15108°N 77.60908°W
- Carries: Eight lanes of I-490
- Crosses: Genesee River and NY 383
- Locale: Rochester, New York, Monroe County
- Maintained by: NYSDOT
- ID number: 4050129

Characteristics
- Design: Triple steel tied arch
- Total length: 364 m (1,194 ft)
- Width: 39.8 m (130.6 ft)
- Longest span: 140.9 m (462.3 ft)

History
- Construction start: April 2004
- Construction end: June 18, 2007
- Opened: June 18, 2007

Statistics
- Daily traffic: 71,640 (2008 est.)

Location
- Interactive map of Frederick Douglass–Susan B. Anthony Memorial Bridge

The Frederick Douglass–Susan B. Anthony Memorial Bridge (informally called the Freddie-Sue Bridge and known as the Troup–Howell Bridge until July 13, 2007) is a triple steel arch bridge carrying Interstate 490 (I-490) over the Genesee River and New York State Route 383 (NY 383, named Exchange Boulevard) in downtown Rochester, New York. The bridge, officially completed on June 18, 2007, replaced a 50-year-old multi-girder bridge situated in the same location.

== Description ==
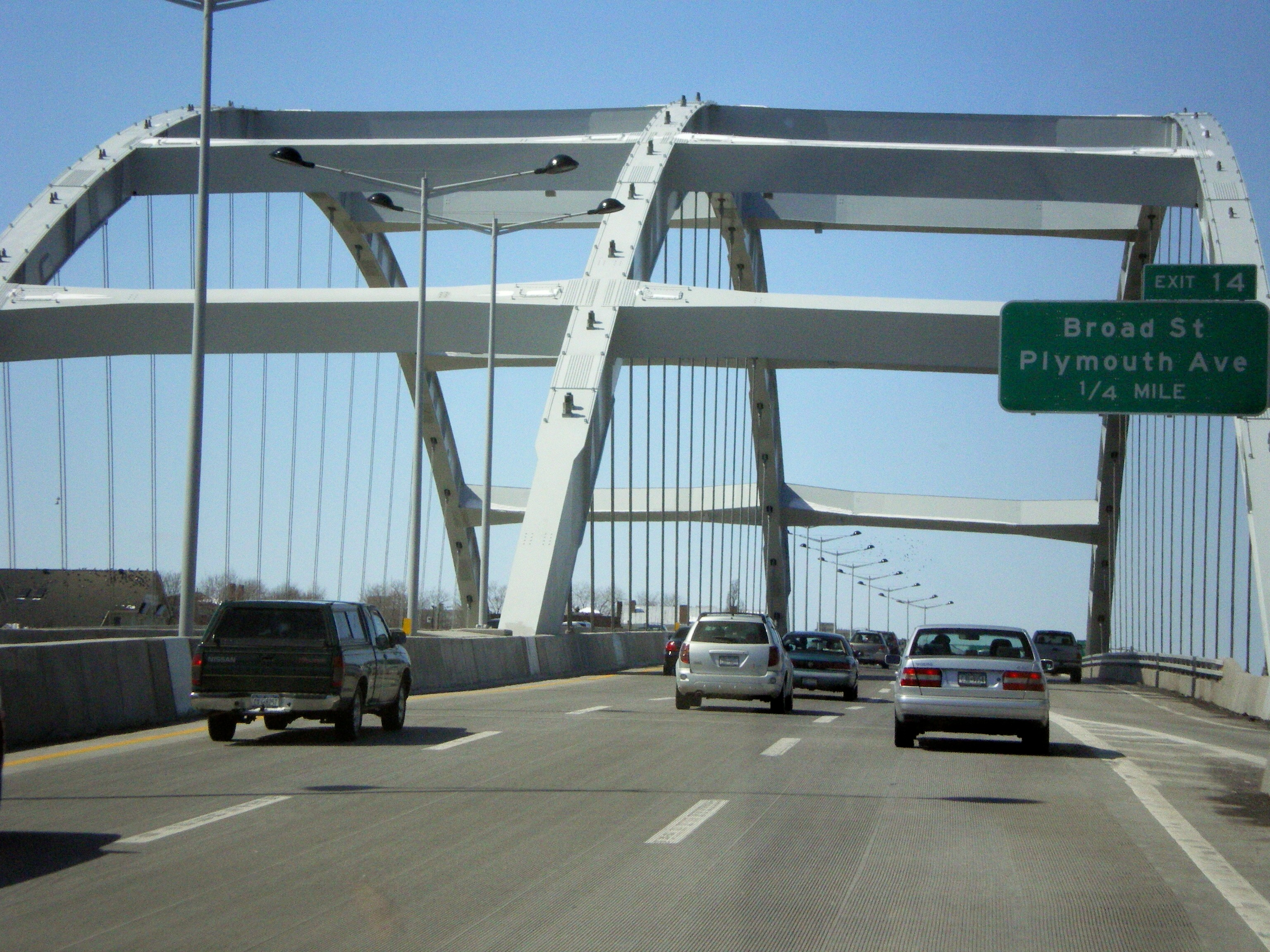
The Douglass-Anthony Bridge as seen from I-490 westbound

The bridge is 364 meters (1,194 ft) in length, with the longest span, the arch-supported roadway crossing the Genesee, encompassing 140.9 meters (462.3 ft). The structure is 39.8 meters (130.6 ft) wide. The roadway on its surface is eight lanes wide, with four reserved for each direction of I-490. The structure carries an estimated 71,640 vehicles daily over NY 383 and the Genesee.

The New York State Department of Transportation is responsible for maintenance on the bridge.

== History ==
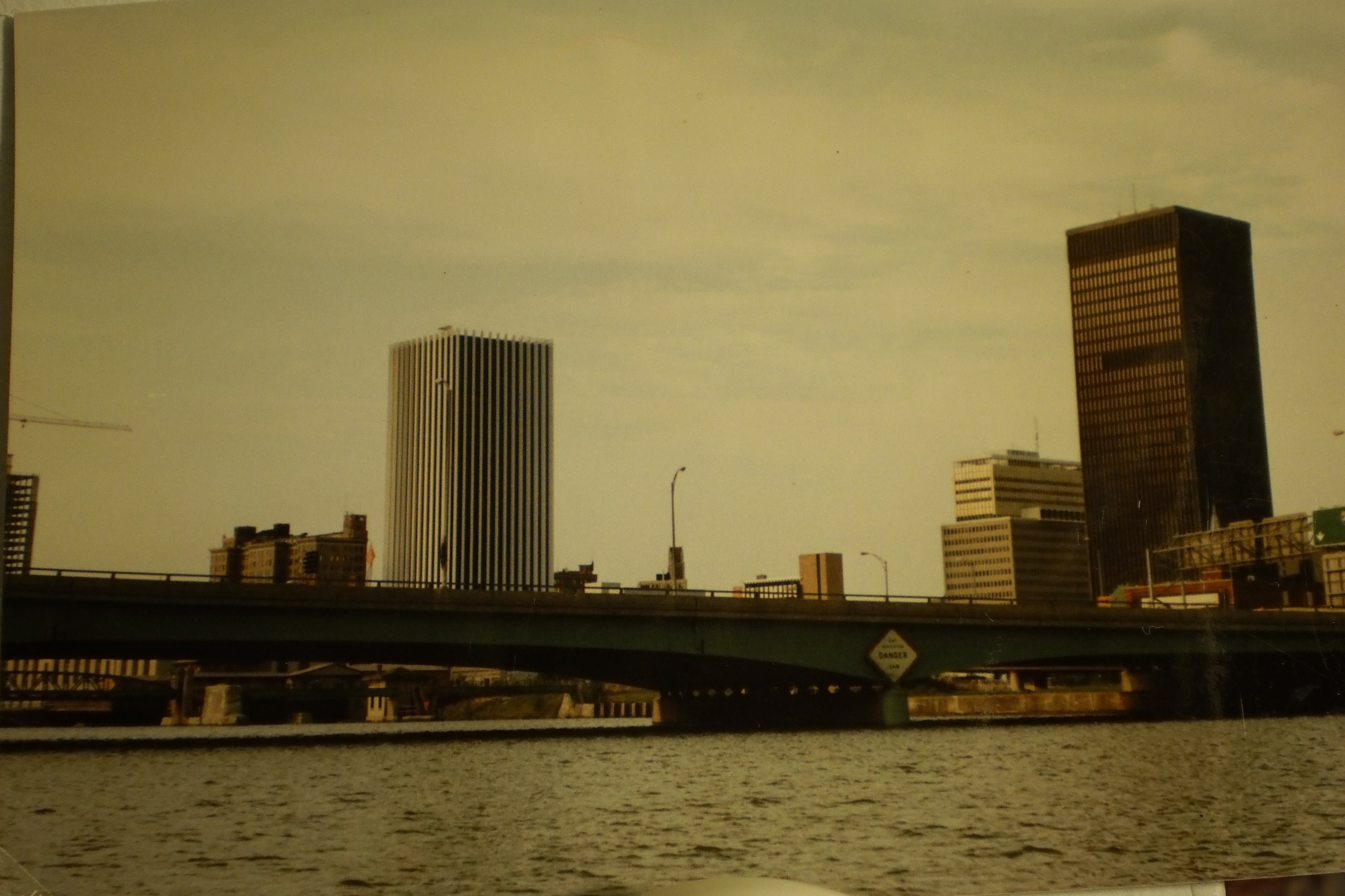
The old Troup-Howell Bridge

The original Troup–Howell Bridge was constructed in 1954, and reconfigured in 1974 to become part of the federal Interstate system. By 1996, the bridge had deteriorated enough that the New York State Department of Transportation determined it was time to replace it.

Construction on the new bridge began in May 2004. To prevent the flow of traffic from being halted on I-490, the construction of the arch bridge and the demolition of the girder bridge were done in stages, which allowed a minimum of four lanes of traffic, two in each direction, to be open at all times. On June 18, 2007, the bridge was officially completed and fully open to traffic for the first time.

In a ceremony at the bridge on July 13, 2007, the bridge was renamed the "Frederick Douglass–Susan B. Anthony Memorial Bridge", honoring Frederick Douglass and Susan B. Anthony, both of whom had lived in Rochester.

In 2024, the bridge was given its first repainting.
