= Susan B. Anthony House =

Historic house museum in Rochester, New York

- U.S. National Register of Historic Places
- U.S. National Historic Landmark
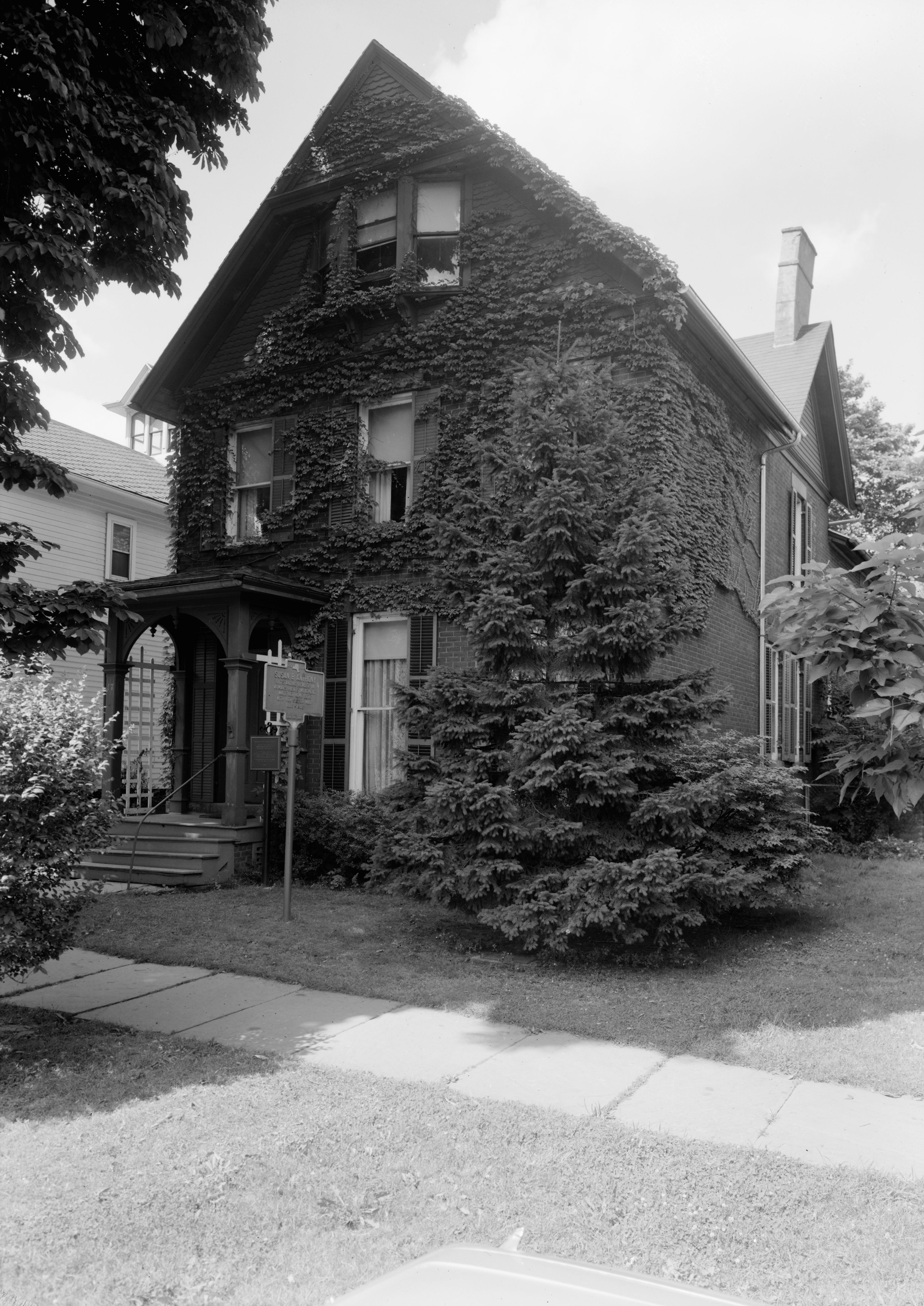
- The Susan B. Anthony House at 17 Madison Street, Rochester, New York
- Location: 17 Madison Street, Rochester, New York, U.S.
- Coordinates: 43.1553°N 77.6258°W
- Built: 1859–1864
- Architectural style: Italianate
- Website: susanb.org
- NRHP reference No.: 66000528

Significant dates
- Added to NRHP: October 15, 1966
- Designated NHL: June 23, 1965

The Susan B. Anthony House is a historic house museum at 17 Madison Street in Rochester, New York, United States. The two-story Italianate brick house was the home of women's suffrage leader Susan B. Anthony from 1866 until her death in 1906, and is the site where she was arrested in 1872 for voting illegally in a federal election. The house was designated a National Historic Landmark on June 23, 1965, and was listed on the National Register of Historic Places on October 15, 1966. It has been operated as a museum since 1945 by a nonprofit corporation, Susan B. Anthony Museum & House, Inc.

The museum campus includes three buildings and draws approximately 13,000 visitors annually, a figure constrained by the house's 35-person fire occupancy limit. A planned expansion at a nearby site is expected to increase annual capacity to 30,000–50,000 visitors.

== History ==
=== Construction and early owners ===
The house was built between 1859 and 1864 by dentist Husted Wanzer. It is a twelve-room, two-story Italianate brick structure designed for middle-class occupants, featuring an ornamental wood entrance porch and a shingled front gable with an oriel window. The house's original address was 7 Madison Street; the city renumbered it to 17 Madison Street in 1884.

=== Anthony family residence (1866–1907) ===
In 1864, Aaron McLean, the husband of Susan B. Anthony's sister Guelma, moved into the house as a tenant. In 1866, Anthony, her sister Mary S. Anthony, and their mother Lucy Read Anthony moved into the home. Lucy Read Anthony purchased the house in 1866 for $3,500, and Mary S. Anthony subsequently purchased it from their mother in 1873 for $4,500.

The house served as both a private residence and a center of the women's suffrage movement in the United States. After Anthony was elected president of the National American Woman Suffrage Association (NAWSA) in 1892, the organization's operational headquarters moved to the Madison Street home. In 1895, a third story was added to the house to accommodate research materials for the History of Woman Suffrage, the multi-volume work Anthony co-authored with Elizabeth Cady Stanton and Matilda Joslyn Gage. In 1897, the roof was raised and a telephone was installed.

Susan B. Anthony died at the house on March 13, 1906, at the age of 86. Mary S. Anthony died on February 5, 1907, after which the house was sold to Margaret A. Howard for $5,700.

=== 1872 arrest ===
On November 5, 1872, Anthony and fourteen other women attempted to vote at a polling place in Rochester's Eighth Ward. On November 18, 1872, a United States Marshal arrested Anthony in the front parlor of the Madison Street house for violating the Enforcement Act of 1870, which made it a federal crime to vote without the legal right to do so. Anthony was the only one of the group to be indicted and brought to trial. At her trial in June 1873, Judge Ward Hunt directed the jury to return a guilty verdict without deliberation and fined Anthony $100. She refused to pay the fine and was never imprisoned for the offense.

=== Post-Anthony ownership (1907–1945) ===
After the Anthony family's tenure, the house passed through several owners and was converted to multi-unit housing. Margaret A. Howard sold the house to Julius Boreau in 1911, who converted it into a rooming house. Eugene and Mary Carey purchased the property between 1921 and 1935 and operated it as a boarding house. Electricity was installed in 1920.

== Museum ==
=== Founding and early decades ===
In 1944, the Rochester Federation of Women's Clubs placed a marker at the house recognizing its historical significance. The following year, leaders of the Rochester Federation of Women's Clubs purchased the house for $8,500 and began its conversion into a museum. In 1948, a New York State Historic Marker was placed at the site.

The museum was managed entirely by volunteer caretakers for its first 47 years of operation, from 1945 until 1992. In March 1971, the organization received 501(c)(3) tax-exempt status from the Internal Revenue Service.

=== Professional management ===
In 1992, the museum hired its first paid professional executive director. The corporation was renamed "Susan B. Anthony House, Inc." in 1997.

Deborah Hughes became President and CEO of the museum in 2007 and served until the end of 2025. During her tenure, the museum completed major restorations of the house interior, expanded the campus, and initiated planning for a new expansion facility. Allison Hinman succeeded Hughes as President and CEO effective January 2, 2026.

=== 2020 centennial celebrations ===
The year 2020 marked the centennial of the Nineteenth Amendment, Anthony's 200th birthday, and the 75th anniversary of the museum. The museum organized several commemorative programs, including the 2020 Quilt Project, which assembled 325 textile blocks created by artists from the United States and Canada. The museum also participated in a suffrage centennial float at the Rose Bowl Parade.

=== 2021 arson ===
On September 26, 2021, a fire at approximately 1:00 a.m. damaged the house's back porch and doorway, with water damage sustained inside the building. Museum president Deborah Hughes confirmed the fire was arson. On December 17, 2021, a second arson attempt caused minor additional damage.

=== 2024 polling place ===
For the 2024 United States presidential election, the museum's Carriage House was remodeled and designated as an early voting polling place, with a second exit door installed to meet New York State election requirements. On its first day of operation, 721 people cast ballots at the site. Commentators noted the historical irony that voters were casting legal ballots at the same property where Anthony had been arrested in 1872 for the act of voting.

== Campus ==
The museum operates a campus of three buildings along Madison Street, in addition to a nearby public park.

=== 17 Madison Street ===
The National Historic Landmark house at 17 Madison Street is the centerpiece of the campus. The building contains period-furnished rooms and interpretive exhibits about Anthony's life and the women's suffrage movement.

=== 19 Madison Street ===
The house at 19 Madison Street was formerly the home of Anthony's sister Hannah Anthony Mosher. The museum acquired the property in 1994 through a Community Development Block Grant. Since 1998, the building has housed the Visitor Center, museum shop, and introductory exhibit space.

=== Carriage House ===
The Carriage House, built in 1998, has a capacity of 35 to 40 people and is used for programs and events. In 2024, it was remodeled with a second exit door to serve as an early voting polling place for the presidential election.

=== 16 Madison Street ===
The Queen Anne–style house at 16 Madison Street was donated to the museum by Key Bank and Flower City Habitat for Humanity for $1 in 2000. After renovation, it was named the Ruth Miller Brody Administrative Office Building and has housed the museum's administrative offices since 2003.

=== Susan B. Anthony Square Park ===
Susan B. Anthony Square Park, located near the museum campus, features Let's Have Tea, a 2001 bronze sculpture by Pepsy Kettavong depicting Anthony and Frederick Douglass seated at a table. Anthony and Douglass were contemporaries in Rochester and collaborated in the abolitionist and suffrage movements.

== Restoration ==
=== Historic Structures Report ===
In 2000, the National Park Service provided federal funding for a Historic Structures Report, which established the period of significance for the house as 1898 to 1906, corresponding to the years when Anthony lived there as NAWSA president.

=== Exterior restoration ===
In 2002, the museum received a $300,000 matching grant through the Save America's Treasures program for restoration work. Phase I restoration, completed between 2004 and 2005 at a cost of approximately $600,000, addressed the building's exterior, foundation, roof, chimneys, and heating, cooling, electrical, and security systems.

=== Interior restoration ===
Between 2007 and 2013, the museum undertook interior period restoration of the dining room, parlors, study, and bedrooms, including restoration of historic plaster and wall coverings. The restoration was designed by John G. Waite Associates, PLLC, a firm specializing in historic preservation. As of the 2020s, the restoration is approximately 90 percent complete.

== Historic designations ==
The Susan B. Anthony House was designated a National Historic Landmark on June 23, 1965, and was listed on the National Register of Historic Places on October 15, 1966 (NRIS reference number 66000528). The Historic American Buildings Survey documented the property under survey number NY-6045, producing seven photographs and one caption page. Fewer than three percent of all National Register sites carry the NHL designation, and fewer than ten percent of those focus on women's history.

In 1977, the surrounding nine-block area was listed on the National Register as the Susan B. Anthony Preservation District.

== Expansion ==
=== Planned facility ===
The museum has announced plans to construct a new facility called "1 Jefferson" at the corner of Brown Street and Jefferson Avenue, approximately 900 feet (270 m) from the existing campus. The facility is planned at 14,000 to 15,000 square feet, including a 6,000-square-foot immersive exhibit area.

=== Funding ===
The expansion has a fundraising goal of $25 million. In February 2023, New York Governor Kathy Hochul committed $10 million from the state's fiscal year 2024 budget toward the project. As of February 2023, the museum had raised $15.8 million toward the goal.

=== Design and timeline ===
The architectural design is by SWBR, a Rochester-based firm, with exhibit design by Solid Light, Inc. The expansion is expected to increase the museum's annual capacity from approximately 13,000 visitors to 30,000–50,000. Groundbreaking is planned for 2026, with the facility projected to open in 2027 or 2028.

== Operations ==
The museum is open Tuesday through Sunday from 11:00 a.m. to 5:00 p.m. Admission is $20 for adults, $15 for seniors and active military, $8 for students and children, and $3 through the Museums for All program. Annual attendance is approximately 13,000 visitors, constrained by the National Historic Landmark house's fire code occupancy limit of 35 people.

The museum is operated by Susan B. Anthony Museum & House, Inc. (formerly Susan B. Anthony House, Inc.), a 501(c)(3) nonprofit corporation (EIN 23-7098699) that has held tax-exempt status since March 1971. For the fiscal year ending May 2024, the organization reported total revenue of $1,265,289, total expenses of $1,141,778, and net assets of $4,370,723.

== See also ==
- Susan B. Anthony
- Trial of Susan B. Anthony
- Women's suffrage in the United States
- National American Woman Suffrage Association
- History of Woman Suffrage
- Frederick Douglass
- National Register of Historic Places listings in Rochester, New York
- List of National Historic Landmarks in New York
- Susan B. Anthony Preservation District
- Susan B. Anthony Square Park
