= Susan B. Anthony =

American women's rights activist (1820–1906)

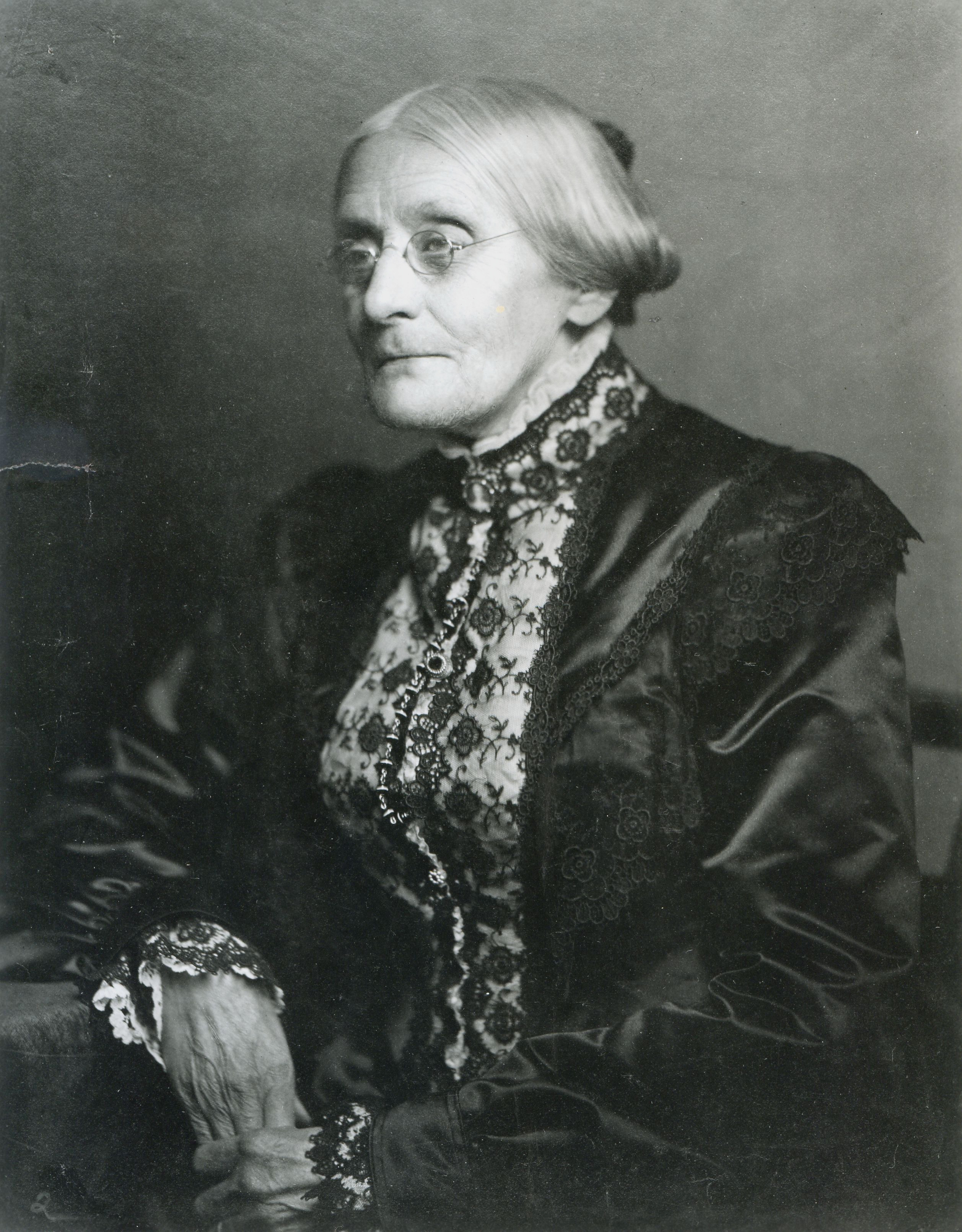
- Anthony in 1890
- Born: Susan Anthony; February 15, 1820; Adams, Massachusetts, U.S.
- Died: March 13, 1906 (aged 86); Rochester, New York, U.S.
- Resting place: Mount Hope Cemetery (Rochester, New York)
- Known for: Advocacy of: women's suffrage; women's rights; abolitionism
- Relatives: Daniel Read Anthony (brother); Mary Stafford Anthony (sister); Daniel Read Anthony Jr. (nephew); Susan B. Anthony II (great-niece)

Susan B. Anthony (born Susan Anthony; February 15, 1820 – March 13, 1906) was an American social reformer and women's rights activist who played a pivotal role in the women's suffrage movement. Born into a Quaker family committed to social equality, she collected anti-slavery petitions at the age of 17. In 1856, she became the New York state agent for the American Anti-Slavery Society.

In 1851, she met Elizabeth Cady Stanton, who became her lifelong friend and co-worker in social reform activities, primarily in the field of women's rights. Together they founded the New York Women's State Temperance Society after Anthony was prevented from speaking at a temperance conference because she was female. During the Civil War they founded the Women's Loyal National League, which conducted the largest petition drive in United States history up to that time, collecting nearly 400,000 signatures in support of the abolition of slavery. After the war, they initiated the American Equal Rights Association, which campaigned for equal rights for all, including both women and African Americans. They began publishing a women's rights newspaper in 1868 called The Revolution. A year later, they founded the National Woman Suffrage Association as part of a split in the women's movement. The split was formally healed in 1890 when their organization merged with the rival American Woman Suffrage Association to form the National American Woman Suffrage Association, with Anthony as its key force. Anthony and Stanton began working with Matilda Joslyn Gage in 1876 on what eventually grew into the six-volume History of Woman Suffrage. The interests of Anthony and Stanton diverged somewhat in later years, but the two remained close friends.

In 1872, Anthony was arrested in her hometown of Rochester, New York, for voting in violation of laws that allowed only men to vote. She was convicted in a widely publicized trial. Although she refused to pay the fine, the authorities declined to take further action. In 1878, Anthony and Stanton arranged for Congress to be presented with an amendment giving women the right to vote. Introduced by Senator Aaron A. Sargent, it later became known colloquially as the Susan B. Anthony Amendment. It was eventually ratified as the Nineteenth Amendment to the U.S. Constitution in 1920.

Anthony traveled extensively in support of women's suffrage, giving as many as 75 to 100 speeches per year and working on many state campaigns. She worked internationally for women's rights, playing a key role in creating the International Council of Women, which is still active. She also helped to bring about the World's Congress of Representative Women at the World's Columbian Exposition in Chicago in 1893.

When she first began campaigning for women's rights, Anthony was harshly ridiculed and accused of trying to destroy the institution of marriage. Public perception of her changed radically during her lifetime, however. Her 80th birthday was celebrated in the White House at the invitation of President William McKinley. She became the first female citizen to be depicted on U.S. coinage when her portrait appeared on the 1979 dollar coin.

== Early life ==
Susan Anthony was born on February 15, 1820, to Daniel Anthony and Lucy Read Anthony in Adams, Massachusetts, the second-oldest of seven children. She was named for her maternal grandmother Susanah, and for her father's sister Susan. In her youth, she and her sisters responded to a "great craze for middle initials" by adding middle initials to their own names. Anthony adopted "B." as her middle initial because her namesake Aunt Susan had married a man named Brownell. Anthony never used the name Brownell herself, and did not like it.

Her family shared a passion for social reform. Her brothers Daniel and Merritt moved to Kansas to support the anti-slavery movement there. Merritt fought with John Brown against pro-slavery forces during the Bleeding Kansas crisis. Daniel eventually owned a newspaper and became mayor of Leavenworth. Anthony's sister Mary, with whom she shared a home in later years, became a public school principal in Rochester, and a woman's rights activist.

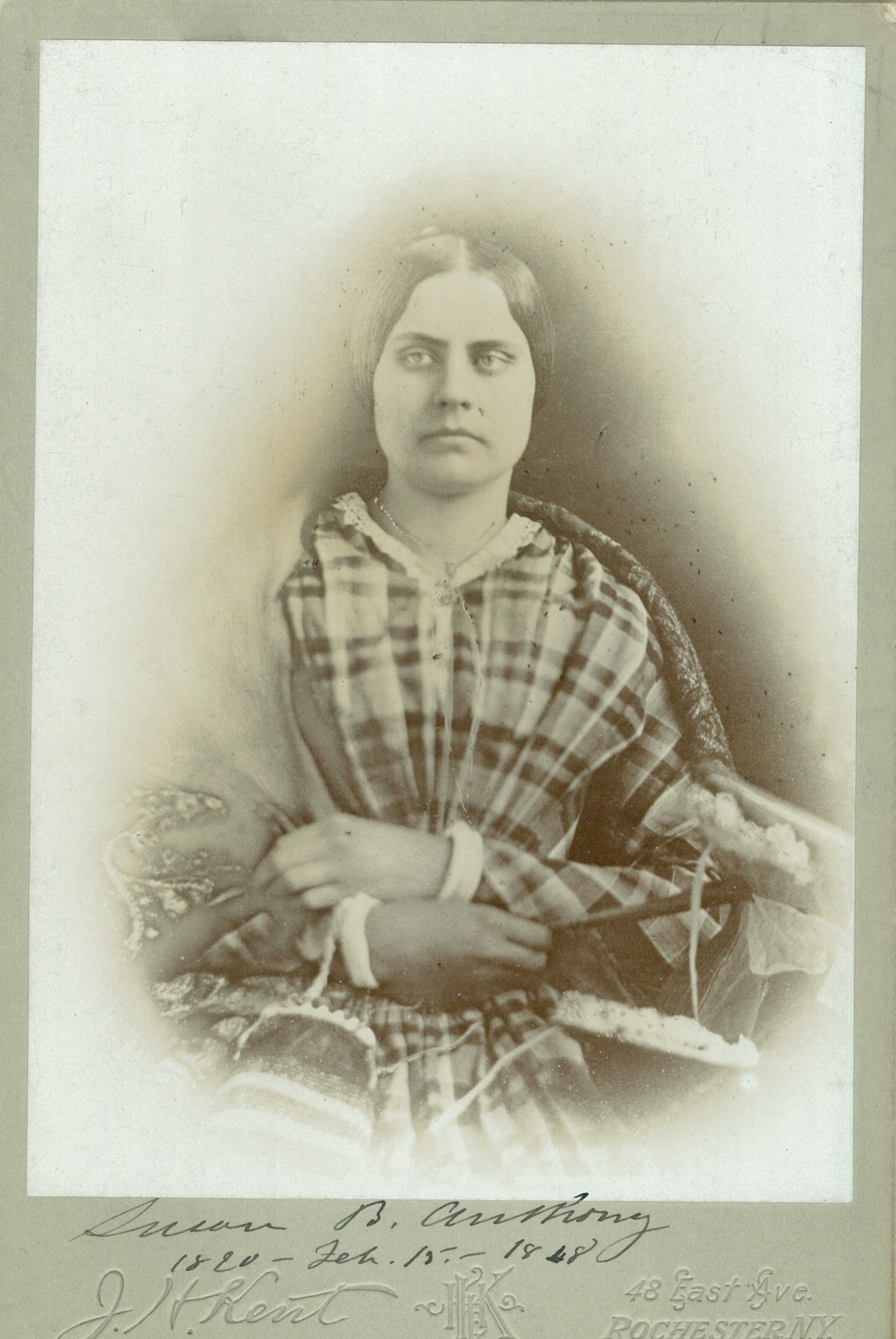
Anthony in 1848; at age 28

Anthony's father was an abolitionist and a temperance advocate. A Quaker, he had a difficult relationship with his traditionalist congregation, which rebuked him for marrying a non-Quaker, and then disowned him for allowing a dance school to operate in his home. He continued to attend Quaker meetings anyway and became even more radical in his beliefs. Anthony's mother was a Baptist and helped raise their children in a more tolerant version of her husband's religious tradition. Their father encouraged them all, girls as well as boys, to be self-supporting, teaching them business principles and giving them responsibilities at an early age.

When Anthony was six years old, her family moved to Battenville, New York, where her father managed a large cotton mill. Previously he had operated his own small cotton factory.

When she was seventeen, Anthony was sent to a Quaker boarding school in Philadelphia, where she unhappily endured its strict and sometimes humiliating atmosphere. She was forced to end her studies after one term because her family was financially ruined during an economic downturn known as the Panic of 1837. They were forced to sell everything they had at an auction, but they were rescued by her maternal uncle, who bought most of their belongings and restored them to the family. To assist her family financially, Anthony left home to teach at a Quaker boarding school.

In 1845, the family moved to a farm on the outskirts of Rochester, New York, purchased partly with the inheritance of Anthony's mother, and the family became active in the anti-slavery movement. There they associated with a group of Quaker social reformers who had left their congregation because of the restrictions it placed on reform activities, and who in 1848 formed a new organization called the Congregational Friends. The Anthony farmstead soon became the Sunday afternoon gathering place for local activists, including Frederick Douglass, a former slave and a prominent abolitionist who became Anthony's lifelong friend.

The Anthony family began to attend services at the First Unitarian Church of Rochester, which was associated with social reform. The Rochester Women's Rights Convention of 1848 was held at that church in 1848, inspired by the Seneca Falls Convention, the first women's rights convention, which was held two weeks earlier in a nearby town. Anthony's parents and her sister Mary attended the Rochester convention and signed the Declaration of Sentiments that had been first adopted by the Seneca Falls Convention.

Anthony did not take part in either of these conventions because she had moved to Canajoharie in 1846 to be headmistress of the female department of the Canajoharie Academy. Away from Quaker influences for the first time in her life, at the age of 26 she began to replace her plain clothing with more stylish dresses, and she quit using "thee" and other forms of speech traditionally used by Quakers. She was interested in social reform, and she was distressed at being paid much less than men with similar jobs, but she was amused at her father's enthusiasm over the Rochester women's rights convention. She later explained, "I wasn't ready to vote, didn't want to vote, but I did want equal pay for equal work."

When the Canajoharie Academy closed in 1849, Anthony took over the operation of the family farm in Rochester so her father could devote more time to his insurance business. She worked at this task for a couple of years but found herself increasingly drawn to reform activity. With her parents' support, she was soon fully engaged in reform work. For the rest of her life, she lived almost entirely on fees she earned as a speaker.

== Activism ==
=== Early social activism ===
Cautious, careful people, always casting about to preserve their reputation and social standing, never can bring about a reform. Those who are really in earnest must be willing to be anything or nothing in the world's estimation, and publicly and privately, in season and out, avow their sympathy with despised and persecuted ideas and their advocates, and bear the consequences.

— Susan B. Anthony, 1860

Anthony embarked on her career of social reform with energy and determination. Schooling herself in reform issues, she found herself drawn to the more radical ideas of people like William Lloyd Garrison, George Thompson and Elizabeth Cady Stanton. Soon she was wearing the controversial Bloomer dress, consisting of pantaloons worn under a knee-length dress. Although she felt it was more sensible than the traditional heavy dresses that dragged the ground, she reluctantly quit wearing it after a year because it gave her opponents the opportunity to focus on her apparel rather than her ideas.

==== Partnership with Elizabeth Cady Stanton ====
In 1851, Anthony was introduced to Elizabeth Cady Stanton, who had been one of the organizers of the Seneca Falls Convention and had introduced the controversial resolution in support of women's suffrage. Anthony and Stanton were introduced by Amelia Bloomer, a feminist and mutual acquaintance. Anthony and Stanton soon became close friends and co-workers, forming a relationship that was pivotal for them and for the women's movement as a whole. After the Stantons moved from Seneca Falls to New York City in 1861, a room was set aside for Anthony in every house they lived in. One of Stanton's biographers estimated that over her lifetime, Stanton probably spent more time with Anthony than with any other adult, including her own husband.

The two women had complementary skills. Anthony excelled at organizing, while Stanton had an aptitude for intellectual matters and writing. Anthony was dissatisfied with her own writing ability and wrote relatively little for publication. When historians illustrate her thoughts with direct quotes, they usually take them from her speeches, letters, and diary entries.

Because Stanton was homebound with seven children while Anthony was unmarried and free to travel, Anthony assisted Stanton by supervising her children while Stanton wrote. One of Anthony's biographers said, "Susan became one of the family and was almost another mother to Mrs. Stanton's children." A biography of Stanton says that during the early years of their relationship, "Stanton provided the ideas, rhetoric, and strategy; Anthony delivered the speeches, circulated petitions, and rented the halls. Anthony prodded and Stanton produced." Stanton's husband said, "Susan stirred the puddings, Elizabeth stirred up Susan, and then Susan stirs up the world!" Stanton herself said, "I forged the thunderbolts, she fired them." By 1854, Anthony and Stanton "had perfected a collaboration that made the New York State movement the most sophisticated in the country", according to Ann D. Gordon, a professor of women's history.

==== Temperance activities ====
At that time, Temperance was a women's rights issue. Laws gave husbands complete control of the family and its finances; a woman with a drunken husband had little legal recourse even if his alcoholism left the family destitute and he was abusive to her and their children. If she obtained a divorce, which was difficult to do, he could easily end up with sole guardianship of the children.

While teaching in Canajoharie, Anthony joined the Daughters of Temperance and in 1849 gave her first public speech at one of its meetings. In 1852, she was elected as a delegate to the state temperance convention, but the chairman stopped her when she tried to speak, saying that women delegates were there only to listen and learn. Anthony and some other women immediately walked out and announced a meeting of their own, which created a committee to organize a women's state convention. Largely organized by Anthony, the convention of 500 women met in Rochester in April and created the Women's State Temperance Society, with Stanton as president and Anthony as state agent.

Anthony and her co-workers collected 28,000 signatures on a petition for a law to prohibit the sale of alcohol in New York State. She organized a hearing on that law before the New York legislature, the first that had been initiated in that state by a group of women. At the organization's convention the following year, however, conservative members attacked Stanton's advocacy of the right of a wife of an alcoholic to obtain a divorce. Stanton was voted out as president, whereupon she and Anthony resigned from the organization.

In 1853, Anthony attended the World's Temperance Convention in New York City, which bogged down for three chaotic days in a dispute about whether women would be allowed to speak there. Years later, Anthony observed, "No advanced step taken by women has been so bitterly contested as that of speaking in public. For nothing which they have attempted, not even to secure the suffrage, have they been so abused, condemned and antagonized." After this period, Anthony focused her energy on abolitionist and women's rights activities.

==== Teachers' conventions ====
When Anthony tried to speak at the New York State Teachers' Association meeting in 1853, her attempt sparked a half-hour debate among the men about whether it was proper for women to speak in public. Finally allowed to continue, Anthony said, "Do you not see that so long as society says a woman is incompetent to be a lawyer, minister, or doctor, but has ample ability to be a teacher, that every man of you who chooses this profession tacitly acknowledges that he has no more brains than a woman." At the 1857 teacher's convention, she introduced a resolution calling for the admission of black people to public schools and colleges, but it was rejected as "not a proper subject for discussion". When she introduced another resolution calling for males and females to be educated together at all levels, including colleges, it was fiercely opposed and decisively rejected. One opponent called the idea "a vast social evil... the first step in the school which seeks to abolish marriage, and behind this picture I see a monster of social deformity."

Anthony continued to speak at state teachers' conventions for several years, insisting that women teachers should receive equal pay with men and serve as officers and committee members within the organization.

==== Early women's rights activities ====
Anthony's work for the women's rights movement began at a time when that movement was already gathering momentum. Stanton had helped organize the Seneca Falls Convention in 1848, a local event that was the first women's rights convention. In 1850, the first in a series of National Women's Rights Conventions was held in Worcester, Massachusetts. In 1852, Anthony attended her first National Women's Rights Convention, which was held in Syracuse, New York, where she served as one of the convention's secretaries. According to Ida Husted Harper, Anthony's authorized biographer, "Miss Anthony came away from the Syracuse convention thoroughly convinced that the right which woman needed above every other, the one indeed which would secure to her all others, was the right of suffrage." Suffrage, however, did not become the main focus of her work for several more years.

A major hindrance to the women's movement was a lack of money. Few women at that time had an independent source of income, and even those with employment generally were required by law to turn over their pay to their husbands. Partly through the efforts of the women's movement, a law had been passed in New York in 1848 that recognized some rights for married women, but that law was limited. In 1853, Anthony worked with William Henry Channing, her activist Unitarian minister, to organize a convention in Rochester to launch a state campaign for improved property rights for married women, which Anthony would lead. She took her lecture and petition campaign into almost every county in New York during the winter of 1855 despite the difficulty of traveling in snowy terrain in horse and buggy days.

When she presented the petitions to the New York State Senate Judiciary Committee, its members told her that men were actually the oppressed sex because they did such things as giving women the best seats in carriages. Noting cases in which the petition had been signed by both husbands and wives (instead of the husband signing for both, which was the standard procedure), the committee's official report sarcastically recommended that the petitioners seek a law authorizing the husbands in such marriages to wear petticoats and the wives trousers. The campaign finally achieved success in 1860 when the legislature passed an improved Married Women's Property Act that gave married women the right to own separate property, enter into contracts and be the joint guardian of their children. The legislature rolled back much of this law in 1862, however, during a period when the women's movement was largely inactive because of the American Civil War.

The women's movement was loosely structured at that time, with few state organizations and no national organization other than a coordinating committee that arranged annual conventions. Lucy Stone, who did much of the organizational work for the national conventions, encouraged Anthony to take over some of the responsibility for them. Anthony resisted at first, feeling that she was needed more in the field of anti-slavery activities. After organizing a series of anti-slavery meetings in the winter of 1857, Anthony told a friend that, "the experience of the last winter is worth more to me than all my temperance and woman's rights work, though the latter were the school necessary to bring me into the antislavery work." During a planning session for the 1858 women's rights convention, Stone, who had recently given birth, told Anthony that her new family responsibilities would prevent her from organizing conventions until her children were older. Anthony presided at the 1858 convention, and when the planning committee for national conventions was reorganized, Stanton became its president and Anthony its secretary. Anthony continued to be heavily involved in anti-slavery work at the same time.

==== Anti-slavery activities ====
In 1837, at age 16, Anthony collected petitions against slavery as part of organized resistance to the newly established gag rule that prohibited anti-slavery petitions in the U.S. House of Representatives. In 1851, she played a key role in organizing an anti-slavery convention in Rochester. She was also part of the Underground Railroad. An entry in her diary in 1861 read, "Fitted out a fugitive slave for Canada with the help of Harriet Tubman."

In 1856, Anthony agreed to become the New York State agent for the American Anti-Slavery Society with the understanding that she would also continue her advocacy of women's rights. Anthony organized anti-slavery meetings throughout the state under banners that read "No compromise with slaveholders. Immediate and Unconditional Emancipation."

In 1859, John Brown was executed for leading a violent raid on the U.S. arsenal at Harper's Ferry in what was intended to be the beginning of an armed slave uprising. Anthony organized and presided over a meeting of "mourning and indignation" in Rochester's Corinthian Hall on the day of his execution to raise money for Brown's family.

She developed a reputation for fearlessness in facing down attempts to disrupt her meetings, but opposition became overwhelming on the eve of the Civil War. Mob action shut down her meetings in every town from Buffalo to Albany in early 1861. In Rochester, the police had to escort Anthony and other speakers from the building for their own safety. In Syracuse, according to a local newspaper, "Rotten eggs were thrown, benches broken, and knives and pistols gleamed in every direction."

Anthony expressed a vision of a racially integrated society that was radical for a time when abolitionists were debating the question of what was to become of the slaves after they were freed, and when people like Abraham Lincoln were calling for African Americans to be shipped to newly established colonies in Africa. In a speech in 1861, Anthony said, "Let us open to the colored man all our schools ... Let us admit him into all our mechanic shops, stores, offices, and lucrative business avocations ... let him rent such pew in the church, and occupy such seat in the theatre ... Extend to him all the rights of Citizenship."

The relatively small women's rights movement of that time was closely associated with the American Anti-Slavery Society led by William Lloyd Garrison. The women's movement depended heavily on abolitionist resources, with its articles published in their newspapers and some of its funding provided by abolitionists. There was tension, however, between leaders of the women's movement and male abolitionists who, although supporters of increased women's rights, believed that a vigorous campaign for women's rights would interfere with the campaign against slavery. In 1860, when Anthony sheltered a woman who had fled an abusive husband, Garrison insisted that the woman give up the child she had brought with her, pointing out that the law gave husbands complete control of children. Anthony reminded Garrison that he helped slaves escape to Canada in violation of the law and said, "Well, the law which gives the father ownership of the children is just as wicked and I'll break it just as quickly."

When Stanton introduced a resolution at the National Woman's Rights Convention in 1860 favoring more lenient divorce laws, leading abolitionist Wendell Phillips not only opposed it but attempted to have it removed from the record. When Stanton, Anthony, and others supported a bill before the New York legislature that would permit divorce in cases of desertion or inhuman treatment, Horace Greeley, an abolitionist newspaper publisher, campaigned against it in the pages of his newspaper.

Garrison, Phillips and Greeley had all provided valuable help to the women's movement. In a letter to Lucy Stone, Anthony said, "The Men, even the best of them, seem to think the Women's Rights question should be waived for the present. So let us do our own work, and in our own way."

On February 13, 1928, Representative Charles Hillyer Brand gave a "brief statement of the life and activities" of Anthony—partly titled "militant suffragist"—in which he noted that in 1861, Anthony was "persuaded to give up preparations for the annual women's rights convention to concentrate on work to win the war, though she was not misled by the sophistry that the rights of women would be recognized after the war if they helped to end it."

=== Women's Loyal National League ===
Anthony and Stanton organized the Women's Loyal National League in 1863 to campaign for an amendment to the U.S. Constitution that would abolish slavery. It was the first national women's political organization in the United States. In the largest petition drive in the nation's history up to that time, the League collected nearly 400,000 signatures to abolish slavery, representing approximately one out of every twenty-four adults in the Northern states. The petition drive significantly assisted the passage of the Thirteenth Amendment, which ended slavery. Anthony was the chief organizer of this effort, which involved recruiting and coordinating some 2000 petition collectors.

The League provided the women's movement with a vehicle for combining the fight against slavery with the fight for women's rights by reminding the public that petitioning was the only political tool available to women at a time when only men were allowed to vote. With a membership of 5000, it helped develop a new generation of women leaders, providing experience and recognition for not only Stanton and Anthony but also newcomers like Anna Dickinson, a gifted teenaged orator. The League demonstrated the value of formal structure to a women's movement that had resisted being anything other than loosely organized up to that point. The widespread network of women activists who assisted the League expanded the pool of talent that was available to reform movements, including the women's suffrage movement, after the war.

=== American Equal Rights Association ===
Anthony stayed with her brother Daniel in Kansas for eight months in 1865 to assist with his newspaper. She headed back east after she learned that an amendment to the U.S. Constitution had been proposed that would provide citizenship for African Americans but would also for the first time introduce the word "male" into the constitution. Anthony supported citizenship for blacks but opposed any attempt to link it with a reduction in the status of women. Her ally Stanton agreed, saying "if that word 'male' be inserted, it will take us a century at least to get it out."

Anthony and Stanton worked to revive the women's rights movement, which had become nearly dormant during the American Civil War. In 1866, they organized the Eleventh National Women's Rights Convention, the first since the Civil War began. Unanimously adopting a resolution introduced by Anthony, the convention voted to transform itself into the American Equal Rights Association (AERA), whose purpose was to campaign for the equal rights of all citizens, especially the right of suffrage. The leadership of the new organization included such prominent activists as Lucretia Mott, Lucy Stone, and Frederick Douglass.

The AERA's drive for universal suffrage was resisted by some abolitionist leaders and their allies in the Republican Party. During the period before the 1867 convention to revise the New York state constitution, Horace Greeley, a prominent newspaper editor, told Anthony and Stanton, "This is a critical period for the Republican Party and the life of our Nation... I conjure you to remember that this is 'the negro's hour,' and your first duty now is to go through the State and plead his claims." Abolitionist leaders Wendell Phillips and Theodore Tilton met with Anthony and Stanton in the office of the National Anti-Slavery Standard, a leading abolitionist newspaper. The two men tried to convince the two women that the time had not yet come for women's suffrage, that they should campaign not for voting rights for both women and African Americans in the revised state constitution but for voting rights for black men only. According to Ida Husted Harper, Anthony's authorized biographer, Anthony "was highly indignant and declared that she would sooner cut off her right hand than ask the ballot for the black man and not for woman." Anthony and Stanton continued to work for the inclusion of suffrage for both African Americans and women.

In 1867, the AERA campaigned in Kansas for referendums that would enfranchise both African Americans and women. Wendell Phillips, who opposed mixing those two causes, blocked the funding that the AERA had expected for their campaign. After an internal struggle, Kansas Republicans decided to support suffrage for black men only and formed an "Anti Female Suffrage Committee" to oppose the AERA's efforts. By the end of summer, the AERA campaign had almost collapsed, and its finances were exhausted. Anthony and Stanton created a storm of controversy by accepting help during the last days of the campaign from George Francis Train, a wealthy businessman who supported women's rights. Train antagonized many activists by attacking the Republican Party and openly disparaging the integrity and intelligence of African Americans. There is reason to believe, however, that Anthony and Stanton hoped to draw the volatile Train away from his cruder forms of racism, and that he had actually begun to do so.

After the Kansas campaign, the AERA increasingly divided into two wings, both advocating universal suffrage but with different approaches. One wing, whose leading figure was Lucy Stone, was willing for black men to achieve suffrage first and wanted to maintain close ties with the Republican Party and the abolitionist movement. The other, whose leading figures were Anthony and Stanton, insisted that women and black men should be enfranchised at the same time and worked toward a politically independent women's movement that would no longer be dependent on abolitionists. The AERA effectively dissolved after an acrimonious meeting in May 1869, and two competing woman suffrage organizations were created in its aftermath.

=== The Revolution ===
Anthony and Stanton began publishing a weekly newspaper called The Revolution in New York City in 1868. It focused primarily on women's rights, especially suffrage for women, but it also covered other topics, including politics, the labor movement and finance. Its motto was "Men, their rights and nothing more: women, their rights and nothing less."

One of its goals was to provide a forum in which women could exchange opinions on key issues from a variety of viewpoints. Anthony managed the business aspects of the paper while Stanton was co-editor along with Parker Pillsbury, an abolitionist and a supporter of women's rights. Initial funding was provided by George Francis Train, the controversial businessman who supported women's rights but who alienated many activists with his political and racial views.

In the aftermath of the Civil War, major periodicals associated with the radical social reform movements had either become more conservative or had quit publishing or soon would. Anthony intended for The Revolution to partially fill that void, hoping to grow it eventually into a daily paper with its own printing press, all owned and operated by women. The funding Train had arranged for the newspaper, however, was less than Anthony had expected. Moreover, Train sailed for England after The Revolution published its first issue and was soon jailed for supporting Irish independence.

Train's financial support eventually disappeared entirely. After twenty-nine months, mounting debts forced Anthony to transfer the paper to Laura Curtis Bullard, a wealthy women's rights activist who gave it a less radical tone. The paper published its last issue less than two years later.

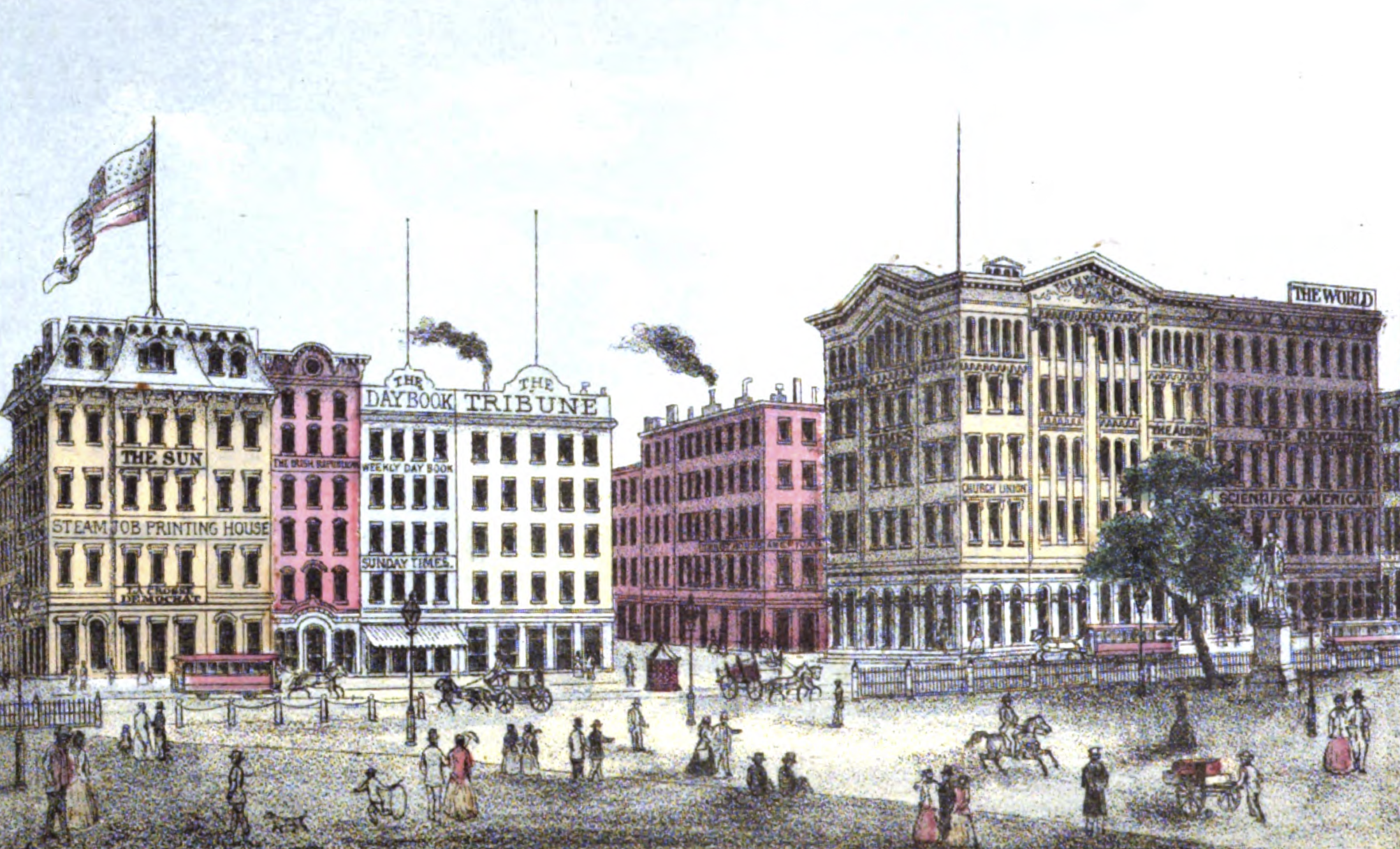
Printing House Square in Manhattan in 1868, showing the sign for The Revolution's office at the far right below The World and above Scientific American

Despite its short life, The Revolution gave Anthony and Stanton a means for expressing their views during the developing split within the women's movement. It also helped them promote their wing of the movement, which eventually became a separate organization.

=== Attempted alliance with labor ===
The National Labor Union (NLU), which was formed in 1866, began reaching out to farmers, African Americans and women, with the intention of forming a broad-based political party. The Revolution responded enthusiastically, declaring, "The principles of the National Labor Union are our principles." It predicted that "The producers—the working-men, the women, the negroes—are destined to form a triple power that shall speedily wrest the sceptre of government from the non-producers—the land monopolists, the bond-holders, the politicians." Anthony and Stanton were seated as delegates to the NLU Congress in 1868, with Anthony representing the Working Women's Association (WWA), which had recently been formed in the offices of The Revolution.

The attempted alliance did not last long. During a printers' strike in 1869, Anthony voiced approval of an employer-sponsored training program that would teach women skills that would enable them in effect to replace the strikers. Anthony viewed the program as an opportunity to increase employment of women in a trade from which women were often excluded by both employers and unions. At the next NLU Congress, Anthony was first seated as a delegate but then unseated because of strong opposition from those who accused her of supporting strikebreakers.

Anthony worked with the WWA to form all-female labor unions, but with little success. She accomplished more in her work with the joint campaign by the WWA and The Revolution to win a pardon for Hester Vaughn, a domestic worker who had been found guilty of infanticide and sentenced to death. Charging that the social and legal systems treated women unfairly, the WWA petitioned, organized a mass meeting at which Anthony was one of the speakers, and sent delegations to visit Vaughn in prison and to speak with the governor. Vaughn was eventually pardoned.

Originally with a membership that included over a hundred wage-earning women, the WWA evolved into an organization consisting almost entirely of journalists, doctors and other middle-class working women. Its members formed the core of the New York City portion of the new national suffrage organization that Anthony and Stanton were in the process of forming.

=== Split in the women's movement ===
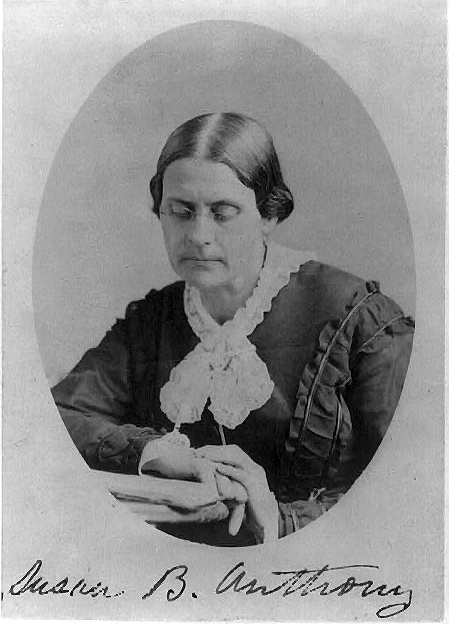
Anthony in 1870

In May 1869, two days after the final AERA convention, Anthony, Stanton and others formed the National Woman Suffrage Association (NWSA). In November 1869, Lucy Stone, Julia Ward Howe and others formed the competing American Woman Suffrage Association (AWSA). The hostile nature of their rivalry created a partisan atmosphere that endured for decades, affecting even professional historians of the women's movement.

The immediate cause for the split was the proposed Fifteenth Amendment to the U.S. Constitution, which would prohibit the denial of suffrage because of race. In one of her most controversial actions, Anthony campaigned against the amendment. She and Stanton called for women and African Americans to be enfranchised at the same time. They said that by effectively enfranchising all men while excluding all women, the amendment would create an "aristocracy of sex" by giving constitutional authority to the idea that men were superior to women. In 1873, Anthony said, "An oligarchy of wealth, where the rich govern the poor; an oligarchy of learning, where the educated govern the ignorant; or even an oligarchy of race, where the Saxon rules the African, might be endured; but surely this oligarchy of sex, which makes the men of every household sovereigns, masters; the women subjects, slaves; carrying dissension, rebellion into every home of the Nation, cannot be endured."

The AWSA supported the amendment, but Lucy Stone, who became its most prominent leader, also made it clear that she believed that suffrage for women would be more beneficial to the country than suffrage for black men.

The two organizations had other differences as well. The NWSA was politically independent, but the AWSA at least initially aimed for close ties with the Republican Party, hoping that the ratification of the Fifteenth Amendment would lead to a Republican push for women's suffrage. The NWSA focused primarily on winning suffrage at the national level while the AWSA pursued a state-by-state strategy. The NWSA initially worked on a wider range of women's issues than the AWSA, including divorce reform and equal pay for women.

Events soon removed much of the basis for the split in the women's movement. In 1870, debate about the Fifteenth Amendment was made irrelevant when that amendment was officially ratified. In 1872, disgust with corruption in government led to a mass defection of abolitionists and other social reformers from the Republicans to the short-lived Liberal Republican Party. As early as 1875, Anthony began urging the NWSA to focus more exclusively on women's suffrage rather than a variety of women's issues. The rivalry between the two women's groups was so bitter, however, that a merger proved to be impossible for twenty years. The AWSA, which was especially strong in New England, was the larger of the two organizations, but it began to decline in strength during the 1880s. In 1890, the two organizations merged as the National American Woman Suffrage Association (NAWSA), with Stanton as president but with Anthony as its effective leader. When Stanton retired from her post in 1892, Anthony became NAWSA's president.

=== National suffrage movement ===
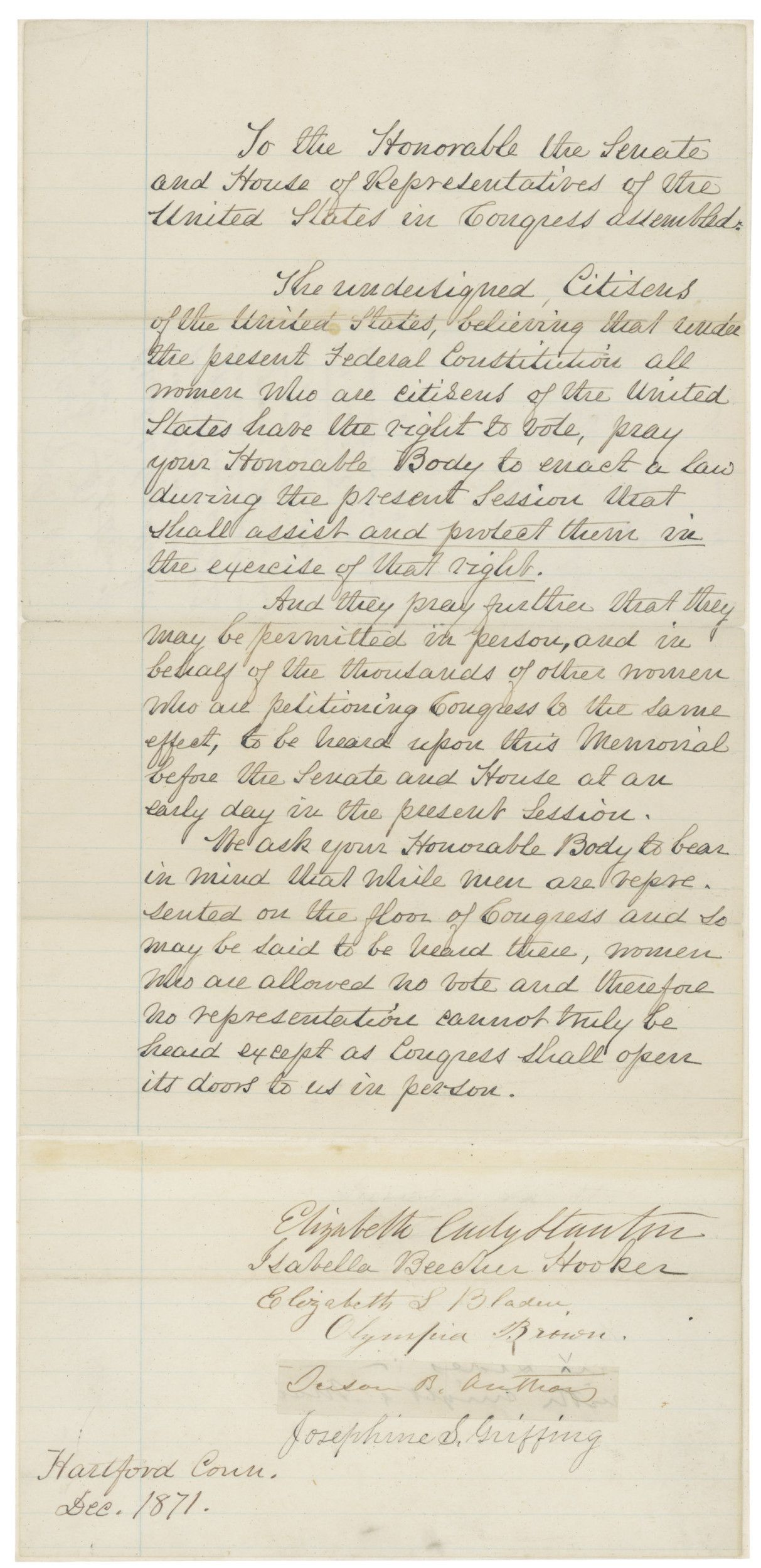
Letter by Anthony to US Congress in favor of Women's Suffrage

"By the end of the Civil War," according to historian Ann D. Gordon, "Susan B. Anthony occupied new social and political territory. She was emerging on the national scene as a female leader, something new in American history, and she did so as a single woman in a culture that perceived the spinster as anomalous and unguarded ... By the 1880s, she was among the senior political figures in the United States."

After the formation of the NWSA, Anthony dedicated herself fully to the organization and to women's suffrage. She did not draw a salary from either it or its successor, the NAWSA, but on the contrary used her lecture fees to fund those organizations. There was no national office, the mailing address being simply that of one of the officers.

That Anthony had remained unmarried gave her an important business advantage in this work. A married woman at that time had the legal status of feme covert, which, among other things, excluded her from signing contracts (her husband could do that for her, if he chose). As Anthony had no husband, she was a feme sole and could freely sign contracts for convention halls, printed materials, etc. Using fees she earned by lecturing, she paid off the debts she had accumulated while supporting The Revolution. With the press treating her as a celebrity, she proved to be a major draw. Over her career she estimated that she averaged 75 to 100 speeches per year. Travel conditions in the earlier days were sometimes appalling. Once she gave a speech from the top of a billiard table. On another occasion her train was snowbound for days, and she survived on crackers and dried fish.

Both Anthony and Stanton joined the lecture circuit about 1870, usually traveling from mid-autumn to spring. The timing was right because the nation was beginning to discuss women's suffrage as a serious matter. Occasionally they traveled together but most often not. Lecture bureaus scheduled their tours and handled the travel arrangements, which generally involved traveling during the day and speaking at night, sometimes for weeks at a time, including weekends. Their lectures brought new recruits into the movement who strengthened suffrage organizations at the local, state and national levels. Their journeys during that decade covered a distance that was unmatched by any other reformer or politician. Anthony's other suffrage work included organizing national conventions, lobbying Congress and state legislatures, and participating in a seemingly endless series of state suffrage campaigns.

A special opportunity arose in 1876 when the U.S. celebrated its 100th birthday as an independent country. The NWSA asked permission to present a Declaration of Rights for Women at the official ceremony in Philadelphia, but was refused. Undaunted, five women, headed by Anthony, walked onto the platform during the ceremony and handed their Declaration to the startled official in charge. As they left, they handed out copies of it to the crowd. Spotting an unoccupied bandstand outside the hall, Anthony mounted it and read the Declaration to a large crowd. Afterwards she invited everyone to a NWSA convention at the nearby Unitarian church where speakers like Lucretia Mott and Elizabeth Cady Stanton awaited them.

The work of all segments of the women's suffrage movement began to show clear results. Women won the right to vote in Wyoming in 1869 and in Utah in 1870. Her lectures in Washington and four other states led directly to invitations for her to address the state legislatures there.

The Grange, a large advocacy group for farmers, officially supported women's suffrage as early as 1885. The Women's Christian Temperance Union, the largest women's organization in the country, also supported suffrage.

Anthony's commitment to the movement, her spartan lifestyle, and the fact that she did not seek personal financial gain, made her an effective fund-raiser and won her the admiration of many who did not agree with her goals. As her reputation grew, her working and travel conditions improved. She sometimes had the use of the private railroad car of Jane Stanford, a sympathizer whose husband owned a major railroad. While lobbying and preparing for the annual suffrage conventions in Washington, she was provided with a free suite of rooms in the Riggs Hotel, whose owners supported her work.

To ensure continuity, Anthony trained a group of younger activists, who were known as her "nieces," to assume leadership roles within the organization. Two of them, Carrie Chapman Catt and Anna Howard Shaw, served as presidents of the NAWSA after Anthony retired from that position.

==== United States v. Susan B. Anthony ====
The NWSA convention of 1871 adopted a strategy of urging women to attempt to vote, and then, after being turned away, to file suits in federal courts to challenge laws that prevented women from voting. The legal basis for the challenge would be the recently adopted Fourteenth Amendment, part of which reads: "No State shall make or enforce any law which shall abridge the privileges or immunities of citizens of the United States".

Following the example set by Anthony and her sisters shortly before election day, a total of nearly fifty women in Rochester registered to vote in the presidential election of 1872. On election day, Anthony and fourteen other women from her ward convinced the election inspectors to allow them to cast ballots, but women in other wards were turned back. Anthony was arrested on November 18, 1872, by a U.S. Deputy Marshal and charged with illegally voting. The other women who had voted were also arrested but released pending the outcome of Anthony's trial. Anthony's trial generated a national controversy and became a major step in the transition of the broader women's rights movement into the women's suffrage movement.

Anthony spoke throughout Monroe County, New York, where her trial was to be held and from where the jurors for her trial would be chosen. Her speech was entitled "Is it a Crime for a U.S. Citizen to Vote?" She said, "We no longer petition Legislature or Congress to give us the right to vote. We appeal to women everywhere to exercise their too long neglected 'citizen's right to vote.'" The U.S. Attorney arranged for the trial to be moved to the federal circuit court, which would soon sit in neighboring Ontario County with a jury drawn from that county's inhabitants. Anthony responded by speaking throughout that county also before the trial began.

Responsibility for that federal circuit was in the hands of Justice Ward Hunt, who had recently been appointed to the U.S. Supreme Court. Hunt had never served as a trial judge; originally a politician, he had begun his judicial career by being elected to the New York Court of Appeals.

The trial, United States v. Susan B. Anthony, began on June 17, 1873, and was closely followed by the national press. Following a rule of common law at that time which prevented criminal defendants in federal courts from testifying, Hunt refused to allow Anthony to speak until the verdict had been delivered. On the second day of the trial, after both sides had presented their cases, Justice Hunt delivered his lengthy opinion, which he had put in writing. In the most controversial aspect of the trial, Hunt directed the jury to deliver a guilty verdict.

On the second day of the trial, Hunt asked Anthony if she had anything to say. She responded with "the most famous speech in the history of the agitation for woman suffrage", according to Ann D. Gordon, a historian of the women's movement. Repeatedly ignoring the judge's order to stop talking and sit down, she protested what she called "this high-handed outrage upon my citizen's rights", saying, "you have trampled under foot every vital principle of our government. My natural rights, my civil rights, my political rights, my judicial rights, are all alike ignored." She castigated Justice Hunt for denying her a trial by jury, but said that even if he had allowed the jury to discuss the case, she still would have been denied a trial by a jury of her peers because women were not allowed to be jurors.

On the centennial of the Boston Tea Party

I stand before you tonight a convicted criminal... convicted by a Supreme Court Judge... and sentenced to pay $100 fine and costs. For what? For asserting my right to representation in a government, based upon the one idea of the right of every person governed to participate in that government. This is the result at the close of 100 years of this government, that I, a native born American citizen, am found guilty of neither lunacy nor idiocy, but of a crime—simply because I exercised our right to vote.

— Speech to the Union League Club, N.Y.
December 16, 1873

When Justice Hunt sentenced Anthony to pay a fine of $100 (equivalent to $2,700 in 2025), she responded, "I shall never pay a dollar of your unjust penalty", and she never did. If Hunt had ordered her to be jailed until she paid the fine, Anthony could have taken her case to the Supreme Court. Hunt instead announced he would not order her taken into custody, closing off that legal avenue.

The U.S. Supreme Court in 1875 put an end to the strategy of trying to achieve women's suffrage through the court system when it ruled in Minor v. Happersett that "the Constitution of the United States does not confer the right of suffrage upon anyone". The NWSA decided to pursue the far more difficult strategy of campaigning for a constitutional amendment to achieve voting rights for women.

==== History of Woman Suffrage ====
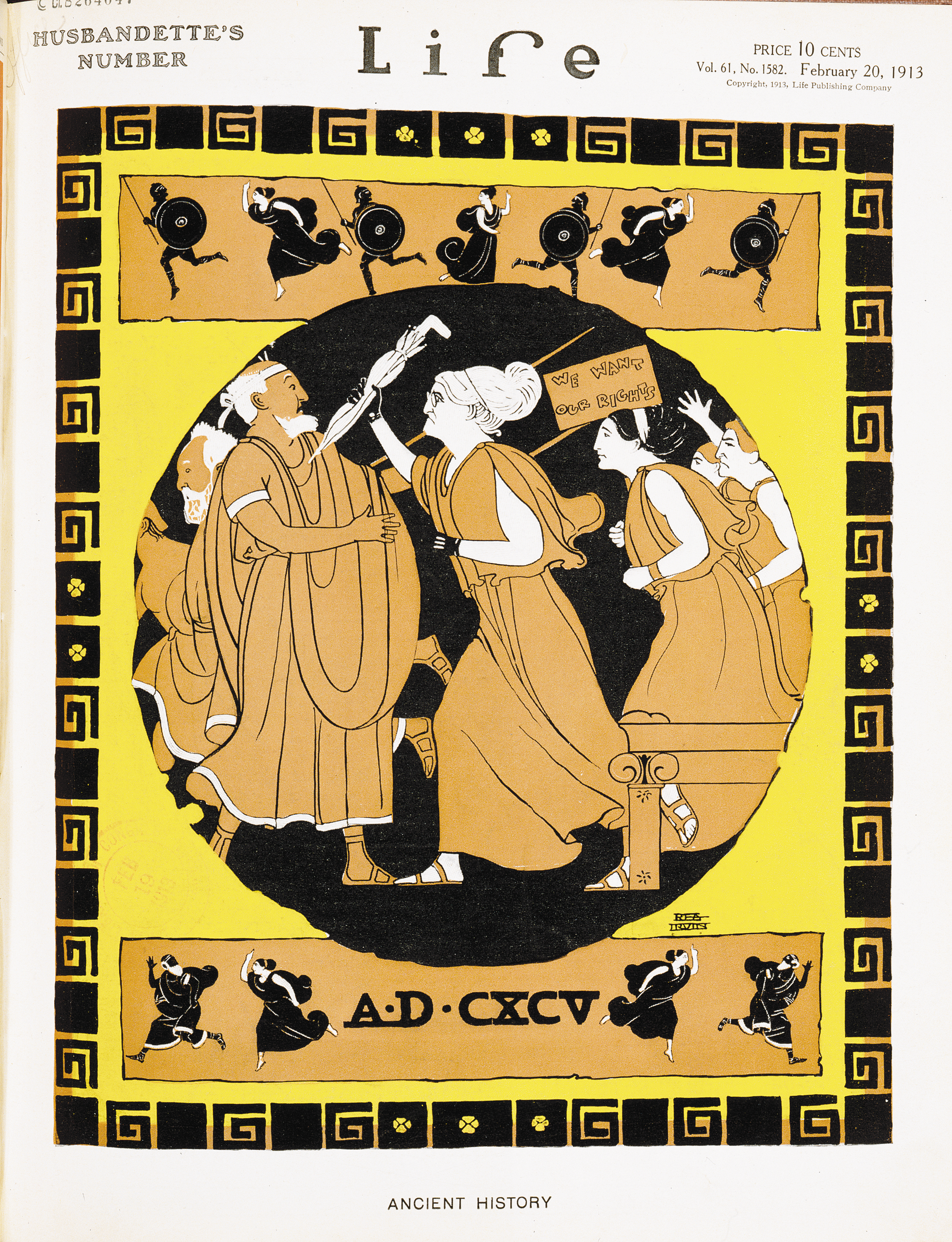
Cover of Life magazine in 1913. Titled "Ancient History", it shows an Anthony-like figure in classical dress leading a protest for women's rights.

Anthony and Stanton initiated the project of writing a history of the women's suffrage movement in 1876. Anthony had for years saved letters, newspaper clippings, and other materials of historical value to the women's movement. In 1876, she moved into the Stanton household in New Jersey along with several trunks and boxes of these materials to begin working with Stanton on the History of Woman Suffrage.

Anthony hated this type of work. In her letters, she said the project "makes me feel growly all the time ... No warhorse ever panted for the rush of battle more than I for outside work. I love to make history but hate to write it." The work absorbed much of her time for several years although she continued to work on other women's suffrage activities. She acted as her own publisher, which presented several problems, including finding space for the inventory. She was forced to limit the number of books she was storing in the attic of her sister's house because the weight was threatening to collapse the structure.

Originally envisioned as a modest publication that could be produced quickly, the history evolved into a six-volume work of more than 5700 pages written over a period of 41 years. The first three volumes, which cover the movement up to 1885, were published between 1881 and 1886 and were produced by Stanton, Anthony and Matilda Joslyn Gage. Anthony handled the production details and the extensive correspondence with contributors. Anthony published Volume 4, which covers the period from 1883 to 1900, in 1902, after Stanton's death, with the help of Ida Husted Harper, Anthony's designated biographer. The last two volumes, which bring the history up to 1920, were completed in 1922 by Harper after Anthony's death.

The History of Woman Suffrage preserves an enormous amount of material that might have been lost forever. Written by leaders of one wing of the divided women's movement (Lucy Stone, their main rival, refused to have anything to do with the project), it does not, however, give a balanced view of events where their rivals are concerned. It overstates the role of Anthony and Stanton, and it understates or ignores the roles of Stone and other activists who did not fit into the historical narrative that Anthony and Stanton developed. Because it was for years the main source of documentation about the suffrage movement, historians have had to uncover other sources to provide a more balanced view.

=== International women's organizations ===
==== International Council of Women ====
Anthony traveled to Europe in 1883 for a nine-month stay, linking up with Stanton, who had arrived a few months earlier. Together they visited women's institutions, such as the newly founded Somerville College and Lady Margaret Hall in Oxford. They met with leaders of European women's movements and began the process of creating an international women's organization. The National Woman Suffrage Association (NWSA) agreed to host its founding congress. The preparatory work was handled primarily by Anthony and two of her younger colleagues in the NWSA, Rachel Foster Avery and May Wright Sewall. Delegates from fifty-three women's organizations in nine countries met in Washington in 1888 to form the new association, which was called the International Council of Women (ICW). The delegates represented a wide variety of organizations, including suffrage associations, professional groups, literary clubs, temperance unions, labor leagues and missionary societies. The American Woman Suffrage Association, which had for years been a rival to the NWSA, participated in the congress. Anthony opened the first session of the ICW and presided over most events.

The ICW commanded respect at the highest levels. President Cleveland and his wife sponsored a reception at the White House for delegates to the ICW's founding congress. The ICW's second congress was an integral part of the World's Columbian Exposition held in Chicago in 1893. At its third congress in London in 1899, a reception for the ICW was held at Windsor Castle at the invitation of Queen Victoria. At its fourth congress in Berlin in 1904, Augusta Victoria, the German Empress, received the ICW leaders at her palace. Anthony played a prominent role on all four occasions.

Still active, ICW is associated with the United Nations.

==== World's Congress of Representative Women ====
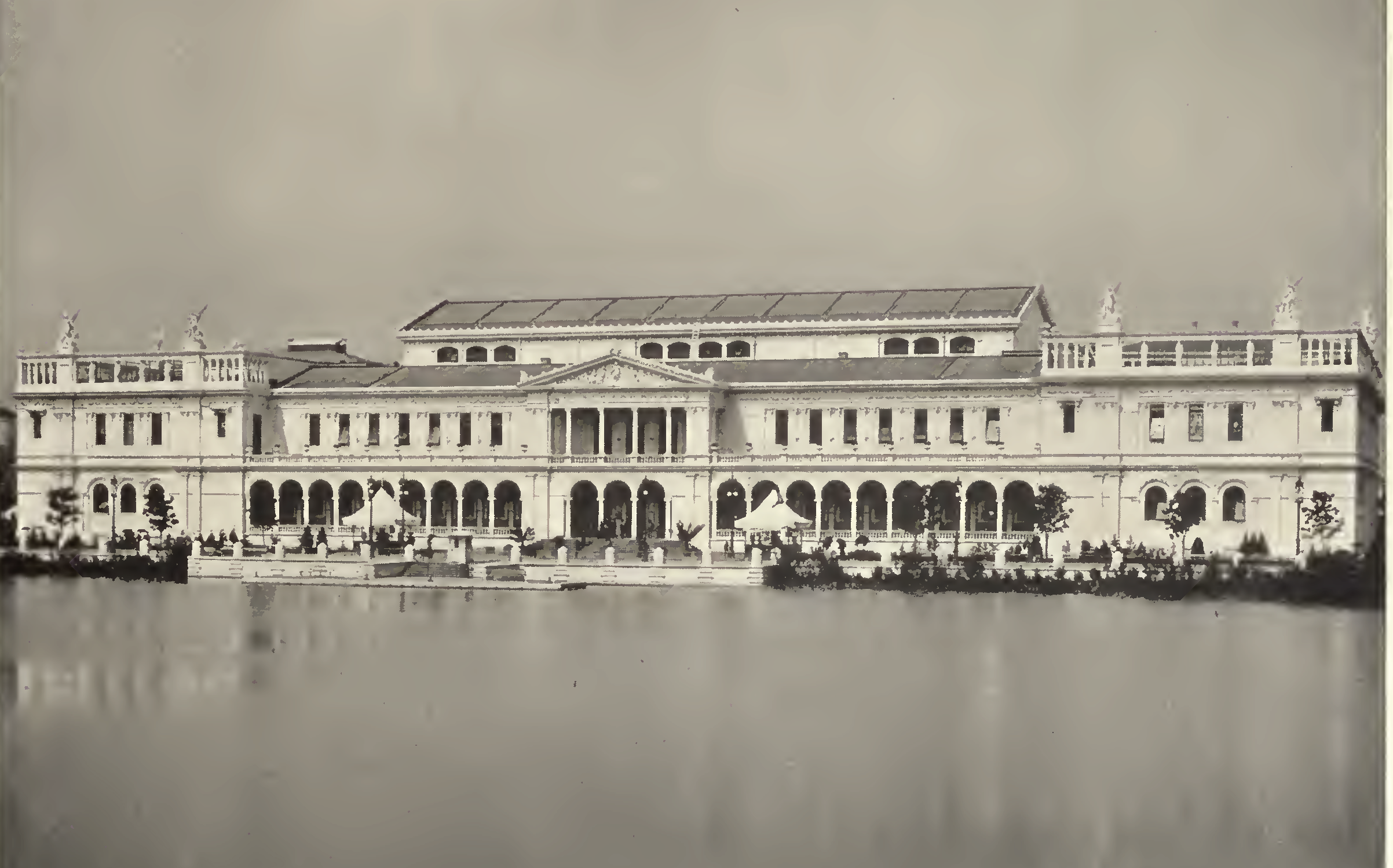
Woman's Building at the World's Columbian Exposition

The World's Columbian Exposition, also known as the Chicago World's Fair, was held in 1893. It hosted several world congresses, each dealing with a specialized topic, such as religion, medicine and science. At almost the last moment, the U.S. Congress decided that the Exposition should also recognize the role of women. After it was over, one of the organizers of the Exposition's congress of women revealed that Anthony had played a pivotal but hidden role in that last-minute decision. Fearing that a public campaign would rouse opposition, Anthony had worked quietly to organize support for this project among women of the political elite. Anthony increased the pressure by covertly initiating a petition that was signed by wives and daughters of Supreme Court judges, senators, cabinet members and other dignitaries.

A large structure called the Woman's Building, designed by Sophia Hayden Bennett, was constructed to provide meeting and exhibition spaces for women at the Exposition. Two of Anthony's closest associates were appointed to organize the women's congress. They arranged for the International Council of Women to make its upcoming meeting part of the Exposition by expanding its scope and calling itself the World's Congress of Representative Women. This week-long congress seated delegates from 27 countries. Its 81 sessions, many held simultaneously, were attended by over 150,000 people, and women's suffrage was discussed at almost every session. Anthony spoke to large crowds at the Exposition.

"Buffalo Bill" Cody invited her as a guest to his Wild West Show, located just outside the Exposition. When the show opened, he rode his horse directly to her and greeted her with dramatic flair. According to a co-worker, Anthony, "for the moment as enthusiastic as a girl, waved her handkerchief at him, while the big audience, catching the spirit of the scene, wildly applauded."

==== International Woman Suffrage Alliance ====
After Anthony retired as president of the National American Woman Suffrage Association, Carrie Chapman Catt, her chosen successor, began working toward an international women's suffrage association, one of Anthony's long-time goals. The existing International Council of Women could not be expected to support a campaign for women's suffrage because it was a broad alliance whose more conservative members would object. In 1902, Catt organized a preparatory meeting in Washington, with Anthony as chair, that was attended by delegates from several countries. Organized primarily by Catt, the International Woman Suffrage Alliance was created in Berlin in 1904. The founding meeting was chaired by Anthony, who was declared to be the new organization's honorary president and first member. According to Anthony's authorized biographer, "no event ever gave Miss Anthony such profound satisfaction as this one".

Later renamed the International Alliance of Women, the organization is still active and is affiliated with the United Nations.

=== Changing relationship with Stanton ===
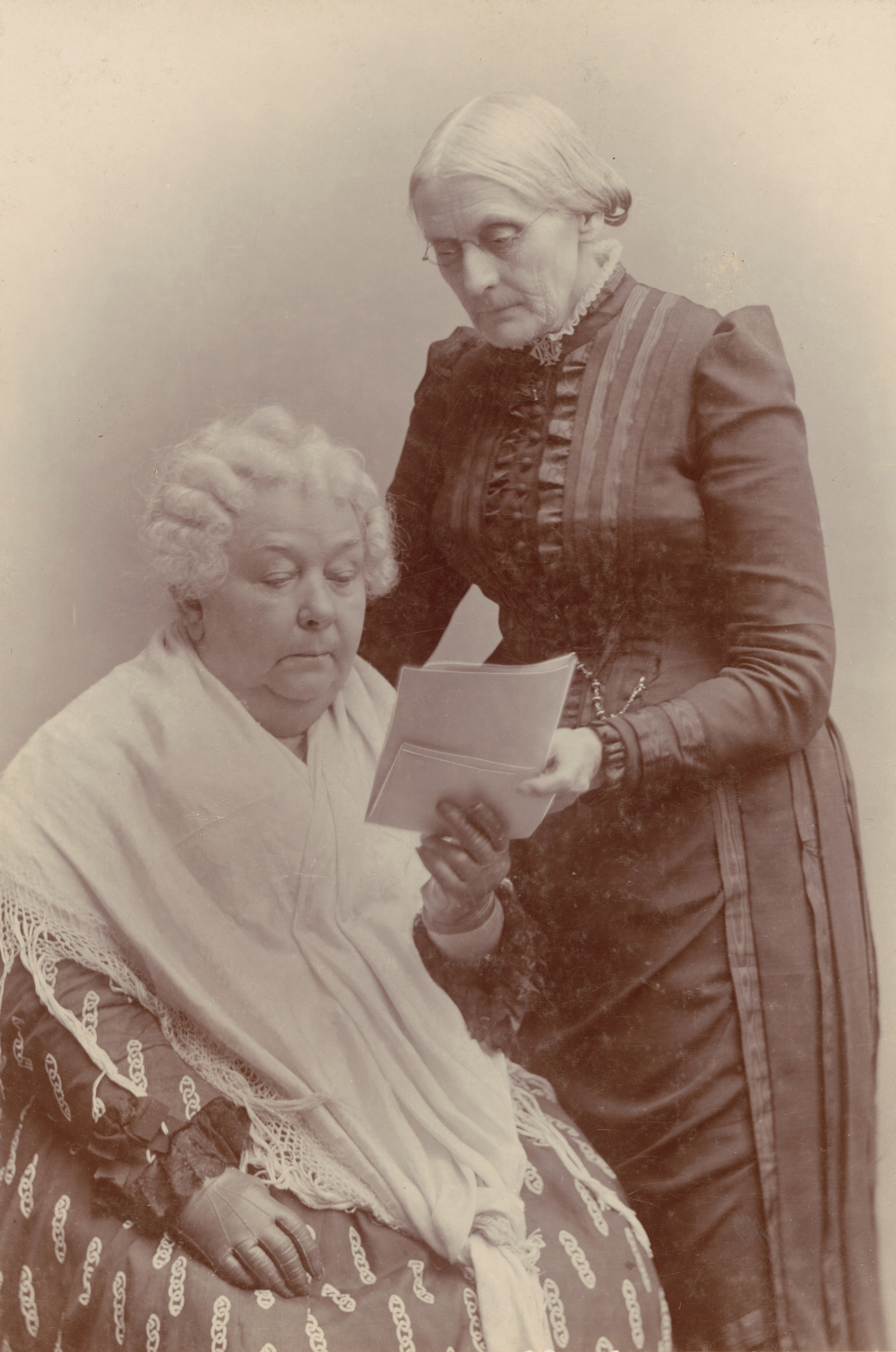
Stanton with Anthony

Anthony and Stanton worked together in a close and productive relationship. From 1880 to 1886, they were together almost every day working on the History of Woman Suffrage. They referred to each other as "Susan" and "Mrs. Stanton". Anthony deferred to Stanton in other ways also, not accepting an office in any organization that would place her above Stanton. In practice this generally meant that Anthony, although ostensibly holding a less important office, handled most of the organization's daily activities. Stanton sometimes felt the weight of Anthony's determination and drive. When Stanton arrived at an important meeting in 1888 with her speech not yet written, Anthony insisted that Stanton stay in her hotel room until she had written it, and she placed a younger colleague outside her door to make sure she did so. At Anthony's 70th birthday celebration, Stanton teased her by saying, "Well, as all women are supposed to be under the thumb of some man, I prefer a tyrant of my own sex, so I shall not deny the patent fact of my subjection."

Their interests began to diverge somewhat as they grew older. As the drive for women's suffrage gained momentum, Anthony began to form alliances with more conservative groups, such as the Women's Christian Temperance Union, the nation's largest women's organization and a supporter of women's suffrage. Such moves irritated Stanton, who said, "I get more radical as I get older, while she seems to grow more conservative." In 1895 Stanton published The Woman's Bible, which attacked the use of the Bible to relegate women to an inferior status. It became a highly controversial best-seller. The NAWSA voted to disavow any connection with it despite Anthony's strong objection that such a move was unnecessary and hurtful. Even so, Anthony refused to assist with the book's preparation, telling Stanton: "You say 'women must be emancipated from their superstitions before enfranchisement will have any benefit,' and I say just the reverse, that women must be enfranchised before they can be emancipated from their superstitions." Despite such friction, their relationship continued to be close. When Stanton died in 1902, Anthony wrote to a friend: "Oh, this awful hush! It seems impossible that voice is stilled which I have loved to hear for fifty years. Always I have felt I must have Mrs. Stanton's opinion of things before I knew where I stood myself. I am all at sea..."

=== Later life ===
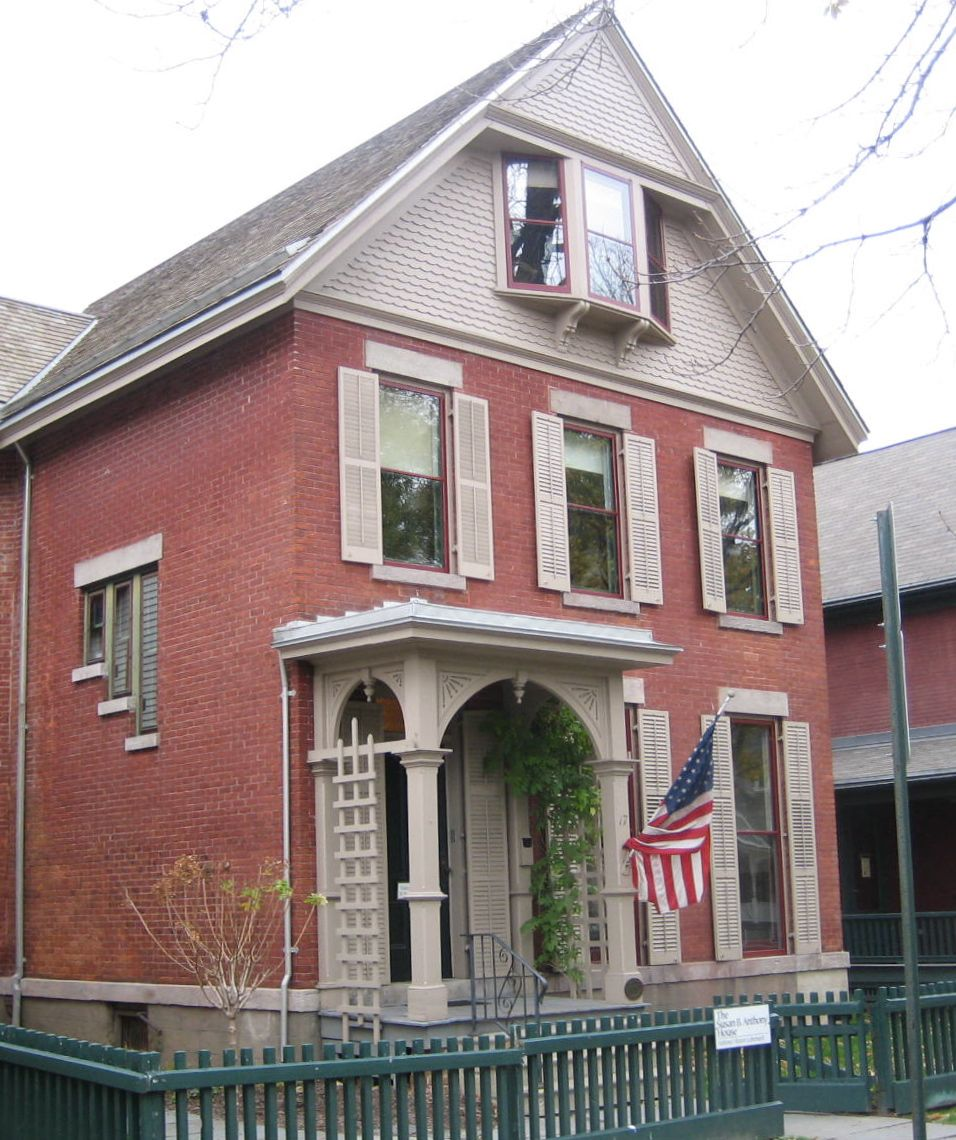
The house that Susan B. Anthony shared with her sister in Rochester. She was arrested here for voting.

Having lived for years in hotels and with friends and relatives, Anthony agreed to settle into her sister Mary Stafford Anthony's house in Rochester in 1891, at the age of 71. Her energy and stamina, which sometimes exhausted her co-workers, continued at a remarkable level. At age 75, she toured Yosemite National Park on the back of a mule.

She remained as leader of the NAWSA and continued to travel extensively on suffrage work. She also engaged in local projects and was a lifelong member of the Daughters of the American Revolution. In 1893, she initiated the Rochester branch of the Women's Educational and Industrial Union. In 1898, she called a meeting of 73 local women's societies to form the Rochester Council of Women. She played a key role in raising the funds required by the University of Rochester before they would admit women students, pledging her life insurance policy to close the final funding gap.

In 1896, she spent eight months on the California suffrage campaign, speaking as many as three times per day in more than 30 localities. In 1900, she presided over her last NAWSA convention. During the six remaining years of her life, Anthony spoke at six more NAWSA conventions and four congressional hearings, completed the fourth volume of the History of Woman Suffrage, and traveled to eighteen states and to Europe. As Anthony's fame grew, some politicians (certainly not all of them) were happy to be publicly associated with her. Her seventieth birthday was celebrated at a national event in Washington with prominent members of the House and Senate in attendance. Her eightieth birthday was celebrated at the White House at the invitation of President William McKinley.

== Death and legacy ==
Susan B. Anthony died at the age of 86 of heart failure and pneumonia in her home in Rochester, New York, on March 13, 1906. She was buried at Mount Hope Cemetery, Rochester. At her birthday celebration in Washington, D.C., a few days earlier, Anthony had spoken of those who had worked with her for women's rights: "There have been others also just as true and devoted to the cause—I wish I could name every one—but with such women consecrating their lives, failure is impossible!" "Failure is impossible" quickly became a watchword for the women's movement.

Anthony did not live to see the achievement of women's suffrage at the national level, but she still expressed pride in the progress the women's movement had made. At the time of her death, women had achieved suffrage in Wyoming, Utah, Colorado and Idaho, and several larger states followed soon after. Legal rights for married women had been established in most states, and most professions had at least a few women members. 36,000 women were attending colleges and universities, up from zero a few decades earlier." Two years before she died, Anthony said, "The world has never witnessed a greater revolution than in the sphere of woman during this fifty years".

Part of the revolution, in Anthony's view, was in ways of thinking. In a speech in 1889, she noted that women had always been taught that their purpose was to serve men, but "Now, after 40 years of agitation, the idea is beginning to prevail that women were created for themselves, for their own happiness, and for the welfare of the world." Anthony was sure that women's suffrage would be achieved, but she also feared that people would forget how difficult it was to achieve it, as they were already forgetting the ordeals of the recent past:

We shall someday be heeded, and when we shall have our amendment to the Constitution of the United States, everybody will think it was always so, just exactly as many young people think that all the privileges, all the freedom, all the enjoyments which woman now possesses always were hers. They have no idea of how every single inch of ground that she stands upon today has been gained by the hard work of some little handful of women of the past.

— Susan B. Anthony, 1894

Anthony's death was widely mourned. Clara Barton, founder of the American Red Cross, said just before Anthony's death, "A few days ago someone said to me that every woman should stand with bared head before Susan B. Anthony. 'Yes,' I answered, 'and every man as well.' ... For ages he has been trying to carry the burden of life's responsibilities alone... Just now it is new and strange and men cannot comprehend what it would mean but the change is not far away."

In her history of the women's suffrage movement, Eleanor Flexner wrote, "If Lucretia Mott typified the moral force of the movement, if Lucy Stone was its most gifted orator and Mrs. Stanton its most outstanding philosopher, Susan Anthony was its incomparable organizer, who gave it force and direction for half a century."

The Nineteenth Amendment, which prohibited the denial of suffrage because of sex, was colloquially known as the Susan B. Anthony Amendment. After it was ratified in 1920, the National American Woman Suffrage Association, whose character and policies were strongly influenced by Anthony, was transformed into the League of Women Voters, which is still an active force in U.S. politics.

On August 18, 2020—the 100th anniversary of the ratification of the Nineteenth Amendment—President Donald Trump announced that he would pardon Anthony, 148 years after her conviction. The president of the National Susan B. Anthony Museum and House wrote to "decline" the offer of a pardon on the principle that, to accept a pardon would wrongly "validate" the trial proceedings in the same manner that paying the $100 fine would have.

Anthony's papers are held in library collections of Harvard University and its Radcliffe Institute, Rutgers University, the Library of Congress, and Smith College. She is the author of a 6 volume work History of Woman Suffrage (1881).

== Views ==
=== Views on religion ===
Anthony was raised a Quaker, but her religious heritage was mixed. On her mother's side, her grandmother was a Baptist and her grandfather was a Universalist. Her father was a radical Quaker who chafed under the restrictions of his more conservative congregation. When the Quakers split in the late 1820s into Orthodox and Hicksites, her family sided with the Hicksites, which Anthony described as "the radical side, the Unitarian".

In 1848, three years after the Anthony family moved to Rochester, a group of about 200 Quakers withdrew from the Hicksite organization in western New York, partly because they wanted to work in social reform movements without interference from that organization. Some of them, including the Anthony family, began attending services at the First Unitarian Church of Rochester. When Susan B. Anthony returned home from teaching in 1849, she joined her family in attending services there, and she remained with the Rochester Unitarians for the rest of her life. Her sense of spirituality was strongly influenced by William Henry Channing, a nationally known minister of that church who also assisted her with several of her reform projects. Anthony was listed as a member of First Unitarian in a church history written in 1881.

Anthony, proud of her Quaker roots, continued to describe herself as a Quaker, however. She maintained her membership in the local Hicksite body but did not attend its meetings. She joined the Congregational Friends, an organization that was created by Quakers in western New York after the 1848 split among Quakers there. This group soon ceased to operate as a religious body, however, and changed its name to the Friends of Human Progress, organizing annual meetings in support of social reform that welcomed everyone, including "Christians, Jews, Mahammedans, and Pagans". Anthony served as secretary of this group in 1857.

In 1859, during a period when Rochester Unitarians were gravely impaired by factionalism, Anthony unsuccessfully attempted to start a "Free church in Rochester ... where no doctrines should be preached and all should be welcome." She used as her model the Boston church of Theodore Parker, a Unitarian minister who helped to set the direction of his denomination by rejecting the authority of the Bible and the validity of miracles. Anthony later became close friends with William Channing Gannett, who became the minister of the Unitarian Church in Rochester in 1889, and with his wife Mary, who came from a Quaker background. William had been a national leader of the successful movement within the Unitarian denomination to end the practice of binding it by a formal creed, thereby opening its membership to non-Christians and even non-theists, a goal for the denomination that resembled Anthony's goal for her proposed Free church.

After Anthony reduced her arduous travel schedule and made her home in Rochester in 1891, she resumed regular attendance at First Unitarian and also worked with the Gannetts on local reform projects. Her sister Mary Stafford Anthony, whose home had provided a resting place for Anthony during her years of frequent travel, had long played an active role in this church.

Her first public speech, delivered at a temperance meeting as a young woman, contained frequent references to God. She soon took a more distant approach, however. While in Europe in 1883, Anthony helped a desperately poor Irish mother of six children. Noting that "the evidences were that 'God' was about to add a No. 7 to her flock", she later commented, "What a dreadful creature their God must be to keep sending hungry mouths while he withholds the bread to fill them!"

Elizabeth Cady Stanton said that Anthony was an agnostic, adding, "To her, work is worship ... Her belief is not orthodox, but it is religious." Anthony herself said, "Work and worship are one with me. I can not imagine a God of the universe made happy by my getting down on my knees and calling him 'great.'" When Anthony's sister Hannah was on her death bed, she asked Susan to talk about the great beyond, but, Anthony later wrote, "I could not dash her faith with my doubts, nor could I pretend a faith I had not; so I was silent in the dread presence of death."

When an organization offered to sponsor a women's rights convention on the condition that "no speaker should say anything which would seem like an attack on Christianity", Anthony wrote to a friend, "I wonder if they'll be as particular to warn all other speakers not to say anything which shall sound like an attack on liberal religion. They never seem to think we have any feelings to be hurt when we have to sit under their reiteration of orthodox cant and dogma."

=== Views on marriage ===
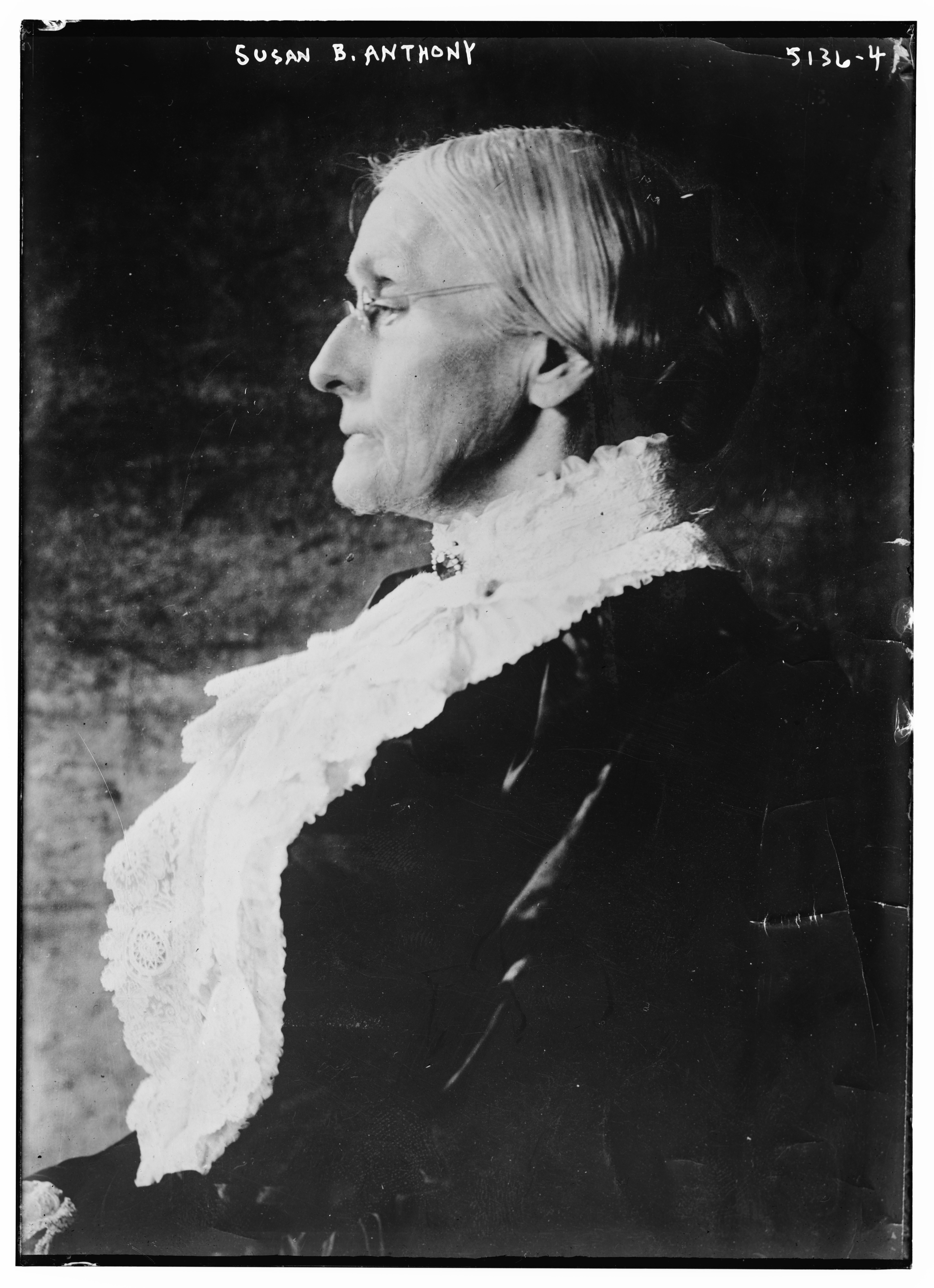
Susan B. Anthony

As a teen, Anthony went to parties, and she had offers of marriage when she was older, but there is no record of her ever having a serious romance. Anthony loved children, however, and helped raise the children in the Stanton household. Referring to her niece, she wrote, "The dear little Lucy engrosses most of my time and thoughts. A child one loves is a constant benediction to the soul, whether or not it helps to the accomplishment of great intellectual feats."

As a young worker in the women's rights movement, Anthony expressed frustration when some of her co-workers began to marry and have children, sharply curtailing their ability to work for the understaffed movement. When Lucy Stone abandoned her pledge to stay single, Anthony's scolding remarks caused a temporary rupture in their friendship. Journalists repeatedly asked Anthony to explain why she never married. She answered one by saying, "It always happened that the men I wanted were those I could not get, and those who wanted me I wouldn't have." To another, she answered, "I never found the man who was necessary to my happiness. I was very well as I was." To a third she said, "I never felt I could give up my life of freedom to become a man's housekeeper. When I was young, if a girl married poor, she became a housekeeper and a drudge. If she married wealth she became a pet and a doll. Just think, had I married at twenty, I would have been a drudge or a doll for fifty-nine years. Think of it!"

Anthony fiercely opposed laws that gave husbands complete control over the marriage. Blackstone's Commentaries, the basis for the legal systems in most states at that time, stated that, "By marriage, the husband and wife are one person in law: that is, the very being or legal existence of the woman is suspended during the marriage".

In a speech in 1877, Anthony predicted "an epoch of single women. If women will not accept marriage with subjugation, nor men proffer it without, there is, there can be, no alternative. The woman who will not be ruled must live without marriage."

=== Views on abortion ===
Anthony showed little interest in the topic of abortion. Ann D. Gordon, who led the Elizabeth Cady Stanton and Susan B. Anthony Papers project, an undertaking to collect and document materials written by those two co-workers, said that Anthony "never voiced an opinion about the sanctity of fetal life ... and she never voiced an opinion about using the power of the state to require that pregnancies be brought to term." Lynn Sherr, author of a biography of Anthony, said that Anthony never stated her views on abortion, saying, "I looked desperately for some kind of evidence one way or the other as to what her position was, and it just wasn't there."

A dispute over Anthony's views on abortion developed after 1989 when some members of the anti-abortion movement began to portray Anthony as "an outspoken critic of abortion", citing various statements they said she had made. The anti-abortion advocacy group Susan B. Anthony List named itself after her on this basis. Gordon, Sherr and others contested this portrayal, saying these statements either were not made by Anthony, were not about abortion, or had been taken out of context.

== Commemoration ==
=== Halls of Fame ===
In 1950, Anthony was inducted into the Hall of Fame for Great Americans. A bust of her that was sculpted by Brenda Putnam was placed there in 1952.

In 1973, Anthony was inducted into the National Women's Hall of Fame.

=== Artwork ===
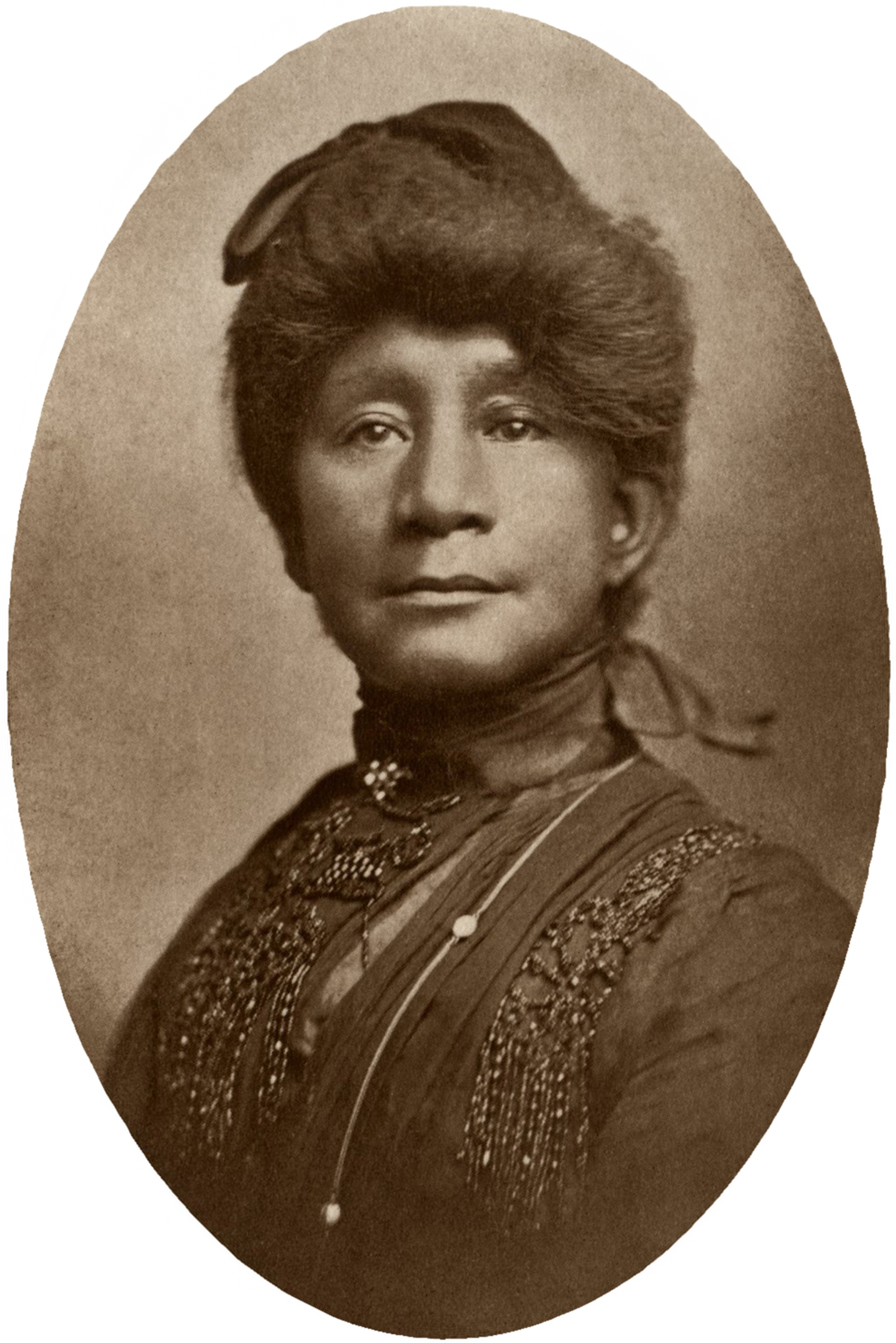
Hester C. Jeffrey, who spoke at Anthony's funeral and arranged the creation of a stained glass window as Anthony's first memorial

The first memorial to Anthony was established by African Americans. In 1907, a year after Anthony's death, a stained-glass window was installed at the African Methodist Episcopal Zion church in Rochester that featured her portrait and the words "Failure is Impossible", a quote from her that had become a watchword for the women's suffrage movement. It was installed through the efforts of Hester C. Jeffrey, the president of the Susan B. Anthony Club, an organization of African American women in Rochester. Speaking at the window's dedication, Jeffrey said, "Miss Anthony had stood by the Negroes when it meant almost death to be a friend of the colored people." This church had a history of involvement in issues of social justice: in 1847, Frederick Douglass printed the first editions of The North Star, his abolitionist newspaper, in its basement.

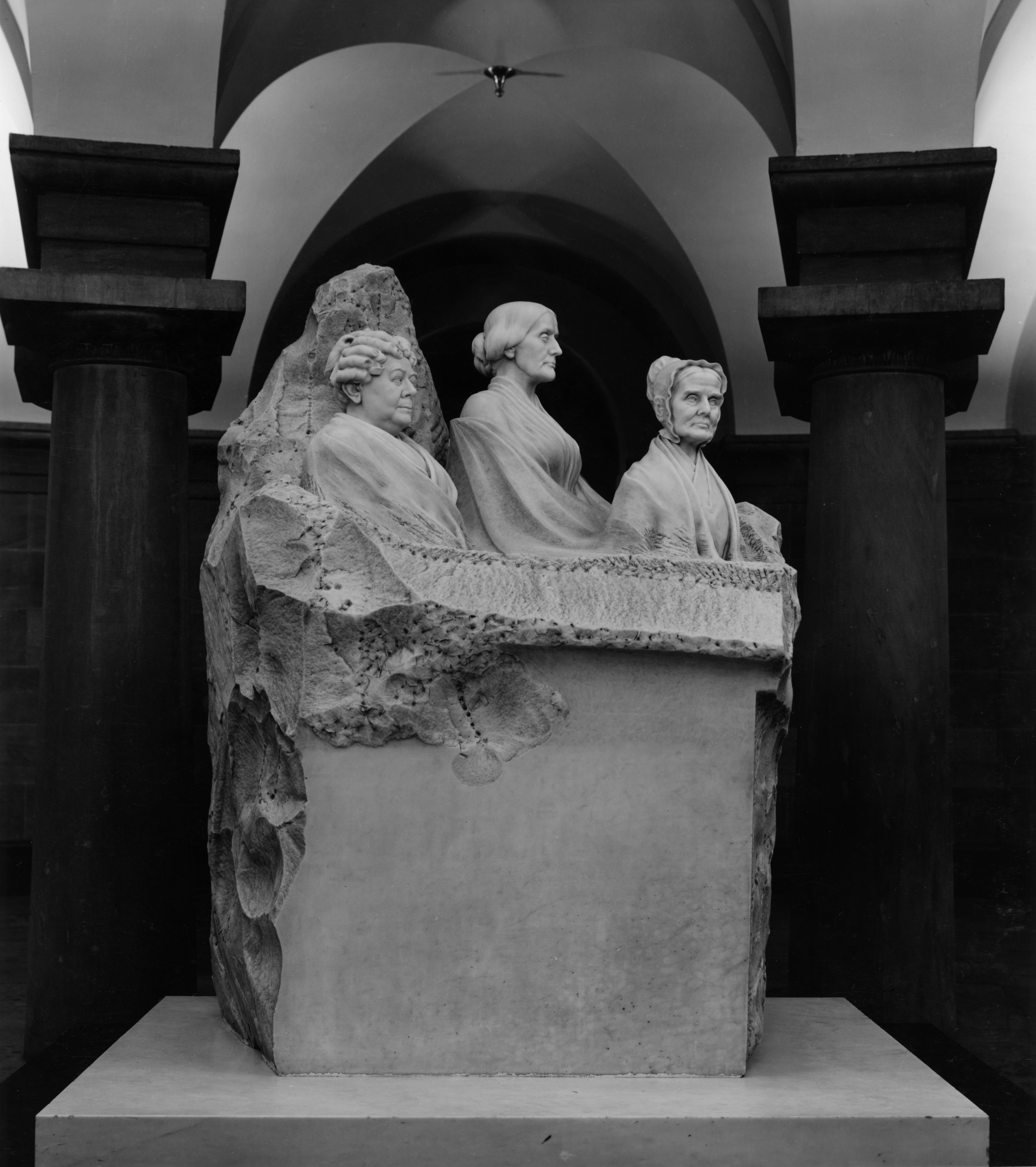
Portrait Monument, a statue of Anthony, Elizabeth Cady Stanton, and Lucretia Mott in the rotunda of the U.S. Capitol Building. Created by Adelaide Johnson in 1920.

Anthony is commemorated along with Elizabeth Cady Stanton and Lucretia Mott in the Portrait Monument sculpture by Adelaide Johnson at the United States Capitol, unveiled in 1921. Originally kept on display in the crypt of the US Capitol, the sculpture was moved to its current location and more prominently displayed in the rotunda in 1997.

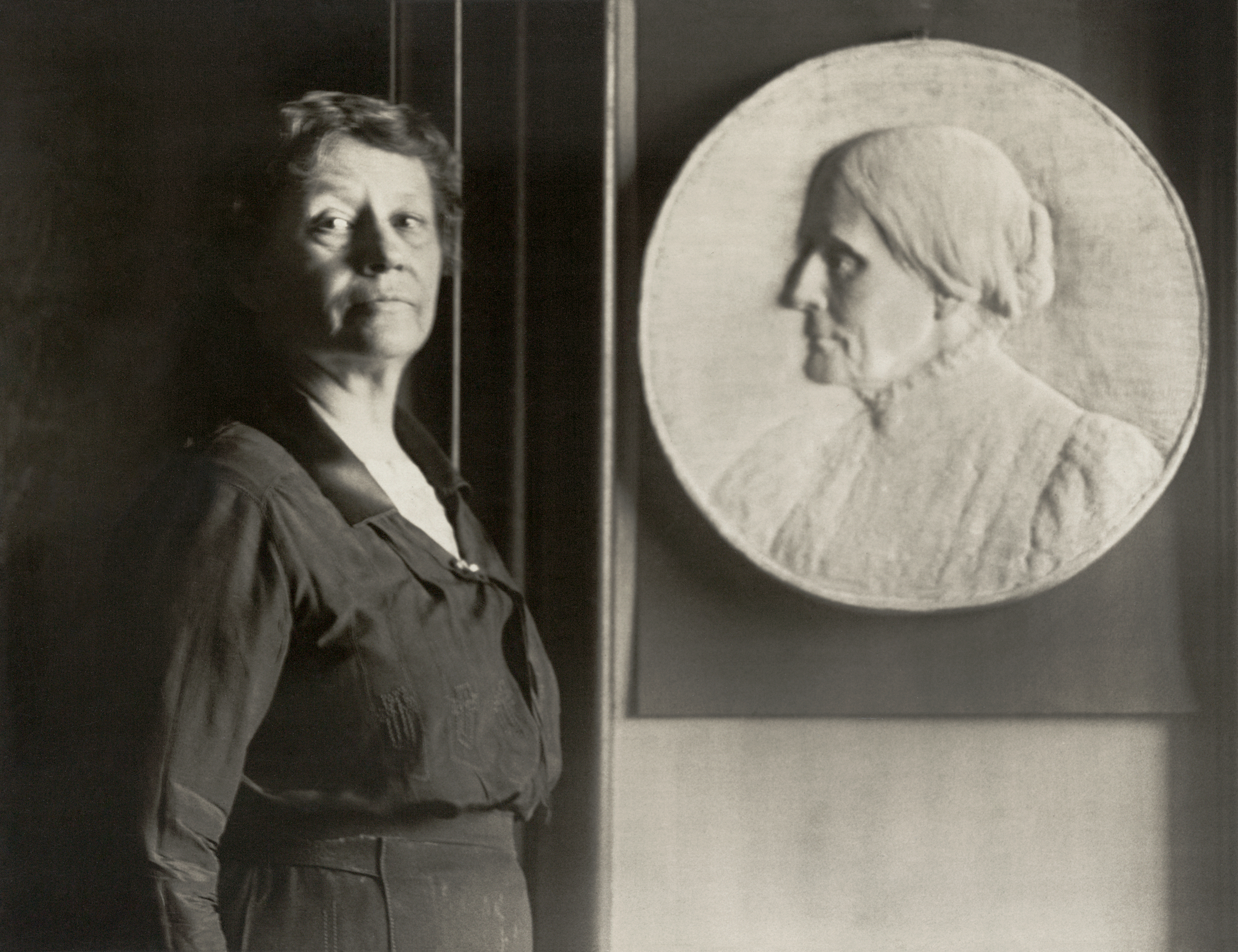
Leila Usher, next to the bas-relief of Susan B. Anthony she donated to the National Woman's Party

In 1922, sculptor Leila Usher donated a bas-relief of Susan B. Anthony to the National Woman's Party, which was installed at their headquarters near Washington, DC. Usher was also responsible for the creation of a similar bronze medallion donated to Bryn Mawr College in 1901.

A sculpture by Ted Aub commemorating the introduction of Anthony to Elizabeth Cady Stanton by Amelia Bloomer on May 12, 1851, was unveiled In 1999. Called "When Anthony Met Stanton", it consists of life-size bronze statues of the three women near Van Cleef Lake in Seneca Falls, New York, where the introduction occurred.

In 2001, the Cathedral of St. John the Divine in Manhattan, one of the world's largest, added a sculpture honoring Anthony and three other heroes of the twentieth century: Martin Luther King Jr., Albert Einstein, and Mahatma Gandhi.

An installation artwork by Judy Chicago called The Dinner Party, first exhibited in 1979, features a place setting for Anthony.

A bronze sculpture of a locked ballot box flanked by two pillars marks the place where Anthony voted in 1872 in defiance of laws that prohibited women from voting. Called the 1872 Monument, it was dedicated in August 2009, on the 89th anniversary of the Nineteenth Amendment. Leading away from the 1872 Monument is the Susan B. Anthony Trail, which runs beside the 1872 Café, named for the year of Anthony's vote.

Near the Susan B. Anthony Museum and House is the "Let's Have Tea" sculpture of Anthony and Frederick Douglass created by Pepsy Kettavong.

On February 15, 2020, Google celebrated Anthony's 200th birthday with a Google Doodle.

=== Landmarks ===
Anthony's home in Rochester is a National Historic Landmark called the National Susan B. Anthony Museum and House. The house of her birth in Adams, Massachusetts, and her childhood home in Battenville, New York, are listed on the National Register of Historic Places.

In 2007, the new Frederick Douglass–Susan B. Anthony Memorial Bridge replaced the old Troup–Howell Bridge as the conveyor of expressway traffic on Interstate 490 through downtown Rochester.

=== Documentary projects ===
The Elizabeth Cady Stanton and Susan B. Anthony Papers project was an academic undertaking to collect and document all available materials written by Elizabeth Cady Stanton and Anthony. The project began in 1982 and has since been ended.

In 1999, Ken Burns and others produced the television documentary Not for Ourselves Alone: The Story of Elizabeth Cady Stanton & Susan B. Anthony.

=== Banknotes, coins and stamps ===
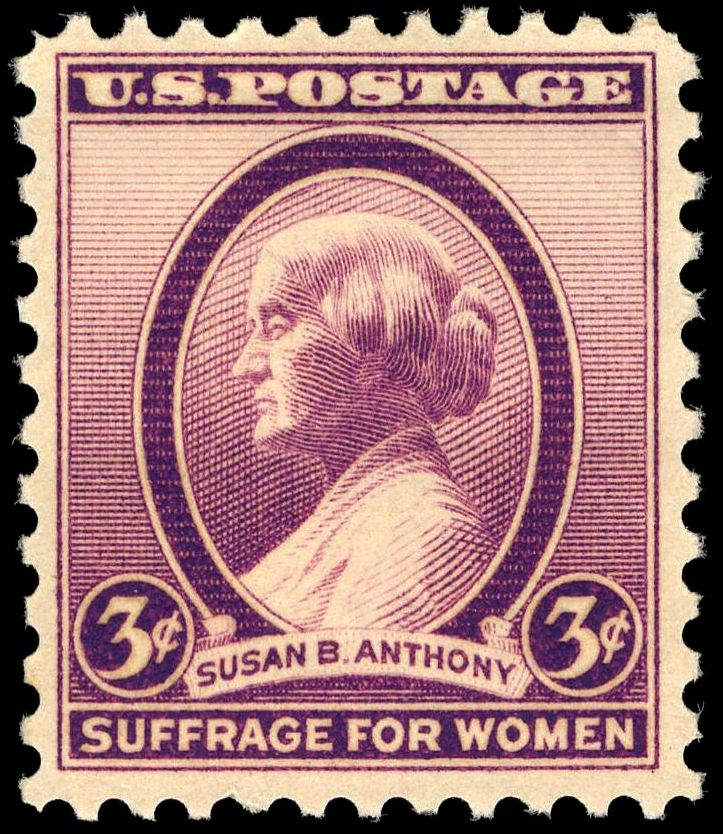
Commemorative stamp of Susan B. Anthony issued in 1936

The US Post Office issued its first postage stamp honoring Anthony in 1936 on the 16th anniversary of the ratification of the 19th Amendment, which ensured women's right to vote. A second stamp honoring Anthony was issued in April 1958.

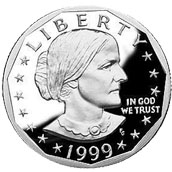
U.S. dollar coin with image of Susan. B. Anthony

In 1979, the United States Mint began issuing the Susan B. Anthony dollar coin, the first US coin to honor a female citizen.

The US Treasury Department announced on April 20, 2016, that an image of Anthony would appear on the back of a newly designed $10 bill along with Lucretia Mott, Sojourner Truth, Elizabeth Cady Stanton and Alice Paul. The original plan was for a woman to appear on the front of the $10 bill, with Anthony under consideration for that position. The final plan, however, calls for Alexander Hamilton, the first US Secretary of the Treasury, to retain his current position there. Designs for new $5, $10 and $20 bills will be unveiled in 2020 in conjunction with the 100th anniversary of American women winning the right to vote via the 19th Amendment.

=== Names of awards and organizations ===
Since 1970, the Susan B. Anthony Award is given annually by the New York City chapter of the National Organization for Women to honor "grassroots activists dedicated to improving the lives of women and girls in New York City."

New York Radical Feminists, founded in 1969, was organized into small cells or "brigades" named after notable feminists of the past. The Stanton-Anthony Brigade was led by Anne Koedt and Shulamith Firestone.

In 1971, Zsuzsanna Budapest founded the Susan B. Anthony Coven #1 – the first feminist, women-only, witches' coven.

The Susan B. Anthony Memorial Unrest Home Womyn's Land Trust (SuBAMUH) was founded in 1979 in Ohio. It eventually allowed people other than only women.

The Susan B. Anthony List is a non-profit organization that seeks to reduce and ultimately end abortion in the U.S.

=== Music ===
The punk rock band The Distillers has a song named "Seneca Falls" in the album Sing Sing Death House (2002) that tells the story of the convention and Susan B. Anthony's part in it. The music is featured in the game Tony Hawk's Pro Skater 4.

=== Other ===
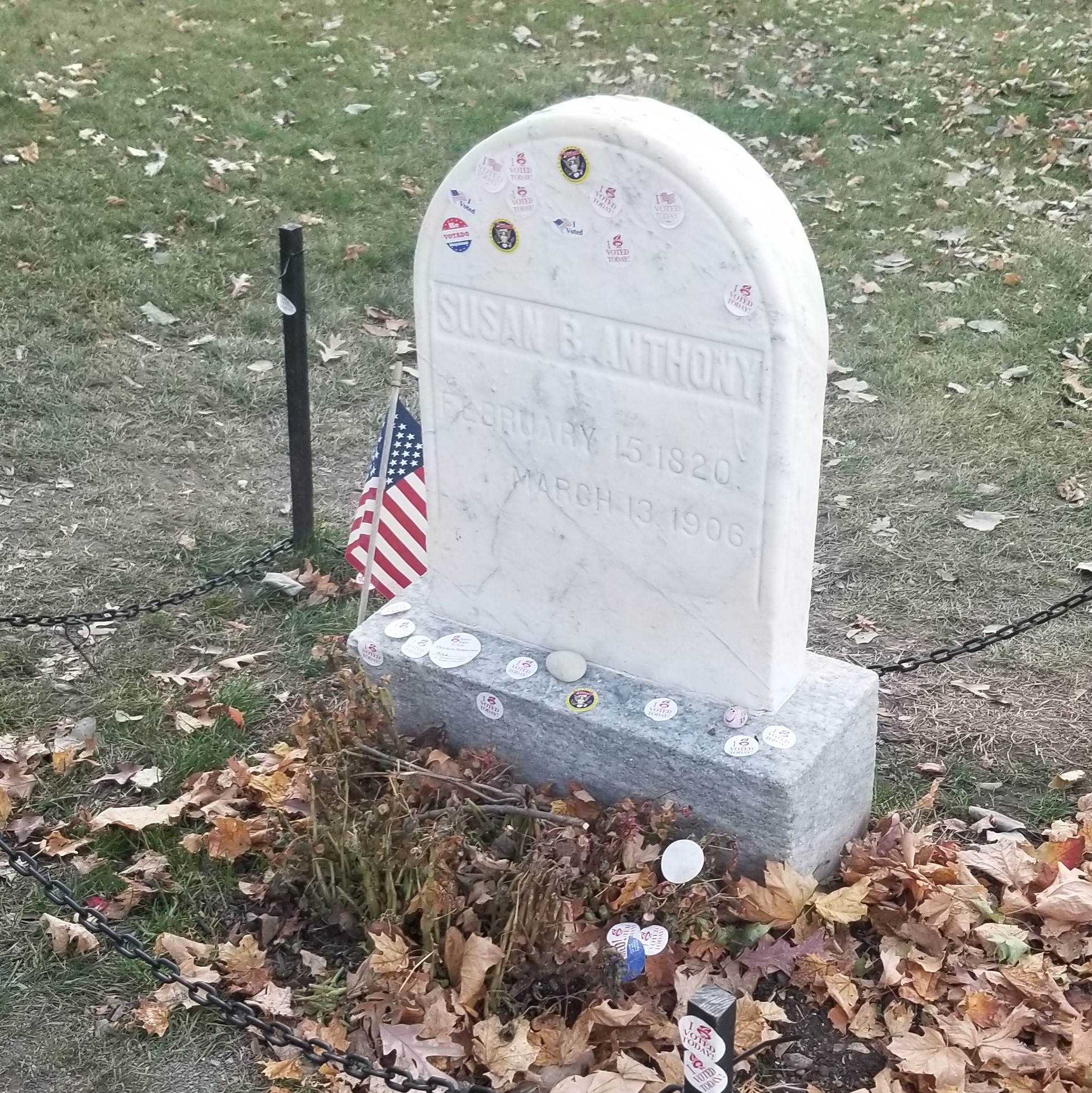
Susan B. Anthony's gravestone with “I voted” stickers on it

Susan B. Anthony Day is a commemorative holiday to celebrate the birth of Anthony and women's suffrage in the United States. The holiday is February 15—Anthony's birthday.

In 2016, Lovely Warren, the mayor of Rochester, put a red, white and blue sign next to Anthony's grave on the day after Hillary Clinton obtained the nomination at the Democratic National Convention. The sign stated, "Dear Susan B., we thought you might like to know that for the first time in history, a woman is running for president representing a major party. 144 years ago, your illegal vote got you arrested. It took another 48 years for women to finally gain the right to vote. Thank you for paving the way." The city of Rochester put pictures of the message on Twitter and requested that residents go to Anthony's grave to sign it.

== See also ==
- List of civil rights leaders
- List of suffragists and suffragettes
- List of women's rights activists
- Susan B. Anthony abortion dispute
- Timeline of women's suffrage
- Timeline of women's suffrage in the United States
- Women's suffrage organizations
- Susan B. Anthony dollar
- Susan B. Anthony Day
