= Elizabeth Cady Stanton House =

Elizabeth Cady Stanton House may refer to:

- Elizabeth Cady Stanton House (Tenafly, New Jersey), listed on the NRHP
- Elizabeth Cady Stanton House (Seneca Falls, New York), listed on the NRHP
