= Elizabeth Cady Stanton House (Tenafly, New Jersey) =

- U.S. National Register of Historic Places
- U.S. National Historic Landmark
- New Jersey Register of Historic Places
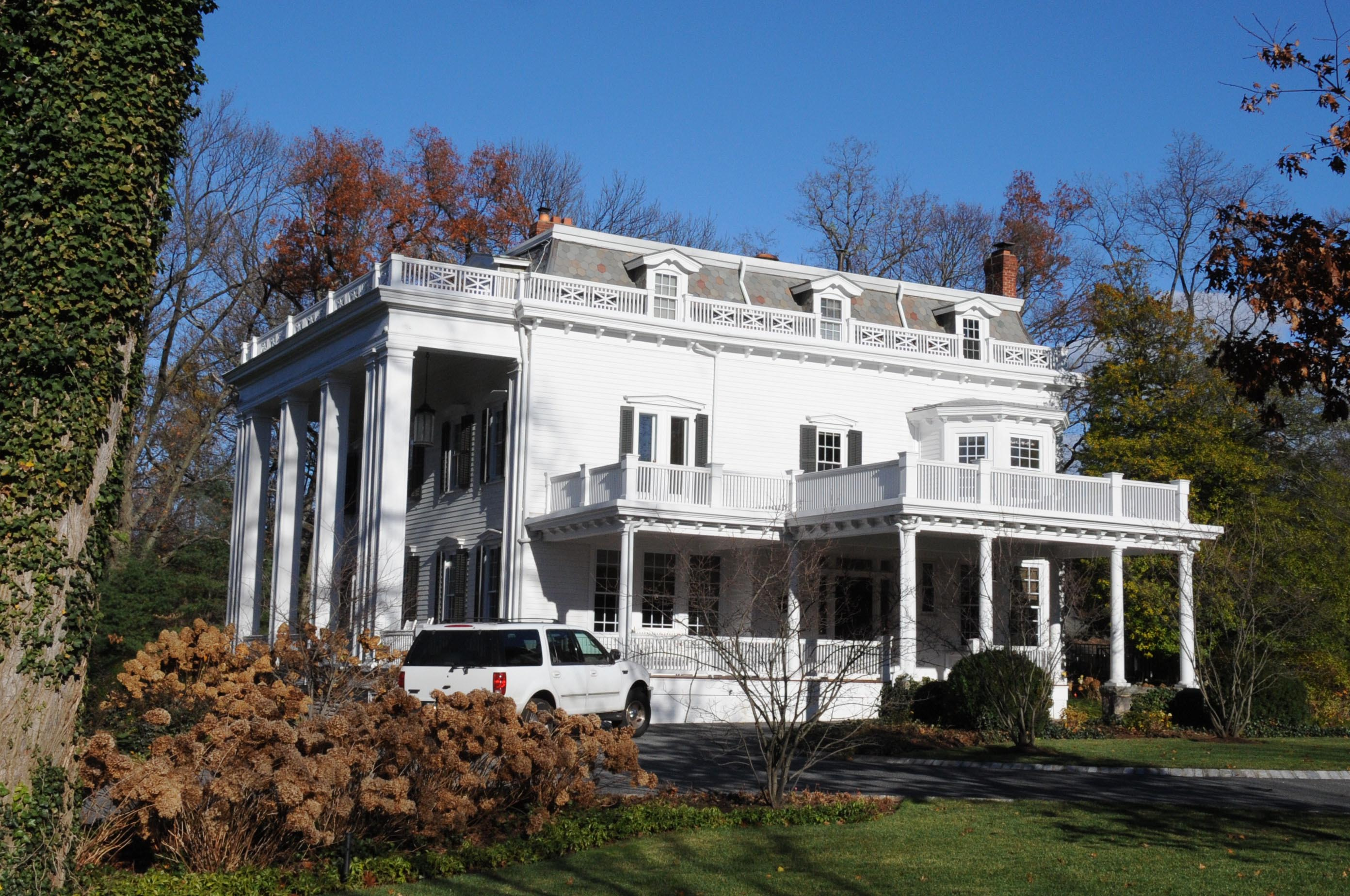
- House in 2015

- Location within Bergen County, New Jersey Location within New Jersey Location within the United States
- Location: 135 Highwood Avenue, Tenafly, New Jersey
- Coordinates: 40.9266°N 73.9544°W
- Built: 1846
- Architectural style: Victorian
- NRHP reference No.: 75001122

Significant dates
- Added to NRHP: May 15, 1975
- Designated NHL: May 15, 1975
- Designated NJRHP: May 15, 1975

The Elizabeth Cady Stanton House in Tenafly, Bergen County, New Jersey, United States, is where Elizabeth Cady Stanton lived from 1868 to 1887, her most active years as a women's rights activist. She had previously lived in Seneca Falls, New York and Boston, Massachusetts.

== History ==
The house was built in 1868 near the Tenafly train station. Stanton lived in the home from 1868 to 1887, although her husband mostly resided in New York City. Income from Stanton's speeches and writings were used to maintain the property. During Stanton's time living in Tenafly, Susan B. Anthony was a frequent visitor as the two women worked on advancing women's rights. While living in Tenafly, Stanton and Anthony collaborated on a three-volume History of Woman Suffrage. Stanton was also living in Tenafly when she attempted to vote only to be turned away at the polls in 1880. One of Stanton's daughter was married on the house's lawn. Stanton sold the house after the death of her husband.

Stanton's home in Tenafly was declared a National Historic Landmark in 1975. Her home in Seneca Falls was earlier declared a National Historic Landmark, in 1965.

The Kahn family purchased the house in 1981, being sold within the family for 1.6 million in 2001. The house sold for $3 million in 2015 to buyers outside of the Kahn family. The house remains privately owned.

== Architecture and layout ==
The house features seven-bedrooms and is 5,449-square-feet. There are six fireplaces and ten foot high ceilings. The house was designed in the Second Empire style and has a mansard roof. The house also features Colonial Revival and Victorian Mansard elements. A large portico was added in the early 20th century after Stanton's ownership.

== See also ==
- List of monuments and memorials to women's suffrage
- National Register of Historic Places listings in Bergen County, New Jersey
