= Elizabeth Cady Stanton Pregnant and Parenting Student Services Act =

The Elizabeth Cady Stanton Pregnant and Parenting Student Services Act would establish a pilot program to provide $10 million annually for 200 grants to encourage institutions of higher education to establish and operate a pregnant and parenting student services office. The on-campus office would serve parenting students, prospective student parents who are pregnant or imminently anticipating an adoption, and students who are placing or have placed a child for adoption. It is named in honor of the prominent suffragist, Elizabeth Cady Stanton.

== 109th United States Congress ==
The act was introduced by Senator Elizabeth Dole (R-NC) on November 8, 2005 as S. 1966. It was referred to the Committee on Health, Education, Labor, and Pensions. It was co-sponsored by Senators Mike DeWine (R-OH) and Rick Santorum (R-PA). On the following day, the House version of the act was introduced by Congresswoman Melissa Hart (R-PA) as H.R. 4265 and was referred to the House Committee on Education and the Workforce. On March 24, 2006 it was referred to the Subcommittee on 21st Century Competitiveness. H.R. 4265 had 14 co-sponsors. 4 were Democrats and 10 were Republicans.

== 110th United States Congress ==
On February 15, 2007, in commemoration of the birthday of Susan B. Anthony, the act was re-introduced by Representatives Marcy Kaptur (D-OH) and Sue Myrick (R-NC) as H.R. 1088. It had 12 co-sponsors. 4 were Democrats and 8 were Republicans. On March 19, 2007 it was re-introduced in the Senate by Elizabeth Dole as S. 915, and referred to the Committee on Health, Education, Labor, and Pensions. It was co-sponsored by Senators Ben Nelson (D-NE) and Robert Casey (D-PA). On Jun 5, 2007 H.R. 1088 was referred to the Subcommittee on Higher Education, Lifelong Learning, and Competitiveness.
