= Elizabeth Cady Stanton House (Seneca Falls, New York) =

Historic house in New York, United States

- U.S. National Register of Historic Places
- U.S. National Historic Landmark
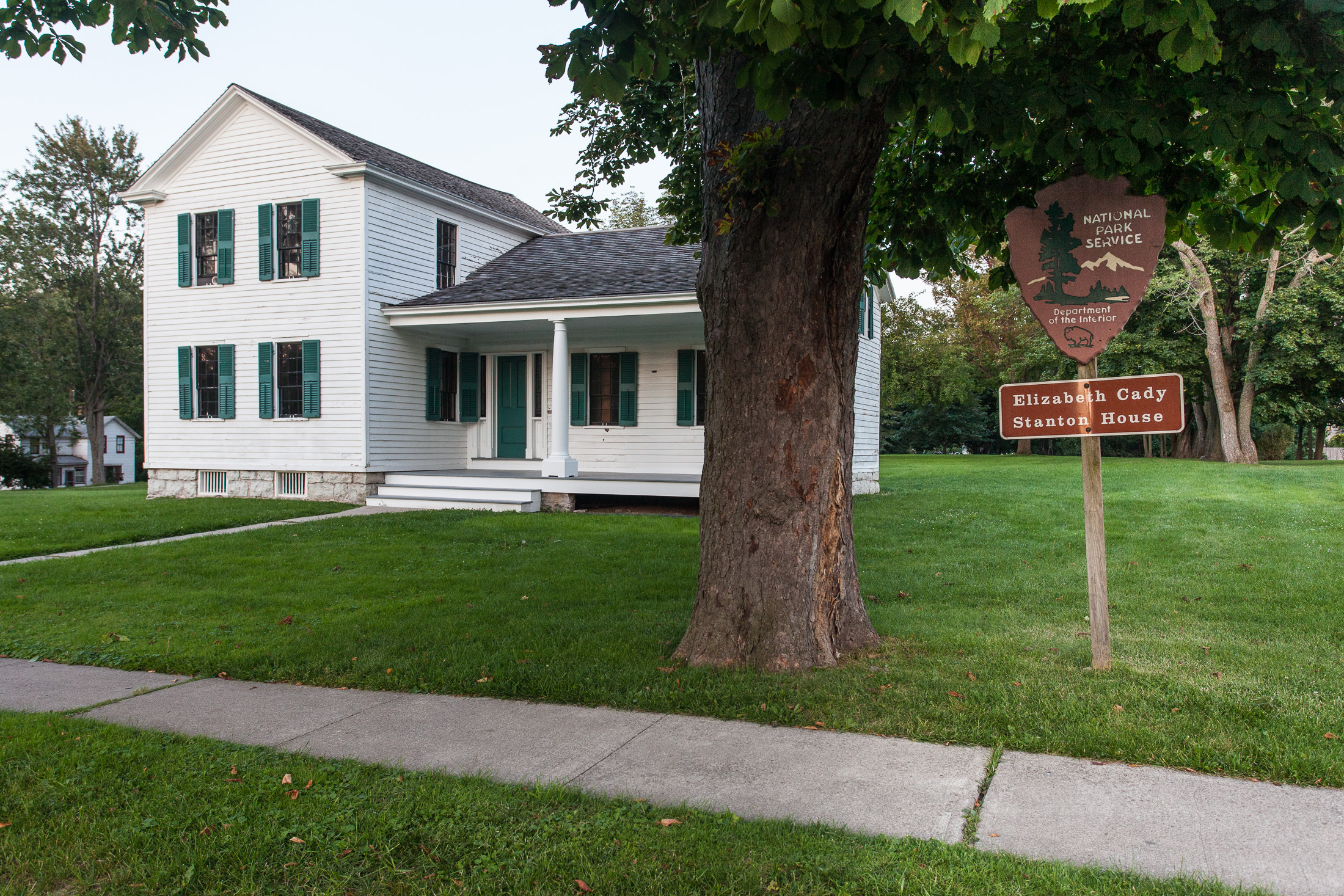
- Elizabeth Cady Stanton House in 2013

- Location within New York Location within the United States
- Location: 32 Washington Street, Seneca Falls, NY
- Coordinates: 42°54′45.46″N 76°47′18.16″W
- Area: less than one acre
- Built: 1830
- NRHP reference No.: 66000572

Significant dates
- Added to NRHP: October 15, 1966
- Designated NHL: June 23, 1965

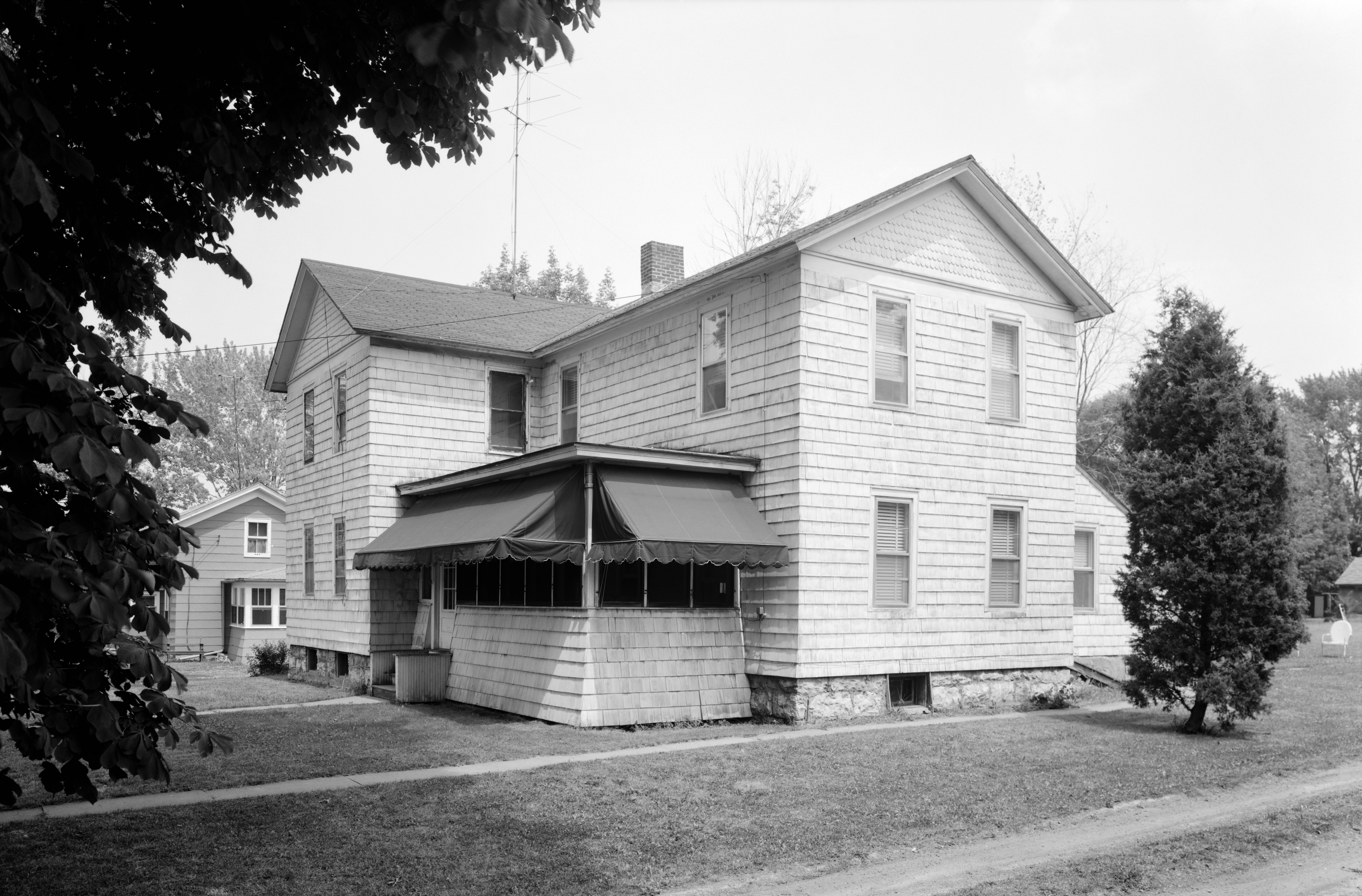
The house in 1968.

The Elizabeth Cady Stanton House is a historic house at 32 Washington Street in the village of Seneca Falls, New York. Built before 1830, it was the home of suffragist Elizabeth Cady Stanton (1815-1902) from 1847 to 1862. It is now a historic house museum as part of Women's Rights National Historical Park. It was declared a National Historic Landmark in 1965.

== Description and history ==
The Elizabeth Cady Stanton House stands in a quiet residential area of Seneca Falls, east of its downtown at the junction of Washington and Seneca Streets. It is a modest 2 1/2-story wood-frame structure, its L shape covered by gabled roofs and its exterior finished in wooden clapboards. The north wing, oriented with its gable to the street, is 2 1/2 stories, while the south wing is a single story with an open porch extending across most of its width. The main entrance is located in the south wing near the junction of the two sections. The house is not architecturally distinguished. A small garage stands southeast of the house.

The property was purchased in 1836-1837 by Samuel and William Bayard, who bought the recently built structure from Colonel Wilhelmus Mynderse, who had founded Seneca Falls. In 1838, William and his family took out a mortgage on the property and were residing there. The Bayard family ran into financial difficulties and were sued several times in the early 1840s. In 1842, the house went up for public auction and was purchased by William A. Sacket and Robert L. Stevenson with a caveat that Bayard could redeem it within one year for the debts owed. Having failed to pay their debt, the property was conveyed in 1844 to William Pennington and the acquired by Elisha Foote Jr., in March. Foote was the husband of Eunice Newton Foote and had trained in law with Daniel Cady, Elizabeth's father. Foote deeded the property to Elizabeth's father in 1845, who in turn gave the property to his daughter in 1846.

The oldest portion of the house, the south wing, was probably built before 1830, with the north wing added by 1840. Henry and Elizabeth Cady Stanton lived in the house from 1847 to 1862. During this period, Elizabeth Cady Stanton was active in organizing the first United States convention on women's suffrage. Held in 1848, the Seneca Falls Convention resulted in the first major calls for women to be granted the right to vote. Stanton remained an influential figure in the women's rights movements of the 19th century until her death in 1902.

The house was acquired by the National Park Service in 1982 to become part of the Women's Rights National Historical Park. It then underwent restoration, removing alterations made after the Stantons sold the property and returning it to its appearance during their occupancy.

== See also ==
- List of monuments and memorials to women's suffrage
- List of National Historic Landmarks in New York
- National Register of Historic Places listings in Seneca County, New York
