= Art in the women's suffrage movement in the United States =

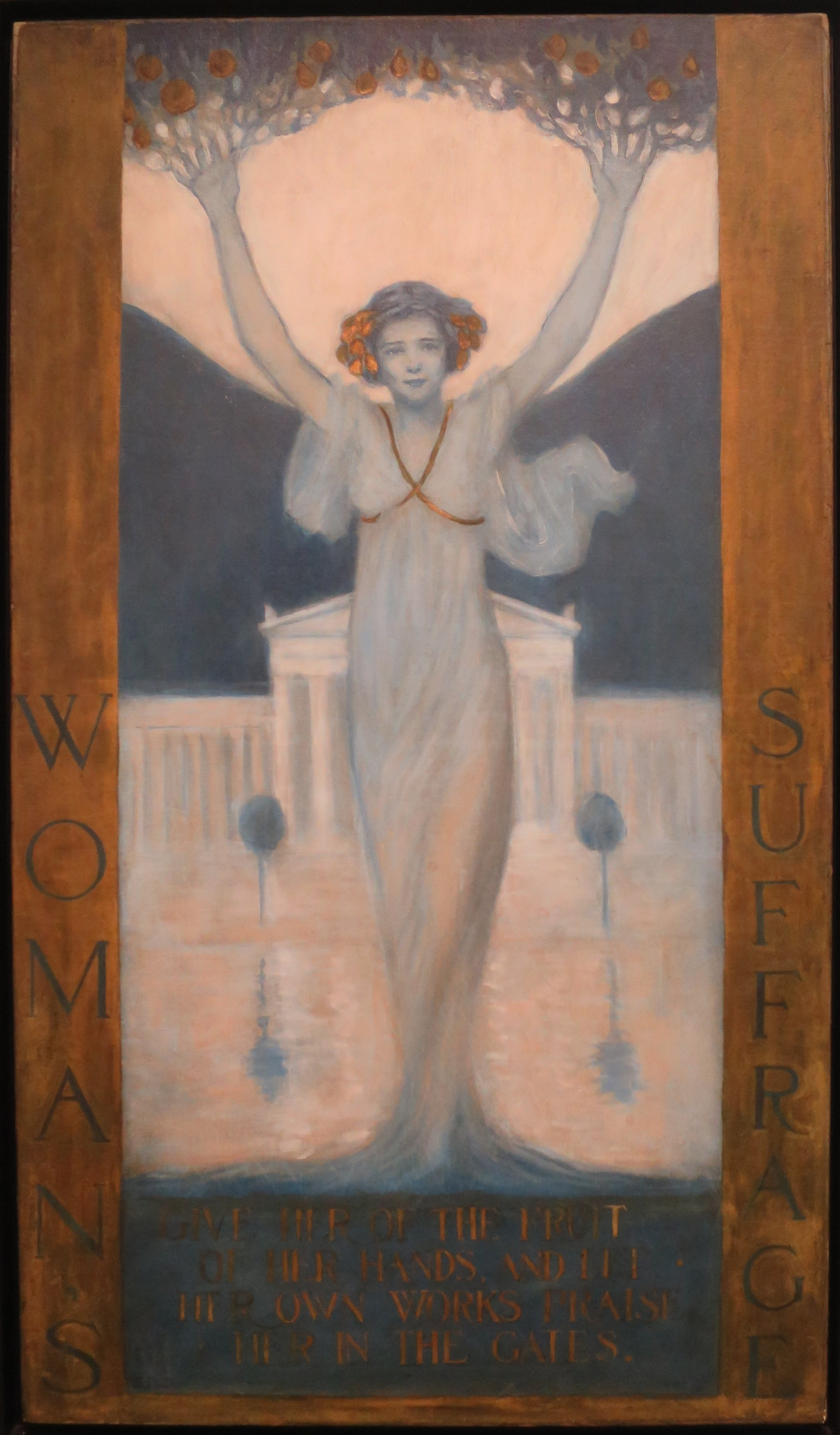
Woman's Suffrageby Evelyn Rumsey Cary, 1905.

Art played a critical role in the women's suffrage movement in the United States. It was used both as propaganda and as a way to represent the leaders of the movement as historical records. Art sales and shows were also used to raise money for campaigns.

In the United States, the women's suffrage movement began in the 1840s with the purpose to gain full voting rights for women. Suffragists succeeded in their effort to receive voting rights on August 26, 1920, when the Nineteenth Amendment was ratified by state legislatures. This amendment stated that voting rights could not be restricted or denied due to the gender of the citizen. There were men and women on both sides of the Women's Suffrage Movement, and opposition by other women was an issue the suffragists faced throughout their campaign.

== Imagery ==
=== Color ===
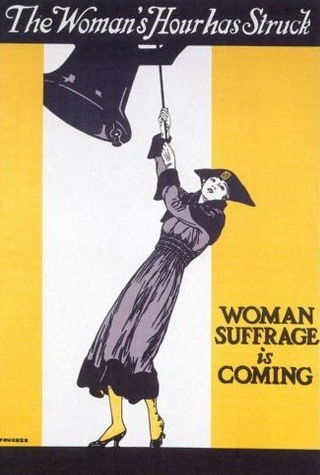
The Woman's Hour Has Struck, 1916 poster

The United States women's suffrage movement was represented largely by the colors gold and yellow. These colors were first used during the campaign for women's suffrage in Kansas by Susan B. Anthony and Elizabeth Cady Stanton. Sometimes the colors purple, white, and green, used by some women's suffrage groups in Britain, were also adopted in the United States, with yellow often replacing the green. American suffragists oftentimes wore white, purple and yellow to their public meetings; the color white symbolizing purity.

The National Woman's Party (NWP) adopted the purple, white, and gold in their flag. Purple stood for loyalty, white for purity, and gold for the "color of light and life."

During the fight for ratification for the 19th Amendment, suffragists wore yellow rose pins, while anti-suffragists wore red roses.

=== Symbolism ===
The imagery of Liberty as a personification was first aligned with abolitionists. Many women, including those who would support women's suffrage, were involved in this movement. The symbol of Liberty was again used during the 1913 Woman Suffrage Procession. In the parade, a woman dressed as Liberty took part in a "living panorama" where she represented the idea of the new woman.

Other patriotic symbols were often seen in women's suffrage art. Miss Columbia as a feminine version of Uncle Sam was depicted to illustrate a less patriarchal version of American culture. Patriotic symbols showed that the values of women voting were part of the United States' "core values."

The sunflower as a women's suffrage symbol was adopted during the 1867 campaign in Kansas.

The theme of mothers and children or babies depicted alone were often used in women's suffrage art. Babies and mothers were used to show that suffragists were caring, loving women, despite what anti-suffragists said about them. This theme also emphasized that women voters were especially tied into the idea of "civic housekeeping" in which women ensured safe homes and food for children. The theme also was linked to the idea that if women are trusted to mother future voters, why can't they themselves vote? Babies and mothers in women's suffrage art reminded men that women needed to have a voice on issues related to children.

White supremacy is also part of much of woman's suffrage movement in the United States. In order to win the vote, white women often neglected the contributions of non-white women. Imagery that shows white women juxtaposed with non-white and other men who were also disenfranchised was meant to show that white women deserved the right to vote. White women were also seen as a symbol of virtue during the 19th century.

== Fine arts ==
Portraiture was one of the most prolific forms of fine arts among suffragists, with portraits of Susan B. Anthony the most popular woman depicted. Portraits were a way of contextualizing the historical importance of women in the public sphere and they also served as role models for younger women. Painted portraits depicted suffragists as somewhere between stateswomen and "respectable matrons." In a different vein, a 1914 work by Theresa Bernstein showed an anonymous women's suffrage speaker silhouetted by "feverish light" which captured the "intense mood of the moment."

Suffrage art was shown at the 1893 World's Columbian Exposition. Anne Whitney showed four portraits of famous women at this event, including a bust of Lucy Stone. Adelaide Johnson also showed work at this exposition. Suffragists also held art exhibitions to raise money. Harriot Stanton Blatch convinced Louisine Havemeyer to loan part of her arts collection for shows at New York City's Knoedler Gallery in April 1912. In 1915, an art show was held at the Macbeth Gallery to raise money for the women's suffrage campaign in New York state. Artists featured included Johnson and Ella Buchanan. The Greenwich Equal Suffrage League auctioned off work by Elmer Livingston MacRae as a fund-raiser.

== Propaganda ==
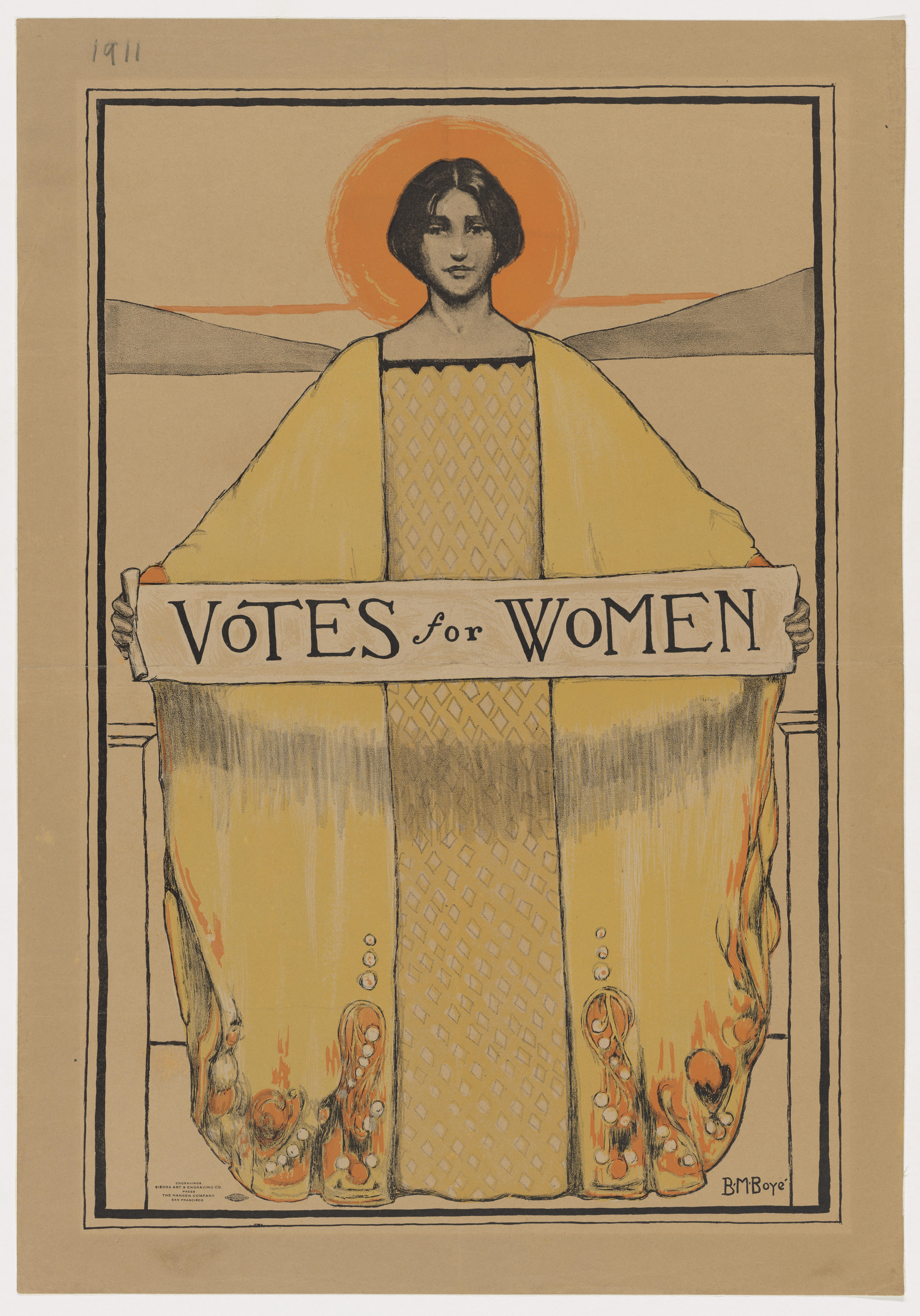
Votes for Women, 1913 poster by Bertha Boye

Propaganda literature and art featuring pro-women's suffrage information was created between the late 19th century and early 20th century. The visual campaign for women's suffrage was one of the longest such movements in the United States. This movement was social so propaganda was crucial to its success. Art was used to convey complex ideas to support pro-suffrage arguments. The themes that were used in women's suffrage propaganda in the United States often featured appeals to justice and reform. By the 1890s, suffragists were finally able to effectively distribute pro-suffrage imagery around the country through the use of press committees and professionals. When women were editors or owners of periodicals, they were in a unique position to engage directly with the public. The women's suffrage journal, the Woman Voter, had a dedicated art editor, Ida Proper.

During the last twenty years of the movement, suffragists emphasized the idea of women's suffrage being a benefit to society. By 1910, suffragists were the ones most often designing and distributing the imagery they wanted to use.

Anti-suffragists, however, countered suffragists' arguments in several ways. Anti-suffragists believed that women and men had different roles, and that women belonged at home, not in politics. They claimed that the home itself would be destroyed if women were allowed to vote.

=== Posters ===
Poster contests were held to design new art for the women's suffrage movement.

=== Postcards ===
Postcards were a very prominent form of propaganda during the suffrage movement, as they were very popular from the years 1902 to 1915. The period between 1898 and 1917 is referred to as the "Golden Age of Postcards." One of the earliest women's suffrage postcards was sent by the president of the Young Men's Women Suffrage League in 1874. The New York Ladies' Suffrage Committee sent out postcards for their December 1886 meeting. The biggest publisher of "official" suffrage postcards was the National American Woman Suffrage Association (NAWSA). NAWSA created their own publishing company by 1913. Overall, around 4,500 different postcard designs with women's suffrage themes were created.

Postcards could have text, illustrations, or even photographs. Suffrage organizations often issued their own "official cards," selling them at suffrage events. Official postcards helped promoted the organizations that gave them out or sold them. Women's suffrage postcards also were printed with holiday themes. Many postcards held suffrage messages, and these became very popular. However, commercial postcards, unlike official suffrage postcards, were often printed with anti-suffragist messages. Commercial publishers responded to public demand and their printed images often had greater emotional appeal in their suffrage arguments.

=== Music ===
The popular poem turned song "Battle Hymn of the Republic" written by Julia Ward Howe and later put to the tune of "John Brown's Body" was adapted to many causes, including the cause of women's suffrage. In 1890 Catharine Weed Campbell added her own spin on the song as it became "The Battle Hymn of the Suffragists." Other notable songs of the movement include: “Woman's Rights” (1853), “She's Good Enough to Be Your Baby's Mother and She's Good Enough to Vote with You”, and “Daughters of Freedom the Ballot Be Yours” by the Poet George Cooper. Each of these songs were extremely supportive of the suffragists. Music is often powerful, catchy, and persuasive so it played a notable role in furthering the women's suffrage movement.

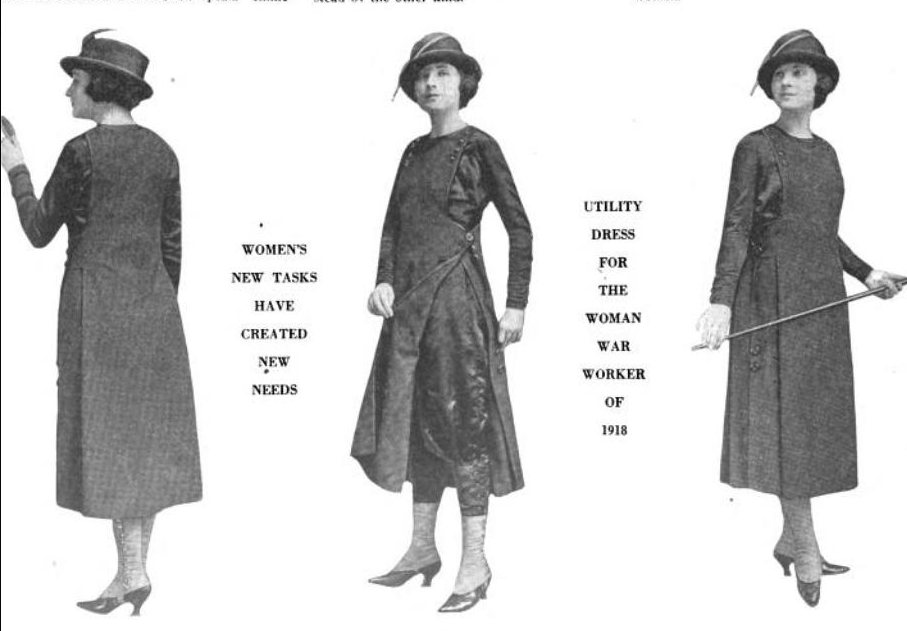
Utility Dress for the Woman War Worker of 1918

=== Fashion ===
In the early 19th century women's fashion was physically restrictive due to a strong focus on emphasizing feminine figures, with tight waistlines and restrictive sleeves. These features in women's everyday fashion made it difficult or even impossible for women to participate in the same or similar activities that men could. As the suffrage movement progressed, a type of clothing called bloomers grew in popularity. They allowed women to have more freedom of movement while still remaining relatively modest. They were popularized mainly by Suffragette leaders Elizabeth Cady Stanton, Susan B. Anthony, and Lucy Stone. Eventually, the popularity of Bloomers became a distraction to the main purpose of the suffrage movement, so women wore them less and less often.

The Woman Citizen featured a fashion page which showed different styles for working women.

White dresses worn by the suffragists represented purity and femininity. During parades, suffragists would often coordinate and dress all in white.

=== Film ===
As motion pictures, nickelodeon theaters, and other ways to create and share films became popular, these methods were most commonly used by anti-Suffragettes. Motion Pictures produced by these groups often portrayed women abandoning their families, acting in inappropriate or "unladylike" manners, and forcing their husbands to step into the role of motherhood they had abandoned.

Pro-suffrage films were produced after the many anti-suffrage films had been created, often as a response to the claims of the antis. These and played a critical role in restoring the image of the suffragists as strong, feminine, and educated women. Suffragists have been recognized as some of the first to harness this art form to create social change. Many suffrage films were meant to challenge stereotypical gender roles.

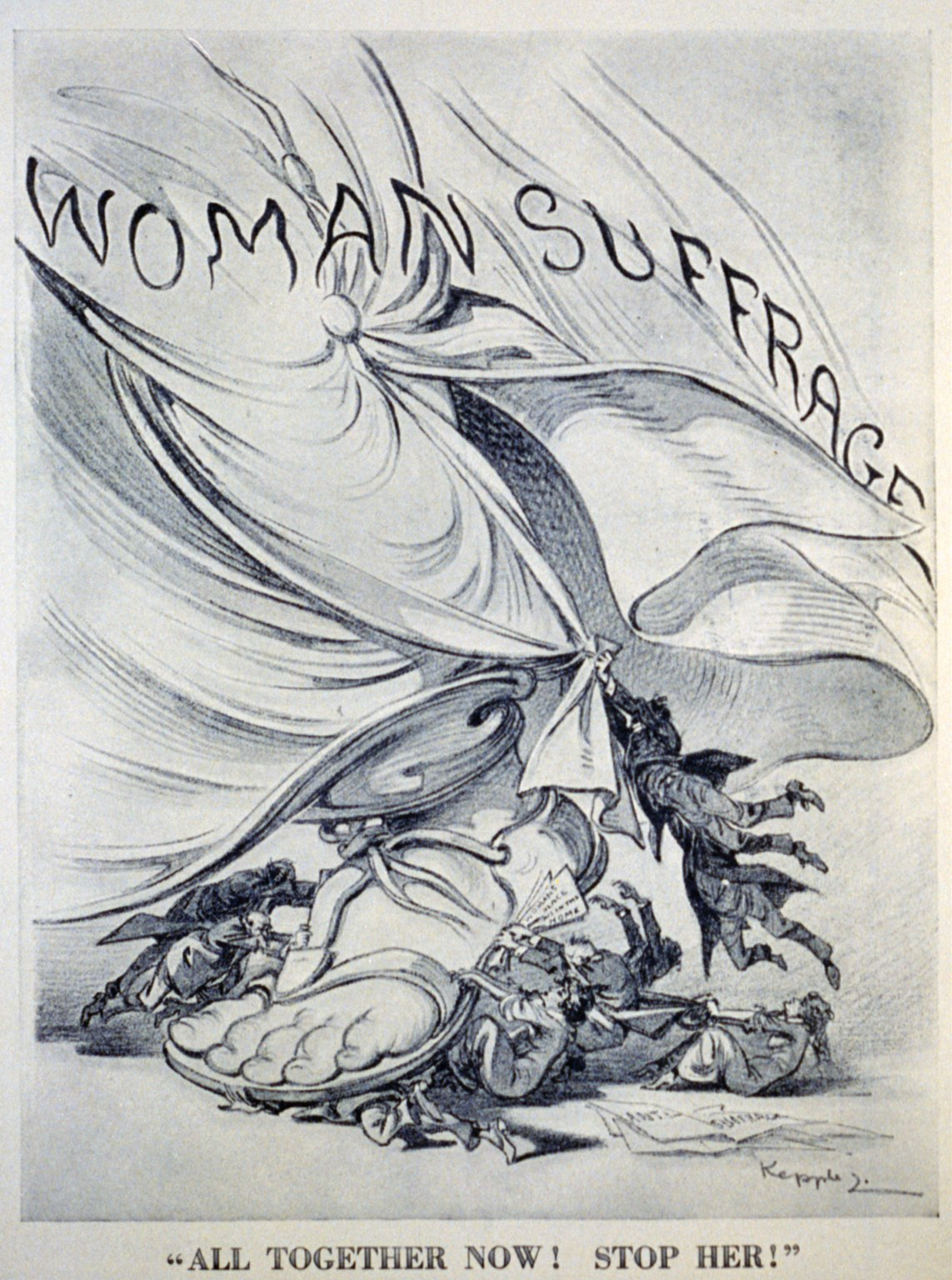
"All together now! Stop her!" by Udo Keppler, 1914

=== Cartoons ===
Cartoons about the women's rights movement began to appear early on after the first Women's Rights Conventions were held. Cartoons that depicted men and women in roles that are stereotypically held by the opposite gender were also a popular form of criticism of the movement. These types of cartoons remained popular during the 19th century.

A popular cartoon from Puck, "The Awakening," drawn by Hy Mayer was featured on February 20, 1915. It uses symbolism derived from suffrage maps. The suffrage maps were used starting in 1908 and showed the states that granted women's suffrage. The states that were "suffrage states" were eventually changed to white, reinforcing the idea that women would "purify" politics. In "The Awakening," there is a "goddess" figure that walks across the western states that have granted suffrage to women and points towards an image of the rest of the country, where women are drowning in blackness. The allusion to racism was intentional.

The cartoons created by suffragists were largely made with the purpose to provide a different perspective to the negative portrayals of suffragist women in anti-suffrage cartoons. Nina Allender was one of the notable cartoonists of this era, and after being enlisted by Alice Paul, worked to create the image of the "Allender Girl". Educated, youthful, and feminine, the Allender Girl would showcase the suffragette movement in a positive way. Other cartoonists between 1910 and 1920 used the imagery of the "Gibson Girl."

Cartoonists and the women they depicted in their cartoons were mainly white, despite the existence of many women of color in the movement. This may be due to the strategy of the suffragettes to appeal to men and white supremacists, whom may have opposed to the participation of colored women.

== Artists ==
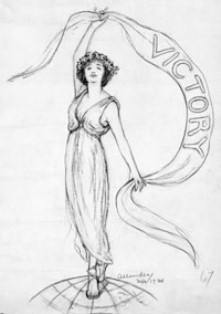
Victory by Nina E. Allender

=== Nina E. Allender ===
Nina Allender was the official cartoonist for the National Women's Party (NWP). She was an American artist and supporter of the women's suffrage movement. She aided the movement in many ways, she drew cartoons to be used as propaganda, she was the artist for a periodical titled, The Suffragist and she designed a commemorative pin for the women who had been imprisoned to further the movement. One of her famous drawings was titled, Victory. This drawing shows a woman standing tall and holding a banner with the word victory written on it.

=== Julia Ward Howe ===
Born in New York in 1819, Julia Ward Howe was raised by her aunt who played a role in introducing Julia to the literary arts. She was publishing literary works anonymously at age 20, and went on to write The Battle Hymn of the Republic. She took part in founding several Suffrage organizations in the US, including: The American Woman Suffrage Association (AWSA), The New England Suffrage Association, and The Massachusetts Woman Suffrage Association.

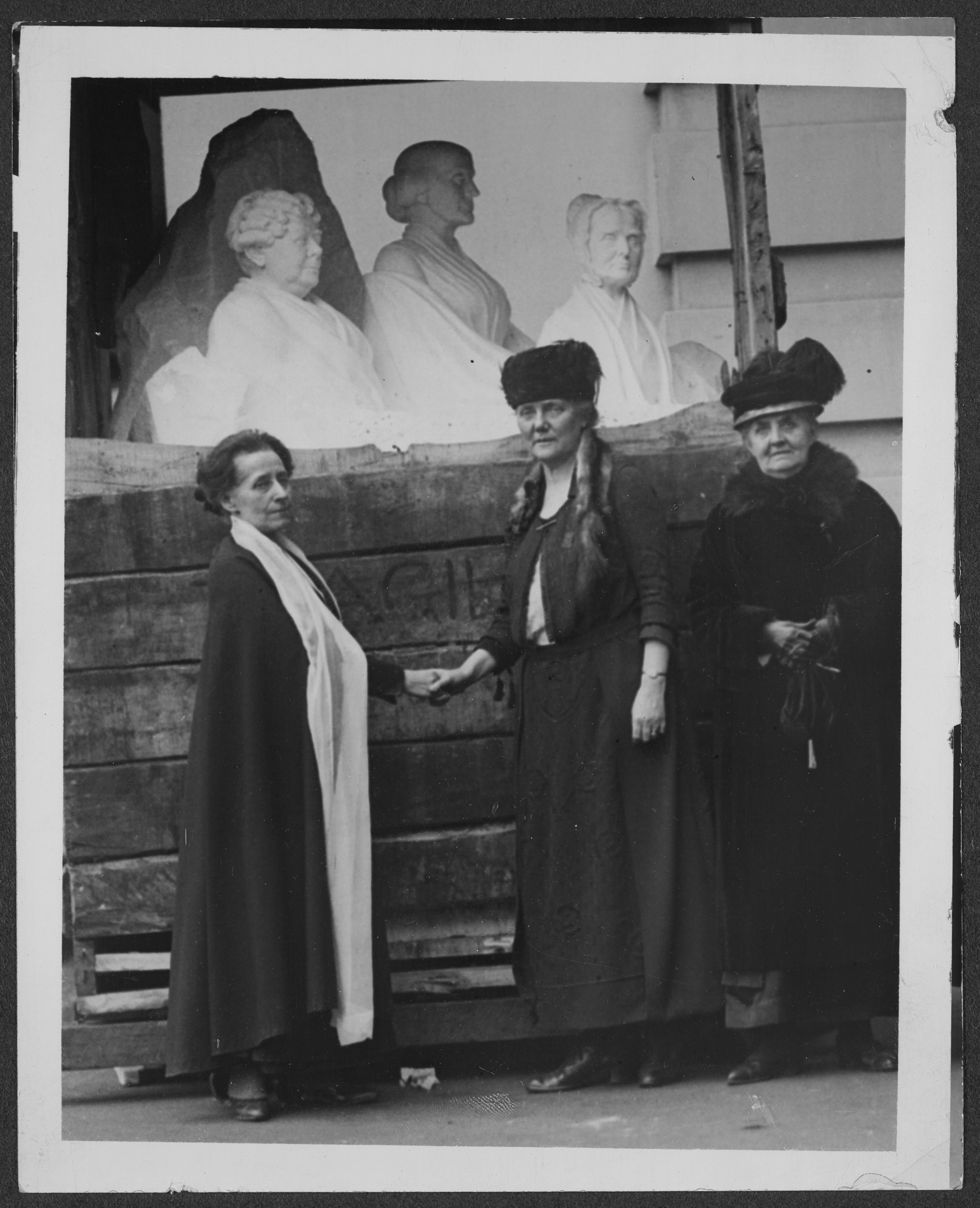
Adelaide Johnson, sculptor, with her 1920 work, Portrait Monument.

=== Adelaide Johnson ===
Adelaide Johnson's sculptures were dedicated to recording the images of the "great women of her time." Johnson had connections to both the early suffragists, such as Anthony and Stanton and also with newer suffragists, like Alice Paul.

=== Others ===
Other notable artists who produced women's suffrage work include Blanche Ames Ames, Theresa Bernstein, Nell Brinkley, Katherine Dreier, Abastenia Eberle, Laura E. Foster, Anna Hyatt Huntington, Rose O'Neill, and Alice Morgan Wright.

== See also ==
- Suffrage Torch
- Women's suffrage in the United States
- Women's suffrage in states of the United States
- Timeline of women's suffrage
- The Suffragist
- Music and women's suffrage in the United States
