= Portrait Monument =

1920 marble sculpture by Adelaide Johnson in Washington, D.C., U.S.

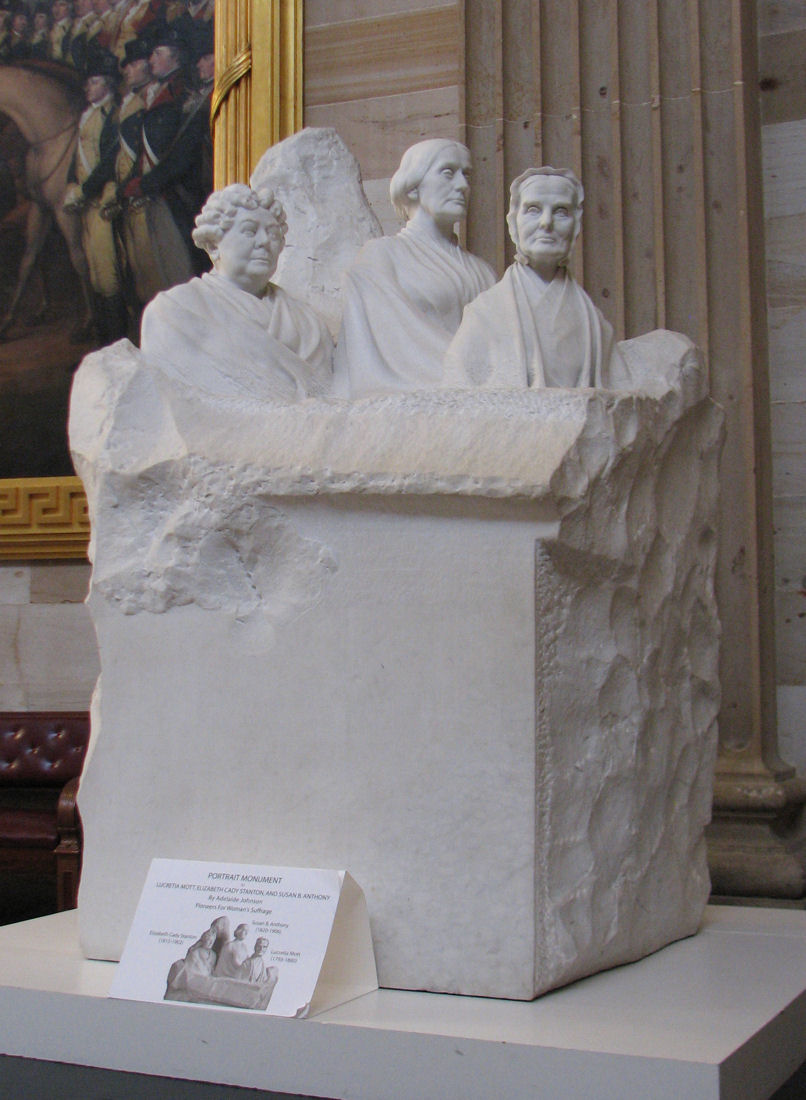
- Artist: Adelaide Johnson
- Year: 1920
- Medium: Marble sculpture
- Subject: left to right: Elizabeth Cady Stanton; Susan B. Anthony; Lucretia Mott

Portrait Monument is a 1920 marble sculpture by Adelaide Johnson, installed in the U.S. Capitol's rotunda, in Washington, D.C. The artwork was dedicated in 1921 and features portrait busts of Elizabeth Cady Stanton, Susan B. Anthony, and Lucretia Mott.

== See also ==
- Women's Rights Pioneers Monument, 2020 statue in New York City
- Statue of Elizabeth Cady Stanton, 2021 statue in Johnston, New York
- Art in the women's suffrage movement in the United States
- List of monuments and memorials to women's suffrage
