= Pam Elam =

American lawyer

Pamela (Pam) Elam is a retired attorney and feminist activist who has worked for both women's and LGBT rights throughout her career. Elam was born in Kentucky, where she gained her undergraduate degree and JurisDoctorate before moving to New York to pursue her master's degree. Since, she has influenced New York governance through professional offices and activist organizations, and represented the LGBT community as an open lesbian since the late 1970s. Since retiring from government work, she has continued her activism through projects promoting women's visibility in New York City.

== Education ==
Elam received a BA in political science from the University of Kentucky in 1972, and earned her Juris Doctor in 1975 from the same institution. After arriving in New York in 1978, she began studying at Sarah Lawrence College to gain a Masters in Women's History.

== Career ==
=== Early activism ===
Elam began speaking on women's issues and rights at the age of 13 at Kentucky's 1964 Speech Festival. In the 1970s she founded several organizations for feminist issues in Kentucky, and campaigned for the legislative institution of the Equal Rights Amendment, rights for battered women, and the Displaced Homemakers Program in her state's General Assembly. In 1977, she represented Kentucky at the National Women's Conference. After she came out as a lesbian at Sarah Lawrence College, Elam adopted another facet of feminist activism: advocating for LGBT rights.

=== New York political participation ===
In New York City, Elam became an active civic participant, both professionally and informally, in New York state government. She has acted as a member of the Board of Directors of Gay and Lesbian Independent Democrats, New York Women Against Rape and the New York State Women's Political Caucus. As a legislative aide to the New York City Council, Elam represented feminist causes and, throughout the 1980s, organized more than one hundred meetings for the Committee on Women. In 1988, she was also a facilitator of the first New York City presidential candidates' debate on women's issues. Elam worked in public relations roles, like consulting and campaigning for politicians Elizabeth Holtzman and Andrew Stein, before becoming Associate Commissioner for Intergovernmental Relations and External Affairs at the New York City Department of Employment from 1994 to 1998. In 1997, she assumed the role of Deputy Commissioner for Intergovernmental Affairs for the New York City Human Resources Administration. She then went on to work in New York City Mayor Rudy Giuliani's Office of Intergovernmental Affairs as Coordinator before becoming Chief of Staff to New York State Senator Thomas K. Duane in 2004. Following this role, Elam officially retired in 2008, although she continues to participate in LGBT and feminist activism today.

== Legacy ==
=== Organizations ===
Elam was the winner of the National Organization for Women's 1988 Susan B. Anthony Award, after she restarted the organizations New York City Lesbian Rights committee in 1986. During the 1980s, Elam promoted both LGBT and women's rights in New York City by assisting in the foundation of organizations like Lesbians in Government and the NYC Lesbian Rights Committee, as well as the inaugural NYC conference on Lesbian Identity and Empowerment. She participated in the 1980 creation of the Congressional Union, an organization highly focused on civil disobedience for women's rights. While protesting with this organization, she was arrested for burning President Ronald Reagan in effigy at the White House for his failure to promote feminist ideals. Elam similarly assisted in the formation of Lesbians United, a group that unites a panoply of coordinated pro-lesbian organizations, and has organized multiple forums on issues of LGBT history participation in government, focusing on lesbian priorities and needs of involvement.

=== Historical projects ===
==== Elizabeth Cady Stanton and Susan B. Anthony Statue Fund Inc. ====
Elam begun an ongoing campaign entitled "Where Are the Women," for which she serves as President. This campaign seeks to put statues of notable, historical women in Central Park, and was successful in placing the 2020 Women's Rights Pioneers Monument. The Statue Fund project is focused on honoring champions of women's suffrage, Elizabeth Cady Stanton and Susan B. Anthony. In doing this, the campaign corrected the absence of non-fictional women's representation in Central Park, a significant New York City landmark. In an interview with Women You Should Know, Elam said,

There are numerous representations of the female form (like angels, nymphs and allegorical figures), but statues celebrating the vast and varied contributions of real women are nowhere to be found.

The campaign officially obtained approval and an assigned location in Central Park to build the monument on November 6, 2016. The Statue Fund also has gained a $500,000 grant from New York Life in 2016.

==== Susan B. Anthony and Elizabeth Cady Stanton Corner ====
Elam has been successful in memorializing Susan B. Anthony and Elizabeth Cady Stanton through the naming of a street corner in New York City in their honor. This tribute is in close vicinity to where the two women crafted their newspaper, The Revolution. In 1998, she also assisted in facilitating a national celebration honoring of 150 years since Stanton and Lucretia Mott's Seneca Falls Convention.
