= Women's Rights Pioneers Monument =

Sculpture by Meredith Bergmann in Central Park, Manhattan, New York, U.S.

- Subject: Sojourner Truth; Susan B. Anthony; Elizabeth Cady Stanton
- Location: New York City, New York, U.S.; 40.7705°N 73.9725°W

The Women's Rights Pioneers Monument is a sculpture by Meredith Bergmann. It was installed in Central Park, Manhattan, New York City, on August 26, 2020, coinciding with Women's Equality Day. The sculpture is located at the northwest corner of Literary Walk along the Central Park Mall. It commemorates and depicts Sojourner Truth (c. 1797–1883), Susan B. Anthony (1820–1906), and Elizabeth Cady Stanton (1815–1902), pioneers in the suffrage movement who advocated women's right to vote and who were pioneers of the larger movement for women's rights.

It is the first sculpture in Central Park to depict historical women and was created to "break the bronze ceiling". Previously, the only other female figures depicted in the park were Alice from Alice in Wonderland and Juliet from Romeo and Juliet. Original plans for the memorial included only Stanton and Anthony, but the National Congress of Black Women (NCBW) raised objections to this monument. The President at the time, C. Delores Tucker, expressed that the formation of this monument is non-inclusive towards the historical legacy of Black women activists continues the practice of historical whitewashing.

== History ==
=== Funding ===
The notion of the Women's Rights Pioneers Monument project was conceived in 2013 by a faction of volunteers overseen by Pam Elam, a retired lawyer and feminist, and Coline Jenkins, Elizabeth Cady Stanton's great-great-great granddaughter. The Monumental Women Association was founded by this group in 2014 to raise funds for a project called the Elizabeth Cady Stanton and Susan B. Anthony Statue Fund, with an objective to "break the bronze ceiling in Central Park by creating the park's first statue of non-fictional women there. The phrase "break the bronze ceiling" is a reference to the common phrase "breaking the glass ceiling" with relation to the lack of statues of women in America, since only 8% of sculptures around the U.S. are of women. Previously, there had been no new additions to Central Park's collection of statues since the 1950s. The campaign was run by Gary Ferdman and Myriam Miedzian, who argued that Stanton and Anthony were ideal subjects for the monument based on their legacy as "long lasting leaders of the largest non-violent revolution in our nation's history." The Parks Department rejected the original Stanton/Anthony proposal multiple times. The department cited a rule about them having to have relevance or a connection to New York City or Central Park, though this policy has been selectively enforced in the past. Despite the two having founded the National Woman Suffrage Association for New York City and published their newspaper The Revolution near City Hall, the department still required at least one of them to also have a connection to the park. The statue's proponents successfully argued that Anthony used to walk across Central Park on her daily commute.

Monumental Women raised $1.5 million in mostly private funding, including contributions from foundations, businesses and over 1,000 individual donations. Several troops of the Girl Scouts of Greater New York donated cookie-sale profits, and the fund received a $500,000 grant from New York Life. Girl Scout Troop 3484 of New York protested the lack of female representation in New York's public monuments, which brought national attention to the current effort of raising funds for the suffragist's statue. Manhattan borough president Gale Brewer, who was a vocal supporter of the project, and city councilwoman Helen Rosenthal also donated a combined $135,000 to the project. Johnnie Walker, the Scotch whisky brand, pledged a purchase-driven fundraiser of $1 per bottle sold of their limited edition Jane Walker whisky, contributing $250,000. Other supporters included elected officials, every member of the New York City Council Women's Caucus, Congresswomen, U.S. Senators, and historians.

=== Statue design ===
The New York City Department of Parks and Recreation issued a request for qualifications and request for proposals for the monument, which attracted 91 submissions. A blind jury reviewed the submissions and narrowed them to four qualified finalists. The competition was coordinated and managed by architecture firm Beyer Blinder Belle. The design contract for the Women's Rights Pioneers Monument was awarded in July 2018 to sculptor Meredith Bergmann, a longtime resident of Manhattan. Bergmann had been thinking of a statue as early as 1995, when she worked on a film set in Central Park and noticed there were "no sculptures of actual women of note and accomplishment." The initial statue design was based on a photo of Anthony and Stanton side by side, with a long scroll tumbling down into a ballot box.

Bergmann's design was intended to fit the park's neoclassical architecture while being suitable for its location. The statue depicts Sojourner Truth speaking, Susan B. Anthony organizing, and Elizabeth Cady Stanton writing, "three essential elements of activism," in Bergmann's vision. Bergmann researched the women extensively, painstakingly studying every photo and description she could find in order to accurately portray not just their physical characteristics, but also their personalities. She believed it is important that a monument to them be "larger than life" to reflect the large impact that they had on history.

The first design faced public outcry for celebrating two white suffragettes at the exclusion of Black suffragettes, ignoring the prejudices that marked the white suffrage movement; in response, Bergmann revised the statue to include Black activist Sojourner Truth. The revised statue shows Truth collaborating at a table with Anthony and Stanton, with each representing the three elements of activism, "Sojourner Truth is speaking, Susan B. Anthony is organizing, and Elizabeth Cady Stanton is writing." The scroll was omitted. The New York City Public Design Commission approved Bergmann's statue design on October 21, 2019.

Scholars have noted that the Women's Rights Pioneers Monument reflects both progress and limitation in feminist commemoration. While the addition of Sojourner Truth marked an effort at racial inclusion, rhetoric scholar Jessica Enoch argues that this "project of inclusion" risks portraying a simplified vision of racial harmony without fully confronting the racism present within the suffrage movement. Art historian Sierra Rooney similarly observes that the monument's neoclassical style, shaped by Central Park's design regulations, reproduces traditional masculine conventions of heroism even as it centers women.

=== Creation and dedication ===
After the commission gave its approval, discussions continued regarding the framing of Truth, Anthony, and Stanton as collaborators. Bergmann worked on a tight timeline to complete the statue in time for the unveiling, stating it was the fastest she has ever completed a work of this scale. After receiving approval, Bergmann immediately began creating the clay figures; the rest of the process, including making molds, casts, pouring the molten bronze, final touch-ups and patina, took nearly all the remaining time.

The sculpture was unveiled in Central Park on August 26, 2020, also celebrated as Women's Equality Day, to mark the centennial anniversary of the passage of the 19th Amendment, which granted women the right to vote nationwide. Additionally, supporters of the movement, such as Pam Elam, Gale Brewer, sculptor Meredith Bergmann, and former New York senator Hillary Rodham Clinton, were present and gave speeches at the unveiling. The sculpture was also paired with a "talking statues" project where actresses gave narration to the activists.

== Criticism ==
The monument's initial design faced significant criticism, as it featured only Susan B. Anthony and Elizabeth Cady Stanton. The two women lean over a scroll listing the names of 22 other influential women's rights advocates. This design was criticized for reducing the roles of the other activists (seven of whom are nonwhite women) by portraying Stanton and Anthony being above the scroll, implicating that the two are standing on all of those named below them. In the second maquette of the statue, the scroll was removed entirely, leaving only Stanton and Anthony. This version of the statue was unanimously approved by the New York City Public Design Commission.

The Commission conditionally approved the monument while requiring that the applicants "work to identify meaningful ways to acknowledge and commemorate nonwhite women who played an active role in the Woman Suffrage Movement". The monument began receiving public criticism about its lack of representation of nonwhite women. Statue fund organizers Miedzian and Ferdman claimed that the first three volumes of The History of Woman Suffrage, which Stanton and Anthony co-edited, found African American woman suffragists mentioned at least 85 times. Scholars, drawing on feminist epistemology, argue that the monument simplifies and masks persistent epistemological fractures in the 19th‑century women's rights movement. These include debates over the Fifteenth Amendment, Black men's suffrage, and instances of anti-Black rhetoric, which are obscured by portraying Stanton, Anthony, and Truth as unified. Historian Martha Jones wrote that the monument promoted the myth of the suffrage movement led by White women and celebrated activists steeped in racist prejudice. Jones called particularly for the inclusion of Sojourner Truth, stating that "Her vision for women's rights insisted that we imagine a nation in which women's futures were no longer troubled by color, status and other man-made differences. That is a vision worth promoting, for our daughters and for ourselves."

In the 1990's, a similar criticism was levied towards the Portrait Monument after its unveiling in 1997. Many African American organizations criticized the monument for its lack of representation of African American feminists. This shows that this particular criticism towards statues of this nature are not new, highlighting an underlying problem with how black women's contributions to American feminist movements often go ignored. Additionally, critics of the monument were similarly bothered by the inclusion of Stanton and Anthony who had opposed the 15th amendment due to their belief that black people were not equal to white people. The request for the addition of Sojourner Truth to the Portrait Monument by C. Delores Tucker was denied however, unlike for the Women's Rights Pioneers Monument.

The statue was unveiled shortly after an incident that drastically changed the political landscape of the time. In 2017, a white supremacist drove into a crowd of peaceful protesters against the statue honoring General Robert E. Lee to which Donald Trump, current president of the time, said that both sides were to blame which upset people because it demonstrated his "implicit tolerance". This began to highlight many of the statues that were rooted in political histories which also contributed to the political discussions of the Women's Rights Pioneer Monument.

Truth's inclusion, intended to symbolize cross-racial collaboration and acknowledge the role of Black women in the suffrage movement, sparked further debate. One scholar, Karma Chávez, stated that the monument "integrates Truth into present-day suffrage memory without asking viewers to engage the racism that shaped the movement." Similarly, Lauren Ann Bickell suggests that this monument follows a precedent set in the 19th century History of Woman Suffrage series, where "Elizabeth Cady Stanton and Susan B. Anthony hold dominant presences, while the inclusion of alternative figures is either marginal or corrective." Critics argued that while the monument now recognized Black women's involvement, it might also inadvertently downplay the racism inherent within some segments of the white suffrage movement, particularly in the years following the Fifteenth Amendment, which allowed Black men to vote. Critics of the revised monument have also argued that its composition (depicting a fictional meeting of Anthony, Stanton and Truth) misrepresents the suffrage movement and retroactively erases historical evidence of racism within it. Todd Fine, who was president of the Washington Street Advocacy Group, and Jacob Morris, director of the Harlem Historical Society, collaborated in writing a letter asking for another redesign. The letter garnered over 20 signatures because they believed that the monument did not accurately reflect the differences between White and Black suffrage activisms. The monument has also been interpreted as a reflection of broader challenges accompanying monument commemoration. Critics have discussed how efforts to create inclusive representations can lead to the oversimplification of complex historical narratives, such as the nuanced tensions between feminism and racism within suffrage activism.

== See also ==
- 2020 in art
- List of monuments and memorials to women's suffrage
- Portrait Monument, 1920 sculpture, U.S. Capitol rotunda, Washington, D.C.
- Statue of Elizabeth Cady Stanton, 2021 statue in Johnston, New York
