= Alathena Johnson Smith =

American child psychologist

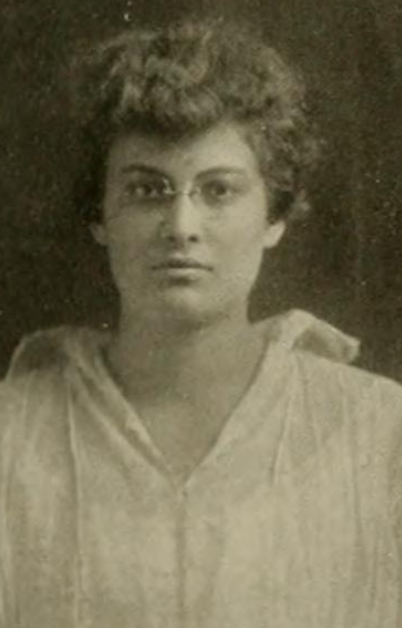
- Alathena Johnson Smith, from the 1915 yearbook of Wellesley College
- Born: February 8, 1894; Chicago, Illinois
- Died: November 12 1982 (aged 88); Los Angeles, California
- Occupation: Child psychologist
- Relatives: Adelaide Johnson (aunt)

Helen Alathena Parkman Johnson Smith (February 8, 1894 – November 12, 1982) was an American child psychologist. She was an educator and chief psychologist at the John Tracy Clinic in Los Angeles from 1948 to 1977, working with the parents of deaf children to improve communication and other skills.

== Early life and education ==
Alathena Johnson was born in Chicago and raised in Evanston, Illinois, the daughter of Charles Lincoln Johnson and Helen Sylvester Woods Johnson. Sculptor and suffragist Adelaide Johnson was her aunt. She graduated from Wellesley College in 1915, and earned a master's degree at the University of Toronto. She completed her Ph.D. in 1960, at Ohio State University, at the age of 66, with a dissertation titled "Performance of Subjects aged Two to Four on Nonverbal Tasks Presented in Pantomime".

== Career ==
Johnson was a teacher in Ohio and worked at her father's bank in Texas as a young woman. From 1929 to 1948, she was a special education teacher and school psychologist in Shorewood, Wisconsin.

Smith was an educator at the John Tracy Clinic in Los Angeles from 1948 to 1977, and rose to be the clinic's chief psychologist. "When they ask me if I teach deaf children, I always say, 'No, I teach their parents'", she explained in 1969. She taught in the clinic's correspondence courses and summer programs, and traveled nationally and internationally giving lectures and holding workshops based on the clinic's oralism-based work. She was an adjunct assistant professor in the psychology department at the University of Southern California.

In 1972, Smith received the first Distinguished Alumna Award from the Los Angeles chapter of the Wellesley College Club. She was a life member of the American Psychological Association.

== Publications ==
- "Parent education and group therapy: An episode" (1948, with Fern McGrath)
- "Guidance at the John Tracy Clinic" (1956)
- Smith-Johnson Nonverbal Performance Scale (1977, with Ruth Harris Johnson)

== Personal life ==
Johnson married businessman William Bush Smith in 1918; they had two daughters, and divorced in 1933. In 1944, one of her daughters, also named Alathena, survived polio with paraplegia. In 1963, Smith was badly injured in a robbery in Marseilles. She recovered enough to resume her work, but experienced severe chronic hip pain for her last years. She died in 1982, at the age of 88, in Los Angeles.
