= Caroline B. Winslow =

American physician

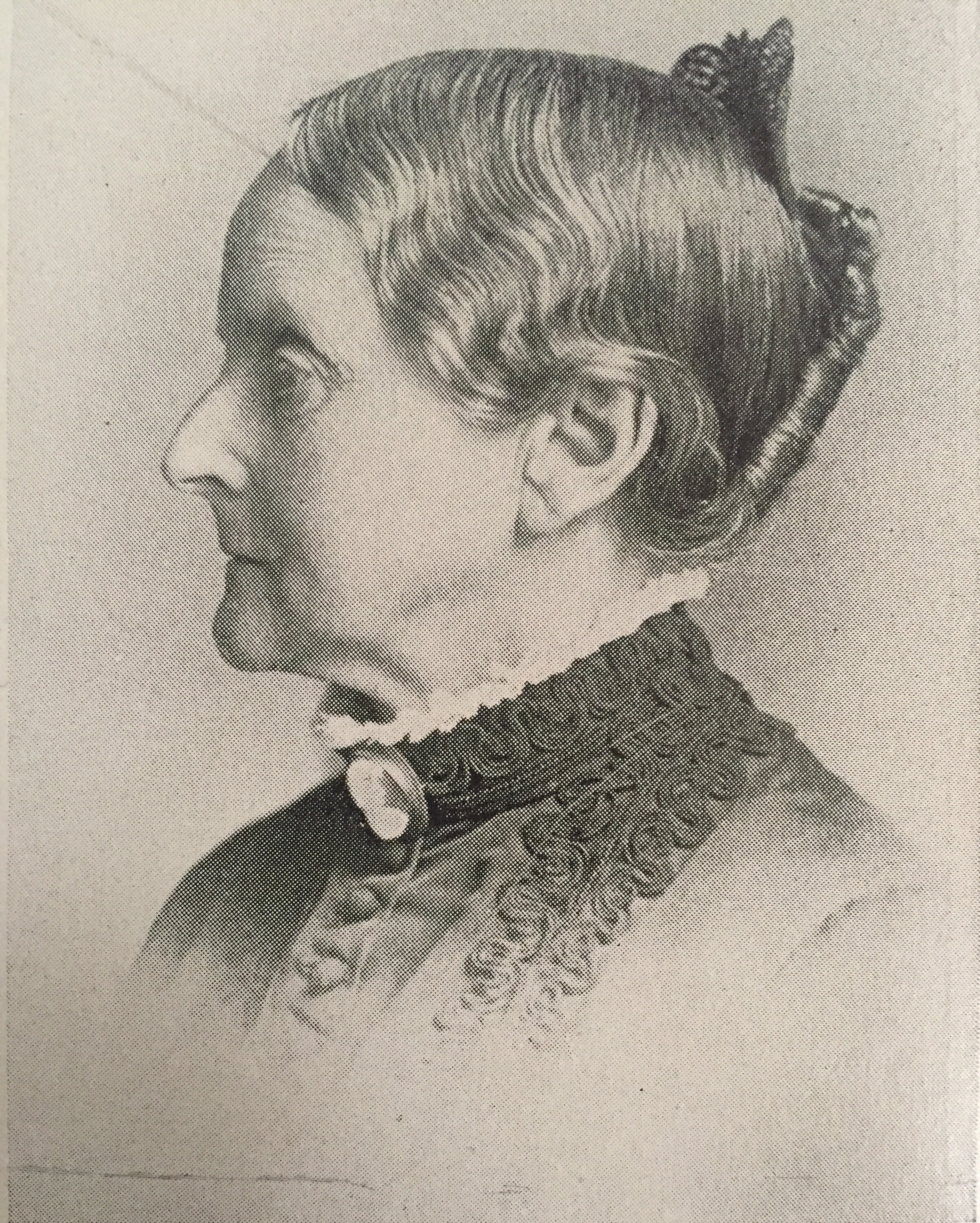
- Winslow from the 1893 book A Woman of the Century
- Born: Caroline Brown; November 19, 1822; Appledore, Kent, England
- Died: December 7, 1896 (aged 74); Washington, D.C., U.S.
- Resting place: Rock Creek Cemetery; Washington, D.C., U.S.
- Other names: Caroline Brown Winslow
- Occupation: Medical doctor
- Known for: Being the fifth woman in the United States to graduate in medicine

Caroline Brown Winslow (November 19, 1822 – December 7, 1896) was an American physician, and the fifth woman in the United States to graduate in medicine.

== Early life ==
Caroline Brown was born in Appledore, Kent, England, on November 19, 1822, the daughter of Samuel Brown (d. 1857). The family moved to the United States in 1826.

In 1850, she studied human anatomy under Rachel Brooks Gleason, M. D., at Glen Haven, New York and in December 1851, entered the Eclectic Medical College, in Cincinnati, Ohio, graduating in June 1853. She was the first woman to graduate from that college and the fifth woman in the United States to graduate with a degree in medicine.

== Career ==
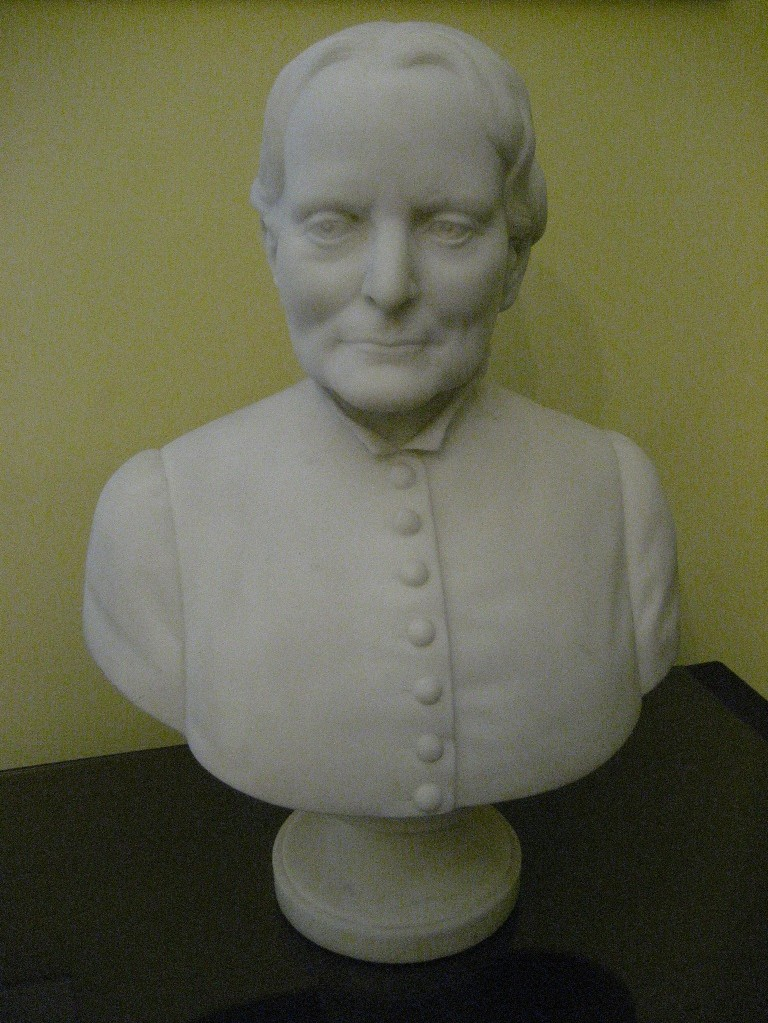
Caroline B. Winslow by Adelaide Johnson

Caroline B. Winslow practiced successfully in Cincinnati from 1853 to 1859 and having become interested in homeopathy, graduated in 1856 from the Western College of Homeopathy in Cleveland, Ohio. She then went to Utica, New York, the home of her parents, where she remained for more than seven years. In April 1864, after the death of her parents, she went to Washington, D. C., where she served as a regular visitor in military hospitals under the auspices of the New York State Agency. After the Civil War, she spent eight months in Baltimore, Maryland, before settling in Washington where she set up a homeopathy practice.

In November 1882, together with Susan Ann Edson, she opened the Homeopathic Free Dispensary, the first homeopathic pharmacy in Washington, which flourished for some years. It was the first facility where women doctors could practice side-by-side with their male colleagues.

She was president for fourteen years of the Moral Education Society of Washington. She edited the Alpha, the journal of that society, for thirteen years. She was a woman-suffragist and an advocate of higher education for all.

She was part of the Universal Franchise Association and together with Edson she planned the 1869 conference of the Universal Franchise Association.

In 1893 sculptor Adelaide Johnson made a bust of Caroline Brown Winslow which was exhibited in the Rotunda of the Woman's Building of the World's Columbian Exposition.

== Personal life ==
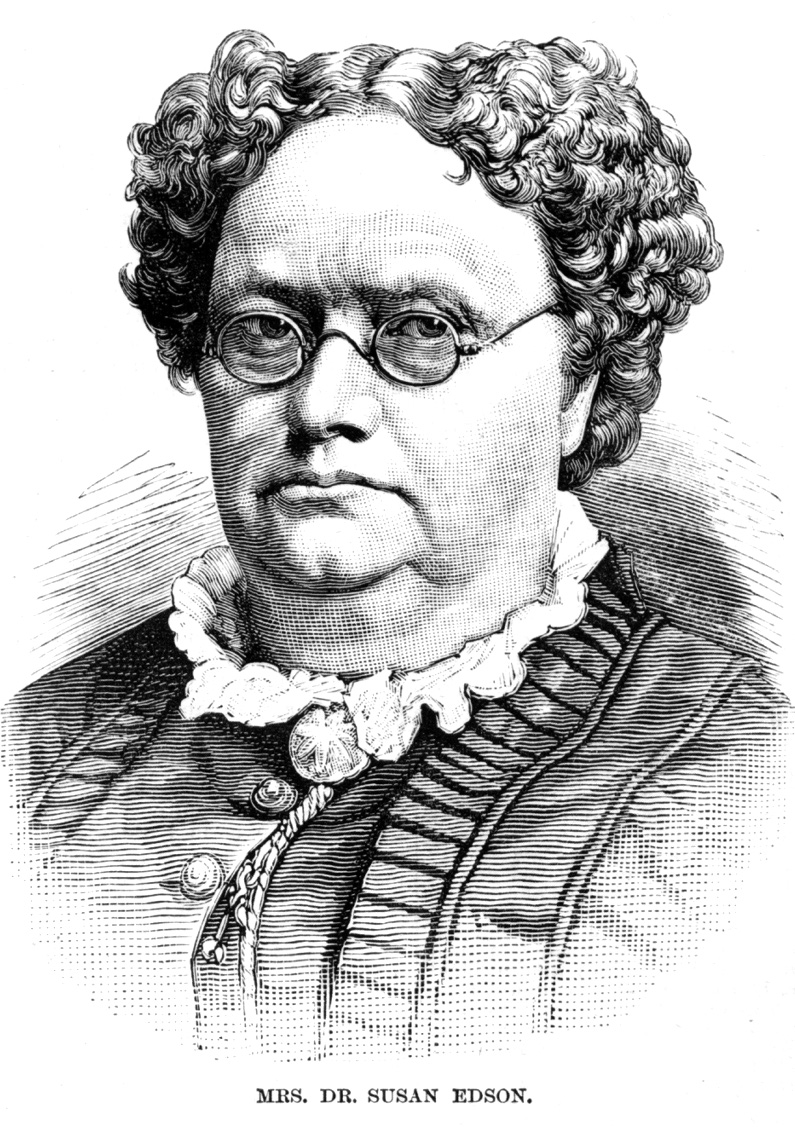
Susan Ann Edson 1823–1897

Caroline Brown married Austin Crosby Winslow, an artisan, on July 15, 1865, when Winslow was 43 years old.

Winslow was the lifelong friend of Susan Ann Edson. They probably met at Eclectic Medical College, which both attended. During the Civil War they worked as nurses, as they were not allowed to act as doctors. After the war, Winslow and Edson moved to Washington, D.C., together and established their own practices. Together they wrote a missive to the Congress, The Right of Women to Vote. Winslow adopted her niece, Mary Brown McPherson Janney (1853–1928), after the death of her sister.

Caroline B. Winslow died on December 7, 1896. Susan Ann Edson died one year later, in 1897. They are both buried at Rock Creek Cemetery, Washington.
