= Boys Will Be Boys (Miedzian book) =

1991 social sciences book by Myriam Miedzian

- 1st edition cover
- Author: Myriam Miedzian
- Subject: Psychology
- Genre: Non-fiction
- Publisher: Doubleday
- Publication date: 1991
- Pages: 337
- ISBN: 0-385-23932-7

Boys Will Be Boys: Breaking the Link between Masculinity and Violence is a 1991 social sciences book by American philosophy professor Myriam Miedzian that explores the roots of violent behaviour in American boys and men.

The book attracted national attention, prompting a three year speaking tour of the United States. Partly the interest was a result of the controversial nature of the contents, which some saw, in the words of the author, as "sexist towards men".

Academics provided mixed reviews.

== Publication ==
Boys Will Be Boys was written by American philosophy professor Myriam Miedzian and has 337 pages.

It was published in by Doubleday the US in June 1991, and then later republished in the United Kingdom. Anchor Press published the book again in 1992. A revised edition was published in 2002.

== Synopsis ==
Boys Will Be Boys states that violence perpetuated by older boys and men is a result of events in their early childhood, including a shortage of guidance from parents. In the book, Miedzian argues that societal norms in the United States drive boys, but not girls, towards violent behaviour. She frames the commonality of male violence mostly as a consequence of their environments, rather than inherently biological, although she notes that testosterone levels in some boys and a few girls, does contribute.

The book points out the normalisation of violence in sports, popular culture, and toys sold for boys and the reduced appreciation of athletics, dance, and other non-contact sports for boys in American culture. She points out differences in how girls are taught parenting and nurturing skills by both parents and teachers, while boys seldom are. She discuses American's comfort with the government regulation of alcohol consumption, vehicle driving, and privacy, but not parenting.

The book proposes solutions including deepening connections between fathers and their newborn children, and lessons on conflict resolution at school and in the home.

== Critical reception ==
The publication of Boys Will Be Boys provided Miedzian with immediate national attention, around 300 media interviews, including The Oprah Winfrey Show, Larry King Live, and the Charlie Rose talk show. Miedzian toured American radio and television studios and academic campuses for three years, later touring the United Kingdom once the book was published there. She was also invited to speak about her findings at the United States House Select Committee on Children, Youth, and Families.

The book proved controversial and was seen by some as "sexist against men" according reflections from the author in 2022. Reviews were published in Time magazine and in various newspaper opinion pieces.

Author and activist Arthur Waskow described the reflection on American culture as "urgent, important, and useful." Responding to the part of the book that linked poor parenting to violence, David Blankenhorn (founder of the Institute for American Values think tank) rejected the links between paternal masculinity and blamed violence on absent fathers. Feminist academic Lynne Segal wrote in the New Statesman that the book over-simplified the issues, and focussed too much on the responsibility of individuals rather than considering the impact of capitalism and consequences of American colonialism and imperialism.
