= Susan Ann Edson =

American physician

Dr. Susan Ann Edson
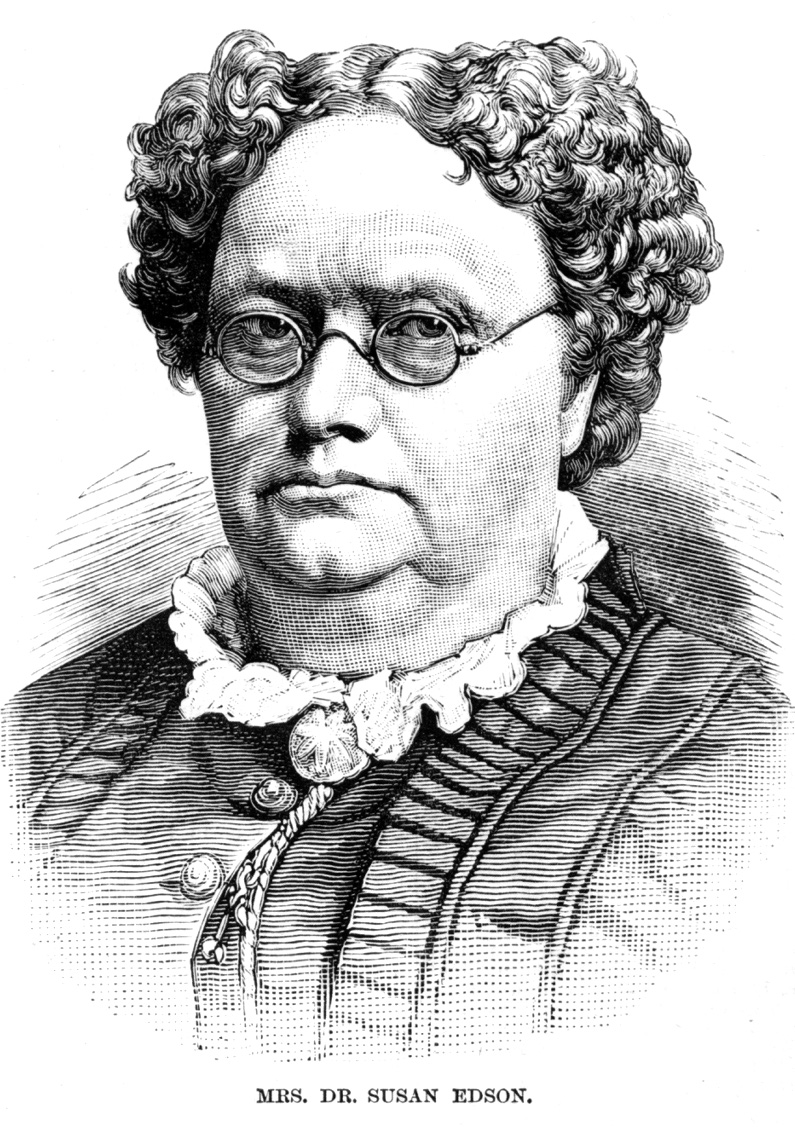
- Born: January 4, 1823; Fleming, New York, U.S.
- Died: November 13, 1897 (aged 74); Washington, D.C., U.S.
- Resting place: Rock Creek Cemetery; Washington, D.C., U.S.
- Education: Cleveland Homeopathic College, Eclectic College of Cincinnati
- Occupation: Medical doctor
- Known for: Personal physician to President James A. Garfield

Susan Ann Edson (January 4, 1823 – November 13, 1897) was one of the first women to attend medical school, served as a Civil War Army Nurse, and was a friend and personal physician to President James A. Garfield and his wife Lucretia.

== Early life and education ==
Susan Ann Edson was born January 4, 1823, in Fleming, New York. She was the daughter of John Joy Edson and Sarah E. Barnes.

Her sister Sarah Philena Edson (born 1818) married Sterne John Wheaton Underhill; after they divorced, Sarah retained custody of the children. Unusual for the time, Sarah retained her name and sued to have her children's last names changed to Edson. Sarah published a women's rights newspaper.

Susan Ann Edson attended two colleges, Eclectic College of Cincinnati and Cleveland Homeopathic College. She graduated from the Eclectic College of Cincinnati in 1853 and then proceeded to earn her additional degree from Cleveland on March 1, 1854. She was one of the first women to attend medical school. Accounts suggest she may have been the seventh woman in the United States to receive a medical degree.

== Career ==
After graduation, Dr. Edson opened a practice in either Cleveland or in her hometown in New York. When the American Civil War began, Edson joined the nursing corps, together with her sisters. She served in Washington, D.C. and also at Fort Monroe, a small Union outpost surrounded by Confederate territory.

Dr. Edson also served during the war at the Union Hotel Hospital in Winchester, Virginia. Edson improved sanitation and reduced the mortality rate significantly at the hospital.

Immediately after the war, Dr. Edson returned to her home in upstate New York and maintained a practice there. On May 23, 1872, she returned to Washington, D.C., where she remained for the rest of her life. In Washington, she ran a large practice, and it was said that she made so many house visits that she "wore out more horses and carriages than any other doctor in town." Edson specialized in treating illnesses of women.

== Personal life ==
Edson never married. She was lifelong friends with Caroline B. Winslow. They attended medical school together, served together during the Civil War, and both moved to Washington after the war. Winslow and Edson together worked for women's suffrage.

== Relationship with the Garfields ==
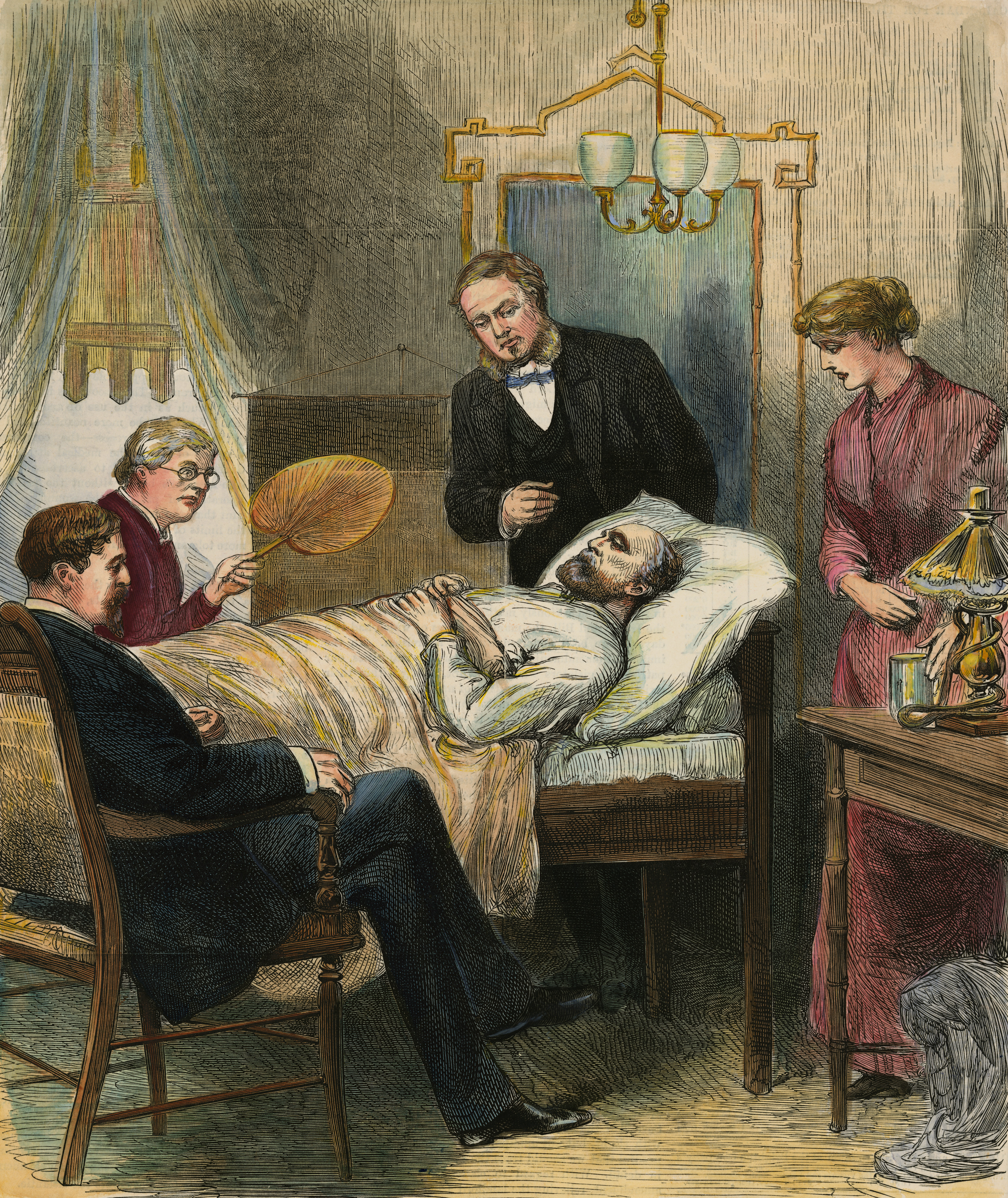
Dr. Edson fans President Garfield on his deathbed

Among Dr. Edson's patients in Washington was Neddy Garfield, son of then-Congressman James A. Garfield, who had fallen seriously ill. James and Lucretia Garfield grew close to Dr. Edson during this time, and shared their grief with her after Neddy's death.

Their professional relationship continued after Garfield's election as president in 1880. Lucretia was frail and required frequent medical attention. Edson became a familiar presence in the White House, as she cared for the First Lady during a bout of malaria in May 1881.

Just months later, in July 1881, President Garfield was shot by gunman Charles J. Guiteau. A team of physicians was called to help the president, led by Doctor Willard Bliss. Also called into assistance were Dr. Edson and a cousin of Garfield's, Dr. Silas A. Boynton. Edson was by Garfield's side more than any other physician with encouragement from Lucretia and the children who referred to Edson as, "Dr. Edson, full of Med'cin!" Although Lucretia insisted that Edson be by Garfield's side, Edson was limited by Bliss. Within a three-month period of medical treatment to Garfield, Bliss reportedly did not take Edson's advice one time. Included in this advice was both Edson's and Boynton's opinions on the improper treatment of Garfield in regard to his preexisting conditions. Both Edson and Boynton, from being close with Garfield, had knowledge about his previous stomach complications which were blatantly ignored by Bliss, causing further risk to Garfield and a continuation of treatment methods that were considered more dangerous given the President's state. As Garfield's state was worsening and Bliss repeatedly resorted to inefficient treatment and held a constant dismissive attitude towards Edson, Edson left Elberon, New Jersey. The remaining physicians, including Boynton and Bliss, worked with Garfield until his eventual death in September, 1881.

Following Garfields' death, the team of physicians, including Edson, Boynton, and Bliss, sent in a compensation demand to Congress for their medical services to the President. Edson and Boynton were able to receive portions of the distribution at Mrs. Garfield's request. Initially, Bliss demanded $25,000, Edson $10,000, and Boynton $4,500. Due to Bliss's controversial treatment of the President, Congress disapproved the demand, resulting in Bliss receiving only $6,500 and Edson receiving only $3,000. For the same services, the 6 male physicians that worked alongside Edson all received, with the exception of Boynton, over double what Edson received.

== Death and burial ==
Susan Edson died on November 13, 1897, "caused by an affection of the heart." Obituaries published at the time of her death called her "one of the best-known physicians in the United States." She was buried at Rock Creek Cemetery on November 14.
