= Myriam Miedzian =

American philosopher

- Born: Myriam Miedzianogora
- Education: Columbia University; Hunter College, City University of New York
- Occupations: Academic and author
- Employer(s): Rutgers University, Barnard College, Brooklyn College
- Notable work: Boys Will Be Boys (1991 book)
- Website: myriammiedzian.com

Myriam Miedzian (born Myriam Miedzianogora) is an American philosopher, author, and social activist. She is the founder of non-profit organizations, including Monumental Women and Prepare Tomorrow's Parents.

She is the author of the 1991 book Boys Will Be Boys.

== Education ==
In 1940, as a child, Miedzian had to escape Nazis.

Miedzian has a master's degree in clinical social work from Hunter College, City University of New York and a PhD in philosophy from Columbia University.

== Career ==
Miedzian's career as a philosophy professor included teaching as Rutgers University, Barnard College, and Brooklyn College.

Miedzian and her husband, Gary Ferdman, founded Monumental Women, a non-profit organization dedicated to placing the first statue honoring women in New York City's Central Park. Its efforts were successful and the statue, which honors Sojourner Truth, Susan B. Anthony, and Elizabeth Cady Stanton, was unveiled, after seven years, in August 2020. Miedzian is also a founding director of Prepare Tomorrow's Parents, a non-profit organization that works to promote child-rearing education in public schools.

Miedzian has been a guest speaker on over 300 television and radio programs, and has testified before the U.S. House of Representatives Select Committee on Children, Youth, and Families. She is a writer of articles, opinion pieces, and blogs. She has delivered lectures on reducing violence through changes in the socialization of boys at international events and academic institutions, including at the International Psychohistory Conferences and the Mississauga/Dufferin-Peel Lecture, in Ontario, Canada.

== Selected publications ==
- Boys Will Be Boys: Breaking the Link Between Masculinity and Violence (Doubleday 1991, Anchor 1992, revised edition Lantern Books 2002) ISBN 978-0385239325
- Generations: A Century of Women Speak About Their Lives *co-authored with daughter Alisa Malinovich. (Grove Atlantic 1995, Kindle 2013) ISBN 978-0871136787
- He Walked Through Walls: A Twentieth Century Tale of Survival (Lantern Books, 2009) ISBN 978-1590561492

== Anthologies ==
- "Rethinking Peace" (Lynne Rienner, 1994)
- "Ending The Cycle of Violence" (Sage, 1994)
- "Transforming a Rape Culture" (Milkweed, 2004)
- "Violence and Gender" (Prentice Hall, 2004)
- "Motherhood and Feminism" (Seal Press, 2010)
- "New Girl Order: Are Men in Decline?" (Cato Unbound, 2012)
- "Transforming Terror" (University of California, 2011)
- "Marxism, Revolution, and Utopia Vol. 6" (University of California, 2014)
