= Statue of Elizabeth Cady Stanton =

Statue in Johnstown, New York, U.S.

- Year: 2021
- Medium: Bronze sculpture
- Subject: Elizabeth Cady Stanton
- Location: Johnstown, New York, U.S.; 43°0′23.9″N 74°22′24.7″W

A bronze sculpture of Elizabeth Cady Stanton was installed in Johnstown's Sir William Johnson Park, in the U.S. state of New York, in 2021.

== See also ==
- Portrait Monument, 1920 sculpture, U.S. Capitol rotunda, Washington, D.C.
- Women's Rights Pioneers Monument, 2020 statue in New York City
- List of monuments and memorials to women's suffrage
