= Adelaide Johnson =

American sculptor and suffragist (1859–1955)

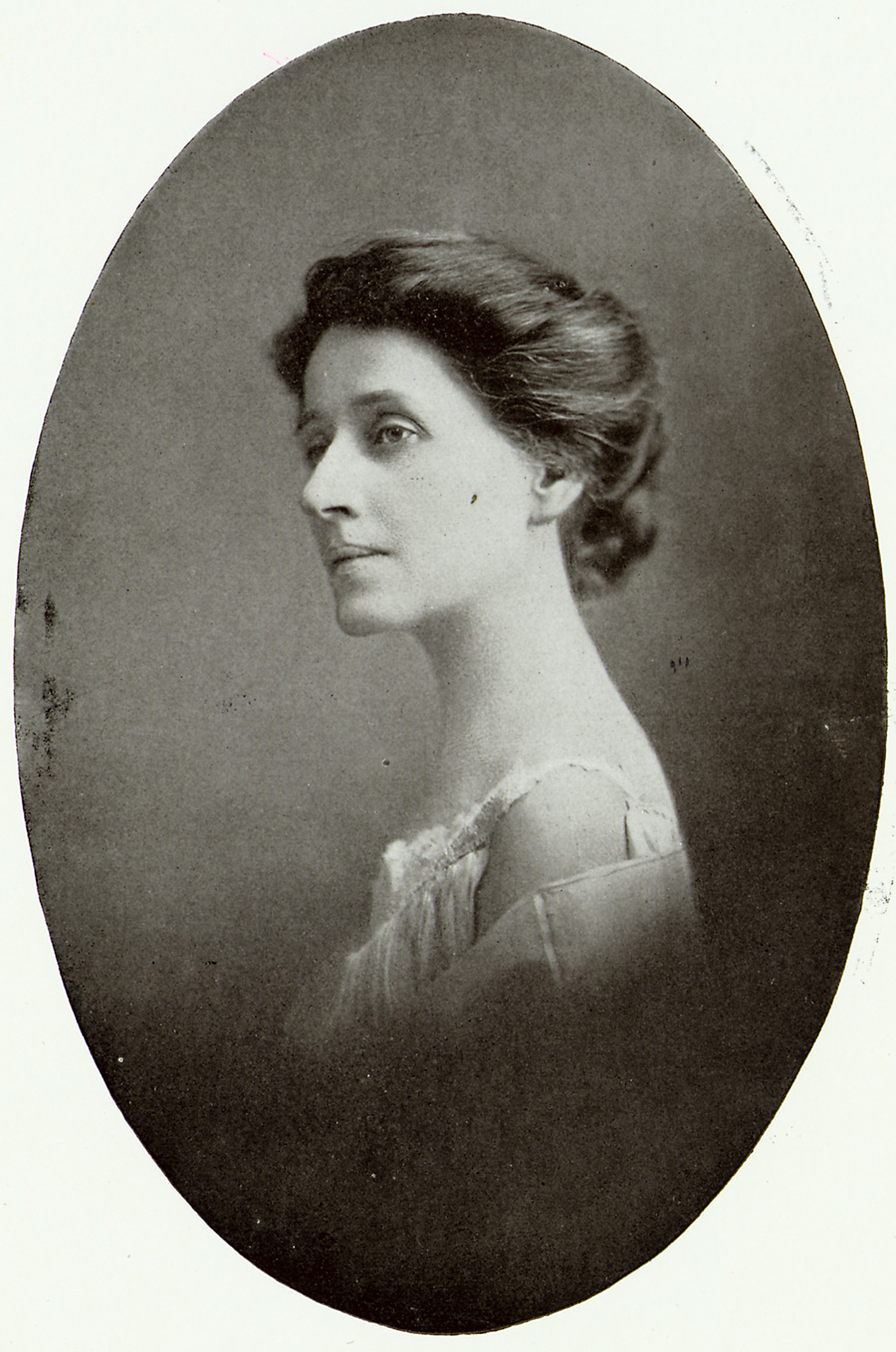
- Born: Sarah Adeline Johnson; September 26, 1859; Plymouth, Illinois
- Died: November 10, 1955 (aged 96); Washington, DC
- Education: St. Louis School of Design, Giulio Monteverde
- Known for: Sculpture
- Notable work: Portrait Monument to Lucretia Mott, Elizabeth Cady Stanton, and Susan B. Anthony, U.S. Capitol
- Spouse: Frederick Jenkins (m. 1896–1908)

Adelaide Johnson (1859–1955) was an American sculptor whose work is displayed in the U.S. Capitol and a feminist who was devoted to the cause of equality of women. She was known as the "sculptor of the women's movement".

== Biography ==
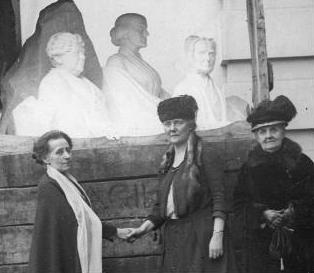
Johnson (left) at the unveiling of the Portrait Monument to Lucretia Mott, Elizabeth Cady Stanton, and Susan B. Anthony in 1921.

Born Sarah Adeline Johnson to a farm family of modest means in Plymouth, Illinois, she attended rural school and then took classes at the St. Louis School of Design. In 1878, she changed from Sarah Adeline to Adelaide, a name she thought was more dramatic. She moved to Chicago and supported herself with her art. In January 1882, hurrying to get to her studio, she slipped and fell twenty feet down the well of an unguarded elevator shaft. Badly hurt, she sued for compensation and was awarded the sum of $15,000. This injury and award gave her the financial freedom to travel to Europe to study painting and sculpture, an opportunity she would never have had without the accident. She took the opportunity to study in Dresden and Rome, studying with Giulio Monteverde in Rome where she kept a studio until 1920.

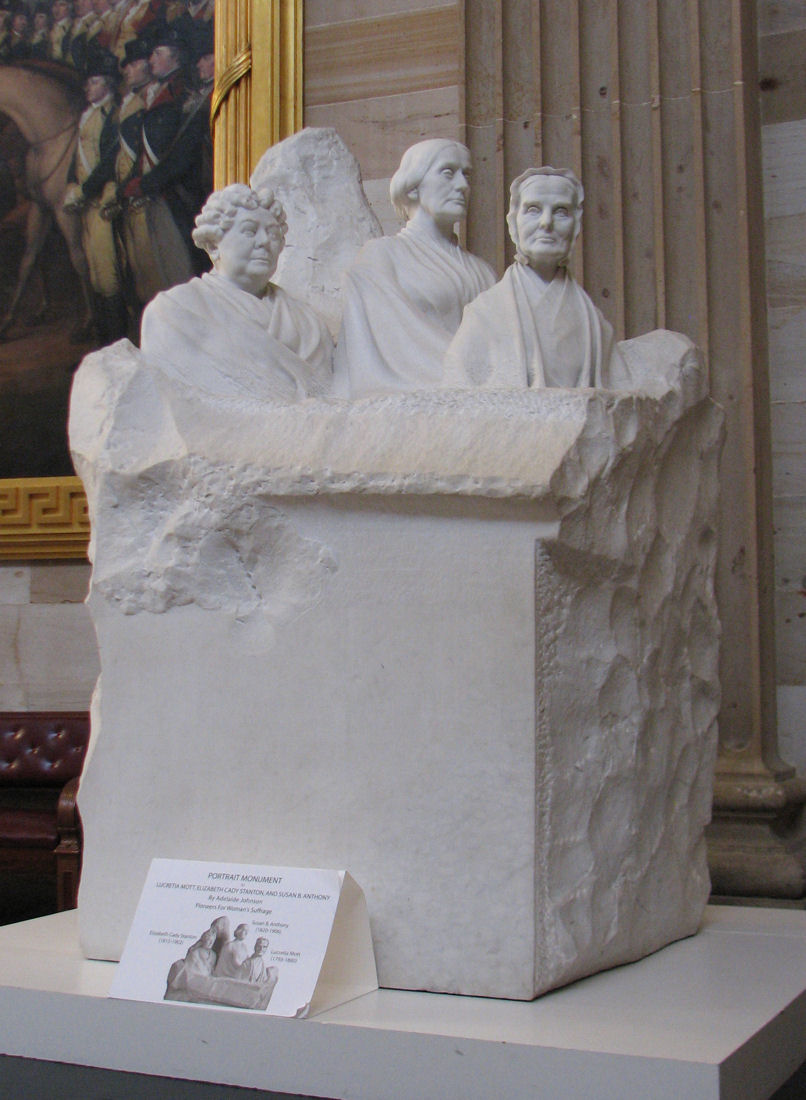
The Portrait Monument statue located in the United States Capitol rotunda. The Portrait Monument represents three women involved in the Women's Suffrage Movement, Elizabeth Cady Stanton, Susan B. Anthony, and Lucretia Mott

Johnson exhibited her work, The Portrait Monument and a bust of Caroline B. Winslow at The Woman's Building at the 1893 World's Columbian Exposition in Chicago, Illinois. The high point of her professional career was to complete a monument in Washington D.C. in honor of the women's suffrage movement. Alva Belmont helped to secure funding for the piece, Portrait Monument to Lucretia Mott, Elizabeth Cady Stanton, and Susan B. Anthony, which was unveiled in 1921. This piece was originally kept on display in the crypt of the US Capitol, but was moved to its current location and more prominently displayed in the rotunda in 1997.

In 1896 she married Frederick Jenkins, a British businessman and fellow vegetarian who was eleven years younger than she. He took her family name of Johnson as "the tribute love pays to genius." They were wed by a woman minister, and her bridesmaids were the busts she had sculpted of Susan B. Anthony and Elizabeth Cady Stanton. The marriage ended after twelve years.

Her career declined after the 1930s, and financial problems beset her. She relied on others for financial support and was often unwilling to sell her sculptures because she felt the prices offered did not recognize her work. Faced with eviction for failure to pay taxes, in 1939 she invited the press to witness her mutilating her own sculptures as a protest against her circumstances, and against the failure to realize her dream of a studio-museum commemorating suffragists and other women's campaigners. She moved in with friends in 1947 and appeared on TV quiz programs trying to win money to buy back her home. Her flamboyant nature led her to lie about her age through her life. She celebrated her 100th birthday at the age of 88, realizing that it made good publicity. Upon her death, her age was reported to be 108, though she was 96. She is buried in Washington, D.C. at Congressional Cemetery.

== Personal life ==
Johnson became a vegetarian in her youth. She was vegetarian because she believed it was morally wrong to take the life of any living creature. In 1893, Johnson was a speaker at the third International Vegetarian Congress in Chicago.

Johnson did not embrace a particular religion but took interest in Christian Science, spiritualism and Theosophy. She was a member of the National Spiritualist Association of Churches. Her niece, Alathena Johnson Smith, became a noted child psychologist.
