= Skop =

Skop may refer to:

- Skop (food), or inyama yenhloko, an African dish made of cow, goat, or sheep's head
- Skop (village), a village in Warmian-Masurian Voivodeship, Poland
- Skop (Dr. Slump), a character in the manga Dr. Slump
- Ingrid Skop, American ob-gyn and anti-abortion activist
- Marko Škop (born 1974), Slovak film director
- Säästöpankkien Keskus-Osake-Pankki, a defunct Finnish bank

== See also ==
- Scop (disambiguation)
