= Charlotte Denman Lozier =

American physician

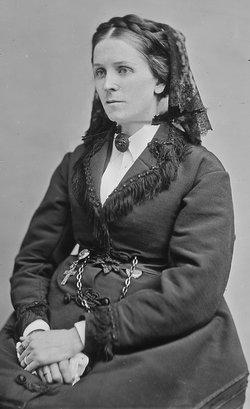
- Dr. Charlotte Denman Lozier
- Born: Charlotte Denman; March 15, 1844; Milburn, New Jersey
- Died: January 3, 1870 (aged 25)
- Education: New York Medical College for Women
- Occupations: Physician, Suffragist
- Spouse: Abraham Witton Lozier (m. 1866)

Charlotte Denman Lozier (March 15, 1844 – January 3, 1870) was one of the first female medical doctors in the United States. She worked as a professor, a feminist campaigning for women's rights, and as a homeopathic physician. She was also a mother to three and spent much of her early childhood traveling around the United States with her family.

== Early life ==
She was the daughter of Selina and Jacob Denman. Lozier was the oldest of five. Lozier was born in Milburn, New Jersey, in the Eastern United States. The Denman family travelled to Napoleon, Michigan in 1850 and later to Galena, Illinois in hopes of exploring the frontier. The Denman family finally travelled west to Winona, Minnesota in 1852. Charlotte's mother, Selina Denman, died when Charlotte Denman Lozier was in her teens, and Charlotte became a caretaker for her family. Charlotte contributed to her family by teaching.

== Education ==
In 1864, Charlotte Denman Lozier, 20 years of age, moved back east to New York to pursue a medical degree. Charlotte began her medical career by entering the New York Medical College for Women. New York Medical College for Women was the first medical school for women in the state of New York and opened the year before she entered the school. New York Medical College for Women was founded by her mother-in-law, Dr. Clemence Sophia Harned Lozier.

== Early adulthood ==
Charlotte Denman Lozier finished medical school in 1867 and soon became a professor of physiology and hygiene for New York Medical College for Women. While working as a professor, Charlotte also presented many lectures on women's rights.

She married the son of Dr. Clemence Lozier, Dr. Abraham Witton Lozier on January 20, 1866, in Ft. Wayne, Indiana. The two remained in Winona for some time before returning to New York where Charlotte then became the Vice President of the National Working Women's Association. As a feminist, she campaigned for Women's Suffrage and the Working Women's Association as well as other progressive and charitable organizations.

Charlotte Denman Lozier and Abraham Lozier had three children. The first born was a boy, Clement Abraham on November 7, 1866. Clement Abraham died at the age of 21. The next to be born was another boy, Robert Ten Eyck, in May 1868 in Connecticut while Dr. Charlotte Denman Lozier was on her way home from a lecture. The last to be born was a girl, Jessie Charlotte, born on January 1, 1870. Jessie Charlotte married Harry S. Payne on January 15, 1896. Jessie and Harry Payne had one son born on July 3, 1898, named Robert Lozier Payne.

== Career ==
Lozier worked as a physician, lecturer, and belonged to Sorosis, which in Latin means sisterhood. Sorosis was a professional women's club, which sought to support women involved in various fields of work.

Lozier also served as the first Vice President of the National Working Women's Association. The Working Women's Association was created in 1868 and was formed to protect the rights of women, including better labor conditions for women of all classes.

In the late 1860s, Charlotte Denman Lozier defended Hester Vaughn, a woman accused of killing her newborn. Lozier was also well known for defending women such as Caroline Fuller, a young woman whose sexual partner was urging for an abortion.

== Last years of life ==
In 1869, Charlotte was pregnant with her third child. On New Year's Eve, Charlotte was on a ladder hanging a curtain when she became light-headed and fell off of the ladder. Charlotte Denman Lozier was taken to the hospital where her third and final child was born two months prematurely. However, Charlotte died at age 25 on January 3, 1870.

Lozier died from health complications surrounding the pregnancy and birth of her third child, who was born several days before she died. She was survived by this child, her two previous children, and her husband.

== Notes ==
The Charlotte Lozier Institute, an anti-abortion think tank affiliated with Susan B. Anthony Pro-Life America, is named after Lozier.

== Sources ==
- Hume, Janice (2000). Obituaries in American Culture. University Press of Mississippi. p. 82. ISBN 9781578062423.
- Obituary, Herald of Health
- Obituary, New York Times
