= Juan Esteban Pérez Daza =

Chilean artist

Juan Esteban Pérez Daza, who signs his works as Esteban, J. Esteban, or Esteban Pérez, is a painter and visual artist. He was born in Santiago, Chile, on November 15, 1939. He studied at the University of Chile's School of Applied Arts and graduated in 1963. In 1965, he moved to New York, and from 1969 to 1971, he taught enameling workshops at Riverside Church. Pérez uses enamel on steel to create compositions that illuminate the beauty of color and light.

== Awards and distinctions ==
- 1963 Second Prize in Painting, Art & Technique Exhibition, Santiago, Chile
- 1969 Second Prize in Crafts, Westchester Art Society, Westchester, United States
- 1970 Acquisition Prize, Everson Museum of Art, Syracuse, United States
- 1982 Enamel Today Award of Merit from Enamel Guild, The Northwest Craft Center, Seattle, United States
- 1991 Contest for a mural in Port Authority Bus Terminal, New York City, United States

== Works in public and academic collections ==
=== Museo Nacional de Bellas Artes, Santiago, Chile ===
- Fantasía Nocturna, enamel on metal, 42 × 42 cm
- Alborada Rosa, enamel on metal, 42 × 42 cm

=== Consulate of the Republic of Chile, Washington, D.C., United States ===
- Untitled, enamel on metal, 50 × 50 cm
- Untitled, enamel on metal, 50 × 50 cm

=== Everson Museum of Art, Syracuse, United States ===
- Space Path, enamel, 42 × 42 cm

=== Port Authority Bus Terminal, New York City, United States ===
- Constructivist Space Drawing, mural-wall sculpture, porcelain enamel on steel, 32 feet × 8 feet × 4 inches

=== Yale University Art Gallery, New Haven, United States ===
- Flying Experiment, enamel on copper, 20 × 20 cm

== Exhibitions ==
- 1969 Metarco Galleries, New York City, United States
- 1970 Everson Museum of Art, Syracuse, United States
- 1974, 1976 Knoll International, Washington, D.C., United States
- 1976 Taller Guayasamín, Caracas, Venezuela
- 1977 Sala de Exhibiciones Skriba, Santiago, Chile
- 1979 Centro Bellas Artes, Maracaibo, Venezuela
- 1980 Sutton Gallery, New York City, United States
- 1985, 1986, 1987 Pierre Antoine Gallery, Washington, D.C., United States
- 1991 Cucalon Gallery, International Art Exposition, Miami, United States
