= Skopo =

Skopo may refer to:

- Skopo (food), an African dish of meat made from cow, goat, or sheep's head
- Skopo, Sežana, a village in Slovenia
