= Working Women's Association =

Former trade union of the United States

The Working Women's Association (WWA) was formed in New York City on September 17, 1868 in the offices of The Revolution, a women's rights newspaper established earlier that year by Elizabeth Cady Stanton and Susan B. Anthony. Its stated purpose was to create "an association of working-women which might act for the interests of its members, in the same manner as the associations of workingmen now regulate the wages, etc., of those belonging to them." Shortly afterwards Anthony was seated as a delegate of the WWA at the annual congress of the National Labor Union (NLU), the first national labor federation in the U.S.

The WWA's membership grew to include over a hundred wage-earning women in addition to journalists and other women whose work was more intellectual than manual. Concentrated in the printing industry in its early days, WWA members included women who were or had been employed in printing shops (and their female employers in some cases) and also self-employed printers. Its officers, again mainly printers, were: President, Mrs. Anna Tobbitt; Vice Presidents, Susie Johns, Augusta Lewis, Emily Peers; Secretary, Elizabeth Brown; Treasurer, Julia Brown.

The new organization rejected Stanton's proposal to name itself the Working Women's Suffrage Association, and it decided not to campaign for women's suffrage until it was more solidly established as an organization. The organization drew the attention of the press, including the New York Times, which ran an editorial ridiculing the WWA for demanding equal pay for equal work, arguing that women's willingness to work for less gave them an advantage in the labor market.

== Trade unions ==
The WWA assisted several of its members in the creation of the Women's Typographical Union. That attracted the interest of the National Typographical Union, which traditionally had refused to admit women as members. It now agreed to accept the newly formed Women's Typographical Union as an affiliate, becoming the second national union (after the cigar makers) to admit female members.

When a printers' strike broke out in 1869, members of the Women's Typographical Union cooperated fully with the strike. Anthony, on the other hand, voiced support for a company-run training program for women printers that would have the effect of enabling them to replace striking male printers. From Anthony's point of view, she was simply promoting increased job opportunities for women, one of her declared intentions. From the union's point of view, her action amounted to support for strikebreaking. Anthony later apologized for her actions, but the damage was done. At the NLU congress in 1869, Anthony was first seated as a delegate but then unseated the next day after intense debate.

As the female union printers began to work more closely with their male counterparts, their ties with the WWA weakened. Without those ties, however, their position within the union weakened, and they were soon protesting that they were once again being shut out of the industry.

The WWA also tried to create a Sewing Machine Operators Union, but this attempt failed, partly because of the difficulty of unionizing semi-skilled workers at that time. Male workers in that industry were not unionized either. The WWA also made attempts to organize co-operative shops for female printing workers and sewing machine workers who were excluded from male-only commercial shops.

The WWA played a leading role, along with The Revolution, in the campaign to win the release of Hester Vaughn, a domestic worker who had been found guilty of infanticide and sentenced to death. Charging that the social and legal systems treated women unfairly, the WWA petitioned, organized a rally in New York, and sent delegations to visit Vaughn in prison and to speak with the governor. Vaughn was eventually pardoned.

The Hester Vaughn campaign attracted middle class women to the WWA at the same time that wage-earning women were losing interest in it. By 1869 the membership was made up almost entirely of middle class working women, including journalists, doctors and other professionals. When Anthony and Stanton formed the National Woman Suffrage Association (NWSA) in 1869, its New York City section was composed largely of WWA members, who continued to meet and engage in much the same work as before but now as members of the NWSA. The WWA disbanded in December 1869, shortly after Sarah F. Norton became its president, and not long after the NWSA was formed.

== Bibliography ==
- DuBois, Ellen Carol (1978). Feminism and Suffrage: The Emergence of an Independent Women's Movement in America, 1848-1869. Ithaca, NY: Cornell University Press. ISBN 0-8014-8641-6.
- Flexner, Eleanor (1959). Century of Struggle. Cambridge, MA: Belknap Press of Harvard University Press. ISBN 978-0674106536.
- Balser, Diane (1987). Sisterhood & Solidarity: Feminism and Labor in Modern Times, Chapter 5, "Working Women's Association of 1868." Boston: South End Press. ISBN 0-89608-278-4.
