= George Fisk Comfort =

American art historian

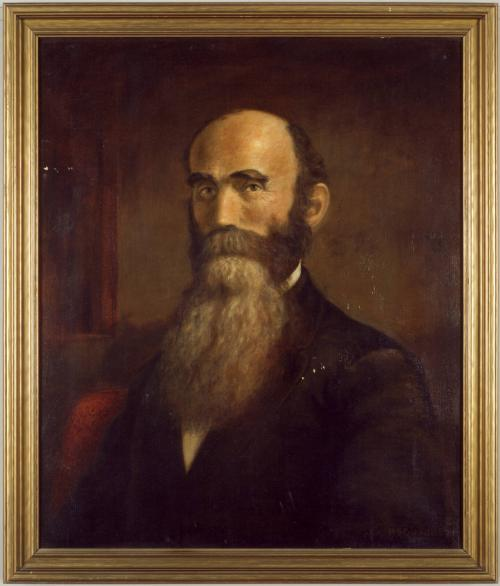
- Portrait of George Fisk Comfort by Hiram S. Gutsell (1885)
- Born: September 20, 1833; Berkshire, New York, U.S.
- Died: May 5, 1910 (aged 76); Montclair, New Jersey, U.S.
- Occupation(s): Art scholar and exponent
- Spouse: Anna Manning Comfort (m. 1871)

George Fisk Comfort (September 20, 1833 – May 5, 1910) was a 19th-century American scholar and art exponent, and founder of both the Metropolitan Museum of Art, NY, and Everson Museum of Art, Syracuse, NY.

== Biography ==
Comfort was born in Berkshire, New York. He graduated from Wesleyan University in Middletown, CT with an A.B. degree (in classics) in 1857 and an A.M. degree in 1860. After completing his studies at Wesleyan, he traveled to Europe to study art history and archaeology where he stayed until 1865. In Berlin, Comfort was influenced by meetings and studies with the philosopher Friedrich Kaulbach, Carl Richard Lepsius (curator of Egyptology at the Berlin Museum), Gemäldegalerie director Gustav Waagen, Leopold von Ranke, among others. From 1865 to 1868, he served as professor of languages at Allegheny College, Meadville, Pennsylvania.

Comfort helped found the American Philological Association, whose first meeting he organized in Poughkeepsie, New York in 1869. In the same year, he was also a prime mover in New York City for the foundation of the Metropolitan Museum of Art. The following year Comfort published his Art Museums in America, a book outlining his vision for museums and museum education in the United States. His other publishing credits include a series of textbooks for the German language. His papers are held at Syracuse University and the Archives of American Art. Comfort remained on the board of the Metropolitan Museum of Art until 1872.

In 1872, he was appointed professor of aesthetics and modern languages at the newly founded Syracuse University. He was instrumental in founding the College of Fine Arts at Syracuse University in 1873. In 1891, he was elected the president of the Southern College of Fine Arts in LaPorte, Texas. In 1896, he founded the Everson Museum of Art at Syracuse, holding its first exhibition in 1900. Under Comfort's leadership, the museum developed the first regular educational program in a museum in America.

Comfort's outline for art museums in the United States became the principal vision, based on the German model, for museums and museum education. His facility in the German language directly transported those ideas to the United States. His famous Union League Club address espoused an art museum for New York that "represent[ed] the History of Art in all countries and in all ages of art both pure and applied."

Comfort died at the home of his son in Montclair, New Jersey in 1910. He was buried in the Oakwood Cemetery next to Syracuse University.
