= Anna Manning Comfort =

American doctor of medicine (1845–1931)

Anna Manning Comfort M.D.
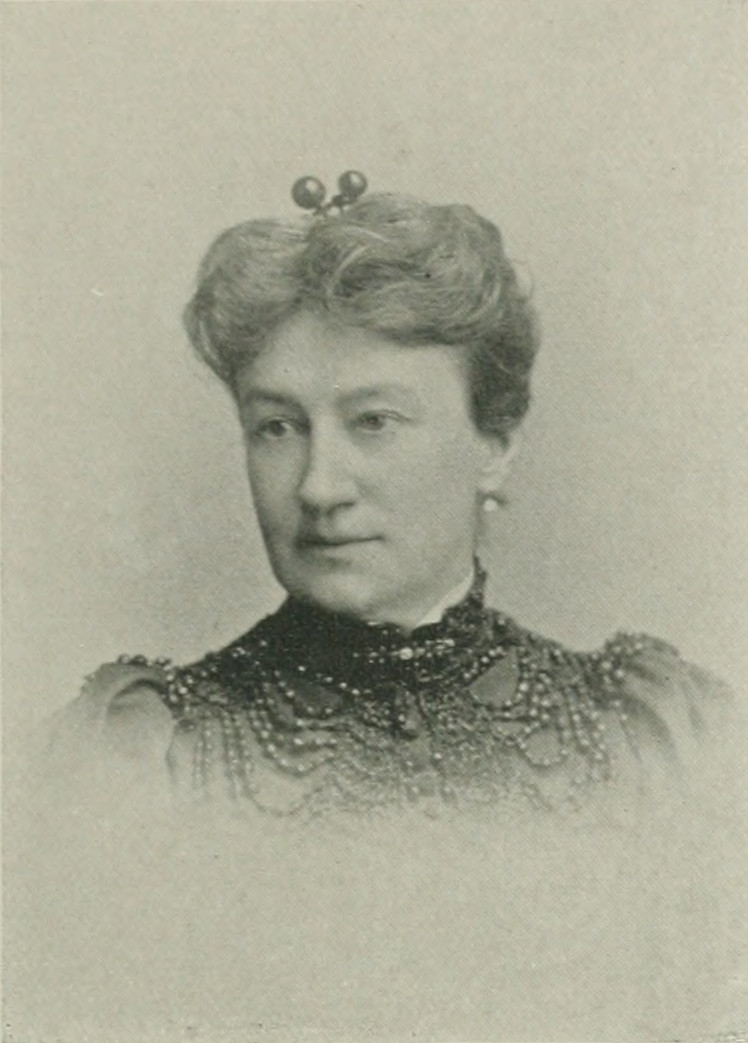
- "A Woman of the Century"
- Born: Anna Manning; January 19, 1845; Trenton, New Jersey, U.S.
- Died: January 12, 1931 (aged 85); New York, U.S.
- Education: New York Medical College and Hospital for Women
- Occupation: Gynecologist
- Notable work: Women's Education and Women's Health: Chiefly in Reply to "Sex in Education"
- Spouse: George Fisk Comfort (m. 1871; died 1910)
- Relatives: Dr. Clemence Sophia Harned Lozier (aunt)

Signature
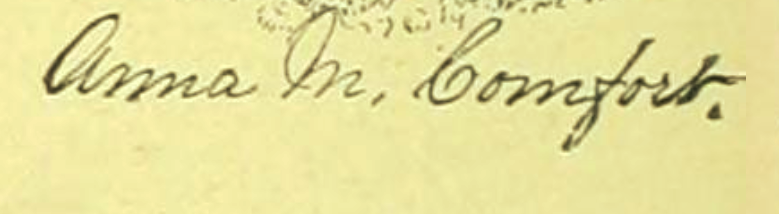

Anna Manning Comfort, M.D. (née Manning; January 19, 1845 – January 12, 1931) was an American physician who specialized in the treatment of women's diseases. She was the first woman medical graduate to practice in the state of Connecticut.

Comfort was also an activist and vocal opponent of American imperialism. She was a leader in the women's suffrage movement, as well as a social reformer who defended the rights of Native Americans and African Americans. A member of Sorosis since 1878, Comfort was also a pioneer clubwoman.

== Early life and education ==
=== Childhood ===
Anna Manning was born in Trenton, New Jersey, January 19, 1845. Her father was Alfred Curling Manning. She was a descendant of Joseph Manning, a brother of James Manning, who was the founder and first president of Brown University. They came to the United States from England late in the 17th-century. Comfort's mother was Elizabeth (Price) Manning, who came of a Philadelphia Quaker family. Comfort was of English and French descent.

As a child, Comfort moved with her family to Boston, Massachusetts, where she received an academic education. There, her father directed her into a special study of the piano, which she continued after returning to New York. By the age of sixteen, she was recognized as an unusually talented performer.

=== Medical Education ===
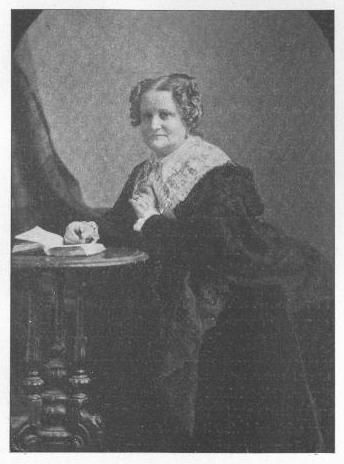
Dr. Clemence Sophia Harned Lozier

Comfort's aunt, physician Clemence Sophia Harned Lozier, M.D., discovered and encouraged Comfort's aptitude for medical study. In Lozier’s home, Comfort read many books on medicine; friends began to notice that her music was overstrewn with medical pamphlets.

During the early American Civil War, Alfred Manning began experiencing financial difficulties, and he gave Comfort a week to decide whether to move with her family to New England, or to remain in New York to study medicine at Lozier's school. He gave her a week to decide. Lozier, seeing Comfort's distress and indecision, reportedly told Comfort, “You are just the type and character to make a splendid physician, Anna. Enter the first class, and tell your father that you are going to live with me while you are taking the course."

At the age of 17, Comfort entered Lozier's office as a student. Lozier's hospitality brought to her house many of the leading reformers of the time, and from discussions with them, Comfort drew much of that sympathetic inspiration and breadth of view which marked her personality in later years. During the Civil War period, Comfort actively pioneered the "Woman’s Rights Movement".

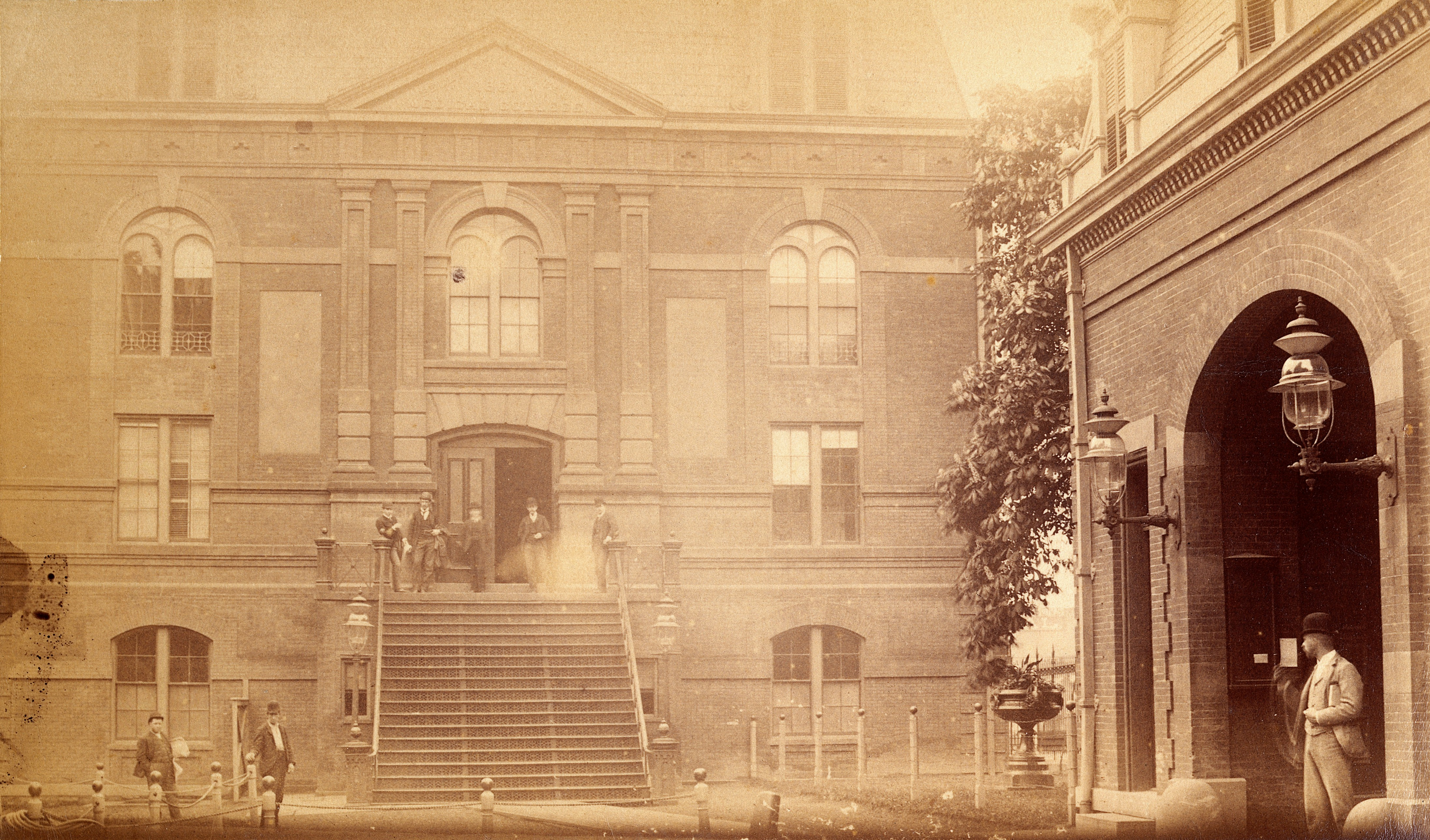
Bellevue Hospital

Comfort was a member of the first class in the New York Medical College for Women. Comfort and her fellow female students experienced rude treatment they received from some male students and professors while attending the clinics in Bellevue Hospital. Comfort described the prejudice she experienced:

"We had to go to Bellevue Hospital for our practical work, and the indignities we were made to suffer are beyond belief. There were five hundred young men students taking post-graduate courses, and we were jeered at and catcalled, and the 'old war horses', the doctors, joined the younger men. We were considered aggressive. They said women did not have the same brains as men and were not trustworthy. All the work at the hospital was made as repulsively unpleasant for us as possible. There were originally six in the class, but all but two were unable to put up with the treatment to which we were subjected and dropped out. I trembled whenever I went to the hospital, and I said once that I could not bear it. Finally, the women went to the authorities, who said that if we were not respectfully treated, they would take the charter from the hospital."

In 1865, at the graduating exercises of that class, speeches were made by Henry Ward Beecher, Horace Greeley, Henry Jarvis Raymond, and Hon. S. S. Cox in behalf of enlarging the sphere of woman's activities, and especially on women entering the field of medicine.

== Career ==
=== Connecticut ===
Because her family lived in Norwich, Connecticut, after graduation in 1865, Comfort began the practice of her profession in that city. She was the first woman graduate in medicine to practice in Connecticut. By her strong personality and her professional success, she soon won a large and important patronage in Norwich and eastern Connecticut. But success did not come without difficulties:—

"They tore down my sign when I began to practice; the drug stores did not like to fill my prescriptions, and the older doctors would not consult with me. But that little band of women made it possible for the other women who have come later into the field to do their work. When my first patients came and saw me, they said I was too young, and they asked in horried tones if I had studied dissecting just like the men. They were shocked at that, but they were more shocked when my bills were sent into find that I charged as much as a man."

By 1865, Comfort was an active supporter of women's suffrage and of the advancement of woman in industrial and professional careers. She also advocated for the abolition of slavery, peace, and dress reform.

=== New York City ===
In 1870, after developing a successful medical practice, succeeded to by her sister, Dr. Emily Manning Smith, Comfort returned to New York City to take up a practice left by the death of a cousin. She was appointed lecturer at her alma mater, New York Medical College for Women, and was elected a member of the newly-founded Sorosis society. At one time, Comfort had seven women members of her family practicing medicine in New York City, besides her sister, Dr. Emily Manning Smith, and her aunt, Dr. Lozier.

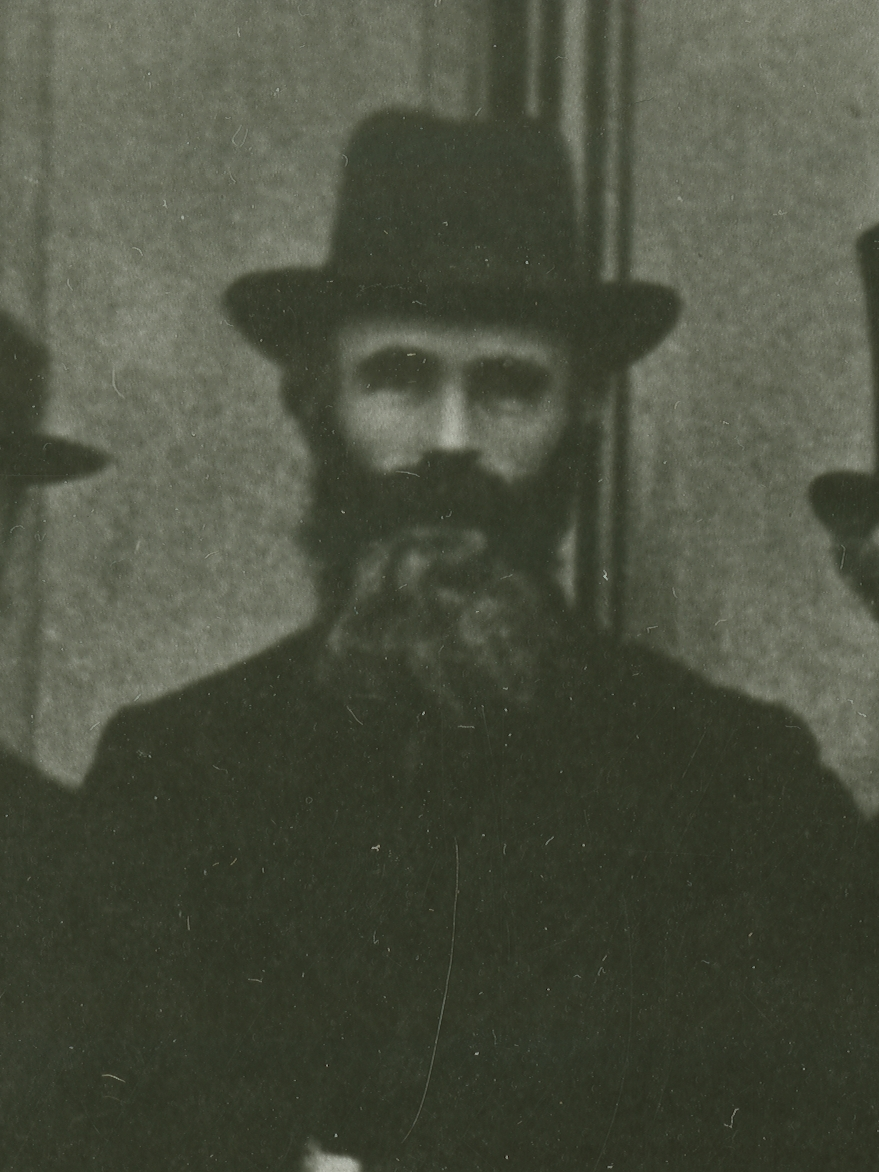
George Fisk Comfort (circa 1875)

During her time in New York, she met the art historian George Fisk Comfort, L.H.D., whom she married on January 19, 1871. George Comfort was a scholar in linguistics and art criticism, and was one of the principal founders of the Metropolitan Museum of Art.

=== Syracuse ===
Soon after their marriage, George Comfort was hired by the newly-founded Syracuse University as a Professor of Modern Languages, History and Aesthetics. In 1872, after some deliberation, Comfort decided to leave her medical practice to move with her husband to Syracuse, New York, giving up her career for her husband's. After moving to Syracuse, Comfort devoted her time to the duties of a prominent professor’s wife, and to raising her three biological and two adopted children: Ralph Manning Comfort, Frederic Price Comfort, Arthur Sterling Comfort, Silas Comfort and Grace Comfort.

When her children were older, Comfort resumed her medical career, specializing in gynecology, and practiced for nearly thirty years thereafter. The resumption of her medical practice brought many remarks among the university people, among whom she had about an equal number of supporters and critics. In the field of gynecology, she achieved success and distinction.

In 1874, Anna and George Comfort co-authored Women's Education and Women's Health: Chiefly in Reply to "Sex in Education." The work was a response to Sex in Education by Edward H. Clarke, which argued against the higher education of woman. Comfort lectured on the League of Nations and contributed articles to the Peace Award Contests. She made contributions on medical subjects to the professional journals, as well many writings in prose and poetry to various publications. Since retiring from her active medical practice, Comfort wrote prose, verse, and biographies.

In 1887 and 1891, Comfort traveled extensively in Europe, where she visited many important hospitals and medical institutions.

In 1899, Comfort published a poem titled "Home Burdens of Uncle Sam," an anti-imperialist response to "The White Man's Burden" by Rudyard Kipling.

Comfort held memberships in the New York Woman’s Medical Society; Honorary Membership in the Lozier Medical Club; and 55 years of membership in Sorosis.

== Death and legacy ==
In 1916, the New York Medical College and Hospital for Women established an endowed scholarship named in Comfort's honor.

Anna Manning Comfort died of pneumonia, in New York, January 12, 1931.

== Selected works ==
- Women's Education and Women's Health: Chiefly in Reply to "Sex in Education", with George Fisk Comfort (Syracuse: T.W. Dunston, 1874)
