= Clemence S. Lozier =

American physician

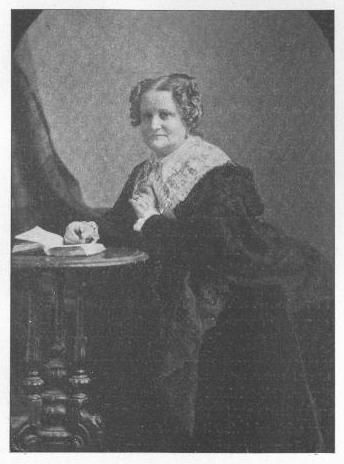
- Born: Clemence Sophia Harned; December 11, 1813; Plainfield, New Jersey, U.S.
- Died: April 26, 1888 (aged 74); New York City, New York, U.S.
- Resting place: Green-Wood Cemetery, Brooklyn
- Education: Syracuse Medical College (1853)
- Spouse(s): Abraham Witton Lozier (c. 1829 — died 1837), John Baker (1844 — divorced 1861)
- Children: Abraham Witton Lozier Jr.
- Scientific career
- Fields: Homeopathy, surgery, gynecology
- Notable students: Anna Manning Comfort (niece)

Clemence Sophia Lozier (née Harned; December 11, 1813 — April 26, 1888) was an American medical doctor who founded the New York Medical College and Hospital for Women. Dr. Lozier was also a noted feminist and activist, and served as president of the New York City Suffrage League and the National Women's Suffrage Association.

== Early life ==
Clemence Sophia Harned, daughter of farmer David Harned and Hannah (Walker) Harned, was born on December 11, 1812, in Plainfield, New Jersey. Before residing in Plainfield, the family lived in Virginia among Indian tribes. This is where Lozier's mother gained valuable information from the Indians that aided her in becoming an attendant to the sick. Lozier was exposed to medicine at an early age, observing her mother treat the sick in her town with traditional medicine. She was the youngest of 13 children and was orphaned at 11 years old. While living with relatives, she finished her schooling at Plainfield Academy.

At age 17, she was married to Abraham Witton Lozier, an architect many years her senior. Both her father and husband were dedicated members of the Methodist Church, and she herself felt Methodism built women up and allowed for differences in opinion. Two of her older brothers were successful preachers in the Methodist church. Her father was also a well known presence in the church. This gave her the foundation for strong religious roots that she carried throughout her life. When her husband's health began to fail, Lozier started to study physiology. When she was 19 she began teaching classes from her home to educate girls in anatomy, physiology, and hygiene.

She taught up to 60 students a year for 11 years. The students came from prominent families so Lozier was able to establish herself as a highly regarded teacher. She taught hygiene and anatomy which she learned from her older physician brother. He also helped guide her interest in medicine into her late thirties.

She was one of the first teachers in the city to introduce the study of Psychology, Hygiene and Anatomy as branches of the female education. At the time, these topics were not included in women's education, and her classes quickly expanded. Among other topics, she educated women on the physiological consequences of fashion, like the deformities and breathing problems caused by corsets. She continued to teach these classes until 1843.

Soon after, she moved to New York and continued giving lectures and visiting the sick. Her first husband died in 1837, and she later remarried to John Baker in New York. The marriage eventually ended in divorce, but little is known about what happened during the relationship. After her husband's death in 1837, Lozier continued with her medical training which she desired to devote herself

== Education ==
Lozier attended Plainfield Academy and learned about medicine from her mother and brother as well as from caring for her ill husband. She wished to attend medical school, but women were not accepted at the time, so her brother continued to tutor her. She continued to apply to medical schools and experienced a lot of rejection, even from Geneva Medical College, which was attended by Elizabeth Blackwell. Eventually, she was allowed to attend classes at Central New York College of Rochester in 1849, and was later admitted to Syracuse Eclectic College. In 1850 the Central Medical College of New York moved to Rochester and became Rochester Eclectic Medical College. In 1849 the Eclectic Medical Institute merged with Randolph Eclectic Medical Institute and moved to Syracuse to become the Central Medical College of New York, which agreed to admit Lozier as a medical student.

Ten years after graduation, Lozier founded the homeopathic New York Medical College and Hospital for Women. This became the most important institution for women's homeopathic education in the United States. Lozier struggled, even in her own institute, to promote gender equality. She began to replace male professors with competent women. There was an issue when Issac M. Ward in 1866 refused to leave his position when Lozier wanted to replace him with Ann Innman.

She graduated top of her class in 1853 and dedicated herself to the teachings of Samuel Hahnemann and the new homeopathic movement in medicine. Since her degree, in 1853 women could finally go to a hospital and be treated by a doctor of the same gender. Lozier studied medicine under the direction of her brother William Harned. William was a good reputable physician in New York and was partnered with Dr. Doane who was formerly a quarantine physician in a chemical laboratory. In 1860, she began a course of familiar lectures in her own parlor. This continued for three years during which a “Medical Library Association” was formed, for the purpose of promoting reading upon such subjects on the anatomy of women.

== Medical career ==
Before her acceptance to medical school, Lozier had extensive experience with observing disease in its worst forms among women and children. She had performed more than a hundred and twenty “capital operations” in the removal of vital tumors. When scholars were ill, she would be called before physicians. Her advice would be sole reliance in ordinary diseases. After graduating from medical school, Lozier began a private practice that focused on homeopathic treatments. She specialized in obstetrics and gynecology, but was also renowned for her surgical skills, especially the removal of tumors. Her practice became very successful and returned over $25,000 annually. She believed that women were better suited to become physicians due to the natural instinct and aptitude of their sex. She specifically advocated for more female obstetricians, citing her own large patient list as evidence of patient preferences—she would often see over 50 patients a day.

From 1860 to 1863 she taught private lectures in her home, which led to the formation of "A Ladies' Medical Association". Due to increasing enrollment, she collaborated with her friend Elizabeth Cady Stanton to petition for a charter for a women's medical college. Seeing high demand for the lectures and wasted talent from women getting turned away from medical school, Dr. Lozier, with the help from Elizabeth Cady Stanton, was able to persuade the New York State legislature to grant her a charter for a women's medical college. In 1863, the New York medical college for women opened with seven female students in the inaugural class and a faculty of eight doctors: four were women and four were men.

In 1863, she founded the New York Medical College and Hospital for Women, the first of its kind. She was president of the college and taught courses on the diseases of women and children. During its first year, seven female students were enrolled and taught by four male and four female physicians. For seven years, Lozier supported the college with her own income, and donated $10,000 in lump sum. After the Civil War, Lozier visited Europe in 1867 to observe hospitals and speak with physicians. Upon her return, she resumed teaching under the titles of dean of the school and professor of gynaecology and obstetrics. After practicing at thirty-sixth street for 11 years, shareholders and investors encouraged her to expand the Women's Medical College. However, after a large new building was purchased, the investors backed out, forcing Lozier to declare bankruptcy in 1878. Lozier lost everything, but the college survived and she threw herself back into practicing medicine on Thirty-fourth Street for the next eleven years. The Women's Medical College would eventually become a part of the New York Medical College in 1918.

== Advocacy ==
Lozier was devoted to improving the lives of others, going beyond just treating patients. She hosted Anti-Slavery Society meetings monthly at her own home, and she provided refuge for African Americans during the July Riots of 1862. Once a month Lozier would host Anti Slavery meetings. During times of riots and violence, she would open her home to colored people as well as collect food and medicine for children of the Colored Orphan Asylum after it had burned down. Her son claimed "her house was a Mecca for all reformers, and bristled like a fortress from garret to cellar with ammunitions of war--documents and pamphlets upon woman's disabilities under the law, arguments and petitions in behalf of suffrage, anti-slavery and temperance, sanitary reform, international arbitration, amelioration of the condition of the Indians, moral education, reform of prisons and insane asylums, etc." She helped found the Female Guardian Society with Margaret Pryor, which visited prisons and poor areas of New York to help mistreated women and children. For 7 years Lozier and Pryor would visit the poor and abandoned in connection with the Moral Reform Society, and often prescribed for them in sickness.

She was a well-known suffragist and was good friends with Elizabeth Cady Stanton. She fought for the rights of her female students to attend classes with men at the Bellevue Hospital College by swaying public opinion during public meetings. She further fought for women's rights in the courtroom and successfully advocated for the release of Hester Vaughan, who had been wrongfully convicted and sentenced to death for infanticide. Additionally, she fought for women's right to vote. When Susan B. Anthony was sentenced for voting, she called a public meeting to criticize Chief Justice Hunt who sentenced her. She served as the president of many prominent organizations including the Woman's American Temperance League, the Moral Education Society of New York, the National Woman's Suffrage Association for five years, and the New York Woman's Suffrage Society from 1873 to 1886.

=== Organizations ===
1. Homeopathic County Society
2. WCTU
3. National Woman Suffrage Association
4. New York Suffrage League
5. City Ladies' Suffrage Committee
6. Universal Peace Union
7. New York Abolitionists' Reunion
8. American Female Guardian Society
9. Moral Education Society

== Legacy ==
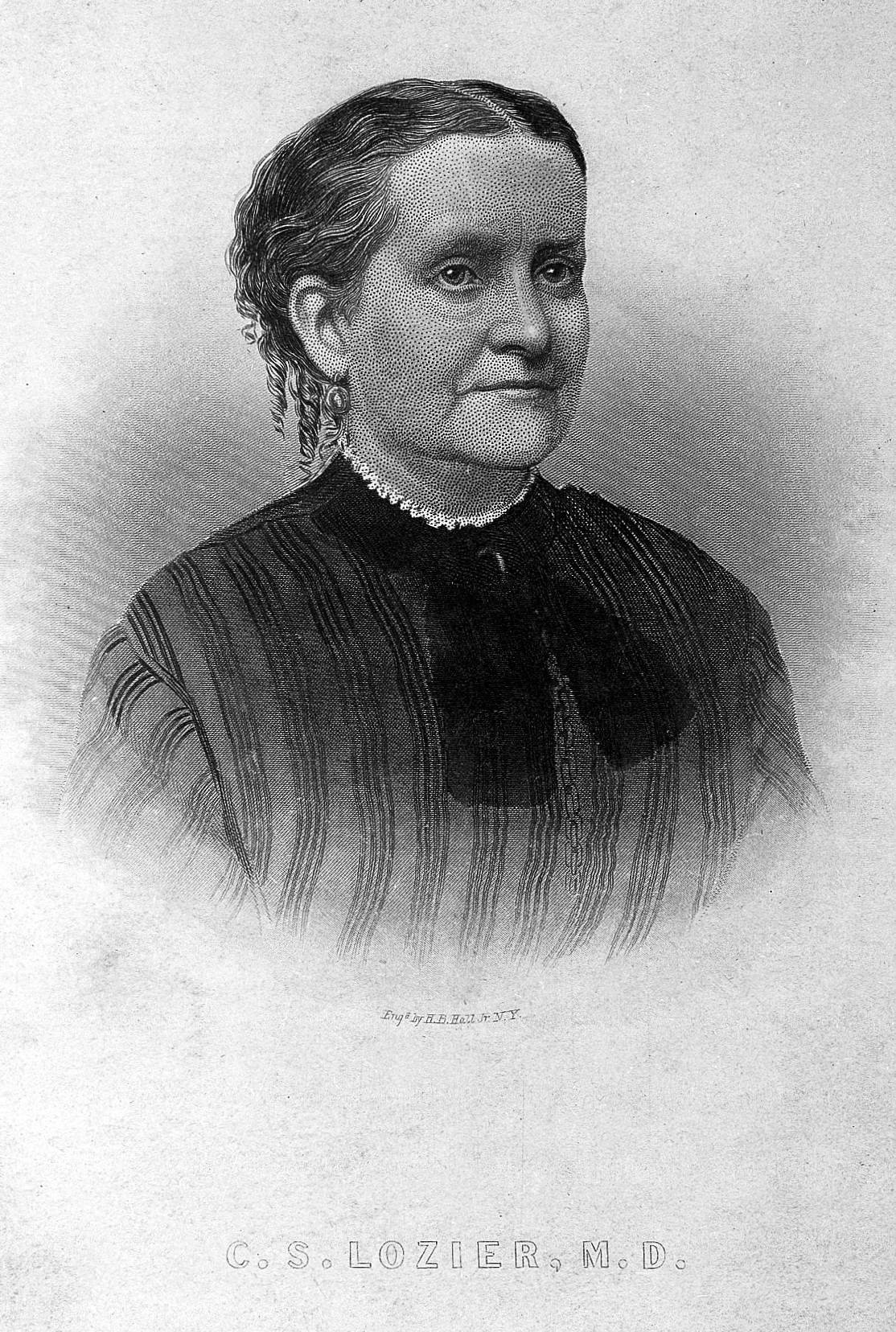
Image from Child-Birth Made Easy

Lozier founded the first Medical College for women and trained over 200 female physicians. The hospital attracted over 2,000 female patients a year and was the first place a woman could be treated by a female physician, paving the way for women to regain control of childbirth. She, herself, gave birth to seven sons, but only Dr. Abraham W. Lozier survived. Nevertheless, by the time of her death, she had already inspired nine of her direct relatives to become physicians, including her daughter-in-law, Charlotte Denman Lozier, who graduated from the medical college she founded. She also increased the credibility of female physicians. Elizabeth Cady Stanton claimed "Physicians would not recognize her as a member of the profession... they tampered with her patients to see if they could find aught against her. But in spite of all the machinations of her enemies, she triumphed".

As the first woman to read a scientific paper before the New York State Medical Society, Lozier also blazed a trail for female scientists. She further advocated for the incorporation of physiology classes in schools and preached the importance of education at meetings and in writing. Dr. Lozier is the reason women in New York could finally study medicine. Before her, there were no institutes in New York that offered classes to women. She became president and clinical professor of diseases of women (1863-1867) and dean and professor of gynecology (1867-1888) and had a private practice (1853-1888)

One of her most well-known documents was a short pamphlet, Child-Birth Made Easy, empowering mothers with knowledge. Lozier died from heart troubles two days after giving the 25th commencement speech in 1888 at the College she founded.
