= Anna Wetherill Olmsted =

American museum director and ceramist (1888–1981)

- Born: 1888; Syracuse, New York, U.S.
- Died: February 8, 1981 (aged 92–93)
- Resting place: Oakwood Cemetery; Syracuse, New York, U.S.
- Education: Syracuse University
- Occupations: museum director, art critic
- Known for: Director of the Syracuse Museum of Fine Arts (1930–1957)

Anna Wetherill Olmsted (1888 – February 8, 1961) was an American museum director and art critic from Syracuse, New York. She was the founder of the National Ceramic Exhibition and served as director of the Syracuse Museum of Fine Art (now the Everson Museum) from 1930 to 1957. Her work was instrumental to increasing the prominence of ceramics as an art form in the United States.

== Early life and education ==
Anna Wetherill Olmsted was born in 1888, in Syracuse, New York. She was a great-granddaughter of early American art patron Charles Wetherill and studied painting at the Syracuse University College of Fine Arts.

== Career ==
Olmsted briefly worked as assistant director of the Syracuse Museum of Fine Arts from 1929 until 1930, when she became museum director, a position she held until 1957. After stepping down as director, she was named director emeritus and curator of decorative arts at the museum.

In 1932, Olmsted founded the National Ceramic Exhibition, also known as the Ceramic Nationals, in memory of the ceramist Adelaide Alsop Robineau. By the end of the 1930s, the event, which featured a juried competition culminating in an exhibition of the winning pieces, was the most prominent showcase of new ceramic art in the United States. Under Olmsted's directorship, the Syracuse Museum of Fine Arts gained an international reputation as a pioneer in the field of ceramics and displayed the works of prominent ceramic artists including Eva Zeiseil, Maria Martinez, and Maija Grotell.

The tenth National Ceramic Exhibition was presented in conjunction with an exhibit titled "Contemporary Ceramics of the Western Hemisphere" and was sponsored by IBM founder and president Thomas J. Watson.

In 1937, Olmsted was appointed a delegate to the International Exhibition in Paris by President Franklin D. Roosevelt. She was also a prominent supporter of federal art programs introduced as part of the New Deal.

Olmsted travelled widely throughout the United States, delivering lectures on ceramics and art at the Museum of Fine Arts in Boston, the Metropolitan Museum of Art in New York City, Cornell University, and the Virginia Museum of Fine Arts, among other institutions. She was also an art critic for The Post-Standard from 1923 to 1945.

== Personal life ==
Olmstead was a member of the First Presbyterian Church of Syracuse. She died on February 8, 1981, at the age of 92 and is buried in Oakwood Morningside Cemetery in Syracuse.
