= Sarah F. Norton =

American feminist

- Born: Sarah Frances Rice
- Died: 1910 (aged 72); Troy, New York
- Burial place: Oakwood Cemetery, Troy, N.Y.
- Nationality: American
- Occupation(s): Writer, speaker, philanthropist
- Spouse: Norris Randall Norton

Sarah Frances Norton (born Sarah Frances Rice, c. 1838 in Ithaca, N.Y. – January 7, 1910 in Troy, N.Y.) was an American feminist of the 19th century and member of the Working Women's Association. A public speaker and philanthropist, she wrote for feminist publications as a supporter of women's rights. Norton was also a novelist and lecturer, and she became the president of the Working Women's Association in 1869, shortly before it dissolved.

== Biography ==
According to her obituary, Sarah Norton was a great-granddaughter of President John Adams. She married Norris Randall Norton of New York city. He had been an officer in the civil war and died in 1870.

Working with Susan B. Anthony, Sarah Norton campaigned for the admission of women at the Cornell University, which she called “that stronghold of feminine prejudice,” and the two women received the support of its founder, Ezra Cornell. The school admitted women in 1870, one of the first American universities to do so.

As a member of the Working Women's Association, she also campaigned for the equality of men and women. In addition to advocating for the education of women, she petitioned for equal opportunity and equal pay in the workplace. She also firmly opposed abortion as stated in her article "Tragedy - Social and Domestic", published in Woodhull & Claflin's Weekly, in which she states that "perhaps there will come a time when an unmarried mother will not be despised because of her motherhood… and when the right of the unborn to be born will not be denied or interfered with." Sarah Norton critiqued abortion as the "fast increasing crime of feticide or abortion". Additionally Norton was one of the original advocates of a society against cruelty to animals and children.

Having lost her fortune, Sarah Norton died at age 72 in 1910, in Troy, N.Y. in poverty. Her obituary in the January 8, 1910 edition of The Washington Times recorded her later life as alone, friendless and surrounded by all the evidences of poverty. She had lived on a widow's pension of 20 dollars a month for years. A penciled statement found clutched in her hand illustrated the circumstances in which she found herself as she approached death, stating, "I have spent my life and nearly two fortunes working in the interest of women and this is the end-friendless-dissolution-death. ... let no one play at philanthropy who wants peace."
