= Women's Typographical Union =

19th century women's labor union

The Women's Typographical Union (WTU) was the first labor union in the United States specifically for women. It was established in 1868 by Augusta Lewis and 39 other women, with support from Elizabeth Cady Stanton and Susan B. Anthony. The union was active for a decade before its dissolution in 1878.

== Background ==
In the 19th century, many American women were employed in typesetting: at least 200 were recorded to have been working in Boston by 1831. Labor unions of that time were suspicious of women in the trade, as they were typically paid less than men and were viewed as threatening men's jobs. However, some men, such as Horace Greeley in 1854, were pleased to see women typesetters and hoped that they would soon receive equal pay to men. Many locals would not admit women, but some did. The first woman to join the National Typographical Union (NTU) was Annie R. Mitchell of Burlington, Iowa, who joined Local 75 in 1863.

== Formation ==
In 1867, the New York World hired women typesetters to replace striking men from NTU Local 6. When the strike was resolved, the women were all fired, with the paper claiming they'd only been hired for philanthropic reasons. Journalist and typesetter Augusta Lewis, who also worked at the World, resigned her own position in protest and, on 8 October 1868, established a new union, the Women's Typographical Union, to represent the fired women and other New York women working in the printing trades. In 1869 she was instrumental in preventing WTU members from working as strikebreakers when NTU workers were striking in New York.

The new union was enthusiastically supported by The Revolution, Stanton and Anthony's weekly newspaper. Ironically, The Revolution later came into conflict with the union as it was found to be paying below-union rates to the women typesetters in its own employ.

In July of 1869, the union was granted membership in the NTU, and the new parent organization adopted a by-law permitting all-women unions on the condition that they not work for lower wages than men.

== Dissolution ==
While the WTU supported their union brothers, refusing to replace striking men or accept lower wages, their solidarity was not always repaid. Male foremen refused to hire women, or treated them poorly. In 1871, Lewis lamented that the WTU members "have never obtained a situation that we could not have obtained had we never heard of a union. We refuse to take the men's situations when they are on strike, and when there is no strike if we ask for work in union offices we are told by union foremen 'that there are no conveniences for us. We are ostracized in many offices because we are members of the union; and, although the principle is right, disadvantages are so many that we cannot much longer hold together."

By 1974, membership had dwindled from over fifty at its peak to only twenty-eight. In 1878 the union was dissolved; some former members joined New York Local 6.
