= Hester Vaughn =

Hester Vaughn, or Vaughan, was a domestic servant in Philadelphia who was arrested in 1868 on a charge of killing her newborn infant, and was sentenced to hang after being convicted of infanticide. The Revolution, a women's rights newspaper established by Susan B. Anthony and Elizabeth Cady Stanton, conducted a campaign to win her release from prison. The Working Women's Association, an organization that was formed in the offices of The Revolution, organized a mass meeting in New York City in her defense. Eventually Vaughn was pardoned by the governor of Pennsylvania, and deported back to her native England.

== Arrest and trial ==
Hester Vaughn was an Englishwoman who came to the United States in 1863. Some contemporary accounts suggest that she had immigrated along with a husband, whom she later discovered to be a bigamist. By 1868, she was reportedly unmarried and employed as a domestic servant in Philadelphia. In February of that year - after attempting to conceal her pregnancy - she gave birth alone in a rented room. Neighbors later discovered her there with her dead infant and informed the police.

Vaughn was arrested and charged with the first-degree murder of her child. In July, 1868, she was tried for infanticide in Philadelphia's Court of Common Pleas, with judge James R. Ludlow presiding. According to a contemporary Philadelphia newspaper account, the coroner testified that the newborn baby had suffered severe injuries to the skull. Vaughn was reported to have said that she had been startled by someone coming into her room and had fallen on the baby, killing it. The all-male jury found her guilty of deliberately killing her child, and she was sentenced to death by hanging. The judge was later reported to have said that infanticide had become so common that "some woman must be made an example of."

== Defense campaign ==
In August, 1868, the women's rights newspaper The Revolution, established by Susan B. Anthony and Elizabeth Cady Stanton, launched a campaign in Vaughn's defense. According to historian Sarah Barringer Gordon, women's rights activists had been searching for a popular cause through which to raise awareness about women's oppression when Vaughn's case came to their attention. The newspaper initially described Vaughn as a "poor, ignorant, friendless and forlorn girl who had killed her newborn child because she knew not what else to do with it," elaborating that "If that poor child of sorrow is hung, it will be deliberate, downright murder. Her death will be a far more horrible infanticide than was the killing of her child." In a nod to the issue of women's suffrage, the editorial also mentioned that Vaughn had been wronged by "the legislature that enacted the law" under which she was tried, for as a woman, she necessarily had no "vote or voice" in such matters.

As its campaign developed, The Revolution modified its approach. In December, 1868, it argued that Vaughn had become pregnant through "brute force," suggesting she had been raped. It also implied that the infant's death had occurred either naturally or accidentally: "During one of the fiercest storms of last winter she was without food or fire or comfortable apparel. She had been ill and partially unconscious for three days before her confinement, and a child was born to Hester Vaughan. Hours passed before she could drag herself to the door and cry out for assistance, and when she did it was to be dragged to a prison."

The Working Women's Association (WWA), an organization that had been formed in the offices of The Revolution, made Vaughn's case its first public cause, with a goal of obtaining her pardon from Pennsylvania governor John W. Geary. In November, 1868, Anna Dickinson, a well-known orator on the subject of women's rights, gave a lecture for the WWA at the Cooper Institute in New York City, in which she "described the girl's terrible wrongs and sufferings," and declared her support. The WWA then sent a committee, which included Clemence Lozier, a female doctor, to Philadelphia to meet and interview Hester Vaughn in Moyamensing Prison. According to Dr. Lozier's report in The Revolution, Vaughn's only visitor prior to the committee's meeting was another female doctor, Dr. Smith. Both Dr. Lozier and Dr. Smith agreed that Vaughn was innocent of the charge of infanticide, and had almost certainly suffered from "puerperal mania," now understood as postpartum psychosis. Among other symptoms, this had included temporary blindness, leading them to argue that if the infant had indeed been born living - which was unclear, as it has never been examined - Vaughn may have inadvertently smothered it, as she was alone during and after the birth and could not see.

After the committee's return, the WWA organized a large meeting on Vaughn's behalf, also held at the Cooper Institute. At the meeting, influential editor Horace Greeley urged the crowd to focus on Vaughn's release. Susan B. Anthony then introduced several resolutions, beginning with a call for a new trial, on the grounds that Vaughn had not been tried by a jury of her peers; or for an unconditional pardon, as Vaughn was "condemned on insufficient evidence and with inadequate defense." Other resolutions were broader in scope, calling for women to serve on juries and to have a voice in making laws and electing public officials, and for the end to the death penalty. All of the resolutions were adopted by the WWA. Elizabeth Cady Stanton also spoke at the meeting, where she issued a demand for women's suffrage, and for women to have the rights to hold public office and serve on juries.

After the meeting, a New York newspaper reported that Vaughn's case was intended to be the first of many causes taken on by the WWA. "Miss Anthony wanted it understood that the workingwomen were going to defend the defenceless of their own sex," it explained, and quoted Anthony as saying, "As soon as we get Hester Vaughan out of prison we will get somebody else to work for. We intend to keep up the excitement." The WWA, however, took on no additional legal cases, and by December, 1868, it had disbanded. Furthermore, the WWA's campaign for Hester Vaughn's release was also criticized in several newspapers. For example, according to the New York Evening Telegram, none of the speakers at the WWA's meeting "expressed the slightest sympathy with the thousands of poor little infants who are sacrificed to this puerperal mania or something else every month of the year... Hester Vaughn's murdered child is surely entitled to some pity as well." The Nation said that Vaughn's conviction was "denounced with as much fury as if the woman's story of bigamy, and the rape which the victim refuses to prove, made it in some mysterious way the duty of the Governor to treat the infanticide as really a blameless act".

Despite the case's divisiveness, Governor Geary pardoned Vaughn and she was deported back to England, though it was unclear if the above campaign was the motivation for the governor's decision. After returning to England, Vaughn reportedly lived in illness and poverty.

== Aftermath ==
There is no mention of Hester Vaughn in the History of Woman Suffrage, Stanton and Anthony's multi-volume history of the women's suffrage movement, and articles about Vaughn stopped appearing in The Revolution in early 1869. In 1876, Stanton and Anthony's "Declaration of Rights of the Women of the United States" did reference infanticide, stating that women's lack of rights and representation on juries resulted in their unfair treatment within the legal system: "Young girls have been arraigned in our courts for the crime of infanticide; tried, convicted, hung - victims, perchance, of judge, jurors, advocates, while no woman's voice could be heard in their defence." Nevertheless, according to historian Sarah Barringer Gordon, suffragists faced a damaging public backlash for their support of a woman convicted of infanticide, and their work on Vaughn's behalf ultimately proved detrimental to their credibility.

== Bibliography ==
- Balser, Diane (1987). Sisterhood & Solidarity: Feminism and Labor in Modern Times. Boston: South End Press.
- Barry, Kathleen (1988). Susan B. Anthony: A Biography of a Singular Feminist. New York: Ballantine Books.
- DuBois, Ellen Carol (1978). Feminism and Suffrage: The Emergence of an Independent Women's Movement in America, 1848-1869. Ithaca, NY: Cornell University Press.
- Farless, Patricia L. "Hester Vaughan: Infanticide, Woman's Rights, and Melodrama", in Selected Annual Proceedings of the Florida Conference of Historians, Annual Meeting, 2004. Published in 2005 by the Florida Conference of Historians: 1076–4585.
- Gordon, Sarah Barringer. "Law and Everyday Death: Infanticide and the Backlash against Woman's Rights after the Civil War", in Lives in the Law, edited by Austin Sarat, Lawrence Douglas and Martha Umphrey (2006). University of Michigan Press.
- Gordon, Ann D., editor (2000). The Selected Papers of Elizabeth Cady Stanton and Susan B. Anthony: Against an aristocracy of sex, 1866 to 1873. Vol. 2 of 6. New Brunswick, NJ: Rutgers University Press.
- Knappman, Edward, editor (1994). Great American Trials, "Hester Vaughan Trial: 1868", by Kathryn Cullen-DuPont, pp. 155–157. Detroit: Visible Ink Press.
- Sherr, Lynn (1995). Failure is Impossible: Susan B. Anthony in Her Own Words. New York: Random House.
