= Scop (disambiguation) =

Scop is a general name for an Old English poet.

Scop or SCOP may also refer to:

Scop

- Scops owl
- Scop., taxonomic author abbreviation of Giovanni Antonio Scopoli (1723–1788), Italian physician and naturalist

SCOP

- Structural Classification of Proteins
- Suprachiasmatic nucleus circadian oscillatory protein, a member of the leucine-rich repeat protein family
- Société coopérative, a type of corporation in France
- Standing Conference of Principals, a British higher education organisation
- Seasonal coefficient of performance, a measure for the efficiency of a heat pump
- Supreme Court of Pennsylvania, the highest court in the Commonwealth of Pennsylvania.

== See also ==
- Centro SCOP (Mexico City Metrobús), a BRT station in Mexico City
