= Ingrid Skop =

American ob-gyn and anti-abortion activist

- Education: Oklahoma State University; Washington University School of Medicine; University of Texas Health Science Center at San Antonio

Ingrid Skop is an American obstetrics and gynecology physician and anti-abortion activist who is the vice president and director of medical affairs at the Charlotte Lozier Institute, the research arm of the political advocacy group Susan B. Anthony Pro-Life America. The Texas Tribune has called Skop "the first call for anyone looking for an OB/GYN to publicly defend abortion restrictions".

== Life ==
Skop earned a Bachelor of Science in physiology from the Oklahoma State University–Stillwater. She received a M.D. at the Washington University School of Medicine. Skop completed an obstetrics and gynecology residency at the University of Texas Health Science Center at San Antonio. She is a fellow of the American College of Obstetricians and Gynecologists. According to Skop's own accounting she has “delivered over 5,000 babies in over 30 years” of practice.

Skop is a member of the American Association of Pro-Life Obstetricians and Gynecologists. She is the vice president and director of medical affairs at the Charlotte Lozier Institute, the research arm of the political advocacy group Susan B. Anthony Pro-Life America.

Skop is also a plaintiff in a US Supreme Court lawsuit seeking to revoke the Food and Drug Administration's approval of the abortion drug mifepristone. As of May 2024, the case remains under consideration with the court.

In May 2024, Skop was appointed by Jennifer Shuford, the commissioner of the Texas Department of State Health Services, to a six-year term on the Texas Maternal Mortality and Morbidity Review Committee (MMMRC). Her term begins on June 1, 2024.

== Controversies ==
A 2024 ACLU brief, submitted to the Supreme Court (ACLU et al. Amicus Brief, AHM v. FDA), pointed out that Skop has never held an academic position and did not author a single journal entry between the 1990s and 2018. The ACLU further catalogued the controversies associated with Skop's testimony across several cases.

In a 2020 Utah deposition, Skop admitted she is "not a really good researcher." She admitted that she cited the website abort73.com for statistics in an expert report because she could not find any other data source, and that she did so despite not knowing “who created the website” nor "who supplies the numbers.” Skop also professed to not know whether “identical republication of material from another author without attribution is consistent with standards of academic integrity.” She claimed she "didn’t realize that, you know, using wording from a paper that you agreed with qualified as plagiarism."

The ACLU also cited a 2022 Florida case in which the court rejected Skop's testimony, finding that she "admitted that her testimony on the risks certain abortion complications was   inaccurate   and   overstated, or based on data from decades ago."[8] Weeks after the Florida ruling, Skop submitted similar testimony in Georgia without correcting the errors she admitted to in Florida.[8]

In February 2024, in response to concerns regarding methodology and data analysis, Sage retracted three abortion related studies they had previously published. Furthermore, a number of authors and peer-reviewers of thoe articles were associated with pro-life organizations ― conflicts of interest that they did not disclose to the publisher prior to publication. Based on the newly discovered conflict, Sage determined the peer review was unreliable. Post-publication peer review found serious flaws in the methodology and analysis, leading to the decision to retract the papers. Skop was the fifth author on one of the retracted papers: Doctors Who Perform Abortions: Their Characteristics and Patterns of Holding and Using Hospital Privileges. Health Services Research and Managerial Epidemiology. 2019

Skop was appointed to the Texas MMMRC as a community member representing rural areas, despite the fact that she lives and works in San Antonio, the seventh-largest city in the US. Skop replaced lay advocate Nakeenya Wilson. That change was made possible following a 2023 legislative change, which replaced a single "advocate" with "community members with experience in a relevant health care field, including a field involving the analysis of health care data". Despite the fact that her position was initially intended to run until 2027, Wilson was replaced by Skop and Dr. Meenakshi Awasthi of Houston.
