= Augusta Lewis Troup =

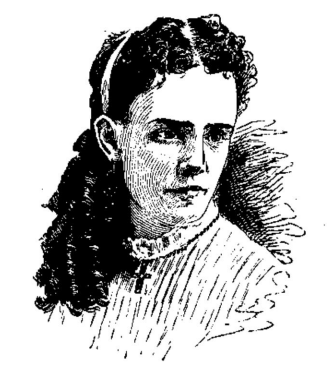
Etched portrait of Augusta Lewis from the American Dictionary of Printing and Bookmaking, New York, Howard Lockwood & Co., 1894

Augusta "Gussie" Lewis Troup (1848 – September 14, 1920) was an American women's rights activist and journalist who advocated for equal pay, better working conditions for women, and women's right to vote. She was inducted into the Connecticut Women's Hall of Fame in 2013.

== Biography ==
=== Early life ===
Born Augusta Lewis in 1848 in New York City, Augusta was orphaned as an infant. She was adopted by Isaac Gager, a wealthy Wall Street broker, and received a private education before attending the Brooklyn Heights Seminary.

=== Newspaper work ===
After the American Civil War, Augusta Lewis began writing articles for numerous New York papers, including the New York Tribune. She also wrote articles for The Revolution, a suffragist publication run by Susan B. Anthony and Elizabeth Cady Stanton. It was during her time writing for New York papers that she learned typesetting at the New York Era and New York World.

She observed first hand the unequal pay given to female typesetters when the male typesetter's union called a strike in 1867, and women were brought in to replace them for lower pay. The women were later fired when the strike ended and the men returned to work.

=== Trade union ===
In 1868, Augusta Lewis founded the Women's Typographical Union (WTU) Location No. 1 in New York City. Organizing a women's labor union allowed her to champion efforts to advocate for better working conditions and fair pay. Using her connection to The Revolution to advertise, membership quickly grew.

In 1869, Augusta represented the WTU at the International Typographical Union conference in Albany, NY. There she successfully lobbied the ITU to allow the WTU to join. In 1870, she was elected corresponding secretary of the ITU, the first woman to hold an ITU office.

=== Adult life ===
Augusta Lewis married Alexander Troup, a well-known labor leader, in 1872. After their marriage, the couple moved to New Haven, Connecticut, where they founded the New Haven Union, a pro-women's suffrage newspaper dedicated to union organization and the rights of women and other minorities. Together, the couple had seven children.

Augusta Lewis Troup began to teach in the New Haven school system and joined the Board of Education to advocate for teachers' rights. She established the New Haven Teachers' League in 1911 and lobbied for state-provided pensions for public school teachers.

=== Death and legacy ===
Augusta Lewis Troup died on September 14, 1920. In 1926, New Haven dedicated the Augusta Lewis Troup school in her honor, and re-dedicated it on 19 October 2008. There is a plaque in the foyer of the school that reads as follows:

We affectionately called her "Little Mother of the Italian Colony." Her broad sympathies and unfailing kindness helped us greatly when we most needed wise counsel and loyal friendship. Her liberal spirit and noble example lead us far along the road to a better understanding of American ideals and citizenship.
