= Everson Museum of Art =

Art museum in Syracuse, New York, U.S.

Coordinates: 43.044732°N 76.146848°W

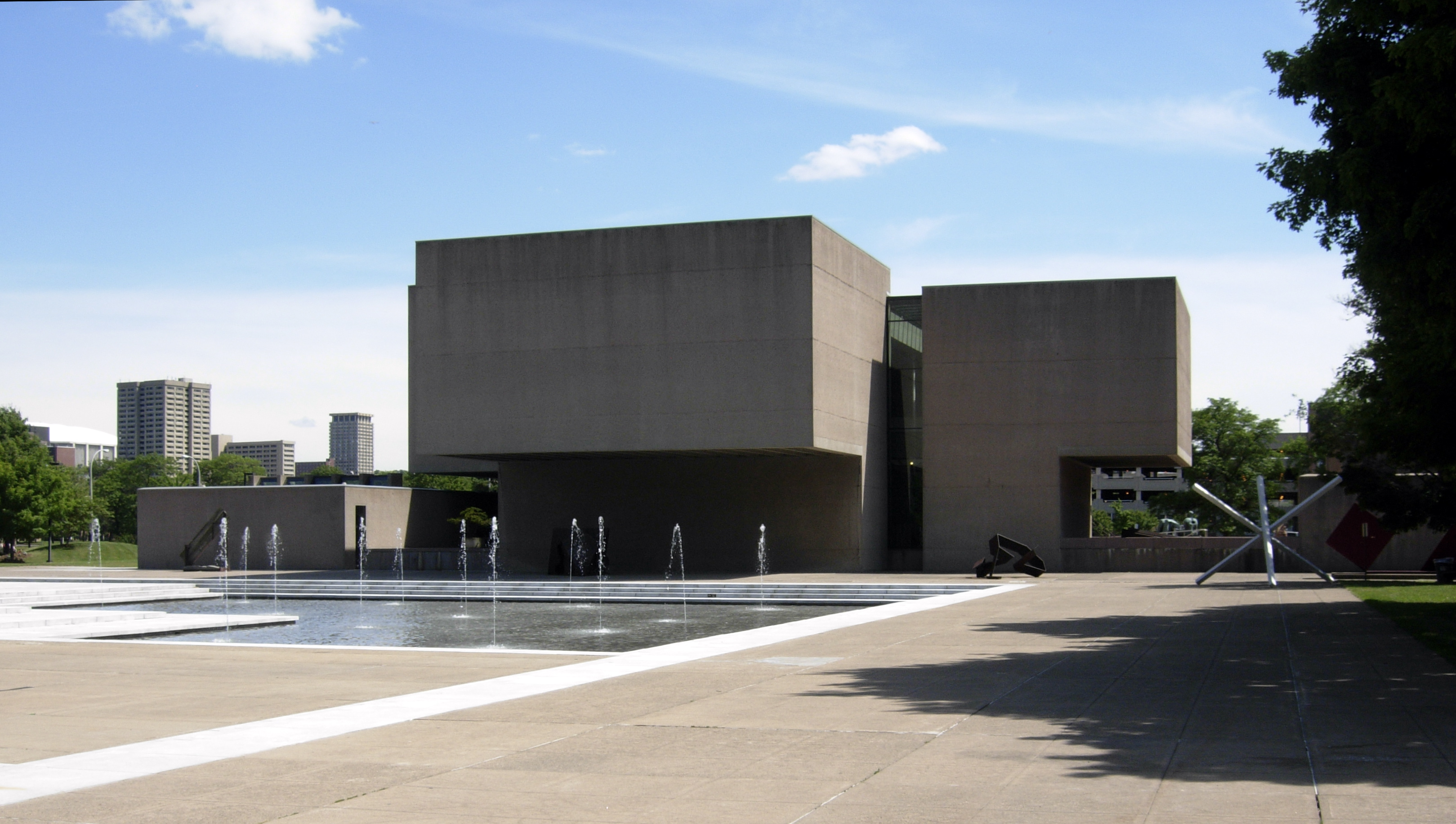
- Museum building, designed by I. M. Pei
- Established: 1897
- Location: 401 Harrison Street, Syracuse, New York, USA
- Type: Art museum
- Collections: Ceramic art American Painting; Sculpture; Video art
- Founder: George Fisk Comfort
- Director: Elizabeth Dunbar
- Website: everson.org

The Everson Museum of Art (/ˈiːvərsən/ EE-vər-sən) in Downtown Syracuse, New York, is a major Central New York museum focusing on American art.

== History ==
The museum was founded in 1897 by art historian George Fisk Comfort (who also helped found the Metropolitan Museum of Art); at that time, it was called the Syracuse Museum of Fine Arts. On the evening of 22 January 1897, the inaugural meeting was held in the May Memorial Church in Syracuse. In 1911, it announced that it would seek to collect only American art.

Over time, the museum occupied several buildings, including the Onondaga Savings Bank and the Syracuse Public Library, but it outgrew each.

In 1932, the Syracuse Museum of Fine Arts initiated its Ceramic National exhibitions, which became the most prestigious juried exhibition in the field of ceramics in the forty years that followed.

In 1941, Helen Everson made a $1 million gift to the city of Syracuse to fund the construction of an art museum. A groundbreaking took place in 1965, and in 1968 the new Everson Museum of Art opened. The new building was designed by architect I. M. Pei and is regarded as a work of art in its own right.

The Everson Museum collaborates with Light Work and the Urban Video Project (UVP) to exhibit video art on the facade of the building, including important works by Bill Viola, Jenny Holzer, William Wegman, among others. In the summer, they host a film series which is very popular for residents of Syracuse.

== Collection ==
The Everson houses roughly 11,000 pieces of art, including paintings, sculpture, ceramics, and video.

The Everson Museum of Art contains one of the most notable collections of ceramic art in the United States. In 1916, the Syracuse Museum of Fine Arts acquired a group of thirty-two works by renowned Syracuse-based potter Adelaide Alsop Robineau. After Robineau died in 1929, the museum acquired a second group of her porcelains, including the famed Scarab Vase, whose carving reportedly took more than 1000 hours. The museum now contains more than 100 works by Robineau.

In 1932, Museum director Anna Wetherill Olmsted founded the Ceramic National exhibitions as a tribute to Robineau. Over the next forty years, the Ceramic Nationals became the preeminent juried exhibition in ceramics. Purchase prizes were given to artists each year, which added pieces by such artists as Waylande Gregory, Maija Grotell, Marguerite Wildenhain, Peter Voulkos, Otto and Vivika Heino, Maria Martinez, Gertrud and Otto Natzler, and Robert Turner to the museum's collection.

Paintings include one of Gilbert Stuart's portraits of George Washington, Edward Hicks's The Peaceable Kingdom, and works by Eastman Johnson, Charles Burchfield, Helen Frankenthaler, Jackson Pollock and others as well as outdoors sculptures (Marja Vallila). In 1980, the Everson introduced Ching Ho Cheng's "Intimate Illuminations", the first Chinese-American contemporary painter to exhibit a one-man show nationally.

The Syracuse China Center for the Study of Ceramics is one of the largest ceramics collections in the nation, with pieces ranging from ancient sculpture and Ming dynasty porcelain up to contemporary works.

The museum established one of the first video art collections in the United States; its video collection is the largest in the world. Nam June Paik exhibited early works at the Everson, including his United States retrospective in 1974. Bill Viola's first job was as a video technician at the Everson; his works are now in the collection.

The museum also has a collection of Arts and Crafts Movement furniture, including works by Gustav Stickley.

== The building ==
The Everson Museum of Art was designed to be a sculpture in its own right. I.M. Pei conceived it as a sculptural object set against the city's modern architecture, not simply a "monumental container for art." The four cantilevered square volumes reinforce this quality. The exterior facades often serve as projection surfaces for films and images, with community members gathering in the neighboring courtyard to watch.

== Deaccessioning controversy ==
In September 2020, the Everson's board of trustees unanimously voted to remove and sell a Jackson Pollock painting from the museum's collection under a practice known as "deaccessioning." The deaccessioned painting, titled Red Composition, 1946, features Pollock's signature paint-splatter technique on a bright red canvas. Director Elizabeth Dunbar stated that proceeds from the sale would be used to "fight racism inside and outside our walls" by purchasing art created by members of underrepresented communities.

The Everson's plan to sell the Pollock at a Christie's auction on October 6, 2020, sparked controversy in art circles. The art critic Christopher Knight, writing in the Los Angeles Times, said that selling the Pollock was "inexcusable" and noted that the Everson's trustees announced their plan over "the media black hole that is Labor Day weekend." The Pollock's estimated value was $12–18 million. It sold for $12 million ($13 million with auction premium).

== Skateboarding ==
Skateboarders started skating at the Everson Museum of Art in the mid-1980s. The museum is a famous location for skateboarders, considered by some an "East Coast skate mecca." Filmmaker Bill Strobeck grew up outside of Syracuse and often came to Everson to skate with friends in the 1990s. It was in the plaza outside of the museum that Strobeck first started filming his friends skating. At that time, the museum welcomed the skaters to skate the plaza; it has since been made illegal. In 2007, on National Go Skateboarding Day, the museum made an exception, allowing skating at the plaza for the day. As of 2007, Central New York skateboarders have a campaign to re-open the plaza to skateboarding, using the saying "FREE eVe," meaning free the Everson Museum of Art.

== Location ==
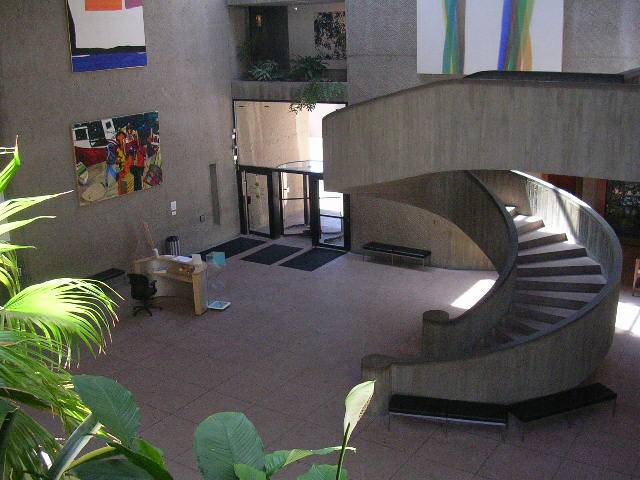
Lobby of the museum, as seen from the second floor

The museum is located in the southeast corner of Downtown Syracuse, at 401 Harrison Street, near the Oncenter complex. It is directly accessible from Interstate 81 Exit 18 (Adams Street / Harrison Street).

== Notable traveling exhibitions ==
The Everson has presented several exhibitions that are available for loan, either in entirety or broken down as individual artworks, including:

- Good Design: Stories from Herman Miller
- Fantasies and Fairy-Tales: Maxfield Parrish and the Art of the Print
- Turner to Cézanne: Masterpieces from the Davies Collection, National Museum Wales
- Pollock Matters
- Marie Antoinette: Styling the 18th-Century Superstar
