= Inyama yenhloko =

Traditional meat dish in southern Africa

Inyama yenhloko or yentloko or skopo, iskopo or skop is meat from the head of a cow, goat or sheep, a traditional Southern African dish.

Inyama yenhloko is traditionally boiled with salt, spices or beef stock and served with uphuthu or pap and umhluzi, a type of soup. The meat is mostly sold at taxi ranks and in townships. Most people enjoy it with chilli powder or chilli sauce. The dish traditionally is served to men.

== Customs ==
The word inyama yenhloko means "head meat" in isiZulu. The symbolism behind inyama yenhloko is that since men are the heads of the family, the meat is reserved for them. Traditionally the cows are usually slaughtered for big ceremonies such as weddings and funerals and the men would gather at the kraal and eat the meat placed on a flat big zinc or wood. Women were not allowed in the kraal and could not eat the inyama yenhloko.

Nowadays most young people including women enjoy the meat and it has been popular in South African and can be bought at kasi or restaurants selling South African cuisine. Taxi drivers commonly buy inyama yenhloko during the day while working at the rank.

The dish is believed by some men to increase virility. The dish is so popular that in at least one town a small business has been created to prepare the meat for making the dish by removing it from the skull. Vendors bring their cow's head to the business, which uses knives and axes to remove the meat and return it to the vendors for the next step in the preparation.

== Preparation ==
Most methods call for salted water and beef stock to be brought to a boil, the cow's head is placed into the broth, covered, and simmered for one or two hours until the meat is tender. Other methods are known.

Modern variations have been developed, including Inyama yenhloko pie, or cow lip pie.

Leftovers from inyama yenhloko are used to make cow's head soup.

It can be cooked in the style of shisanyama, or "burnt meat", a term also used to mean bringing people together.
