= Georgia Duckworth Trader =

American philanthropist (1876–1944)

- Born: January 30, 1876; Xenia, Ohio
- Died: March 12, 1944 (aged 68)
- Known for: Co-founder of the Clovernook Home for the Blind, Clovernook Braille Press, and Cincinnati Library Society for the Blind
- Relatives: Florence Bishop Trader (Sister)
- Honours: American Foundation for the Blind Migel Medal

Georgia Duckworth Trader (January 30, 1876 — March 12, 1944) was an American philanthropist, co-founder of Clovernook, a home for blind women, Clovernook Braille Press, and of the Cincinnati Library Society for the Blind.

== Early life ==
Georgia Duckworth Trader was born in Xenia, Ohio, the daughter of James Franklin Trader and Elizabeth Jane Duckworth Trader. Both of her parents were born in Ohio. She attended Miss Armstrong's School for Girls in Cincinnati, Ohio. She lost her eyesight at age 11 after an unsuccessful surgery.

== Career ==
Trader and her sister Florence Bishop Trader taught braille classes at the Cincinnati Public Library, and established the Cincinnati Library Society for the Blind in 1901. They expanded this work in 1903 when they opened the Clovernook Home for the Blind, in the home previously owned by poet sisters Phoebe Cary and Alice Cary in what is now North College Hill, Ohio near Cincinnati. Among the major benefactors of their work were Cincinnati mayor Murray Seasongood, and William Cooper Procter, of the family that founded Procter & Gamble. Clovernook soon had weaving and Braille printing shops for vocational training and fundraising.

The Cincinnati public schools added provisions for blind students and for vision screening, as a result of the Trader sisters' work, in 1905. In 1944, soon after the death of Georgia Duckworth Trader, the Trader sisters were honored by the American Foundation for the Blind with the Migel Medal for their contributions to improving blind people's lives.

Clovernook Braille Press was printing sixty million Braille pages a year in 1946, including nine monthly magazines, making it one of the largest braille presses in the United States. Georgia Trader was an enthusiastic bridge player, and devised a marked card deck for blind players based on her own interests, which was printed by the Clovernook Press along with a braille rule book.

== Personal life ==
Georgia Duckworth Trader died in 1944, aged 66 years. The Georgia D. Trader Memorial Fund was established by her surviving sisters to support the work of Clovernook. Today Clovernook continues as a nonprofit center with educational, vocational, and recreational programming for the blind community of greater Cincinnati. The publishing house at Clovernook continues to be one of the larger publishers for blind readers.
