= Florence Bishop Trader =

American philanthropist (1878–1964)

- Born: 19 August 1878; Xenia, Ohio
- Died: 22 February 1964
- Known for: Blind philanthropy

Florence Bishop Trader (August 19, 1878 — February 22, 1964) was an American philanthropist, founder of Clovernook, a residential training school for blind girls and women, and of the Cincinnati Library Society for the Blind.

== Early life ==
Florence Bishop Trader was born in Xenia, Ohio, the daughter of James Franklin Trader and Elizabeth Jane Duckworth Trader. Both of her parents were born in Ohio. She attended Miss Armstrong's School for Girls in Cincinnati, Ohio.

== Career ==
Florence and her sister Georgia Duckworth Trader, who was blind, taught braille classes at the Cincinnati Public Library, and established the Cincinnati Library Society for the Blind in 1901. They expanded this work in 1903 when they opened the Clovernook Home for the Blind, in the home previously owned by poet sisters Phoebe Cary and Alice Cary in what is now North College Hill, Ohio near Cincinnati. Among the major benefactors of their work were Cincinnati mayor Murray Seasongood, and William Cooper Procter, of the family that founded Procter & Gamble. Clovernook soon had weaving and braille printing shops for vocational training and fundraising.

The Cincinnati public schools added provisions for blind students and for preventive vision screenings, as a result of the Trader sisters' work, in 1905. In 1944, the Trader sisters were honored by the American Foundation for the Blind with the Migel Medal for their contributions to improving blind people's lives in the United States. Clovernook Braille Press was printing sixty million Braille pages a year in 1946, including nine monthly magazines, making it one of the largest braille presses in the United States.

== Personal life and legacy ==
Florence Bishop Trader died in 1964, aged 85 years. Before she died, in 1958, Clovernook became a nonprofit organization, and continues today as a center for educational, vocational, and recreational services for the blind community of greater Cincinnati. The publishing house at Clovernook continues to be one of the larger publishers for blind readers.
