= Mary C. Ames =

American journalist, author, and poet

Mary Clemmer Hudson
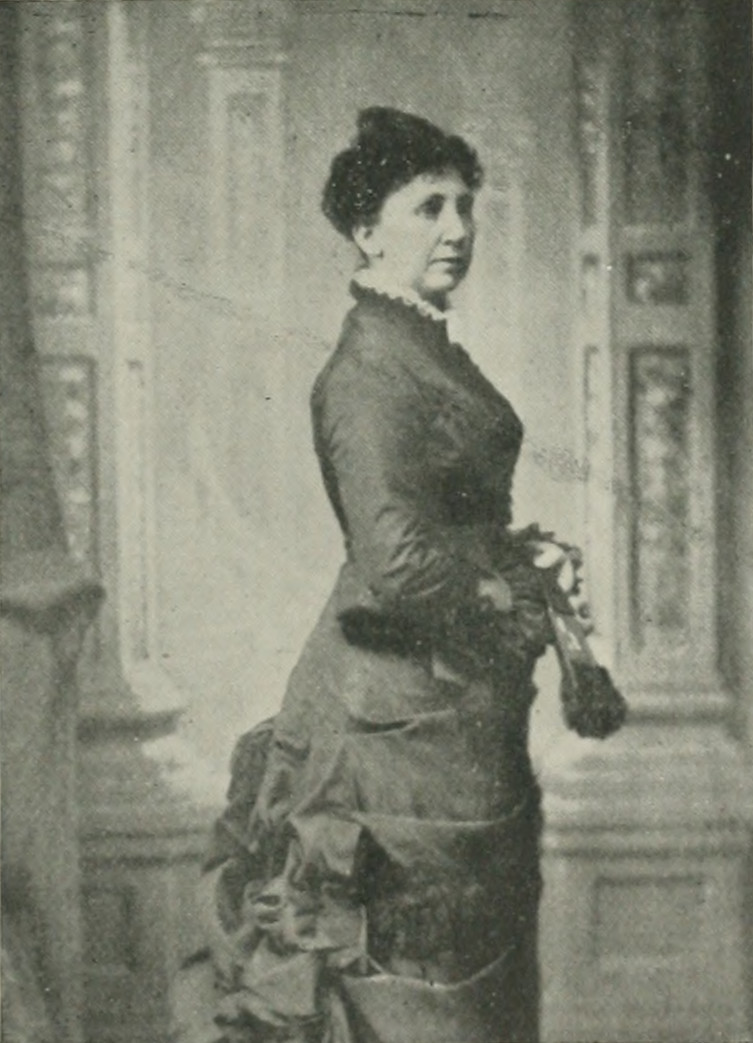
- "A Woman of the Century"
- Born: Mary Estella Clemmer; May 6, 1831; Utica, New York, U.S.
- Died: August 18, 1884 (aged 53)
- Resting place: Rock Creek Cemetery; Washington, D.C., U.S.
- Education: Westfield Academy
- Occupations: Journalist; author; poet
- Spouses: Daniel Ames (m. 1851; ann. 1874) Edmund Hudson (m. 1883)
- Writing career
- Language: English

Mary C. Ames (sometimes referred to as Mrs. Mary Clemmer; after second marriage, Mrs. Edmund Hudson; May 6, 1831 – August 18, 1884) was a 19th-century American journalist, author, and poet. She wrote poetry and prose, including novels. Her complete works were published at Boston (four volumes, 1885). She gained newspaper experience with the Springfield Republican, the New York Press (1865), and the Brooklyn Daily Union (1869–71). In 1871, she earned US$5,000 for her work, the largest salary ever paid a newspaper woman up to that time. In later life, she moved to Washington, D.C., where her home was a literary and social centre, and on June 19, 1883, she married Edmund Hudson, editor of the Army and Navy Register. She became best known for her "Woman's Letter from Washington", which she contributed for many years to the New York Independent.

== Early years and education ==
Mary Estella Clemmer was born in Utica, New York, on May 6, 1831. The oldest of seven children, her ancestors on both sides came from famous families. Abraham Clemmer, her father, a native of Pennsylvania, was of Huguenot descent. The Clemmer family traced their origin to Alsace, France, on the borders of Germany. Their name in France had been spelled Klemmer. In 1685, when Louis XIV pushed his persecutions of the Huguenots past the borders of France into the very heart of Germany, the Clemmer family fled to the United States. They settled in Berks County, Pennsylvania, before the American Revolution. Margaret Kneale, her mother, was a descendant of the Crains, a well-known family of the Isle of Man, who trace a direct line back to 1600. Ames was one of a large family of children, two brothers and four sisters.

As a child, Ames would compose rhymes and repeat them to herself, long before she learned to write. When Ames was a young woman, Abraham Clemmer moved his family to Westfield, Massachusetts, where two brothers of his wife, one Hon. Thomas Kneale, had already settled.

Ames entered Westfield Academy, one of whose early teachers was Emma Willard. The principal of the school, William C. Goldthwaite, took great interest in this young girl, and paid special attention to her education. While a student in the Westfield Academy, her first line in verse was put into print. Read as a school exercise, it pleased one of her teachers, Samuel Davis, sufficiently to impel him to send it to his friend, Samuel Bowles, who printed it in the Springfield Republican.

== Career ==
=== Child bride ===
On May 7, 1851, at the age of seventeen, Ames married the Reverend Daniel Ames, who was many years her senior. She likely married him to escape an unhappy home life. During the marriage, Ames temporarily resided in Massachusetts, Minnesota, New York and, during the American Civil War, in Harper's Ferry, Virginia. While living in New York City, her first essay was made in the columns of the Utica Morning Herald, to which she contributed a series of letters from New York.

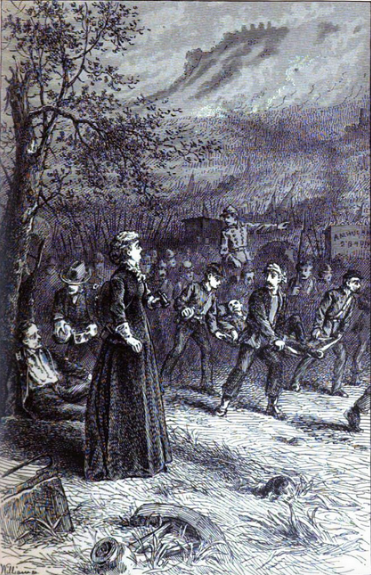
Illustration of the retreat at the Battle of Maryland Heights

When the war came, Ames was literally in it. In her novel Eirene, the chapter on the "Surrender of Maryland Heights" was written from personal experience and personal observation. At that time Eirene was running as a serial in Putnam's Monthly, and this vivid and graphic picture of a war event was widely copied by the press of that day, and was reproduced in Littell's Living Age, and in the London Athenaeum.

=== After the Civil War ===
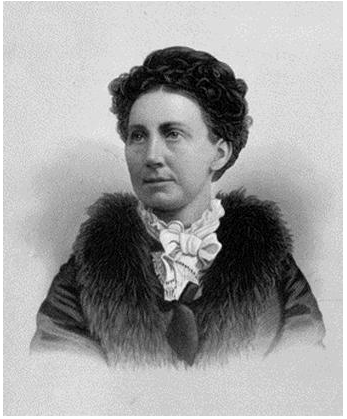
Mary Clemmer Ames

From 1866 to 1869, Ames resided in Washington, D.C. doing regular work in the way of "Women's Letters from Washington" for the New York Independent. In the spring of 1866, Ames wrote from Washington her first letter to the Independent. From then on, few weeks passed during the congressional sessions that she did not contribute to that journal. "A Woman's Letter from Washington" was significant of refined culture, strong in political characterization, and was apt to photograph pretty clearly politicians, parties, and principles for the delectation of the reading public. In brief, these letters treated topics of thought rather than the mere surfaces of things. The years that Ames passed at the national capital were to her varied, eventful, rich in experiences. Her first sustained work there comprised seven newspaper letters each week. She passed long mornings in the ladies' gallery of the Senate or of the Hall of Representatives. Nothing about her, not even a scrap of a note-book or pencil, indicated the professional listener. The letters being of an editorial rather than of a reportorial nature, did not require her to appear in the outward idle of a correspondent. Returning to her rooms, she sent the long letters and telegraphic matter by a messenger who came for them. In the evening, she held herself free to receive friends, or for social engagements. In her parlours might have been found the most eminent men of the day. The esteem in which Ames' work was held was indicated in two impromptu notes written in the Senate Chamber by Charles Sumner. One of these bears no date save that of the day of the week. Written at his desk and handed by a page to Ames in the ladies' gallery. That trust was fulfilled, and for the years following this date to that of his death the honoured Massachusetts Senator and Ames were warm personal friends.

In 1869, she engaged for three years' work on the Brooklyn Daily Union, and for the third year's work of that engagement, she received a salary of US$5,000, the largest sum ever paid to a newspaper woman for one year's labor up to that time.

In the years since then, Ames became widely known as a poet and novelist. The decade between 1870 and 1880 were years in which Ames achieved a great amount of creative work. Journalistic correspondence, novels, poems, and Ten Years in Washington, (Hartford, 1870). This work, which in its quantity and quality was enough in itself to absorb the entire time and energies of its author, was really the achievement of a crowded life, which included the society functions of the day.

In October, 1872, Ames completed, Memorial of Alice and Phebe Cary, the biography of the Cary sisters, a work which long intimacy and residence in their home had peculiarly fitted her to undertake. It is in this book that Ames pays a tribute to Alice Cary, as the one friend of her life. In this biography, and especially in depicting the life and character of Alice Cary, Ames did some of her most perfect literary work. Also, in 1872, she resumed her work on the New York Independent.

Her marriage was legally annulled in 1874. In the same year, His Two Wives, which appeared first as a serial in the Boston publication, Every Saturday, was a work of unusual power. The request had been urged upon Ames to contribute a serial story to Every Saturday. Declining at first, because of the time element, she undertook the work, giving to it simply the Friday afternoon of each week, sending the chapters just as they flowed from her pen. When the story was published in book-form it was made up, simply, from the pages of Every Saturday, without revision from the author. The story, which was unique in treatment, and which set itself like a series of pictures in the memory, was rendered a remarkable production when the circumstances under which it was written were considered.

=== Carriage injury ===
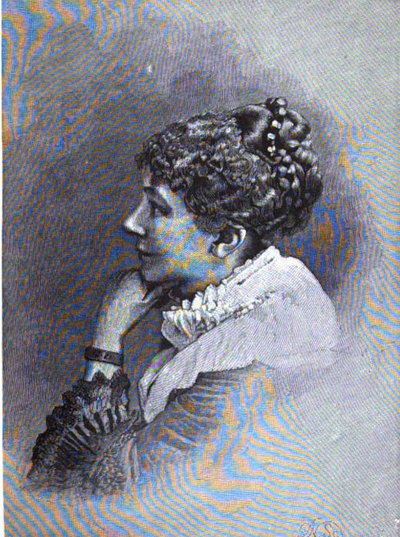
Mary Clemmer

In January 1879, while in Washington, she suffered a serious injury. Thinking that the horses behind which she was riding were running away, she jumped from the carriage, striking her head against the curbing, which caused a fracture of the skull. Medical aid was powerless, and she suffered intensely, getting but little relief during the remaining six years which she lived.

In 1882, her poems were collected and published under the title, A Volume of Poems. As a poet, Ames touched chords to which the response has been peculiarly sympathetic. In this phase of creative work she has made herself the interpreter of two distinct forces, the life of nature and the emotions of the human heart. Her utterances were strongly subjective, yet much of it was from the material of imagination, and sympathetic rather than of real or of personal experience. A forcible instance of this was in the poem entitled "The Dead Love," which upon its appearance in her volume of Poems of Life and Nature, was greeted by critics, as "written from the depths of her own experience," whereas it was really written when she was a young girl, with no experience of love, living or dead, and was a sympathetic response to a girl-friend whose painful experience she thus interpreted. In the "Good-by, Sweetheart," Ames reached her highest lyric force. Her "Arbutus" was characterized as having oneness of her soul with nature, a harmony that was again interpreted in the two sonnets entitled "The Cathedral Pines," written one summer day at Intervale, New Hampshire.

== Personal life ==
Ames' home, a large, brick mansion, was located on Capitol Hill, in Washington, D.C.

On June 19, 1883, she married Edmund Hudson, the journalist, and they immediately went to Europe. The journey was a delightful one to her, but her strength was constantly diminishing, and in November they returned to the United States. Then followed a long illness, which resulted in her death of a cerebral haemorrhage, in Washington D.C. on August 18, 1884. She was buried at Rock Creek Cemetery, Washington D.C.

== Selected works ==
- Victoire (1864)
- Eirene; or A Woman's Right (1870)
- Ten Years in Washington (1871)
- Outlines of Men, Women, and Things (1873)
- His Two Wives (1874)
- Memorials of Alice and Phœbe Cary (twenty-sixth edition, 1885)
- Poems of Life and Nature (1886)
