= North College Hill, Ohio =

- City
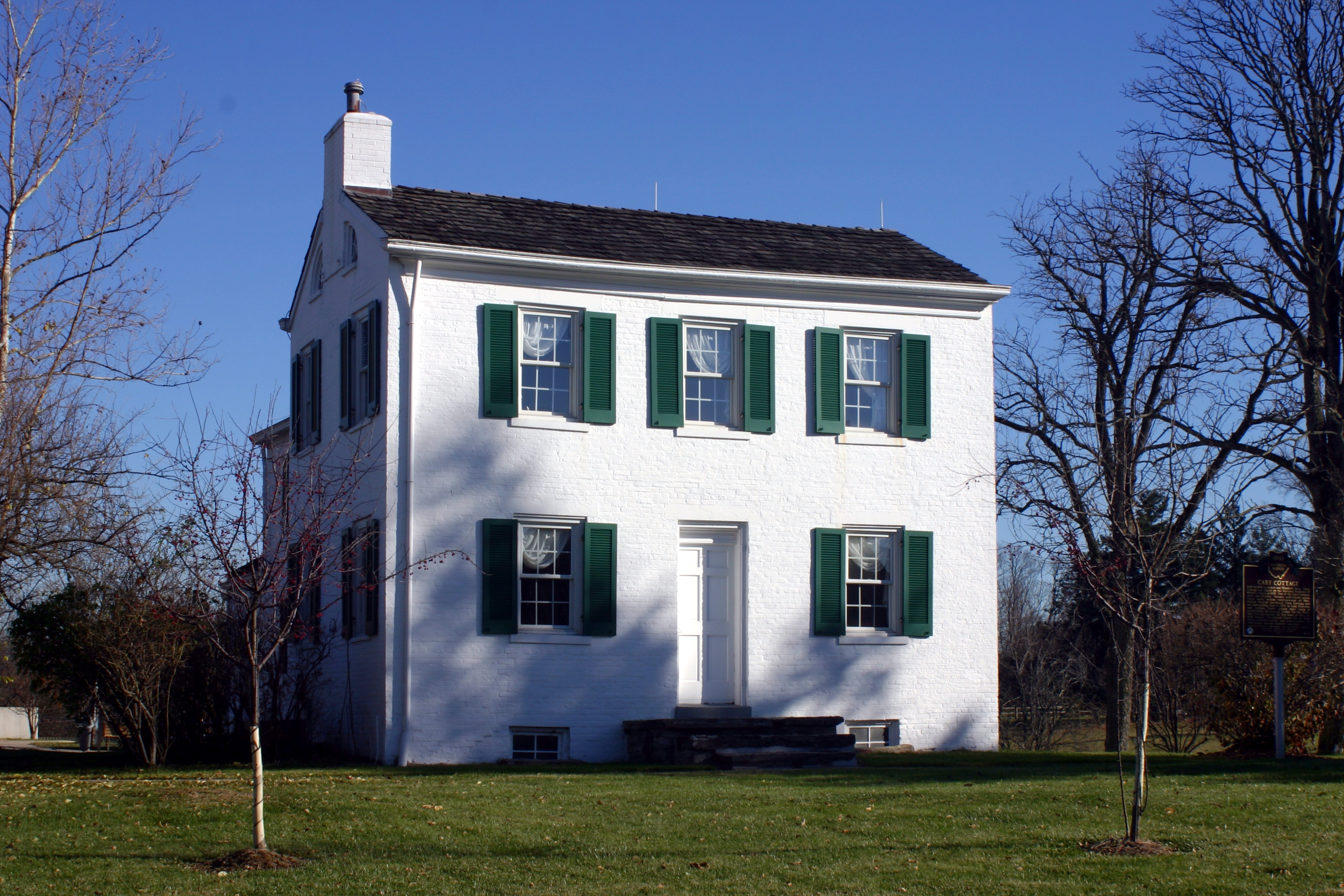
- Clovernook, childhood home of poets Alice and Phoebe Cary

- Flag Logo
- Interactive map of North College Hill, Ohio
- Location within Ohio Location within the United States
- Coordinates: 39°13′03″N 84°33′07″W
- Country: United States
- State: Ohio
- County: Hamilton

Government
  - Mayor: Tracie Nichols (D)

Area
  - Total: 1.83 sq mi (4.73 km^{2})
  - Land: 1.82 sq mi (4.72 km^{2})
  - Water: 0.0039 sq mi (0.01 km^{2})
- Elevation: 824 ft (251 m)

Population (2020)
  - Total: 9,663
  - Estimate (2022): 9,484
  - Density: 5,307.8/sq mi (2,049.35/km^{2})
- Time zone: UTC-5 (Eastern (EST))
  - Summer (DST): UTC-4 (EDT)
- ZIP codes: 45224, 45239, 45231
- Area code: 513
- FIPS code: 39-56322
- GNIS feature ID: 1086223
- Website: www.northcollegehill.org

North College Hill is a city in Hamilton County, Ohio, United States. The population was 9,663 at the 2020 census. Located about 10 miles (16 km) north of downtown Cincinnati, the city takes its name from its proximity to the Cincinnati neighborhood of College Hill (formerly Pleasant Hill), which borders it to the south.

== History ==
One of the first easterners to survey the area was John Cleves Symmes, a judge and former Congressman from New Jersey, after whom Symmes Township is named. Symmes visited the area in 1787 and received tentative permission from the new Federal government to purchase a section of land between the Little Miami and Great Miami Rivers. This tract became known as the “Symmes Purchase” or “Miami Purchase” and extended south to the Ohio River.

Several of the pioneers who migrated across the midwest to claim a part of Symmes' tract are buried in North College Hill's oldest landmark, the LaBoiteaux-Cary cemetery. Established in approximately 1806, the cemetery includes the graves of two Revolutionary War veterans and several members of the Cary family. The last burial in the cemetery was in 1860.

=== Cary family ===
In 1813–14, William Cary, having migrated from New Hampshire to Cincinnati in 1802, purchased 491 acres (1.99 km^{2}) north of Cincinnati along what is now Hamilton Avenue (U.S. Route 127). Cary built a log cabin and moved his family to this “wilderness,” then known as Mill Creek Township.

Soon after, William Cary purchased an additional 75 acres (300,000 m^{2}) north of North Bend Road adjacent to his original tract, and sold part of it to his nephew Robert Cary. Robert called the land Clovernook Farm and initially erected a small frame house for his family. In 1832, he built the white, brick house now known as Cary Cottage (see photo) which stands on the campus of the Clovernook Center for the Blind and Visually Impaired and is listed on the National Register of Historic Places. Within a year of his settlement, Robert also laid out the first community in the area, called Clovernook, on the east side of Hamilton Avenue.

Robert Cary and his wife Elizabeth raised nine children, two of whom, Alice and Phoebe, became well-known poets and writers. Both girls began having their poems published as teenagers, and they eventually counted among their admirers Massachusetts poet and abolitionist John Greenleaf Whittier, New York Tribune newspaper editor Horace Greeley, and author Edgar Allan Poe, who pronounced Alice Cary's Pictures of Memory, "one of the most musically perfect lyrics in the English language".

Cary Cottage became the first home for blind women in Ohio through the work of the Trader sisters, Florence and Georgia (who was blind). In 1903 the Cary house and the land surrounding it were purchased by William Procter, grandson of the Procter & Gamble co-founder, in order to give them in trust to the Traders. The sisters used the land to establish the Clovernook home and provide employment to visually impaired women as a source of dignity and direction. Today, the Clovernook Center for the Blind and Visually Impaired offers instruction, employment, community living and low vision services for men and women, and runs three manufacturing departments, including one of the world's largest volume producers of Braille publications.

=== Religious and legal reform ===
==== Isaac Mayer Wise ====
In the latter part of the nineteenth century, North College Hill was the home of Dr. Isaac Mayer Wise, who has been called “the most prominent Jew of his time in the United States” for his influence as one of the early leaders of Reform Judaism in America.

In 1861, Wise and his wife Therese bought a house and 42-acre (170,000 m^{2}) farm near the current intersection of Goodman and Hamilton Avenues, where they raised a family of ten children. Wise added to the original farmhouse until it included 13 rooms on various levels. The farm, meanwhile, allowed him to carry out agricultural experiments and to enjoy the opportunity to own his own land.

A park near the site of his former farm was dedicated to Wise. In 2022, the park was renovated and re-dedicated.

==== Tumey v. Ohio ====
In 1925, North College Hill Mayor A. R. Pugh was involved in a Prohibition case. Ohio law allowed small towns like North College Hill to operate "liquor courts". These courts had authority over their entire county. Further, the Crabbe Act allowed local towns, mayors, and police departments to keep at least some of the fines imposed by these courts. In Tumey v. Ohio (1927), the U.S. Supreme Court ruled the Crabbe Act was unconstitutional as financial conflicts of interest impaired the right to a fair trial. The court's decision in this case continues to provide precedent today in cases involving judicial impartiality.

=== Development of a community ===
Through the nineteenth century, as College Hill to the south and Mount Healthy to the north matured into towns, the area that was to become North College Hill remained largely farmland. Beginning in 1905, saw mill owner John Meyer used his surplus lumber to build a subdivision of small homes north of Galbraith Road and west of Hamilton Avenue and called it Meyerville. Within the next ten years, two other groups of homes – Clovernook, east of Hamilton Avenue, and Sunshine, south of Galbraith and west of Hamilton – were started. The three subdivisions, with a total of about 500 residents, were incorporated as the Village of North College Hill in 1916.

As the automobile stretched commuting distances, the village's affordable housing attracted a growing population, and it increased from about 1,100 to 4,100 residents during the 1920s. In 1941, the village incorporated as a City and continued to grow until the population stabilized at its peak of around 12,000 by 1960. A few homes were removed for the completion of Ronald Reagan Cross County Highway (Ohio State Route 126) in 1997. Population has declined more or less steadily over the past four decades, according to the U.S. Census: 1970 12,363; 1980 10,990; 1990 11,002; 2000 10,082; 2010 9,397.

In 2007, Money magazine listed the city sixth among places "where homes are affordable". On November 6, 2007 a ballot initiative to make North College Hill a charter city was passed by the voters. In 2011 North College Hill was rated the "best place to raise kids in Ohio" by Bloomberg Businessweek, based on such factors as school performance, the number of schools, crime statistics, cost of living, job growth, air quality, ethnic diversity, and access to recreational facilities.

== Geography ==
According to the United States Census Bureau, the city has a total area of 1.83 square miles (4.74 km^{2}), all land.

== Demographics ==
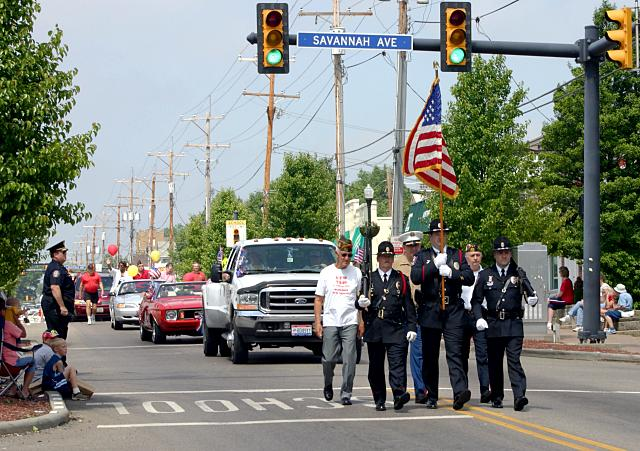
Memorial Day parade in North College Hill

Historical population
Census	Pop.	Note	%±
1920	1,104		—
1930	4,139		274.9%
1940	5,231		26.4%
1950	7,921		51.4%
1960	12,035		51.9%
1970	12,363		2.7%
1980	11,114		−10.1%
1990	11,002		−1.0%
2000	10,082		−8.4%
2010	9,397		−6.8%
2020	9,663		2.8%
2022 (est.)	9,484		−1.9%

=== Racial and ethnic composition ===
North College Hill city, Ohio – Racial and ethnic composition Note: the US Census treats Hispanic/Latino as an ethnic category. This table excludes Latinos from the racial categories and assigns them to a separate category. Hispanics/Latinos may be of any race.
Race / Ethnicity (NH = Non-Hispanic)	Pop 2000	Pop 2010	Pop 2020	% 2000	% 2010	% 2020
White alone (NH)	7,647	4,542	3,141	75.85%	48.33%	32.51%
Black or African American alone (NH)	2,182	4,365	5,633	21.64%	46.45%	58.29%
Native American or Alaska Native alone (NH)	23	12	21	0.23%	0.13%	0.22%
Asian alone (NH)	24	53	68	0.24%	0.56%	0.70%
Native Hawaiian or Pacific Islander alone (NH)	1	6	8	0.01%	0.06%	0.08%
Other Race alone (NH)	33	15	57	0.33%	0.16%	0.59%
Mixed race or Multiracial (NH)	113	279	490	1.12%	2.97%	5.07%
Hispanic or Latino (any race)	59	125	245	0.59%	1.33%	2.54%
Total	10,082	9,397	9,663	100.00%	100.00%	100.00%

=== 2020 census ===
As of the 2020 census, there were 9,663 people living in the city, for a population density of 5,306.43 people per square mile (2,049.35/km^{2}).

The median age was 37.4 years. 24.7% of residents were under the age of 18 and 13.8% of residents were 65 years of age or older. For every 100 females there were 82.2 males, and for every 100 females age 18 and over there were 78.4 males age 18 and over.

There were 3,955 households in North College Hill, of which 30.9% had children under the age of 18 living in them. Of all households, 27.8% were married-couple households, 20.7% were households with a male householder and no spouse or partner present, and 44.3% were households with a female householder and no spouse or partner present. About 34.3% of all households were made up of individuals and 10.9% had someone living alone who was 65 years of age or older. The average household size was 2.71, and the average family size was 3.40. There were 4,247 housing units, of which 6.9% were vacant. The homeowner vacancy rate was 1.9% and the rental vacancy rate was 6.2%.

100.0% of residents lived in urban areas, while 0.0% lived in rural areas.

According to the U.S. Census American Community Survey, for the period 2016-2020 the estimated median annual income for a household in the city was $51,120, and the median income for a family was $56,504. About 25.3% of the population were living below the poverty line, including 40.7% of those under age 18 and 10.3% of those age 65 or over. About 61.7% of the population were employed, and 19.2% had a bachelor's degree or higher.

=== 2010 census ===
As of the census of 2010, there were 9,397 people, 3,848 households, and 2,325 families residing in the city. The population density was 5,135.0 inhabitants per square mile (1,982.6/km^{2}). There were 4,267 housing units at an average density of 2,331.7 per square mile (900.3/km^{2}). The racial makeup of the city was 49.0% White, 46.6% African American, 0.1% Native American, 0.6% Asian, 0.1% Pacific Islander, 0.4% from other races, and 3.2% from two or more races. Hispanic or Latino of any race were 1.3% of the population.

There were 3,848 households, of which 32.9% had children under the age of 18 living with them, 32.9% were married couples living together, 21.6% had a female householder with no husband present, 6.0% had a male householder with no wife present, and 39.6% were non-families. 33.5% of all households were made up of individuals, and 9.9% had someone living alone who was 65 years of age or older. The average household size was 2.39 and the average family size was 3.05.

The median age in the city was 36.2 years. 25.3% of residents were under the age of 18; 9% were between the ages of 18 and 24; 27.9% were from 25 to 44; 25.7% were from 45 to 64; and 12.1% were 65 years of age or older. The gender makeup of the city was 47.3% male and 52.7% female.

=== 2000 census ===
As of the census of 2000, there were 10,082 people, 4,191 households, and 2,535 families residing in the city. The population density was 5,491.0 inhabitants per square mile (2,120.1/km^{2}). There were 4,488 housing units at an average density of 2,444.3 per square mile (943.7/km^{2}). The racial makeup of the city was 76.20% White, 21.69% African American, 0.23% Native American, 0.26% Asian, 0.01% Pacific Islander, 0.47% from other races, and 1.15% from two or more races. Hispanic or Latino of any race were 0.59% of the population.

There were 4,191 households, out of which 30.2% had children under the age of 18 living with them, 42.2% were married couples living together, 14.9% had a female householder with no husband present, and 39.5% were non-families. 34.4% of all households were made up of individuals, and 14.4% had someone living alone who was 65 years of age or older. The average household size was 2.33 and the average family size was 3.03.

In the city the population was spread out, with 25.5% under the age of 18, 7.5% from 18 to 24, 31.5% from 25 to 44, 17.5% from 45 to 64, and 18.0% who were 65 years of age or older. The median age was 36 years. For every 100 females, there were 85.3 males. For every 100 females age 18 and over, there were 78.9 males.

The median income for a household in the city was $37,776, and the median income for a family was $45,149. Males had a median income of $31,964 versus $27,710 for females. The per capita income for the city was $18,915. About 6.8% of families and 8.7% of the population were below the poverty line, including 11.5% of those under age 18 and 10.3% of those age 65 or over.

== Government ==
=== Mayors of North College Hill ===
From 1941 to 1966, the mayoral term was two years. The term was extended to four years in 1967.

No.	Name	Start day and month	Start year	End day and month	End year	Time in office	Political Party
1	Edward C. Ahlers	January 1	1942	December 31	1943	2 years	Democratic
2	John J. Tomkins	January 1	1944	December 31	1947	4 years	Democratic
3	Robert J. Reuss	January 1	1948	December 31	1959	12 years	Republican
4	Frank X. Niehaus	January 1	1960	December 31	1963	4 years	Democratic
5	Robert Borneman	January 1	1964	December 31	1965	2 years	Republican
6	Joseph G. Binder	January 1	1966	December 31	1967	2 years	Democratic
7	Robert Borneman	January 1	1968	December 31	1971	4 years	Republican
8	Charles W. Pieper	January 1	1972	December 31	1975	4 years	Republican
9	Joseph G. Binder	January 1	1976	December 31	1979	4 years	Democratic
10	Charles L. Woeste	January 1	1980	November 18	1983	3 years, 10 months, 18 days	Republican
11	Charlotte H. Kunkel	November 19	1983	December 31	1983	43 days	Republican
12	Daniel R. Brooks	January 1	1984	December 21	2013	29 years, 11 months, and 20 days	Democratic
13	Amy A. Bancroft	December 26	2013	September 21	2015	1 year, 8 months, 27 days	Democratic
14	Maureen Mason	October 5	2015	December 31	2019	4 years, 2 months, and 26 days	Democratic
15	Tracie Nichols	January 1	2020			6 years, 256 days	Democratic

== See also ==
- North College Hill High School
- Clovernook
