= Harriot Kezia Hunt =

American physician

Harriot Hunt
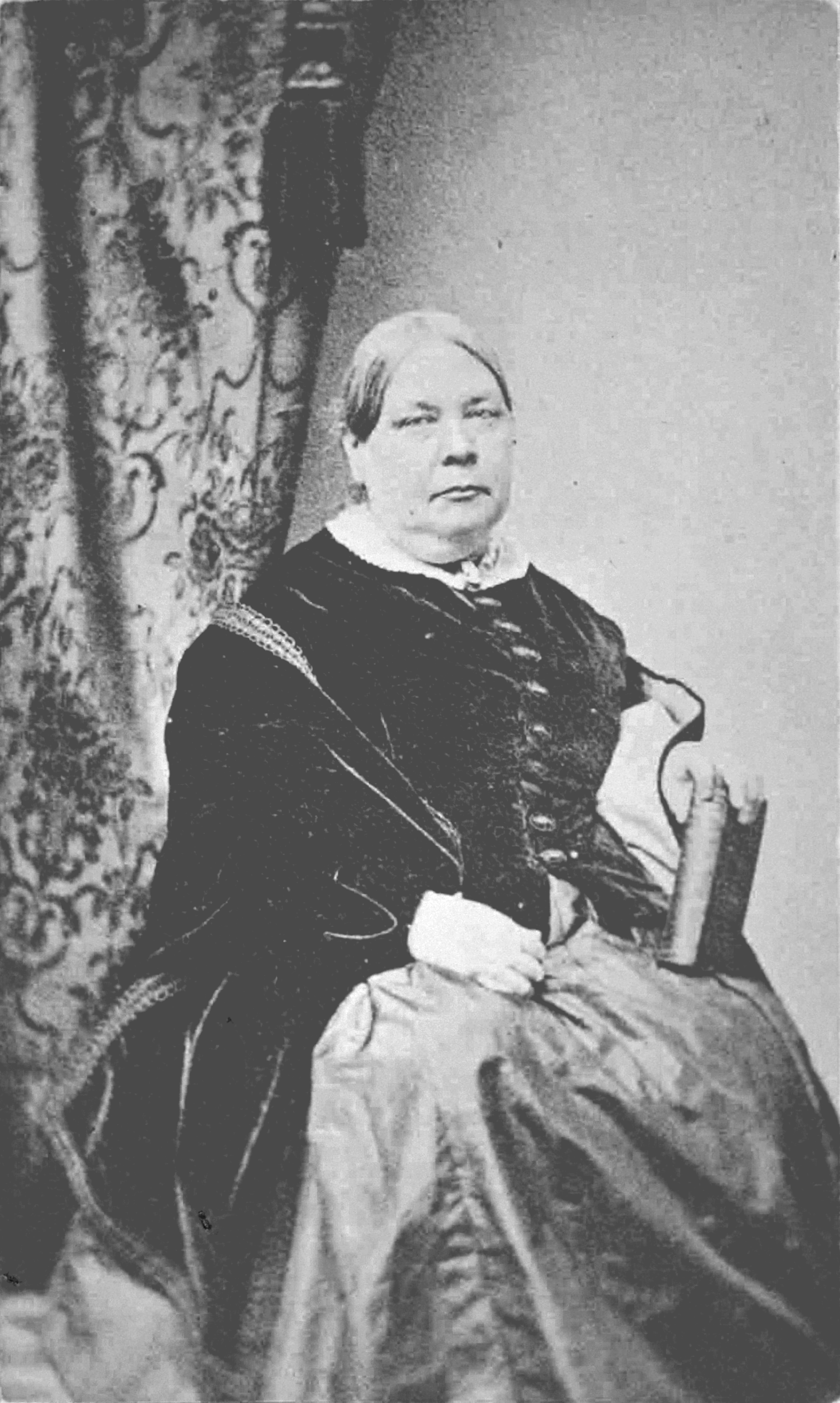
- Harriot Kezia Hunt, from a 1910 publication.
- Born: November 9, 1805; Boston, Massachusetts, US
- Died: January 2, 1875 (aged 69); Boston, Massachusetts, US
- Resting place: Mount Auburn Cemetery
- Education: Women's Medical College of Pennsylvania, honorary M.D.
- Occupations: Teacher; Medical doctor Women's rights activist

Harriot Kezia Hunt (November 9, 1805 – January 2, 1875) was an American medical doctor and women's rights activist. She spoke at the first National Women's Rights Conventions, held in 1850 in Worcester, Massachusetts.

== Early life ==
Hunt was born in Boston, Massachusetts, in 1805, the daughter of Joab Hunt and Kezia Wentworth Hunt. She was educated at home by her parents. Hunt's father died in 1827, leaving the family without financial support. Harriot Hunt and her sister, Sarah Hunt, opened a private school in their home in order to be self-sufficient. Though teaching brought in money, Hunt reportedly felt it was not what she wanted to do with her life.

Sarah Hunt soon fell ill and was unable to recover with the treatment offered by conventional doctors. Dr. Richard Dixon Mott was invited to treat Sarah. It was after this that Hunt began studying medicine under Elizabeth Mott and Dr. Mott in 1833. Rather than using the common methods of the time, the Motts used rest and relaxation as well as herbal remedies to help strengthen and cure patients. Hunt benefited greatly through clinical observation while working with Elizabeth Mott, who generally oversaw most of Dr. Mott's female patients. In 1835 Hunt opened her own consulting room, without a medical diploma.

== Education and practice ==
In 1847, Hunt became the first woman to apply to Harvard Medical School. Dr. Oliver Wendell Holmes Sr. had recently been made Dean of the school and initially considered accepting her application. He was heavily criticized by the all-male student body as well as the university overseers and other faculty members, and she was asked to withdraw her application. Shortly after Elizabeth Blackwell's graduation from Geneva College in 1849, Hunt applied to Harvard again, but was denied. In the years following Hunt's application and denial, other women continued to be denied as well. It wasn't until 1945 that Harvard Medical School admitted its first class of women in a 10-year trial to measure productivity and accomplishment of women both during and after medical schooling. This class of women was admitted due to the decreased amount of qualified male applicants as a result of World War II. Despite not being accepted to Harvard after her second application, Hunt continued to practice medicine on her own. She became so widely known that in 1853 she received an Honorary Doctor of Medicine from the Female Medical College of Pennsylvania.

Hunt was criticized throughout her years of medical practice, particularly from those who believed her profession was unsuitable for women. One New York Times article in 1858 criticized her for being "one of the dozen women in the United States who pine because Nature did not make them men." However, Hunt believed that femininity made women especially suited for the medical profession. As she asked, "What could be more delicately feminine, more truly womanly, than to take the hand of a sister, afflicted in body and mind, and to show her the cause of her diseases?"

Hunt was a vocal advocate for the right of women to both learn and practice medicine and, more generally, to be educated and seek professions. She believed she was living in an "age of transition," as she called it, where people were beginning to question societal traditions. In 1843, Hunt founded the Ladies In Physiology Society. She gave lectures on physiology and hygiene. In 1850, she attended the National Women's Rights Convention in Worcester, Massachusetts. For a number of years, Hunt spent her time lecturing on the abolition of slavery as well as women's rights. Much of her career is described in her memoirs, Glances and Glimpses; or, Fifty Years' Social, Including Twenty Years' Professional Life (Boston: J.P. Jewett and Company, 1856).

In 1860, Hunt celebrated the twenty-fifth anniversary of her medical practice with a party of 1500 guests, including three generations of her patients. At the event, she reportedly offered her advice to women: "I have been so happy in my work; every moment occupied; how I long to whisper it in the ear of every listless woman, 'do something, if you would be happy.'"

== Death and legacy ==
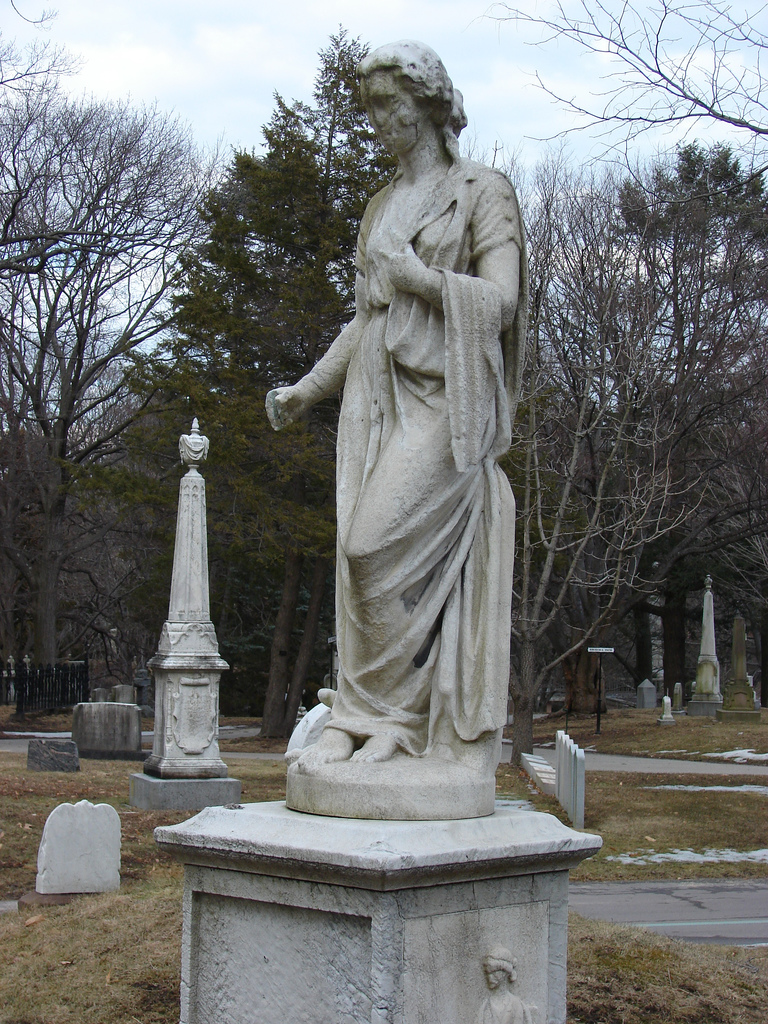
Hygeia, the Greek goddess of health, carved by Edmonia Lewis c. 1871-1872 for Harriot Hunt's grave

Hunt died in Boston on January 2, 1875, at the age of 69. She was buried in Mount Auburn Cemetery, near Boston. Her grave is marked by a statue of the Greek goddess of health, Hygeia, carved by the African American sculptor Edmonia Lewis.

The first volume of History of Woman Suffrage, published in 1881, states, “THESE VOLUMES ARE AFFECTIONATELY INSCRIBED TO THE Memory of Mary Wollstonecraft, Frances Wright, Lucretia Mott, Harriet Martineau, Lydia Maria Child, Margaret Fuller, Sarah and Angelina Grimké, Josephine S. Griffing, Martha C. Wright, Harriot K. Hunt, M.D., Mariana W. Johnson, Alice and Phebe Carey, Ann Preston, M.D., Lydia Mott, Eliza W. Farnham, Lydia F. Fowler, M.D., Paulina Wright Davis, Whose Earnest Lives and Fearless Words, in Demanding Political Rights for Women, have been, in the Preparation of these Pages, a Constant Inspiration TO The Editors”.

Hunt is commemorated on the Boston Women's Heritage Trail, and on a plaque on the left wall of Paul Revere Mall.

She is also the namesake of the Women's Pro Baseball League team the Boston Hunters.
