= Paulina Wright Davis =

American activist and educator (1813–1876)

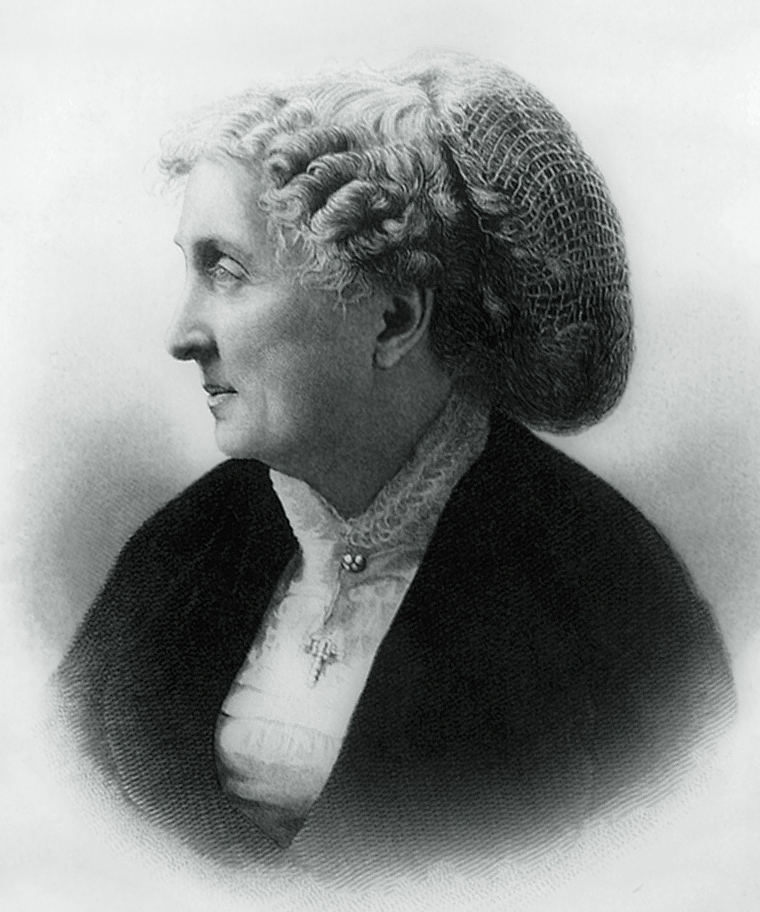
- Born: Paulina Kellogg; August 7, 1813; Bloomfield, New York, U.S.
- Died: August 24, 1876 (aged 63); Providence, Rhode Island, U.S.
- Occupations: Suffragist; Abolitionist; Educator
- Spouses: Francis Wright (m. 1833; died 1845); Thomas Davis (m. 1849)
- Children: 2 (adopted)

Paulina Wright Davis (née Kellogg; August 7, 1813 – August 24, 1876) was an American abolitionist, suffragist, and educator. She was one of the founders of the New England Woman Suffrage Association.

== Early life ==
Davis was born in Bloomfield, New York, to Captain Ebenezer Kellogg and Polly (née Saxton) Kellogg. The family moved to the frontier near Niagara Falls in 1817. Both her parents died, and she went to live with her aunt in 1820 in Le Roy, New York. She joined the Presbyterian church, although she found it hostile to outspoken women. She wanted to become a missionary, but the church did not allow single women to become missionaries.

== Later life ==
Davis married Francis Wright in 1833, who was a merchant from a prosperous family from Utica, New York. They had similar values and both resigned from their church to protest its pro-slavery stance, and they served on the executive committee of the Central New York Anti-Slavery Society. In 1835, Davis and her husband organized an anti-slavery convention in Utica. They also supported women's rights reforms, associating with Susan B. Anthony, Elizabeth Cady Stanton, and Ernestine Rose. During this period, Davis studied women's health. Francis Wright died in 1845, and the couple had no children.

Davis moved to New York to study medicine following her husband's death. In 1846, she gave lectures on anatomy and physiology to women only. She imported a medical mannequin and toured the eastern United States teaching women and urging them to become physicians. In 1849, she married Thomas Davis, a Democrat from Providence, Rhode Island, and they adopted two daughters.

In 1850, Davis started to focus her energies on women's rights. She stopped lecturing and helped to arrange the first National Women's Rights Convention in Worcester, Massachusetts, at which she presided and delivered the opening address In her speech, she argued that women were not being afforded the constitutional protections of equal protection and due process, and that they were treated as a "disabled caste" by the government. She was president of the National Woman's Rights Central Committee from 1850 to 1858. In 1853, she began editing the women's newspaper The Una, handing over the responsibility to Caroline Healey Dall in 1855.

Davis was one of the founders of the New England Woman Suffrage Association in 1868. When the group splintered, she and Susan B. Anthony became involved in the National Woman Suffrage Association. In 1870, she arranged the twentieth anniversary of the Women's Suffrage Movement meeting and published The History of the National Woman's Rights Movement.

== Death and honors ==
Davis died on August 24, 1876, in Providence, Rhode Island, seventeen days after her 63rd birthday, and was eulogized by Elizabeth Cady Stanton.

The first volume of History of Woman Suffrage, published in 1881, states, “THESE VOLUMES ARE AFFECTIONATELY INSCRIBED TO THE Memory of Mary Wollstonecraft, Frances Wright, Lucretia Mott, Harriet Martineau, Lydia Maria Child, Margaret Fuller, Sarah and Angelina Grimké, Josephine S. Griffing, Martha C. Wright, Harriot K. Hunt, M.D., Mariana W. Johnson, Alice and Phoebe Carey, Ann Preston, M.D., Lydia Mott, Eliza W. Farnham, Lydia F. Fowler, M.D., Paulina Wright Davis, Whose Earnest Lives and Fearless Words, in Demanding Political Rights for Women, have been, in the Preparation of these Pages, a Constant Inspiration TO The Editors”.

She was inducted into the National Women’s Hall of Fame in 2002.

In 2003, she was inducted into the Rhode Island Heritage Hall of Fame, along with her second husband, Thomas Davis.

== See also ==
- List of suffragists and suffragettes
- Married Women's Property Acts in the United States
- Timeline of women's suffrage
- Women's suffrage organizations
