= Eliza Wright Osborne =

American suffragist and feminist (1829-1911)

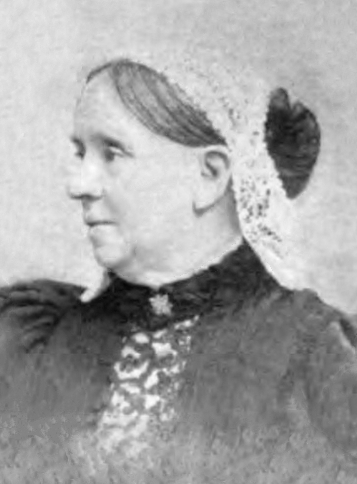
- Osborne in 1902
- Born: Eliza Wright; September 3, 1829; Aurora, Erie County, New York, U.S.
- Died: July 19, 1911 (aged 81); Auburn, New York, U.S.
- Occupations: Suffragist and women's rights activist
- Spouse: David Munson Osborne (m. 1851)
- Children: 4
- Parent(s): Martha Coffin Wright and David Wright
- Relatives: Lucretia Mott (aunt)

Eliza Osborne (née Wright; September 3, 1829 – July 19, 1911) was an American suffragist and feminist, who became vice president of the New York Woman Suffrage Association.

The niece and daughter, respectively, of prominent women's rights activists Lucretia Mott and Martha Coffin Wright, she was also a colleague of suffragists Susan B. Anthony, Elizabeth Cady Stanton and the Rev. Anna Howard Shaw, and was credited by her contemporaries with having helped to expand the women's suffrage movement across the nation and with the founding of the Women's Education and Industrial Union in Auburn, New York.

== Formative years and family ==
Born as Eliza Wright in Aurora, Erie County, New York on September 3, 1829, Eliza Wright Osborne was a daughter of David Wright and Martha Coffin Wright and the eldest sister of Tallman, Ellen, William, and Francis Wright. In 1848, her mother and her maternal aunt, Lucretia Mott, played key roles in organizing the Seneca Falls Convention, which was the first women's rights convention ever held in the United States. Wright fell under their influence and the influence of the other suffragists with whom they regularly interacted.

In 1851, Wright married David Munson Osborne, a farm machinery manufacturer. They had four children: Emily, Florence, Thomas, and Helen. Her son, Thomas Mott Osborne, became a prison reformer and a forest, fish and game commissioner; her grandson, Lithgow Osborne, became a diplomat and environmentalist.

== Inheriting Suffrage Legacy ==
Eliza Wright Osborne participated in the women's suffrage movement as the vice president of the New York State Women Suffrage Association. The founder of Auburn's Woman's Educational and Industrial Union, she also donated $200,000 to erect the building used by that organization for its programs and services for women. Along with other prominent New York suffragists such as Elizabeth Cady Stanton, Eliza Wright Osborne was one of the seventy-two women on the national roll of honor of the National League of Women.

== Death, estate resolution and memorial service ==
Eliza Wright Osborne died on July 19, 1911, in her residence, No. 99 South Street in Auburn. She died at the age of 81. Her will, which was made public on July 23, 1911, made provisions for family, friends and former associates from the suffrage movement, and also provided the following bequests:

- Auburn City Hospital: $5,000;
- Auburn Home for the Friendless: $10,000;
- Cayuga Orphan Asylum/Cayuga Asylum for Destitute Children: $5,000;
- George Junior Republic, Freeville: $20,000; and the
- Women's Educational and Industrial Union of Auburn: $25,000 plus the building that Elizabeth Wright Osborne built for the Auburn Women's Union at a cost of $200,000.

Her memorial service was held in Auburn on October 15, 1911. The Rev. Anna Howard Shaw, one of the first women to be ordained as a Methodist minister in America and a suffrage movement colleague of Osborne's, was one of the primary speakers at the service.
