= Josephine Sophia White Griffing =

American activist

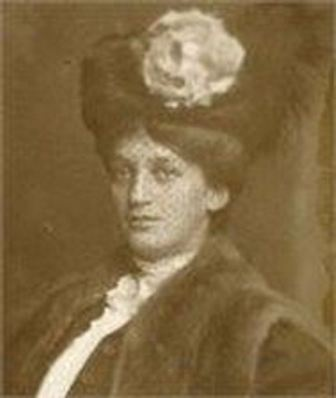
- Born: Josephine White; December 18, 1814; Hebron, Connecticut, U.S.
- Died: February 18, 1872 (aged 57); Washington, District of Columbia, U.S.
- Burial place: Burrows Hill Cemetery, Hebron, Tolland County, Connecticut, U.S.
- Spouse: Charles Stockman Spooner Griffing
- Children: 5
- Parents: Joseph White Jr. (father); Sophia Waldo (mother)
- Relatives: Samuel Lovett Waldo (uncle)

Josephine Sophia White Griffing (December 18, 1814 – February 18, 1872) was an American reformer who campaigned against slavery and for women's rights. In Litchfield, Ohio, their home was a stop on the Underground Railroad and she worked as a lecturer for the Western Anti-Slavery Society and Ohio Women's Rights Association. At the end of the American Civil War she moved to Washington, D.C., to help work with the unemployed freedmen. Much of her work was done through the Freedmen's Bureau, where she worked as an assistant to the assistant commissioner and as an agent. Griffing was also active in several women's rights organizations, including the National Woman Suffrage Association.

== Early life ==
Josephine White was born in Hebron, Connecticut, on December 18, 1814, into a prominent family. Her father, Joseph White Jr., was a representative in Connecticut's state legislature. While her mother Sophia Waldo was the sister of portrait painter Samuel Lovett Waldo, her mother died a year after her birth in 1815. After her mother's death, her father married Mary Waldo, the sister to Sophia Waldo. Despite the relative fame of her family, little is known of her childhood in Connecticut.

On September 16, 1835, at the age of twenty, Josephine married Charles Stockman Spooner Griffing in Stafford, Connecticut. By 1842, the couple moved to Litchfield, Ohio, where they had five daughters. Three of their children survived into adulthood, including Emma, Helen, and Josephine Cora.

== Abolitionist work ==
While living in Litchfield, Ohio the Griffing family became involved with some of the radical organizations that were thriving in Ohio's Western Reserve. By 1849, both Charles and Josephine were active members of the Western Anti-Slavery Society, and by 1851 they were traveling agents, preaching "no union with slaveholders." Griffing also began going on lecture tours on abolitionism throughout the West, becoming one of the most prolific anti-slavery speakers in the region. She also wrote articles for The Anti-Slavery Bugle, a newspaper published out of Salem, Ohio.

The Griffings opened up their home as a stop on the Underground Railroad. During the Civil War, Griffing acted as the western agent for the Women's Loyal National League, a feminist organization that worked to outlaw slavery in every state.

== Aiding the freedpeople ==
During the Civil War, Griffing was struck by the plight of the recently freed slaves, especially those who were fleeing to Washington, D.C. Determined to help the freedpeople establish themselves, Griffing and her three daughters moved to Washington, D.C., in 1864, while her husband remained in Ohio. Why her husband remained behind is uncertain.

Griffing became an agent for the National Freedmen's Relief Association of the District of Columbia, where she opened up two industrial schools for freedwomen in order to teach them marketable skills such as sewing. These schools were also designed to inculcate freedwomen with the values of the Northern white middle class. In Griffing's words, "the Industrial School furnishes an opportunity for instruction in social science, and domestic relations, as well as the higher forms of Industry, and a marked change is observable in personal tidiness, good manners, and in the control and government of young children - whom some of the mothers are obliged to bring with them to the Rooms." While in Washington, Griffing also used her political influence to lobby Congressmen for more direct aid for the formerly enslaved people of Washington. Through her lobbying of Radical Republican members of Congress, such as Benjamin Wade and Charles Sumner, Griffing became instrumental in establishing the Bureau of Refugees, Freedmen, and Abandoned Lands, more commonly known as the Freedmen's Bureau. In June 1865, as reward for her work in helping to create the Freedmen's Bureau, Commissioner Oliver Otis Howard appointed Griffing the assistant to the assistant commissioner for Washington, D.C.

Despite Griffing's prominence in the Freedmen's Bureau, she and the male leaders of the organization often conflicted over how best to aid the freedpeople of Washington. Griffing argued that the freedpeople required direct aid, such as food, clothes, and fuel, and that the Bureau's main goals should be to provide material aid for those living in Washington. This aid, according to Griffing, was necessary for the freedpeople to become financially stable, and once that occurred they could obtain jobs and support themselves. However, men involved in freedpeople's aid organizations disagreed with Griffing's claims. They often supported the ideals of free labor; these men encouraged self-reliance and the signing of labor contracts so that freedpeople could survive financially without assistance as quickly as possible. Griffing openly spoke out about the lack of direct aid, claiming that 20,000 freedpeople in Washington, D.C., were suffering for lack of rations and supplies and that the Bureau men would not help them. The agents of the Bureau denied her statement, despite the evidence supporting her argument. By November 1865, Commissioner Howard revoked Griffing's appointment due to these conflicts, stating that "this Bureau has not received any funds from Mrs. Griffing and does not assume responsibility of the collections she is making."

Even with this setback, Griffing continued to help better the lives of the freedpeople. She worked with her government contacts to help freedpeople find jobs in the north, and sometimes travelled with them to make sure they arrived safely. The Freedmen's Bureau worked with Griffing on this project, providing barracks in Rhode Island, offices in New York City, and fund for rent and other necessary expenses. By 1867, Griffing was working for the Freedmen's Bureau once more, this time as an agent for the Capitol Hill and Navy Yard districts. Throughout her tenure, Griffing fought for increased aid for the freedpeople, as well as continuing her efforts at finding employment for African Americans in the north. She also kept contact with her associates in the federal government and in private aid organizations in order to obtain as much aid as possible for the destitute of Washington, D.C. Griffing worked as an agent for the Freedmen's Bureau until it ran out of funding and was forced to stop providing aid in late 1869. She continued working to aid freedpeople through the National Freedmen's Aid Association of the District of Columbia until her death in 1872.

== Work for women’s rights ==
In addition to her work for the freedpeople of Washington, D.C., Griffing was also a women's rights activist. In the 1850s, Griffing became involved with women's rights organizations, making contact with women like Susan B. Anthony who would inspire her to fight for the rights of women as well as African Americans. Throughout the 1850s, Griffing joined various feminist organizations, such as the Ohio Women's Rights Association, which she became the president of in 1853. Shortly after President Abraham Lincoln gave the Emancipation Proclamation in 1863, Griffing joined the Women's Loyal National League as a lecturing agent, where she helped collect thousands of signatures for a women's antislavery petition that was eventually presented to the United States Congress by Charles Sumner. Griffing was also active in the temperance movement that was popular amongst many feminist activists during the nineteenth and early twentieth centuries.

While in Washington, D.C., Griffing maintained her dedication to women's rights and the cause of suffrage. In 1866 she helped found the American Equal Rights Association, whose purpose was to promote equality and suffrage for all people no matter their race or sex; she also served as its first vice-president. Griffing became the president of District of Columbia woman suffrage association in 1867, where she helped monitor guide suffrage activities in Washington, D.C. In 1869, along with Susan B. Anthony, Elizabeth Cady Stanton, and other prominent reformers, Griffing joined the National Woman Suffrage Association and acted as its corresponding secretary.

Josephine Griffing died in 1872 in Washington, D.C., with her cause of death listed as "consumption" (tuberculosis). She was 57 at the time, and was survived by her husband and her three daughters.

== Remembrance ==
The first volume of History of Woman Suffrage, published in 1881, states, “THESE VOLUMES ARE AFFECTIONATELY INSCRIBED TO THE Memory of Mary Wollstonecraft, Frances Wright, Lucretia Mott, Harriet Martineau, Lydia Maria Child, Margaret Fuller, Sarah and Angelina Grimké, Josephine S. Griffing, Martha C. Wright, Harriot K. Hunt, M.D., Mariana W. Johnson, Alice and Phebe Carey, Ann Preston, M.D., Lydia Mott, Eliza W. Farnham, Lydia F. Fowler, M.D., Paulina Wright Davis, Whose Earnest Lives and Fearless Words, in Demanding Political Rights for Women, have been, in the Preparation of these Pages, a Constant Inspiration TO The Editors”.

== See also ==
- List of suffragists and suffragettes
