= Eliza Farnham =

American novelist (1815–1864)

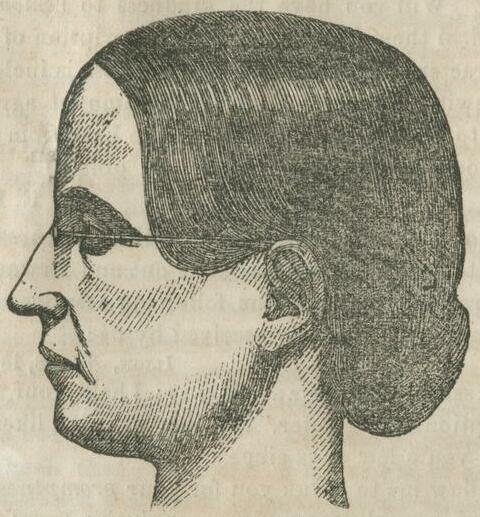
- Eliza Farnham
- Born: Eliza Woodson Burhans; November 17, 1815; Rensselaerville, New York
- Died: December 15, 1864 (aged 49); New York City, New York
- Occupations: Novelist; feminist; abolitionist; activist for prison reform
- Writing career
- Genre: non-fiction
- Notable works: Woman and Her Era (1864)

Eliza Wood Burns Farnham (November 17, 1815 – December 15, 1864) was a 19th-century American novelist, feminist, abolitionist, and activist for prison reform.

== Biography ==
She was born in Rensselaerville, New York. She moved to Illinois in 1835, and there married Thomas J. Farnham in 1836, but returned to New York in 1841. In 1843 she wrote a series of articles for Brother Jonathan refuting John Neal's call for women's suffrage in that same newspaper, though Elizabeth Cady Stanton and Susan B. Anthony wrote in 1887 that "Mrs. Farnham lived long enough to retrace her ground and accept the highest truth." In 1844, through the influence of Horace Greeley and other reformers, she was appointed matron of the women's ward at Sing Sing Prison. She strongly believed in the use of phrenology to treat prisoners. Farnham was influential in changing the types of reading materials available to women prisoners. The purpose of her choices was not entertainment but improving behavior. She also advocated using music and kindness in the rehabilitation of female prisoners. Farnham retained the office of matron until 1848 when, amid controversy over her choices and beliefs, she resigned in 1848. She then moved to Boston, and was for several months connected with the management of the Institution for the Blind.

In 1849 she travelled to California with her two sons, having inherited property there, and remained there until 1856, when she returned to New York. For the two years following, she devoted herself to the study of medicine, and in 1859 organized a society to assist destitute women in finding homes in the west, taking charge in person of several companies of this class of emigrants. She subsequently returned to California.

She died from consumption in New York City at the age of 49. She was an atheist.

== Publications ==
- Life in the Prairie Land, 1846 - An account of life on the Illinois prairie near Pekin between 1836 and 1840.
- California, In-doors and Out, 1856 - A chronicle of her experiences and observations on California.
- My Early Days, 1859 - An autobiographical novel.
- Woman and Her Era, 1864 - "Organic, religious, esthetic, and historical" arguments for woman's inherent superiority.
- The Ideal Attained: being the story of two steadfast souls, and how they won their happiness and lost it not, 1865

== Remembrance ==
The first volume of History of Woman Suffrage, published in 1881, states, "THESE VOLUMES ARE AFFECTIONATELY INSCRIBED TO THE Memory of Mary Wollstonecraft, Frances Wright, Lucretia Mott, Harriet Martineau, Lydia Maria Child, Margaret Fuller, Sarah and Angelina Grimké, Josephine S. Griffing, Martha C. Wright, Harriot K. Hunt, M.D., Mariana W. Johnson, Alice and Phebe Carey, Ann Preston, M.D., Lydia Mott, Eliza W. Farnham, Lydia F. Fowler, M.D., Paulina Wright Davis, Whose Earnest Lives and Fearless Words, in Demanding Political Rights for Women, have been, in the Preparation of these Pages, a Constant Inspiration TO The Editors".

== See also ==
- Georgiana Bruce Kirby
