= Ann Preston =

American physician and educator (1813–1872)

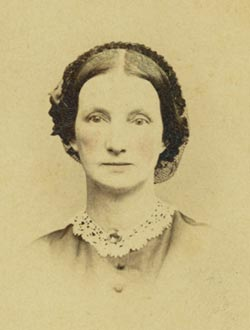
- Ann Preston, c. 1867
- Born: December 1, 1813; West Grove, Pennsylvania, United States
- Died: April 18, 1872 (aged 58)
- Education: Woman's Medical College of Pennsylvania; Doctor of Medicine 1851
- Occupations: Physician, activist, educator
- Known for: First female dean of an American medical college

Ann Preston (December 1, 1813 – April 18, 1872) was an American physician, activist, and educator. As head of the Woman's Medical College of Pennsylvania, she was the first female dean of a medical school in the United States of America.

== Early life and education ==
=== Early life ===
Preston was born in 1813 in West Grove, Pennsylvania to prosperous farmer and prominent Quaker Amos Preston and his wife Margaret Smith Preston. One of eight siblings, she was educated in a local Quaker school and later briefly attended a Quaker boarding school in nearby Chester, Pennsylvania. The Chester County Quaker community was ardently abolitionist and pro-temperance, and the Preston family farm, Prestonville, was known as safe harbor for escaped slaves as part of the Underground Railroad. As the eldest daughter, Ann took care of her family during her mother’s frequent illnesses, interrupting her formal education. She began to attend lectures at the local lyceum, belonged to the local literary society, became a member of the Clarkson Anti-Slavery Society, and was active in the temperance and women’s rights movements.

Once her younger siblings were old enough, Preston began to work locally as a schoolteacher. In 1849, she published a book of nursery rhymes titled Cousin Ann's Stories.

=== Medical education ===
By the 1840s, Preston became interested in educating women about their bodies and taught all-female classes on hygiene and physiology. She was privately educated in medicine as an apprentice to Dr. Nathaniel Moseley from 1847 to 1849. Unable to attend other medical schools because of their policies against admitting women, Preston entered the Quaker-founded Female Medical College of Pennsylvania (later changed to Woman's Medical College of Pennsylvania in 1867) at the age of 38 as a student in its inaugural class of 1850. While studying at the Female Medical College In 1851, Preston wrote to her friend and fellow Quaker activist Hannah Darlington:

The joy of exploring a new field of knowledge, the rest from accustomed pursuits and cares, the stimulus of competition, the novelty of a new kind of life, are all mine, and all for the time possess a charm. And then, I am restful in spirit and well satisfied that I came.

Preston graduated in 1851, one of eight women in her class.

== Career ==
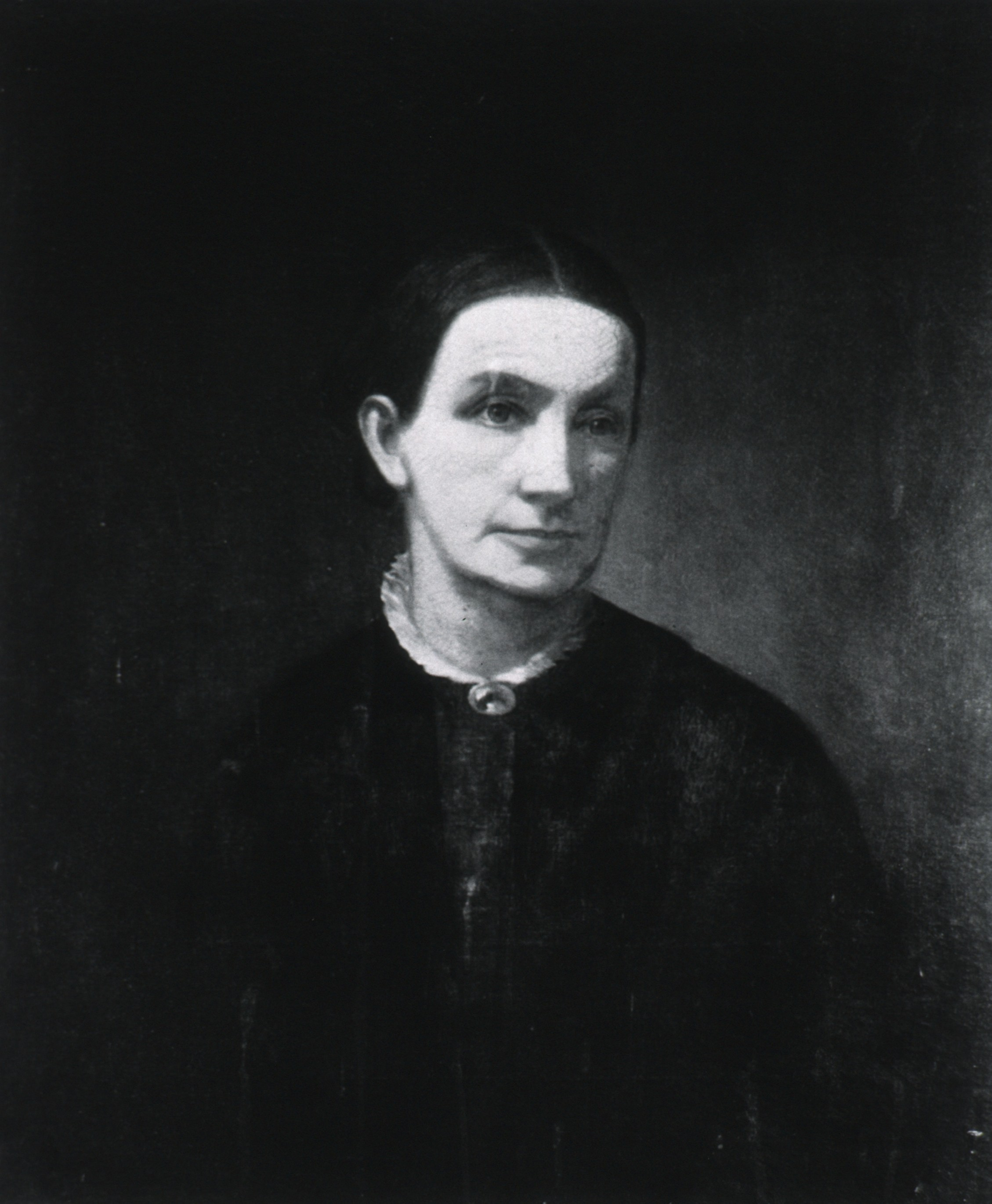
Ann Preston

Preston returned to the Woman's Medical College of Pennsylvania the year following her graduation for postgraduate work, and became a professor of physiology and hygiene in 1853. In 1862, she led the effort to found the Woman’s Hospital of Philadelphia in order to provide clinical training to the college’s students. During the American Civil War, the college closed for the 1861–62 sessions due to a lack of funding. At this time, Preston fell ill from rheumatic fever, stress, and exhaustion, and was admitted to the Pennsylvania Hospital for the Insane for three months to recuperate under the care of Dr. Thomas S. Kirkbride, a Quaker physician who advocated for the "humane treatment" of the mentally ill.

When the Female Medical College resumed operations in October 1862, it re-opened in rooms rented from the Women's Hospital of Philadelphia. In 1864, a rift emerged among the faculty when dean Edwin Fussell tried to prevent student Mary Putnam Jacobi from graduating with a medical degree, feeling that she did not meet the required qualifications. Other faculty, including Dr. Preston, supported Jacobi and disagreed with Fussell's decision. Following the incident, Fussell, an early faculty member and nephew of college founder Bartholomew Fussell, resigned and Preston became dean of the college in 1866 and held the position until 1872. She was the first woman to become the dean of a medical school, a position that allowed her to champion the right of women to become physicians.

As dean, Preston campaigned for her female students to be admitted to clinical lectures at the Blockley Philadelphia Hospital, and the Pennsylvania Hospital, despite the open hostility of some male medical students and faculty.

Historian Steve Peitzman called Preston an "Institution builder," guiding the Woman's Medical College through its post- Civil War rebuilding and growth. In Peitzman's words, she was a "fighting Quaker, her weapons being moral suasion, active example, and...the forceful written word." In addition to the hospital she founded before becoming dean, she opened a school of nursing, and continued to push for educational opportunities for the female students of Woman's Medical College, including more and better clinical experience. In 1867, the Philadelphia County Medical Society objected to the practice of medicine by women. Ann Preston's response in part was "...we must protest...against the injustice which places difficulties in our way, not because we are ignorant or incompetent or unmindful in the code of medical or Christian ethics, but because we are women."

In 1868, Preston negotiated with Philadelphia's Blockley Hospital to allow students from the Woman's Medical College of Pennsylvania to attend the general clinics there. In 1869, she made a similar arrangement with the Pennsylvania Hospital, where in November 1869, a group of about thirty students from the Woman's Medical College were verbally and physically harassed by male medical students. Anna Broomall, an 1871 graduate of the Woman's Medical College and future faculty member, recalled "the [male] students rushed in pell-mell, stood up in the seats, hooted, called us names and threw spitballs, trying in vain to dislodge us." The incident sparked very public debates in the local and national press about the propriety of the presence of female medical students at clinical demonstrations but the result was the inevitability and acceptance of co-ed clinics.

In addition to educating medical students and advocating for woman physicians, Dr. Preston also practiced medicine, attending at Woman's Hospital and maintaining her own private practice.

== Private life and death ==
Preston never married, but reportedly led a rich and active social and professional life, including establishing a household "where dear friends live with me in harmonious relations, and do much to make this an orderly home circle." She continued to write and work for social reform until she suffered from an attack of acute articular rheumatism in 1871, which weakened her health. She suffered a relapse the following year and died on April 18, 1872.

== Bibliography ==
- Cousin Ann's Stories for Children (1849; re-issued 2011)
- She also published various essays on the medical education of women.

== Files of Ann Preston ==
- Preston Family Bible (includes family register in center), 1838
- Poem, "The Child's Playhouse", 1842
- Poem, "To a Departed Sister", 1843
- Cousin Ann's Stories for Children (Philadelphia, J.M. McKim; 36 pages), 1849
- System of Human Anatomy, general and special, by Wilson Erasmus, M.D. (Philadelphia), 1850. Owned, signed and annotated.
- Address on the Occasion of the Centennial Celebration of the Founding of the Pennsylvania Hospital, by George B. Wood, M.D., 1851. Owned, signed and annotated.
- Addresses and lectures (including an introductory lecture, 2 valedictory addresses, and "Women as Physicians", 1855, 1858, 1867, 1870.
- Letter to the Board of Managers of the Pennsylvania Hospital, 1856.
- Letters to Sarah Coates, 1831 March 21, undated.
- Poem, "It's Good to Live. A Thanksgiving Hymn", undated.
- Poem, "Remember me when far away...", undated.
- Letters to Sarah Coates, 1831, 1846, undated.
- Letters to unknown recipients, 1831, 1854.
- Letters to Hannah M. Darlington, 1833-1851, undated.
- Letters to Lavinia M. Passmore, 1843, 1860, 1868.
- Letters from William Darlington, 1860.
- "Address in Memory of Ann Preston, M.D.," by Elizabeth E. Judson, M.D., 1873 March 11.
- Letter to Dr. Alsop, undated.
- Information regarding the collected copies and locations of originals, 1968-1969.

== Quotes ==
In Ann Preston's 1858 valedictory address, she speculated that:
"No lordly Turk, smoking on his ottoman, could better depict the depravation which public manners would suffer, if Turkish women, should openly walk, side by side with fathers, husbands, and brothers, to the solemn Mosque, than some among us have portrayed the perversion our society must undergo if woman shares with man the office of Physician."

— "A Mother", letter to the Herald Tribune, March 5, 1870. WMC, College Scrapbooks, #3, 1868, 1869, January 1870 – August 1871, 86.

Ann Preston (1813-1872):
"Wherever it is proper to introduce women as patients, there also it is in accordance with the instinct of truest womanhood for women to appear as physicians and students."

— Quoted in The Liberated Woman's Appointment Calendar, Lynn Sherr and Jurate Kazickas, eds. 1975

== Remembrance ==
"Address in Memory of Ann Preston, M.D.," by Elizabeth E. Judson, M.D., 1873 March 11.

The first volume of History of Woman Suffrage, published in 1881, states, “THESE VOLUMES ARE AFFECTIONATELY INSCRIBED TO THE Memory of Mary Wollstonecraft, Frances Wright, Lucretia Mott, Harriet Martineau, Lydia Maria Child, Margaret Fuller, Sarah and Angelina Grimké, Josephine S. Griffing, Martha C. Wright, Harriot K. Hunt, M.D., Mariana W. Johnson, Alice and Phebe Carey, Ann Preston, M.D., Lydia Mott, Eliza W. Farnham, Lydia F. Fowler, M.D., Paulina Wright Davis, Whose Earnest Lives and Fearless Words, in Demanding Political Rights for Women, have been, in the Preparation of these Pages, a Constant Inspiration TO The Editors”.
