= Clovernook =

Historic house in Ohio, United States

- U.S. National Register of Historic Places
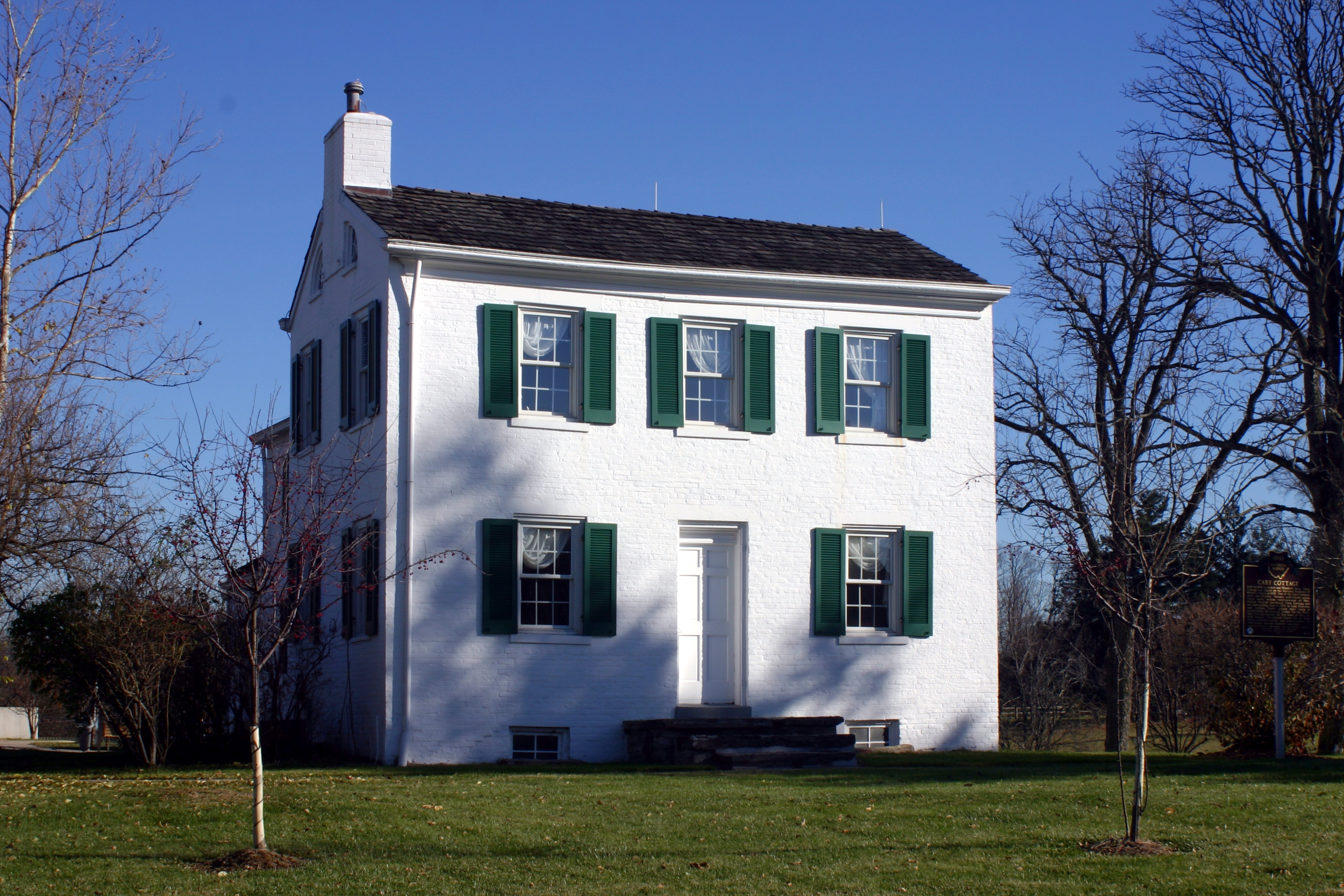
- Cary Cottage, childhood home of poets Alice and Phoebe Cary

- Location within Ohio Location within the United States
- Location: 7000 Hamilton Ave., North College Hill, Ohio
- Coordinates: 39°13′12″N 84°32′56″W
- Built: 1832
- NRHP reference No.: 73001454
- Added to NRHP: June 18, 1973

Clovernook Farm was the family home of poets Alice and Phoebe Cary in what is now North College Hill, Ohio. The farm was once part of a 1 million acre (4,000 km^{2}) tract of Springfield Township that was purchased in 1787 by John Cleves Symmes, a New Jersey delegate to the Continental Congress and a pioneer in the Northwest Territory. The first member of the Cary family in southwestern Ohio was Revolutionary War veteran Christopher Cary, who emigrated to Ohio in 1803 to claim the land grant he was awarded by the Federal government for his military service. His son Robert worked on the family farm before leaving home to fight in the War of 1812.

In 1813–14, Christopher's brother William Cary built a log cabin in the “wilderness” ten miles (16 km) north of Cincinnati and moved his family to the area, which was then known as Mill Creek Township. Soon after, William purchased an additional 75 acres (300,000 m^{2}) north of North Bend Road adjacent to his original tract and sold part of this land to his brother's son Robert. who called the 27 acres (110,000 m^{2}) Clovernook Farm.

After returning home from the war, Robert erected a small three-room frame house for his family in 1814; this home was the birthplace of Alice and Phoebe. Robert also laid out the first community in the area, on the east side of Hamilton Avenue (now also known as U.S. Route 127), and called it Clovernook as well.

The white brick house now known as Cary Cottage, which stands on the campus of the Clovernook Center for the Blind and Visually Impaired at 7000 Hamilton Avenue, was built in 1832. It was a more substantial structure with a frame porch. As their family grew, Robert and his wife Elizabeth divided their nine children among the two homes.

Late in life, Alice Cary told a friend about her family's home in Ohio: "In the autumn of 1832, by persevering industry and frugal living, the farm was at last paid for, and a new and more commodius dwelling erected for the reception of the family. This new dwelling, which is still standing, is no more than the plainest of farm-houses, yet it represents a degree of comfort only attained after a long struggle."

The house contains original wooden floors, a narrow winding staircase, a kitchen fireplace and bake oven, and a working outdoor well. The bricks used in its construction were fired on the property. Restoration and furnishing of the house—begun after it was added to the National Register of Historic Places—were aided by a number of descriptive passages in Alice and Phoebe's poems.

In 1903, Cary Cottage became the first home for blind women in Ohio through the work of the Trader sisters, Florence and Georgia (who was blind). The Cary house and the land surrounding it were purchased by William A. Procter, grandson of the Procter & Gamble co-founder, in order to give them in trust to the Traders. As many as thirteen blind and visually impaired women (and one man) lived in the house as the Trader sisters used the land and the home to provide them employment as a source of dignity and direction. This mission became the work of the Clovernook Center for the Blind and Visually Impaired, and it now offers instruction, employment, community living and low vision services for men and women. The center runs three manufacturing departments and is one of the country's largest volume producers of Braille publications.
