= Lydia Folger Fowler =

American-born British physician (1823–1879)

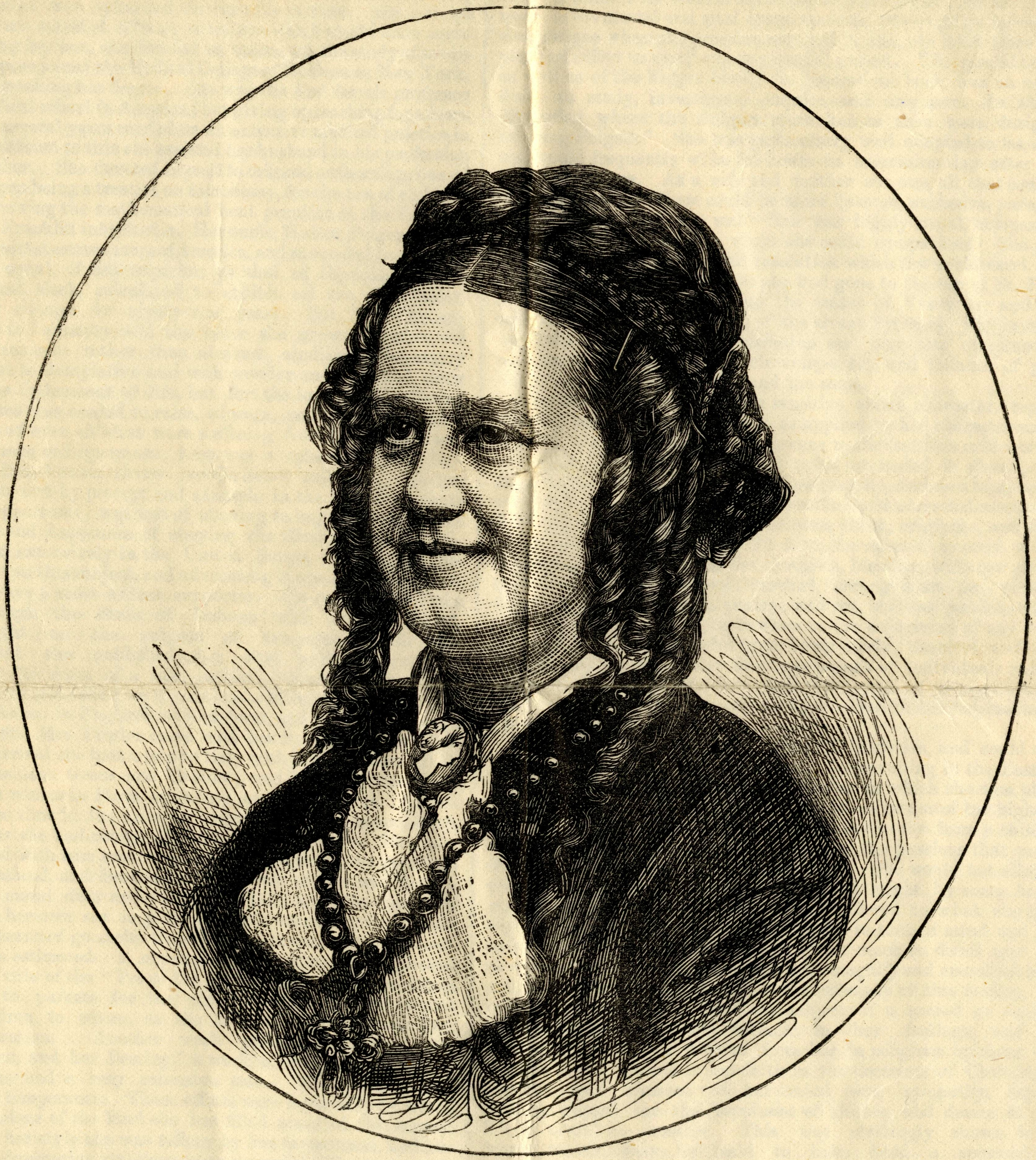
- Born: Lydia Folger; May 5, 1823; Nantucket, Massachusetts, United States
- Died: January 26, 1879 (aged 55); London, England
- Education: Wheaton College (Massachusetts) (B.A.); Central Medical College, New York (M.D.)
- Known for: Second female physician in the United States
- Scientific career
- Fields: Eclectic Medicine

Lydia Folger Fowler (May 5, 1823 – January 26, 1879) was a pioneering American medical doctor, professor of medicine, and activist. She was the second American woman to earn a medical degree (after Elizabeth Blackwell) and one of the first American women in medicine and a prominent woman in science. She married a phrenologist and her daughter, Jessie Allen Fowler, continued their ideas.

== Family life ==
Lydia Folger was born in Nantucket, Massachusetts, in 1823, to Gideon and Eunice Macy Folger, a historic Massachusetts family descended from Peter Foulger. Lydia was the great-great-great-great granddaughter of Peter Foulger and Mary Morrill Foulger. Through them she was the first cousin four times removed of Benjamin Franklin. Other notable family members included her extended cousins Lucretia Coffin Mott and Maria Mitchell and her paternal aunt Phebe Folger Coleman. Lydia was also a member of the Starbuck whaling family of Nantucket through her paternal grandmother Elizabeth Starbuck Folger. Her mother was notably a member of the Macy family of Nantucket whose descendants would later form Macy's department stores.

Folger married Lorenzo Niles Fowler, a phrenologist, on September 19, 1844. Lydia Folger Fowler also gave herself the nickname of "Mrs. L. N. Fowler" to incorporate the initials of her husband into her name. She met Lorenzo at the house of her paternal uncle, Walter Folger, Jr., an "eccentric and famous astronomer-navigator in Nantucket". Lorenzo and his brother, Orson Squire Fowler, were well-known phrenologists; the New York Times noted in his obituary that "Prof. Fowler examined the heads of many distinguished men, among them Charles Dickens, Edgar Allan Poe, William Cullen Bryant, Baron Rothschild, Li Hung Chang, and Sir Henry Irving."

Lydia and Lorenzo Fowler had three daughters: Amelia Mary Fowler, Loretta Fowler Piercy and Jessie Allen Fowler, who also became a phrenologist. Lydia Fowler was the honorary secretary of the British Women's Temperance Association, and Jessie succeeded her mother in that position. In 1896, Jessie accompanied her father when he returned to America, and she became the editor of the Fowler's Phrenological Journal. Jessie inherited the company of Fowler and Wells after her father and aunt died in 1896 and 1901. She continued to write and died in 1932.

== Education ==
Folger attended the Wheaton Female Seminary in Massachusetts when she was 16 years old and began teaching there in 1842 at the age of 20. Lydia Folger and Lorenzo Fowler would attend conferences and lecture tours together. Lydia Folger would generally address female audiences. This time also marked the beginning of her writing career, as she published her first two books in 1847: Familiar Lessons on Physiology and Familiar Lessons on Phrenology. Lydia Folger Fowler wrote her two-volume work as a way to teach other women how to teach phrenology to children. Lydia gave many presentations where she would direct teachers and parents on how to teach their children to know themselves, as she believed children could work towards self-improvement with guidance. After establishing a lecturing and writing career, she began medical school and earned an M.D. from Central Medical College in Syracuse, New York in 1850, one of eight women entering the first coed medical school in the country. Fellow students included Myra King Merrick and Sarah Adamson Dolley. At the time, the eclectic medical school was the only school to offer admission to women. Eclectic medicine became popular with those seeking to avoid the harsher methods of then-current professional medicine, such as bloodletting.

She became an appointed professor of obstetrics and diseases of women and children at Central Medical College. Central Medical College then dissolved in 1852. Lydia Folger Fowler graduated as only the second woman in America to earn a medical degree, following Elizabeth Blackwell in 1849. Fowler was, in fact, the first American-born woman to earn a medical degree, and also the first woman to appear before a male medical society.

== Career and professional involvement ==
She then went on to practice medicine in New York from 1852 to 1860, and later joined the faculty of Rochester Eclectic Medical College, becoming the first woman professor in a professional American medical school. During her time practicing, she conducted many gynecological exams and held her own surgery practice geared towards homeopathic practices. In 1862, Fowler taught midwifery at the New York Hygeio-Therapeutic College. Lydia practiced medicine with the outlook that science could improve female roles as children's caretakers. She used the knowledge gained through her medical education to help others overcome the obstacles women faced when working in the medical field.

Folger was active in women's rights organizations, and participated in the Seneca Falls Convention and presided over the Women's Grand Temperance Demonstration in Metropolitan Hall. Elizabeth Cady Stanton later dedicated The History of Woman Suffrage (1881) to Folger. Fowler also frequently lectured to audiences, primarily women, on matters of hygiene and health. The New York Tribune in 1855 described one of Fowler's lectures, to a P.T. Barnum-sponsored program on motherhood:

She was dressed in a very broadly striped silk, which was anything but a bloomer. Her hair was done up in a French twist with curls in front. Her face is pleasant, she has sunny blue eyes and a sweet mouth. She waved an elegantly embroidered handkerchief as she read her lecture. Quite a number of the little exhibited [babies] were present and contributed their full share to the festivities, at times almost drowning her voice, which is scarcely strong enough for a lecturer.

The Fowlers moved to London in 1863, and Fowler became active in the British Women's Temperance Association, as well as continuing her work practicing medicine and teaching women about health, education, and parenting. Fowler became ill in late 1878 and died on January 26, 1879. Fowler is buried on the eastern side of Highgate Cemetery in London (Plot 23071).

== Publications ==
=== Young adult audience ===
- Familiar Lessons on Physiology (1847, Fowler and Wells)
- Familiar Lessons on Phrenology (1847, Fowler and Wells)
- Familiar Lessons on Astronomy (1848)

=== Treatises and lectures on health ===
- The Pet of the Household and How to Save It: Comprised of Twelve Lectures on Physiology (1865) (a childrearing manual comprising a dozen of Fowler's lectures on childcare)
- Woman, Her Destiny and Maternal Relations; Or, Hints to the Single and Married (1864) (a feminist treatise)
- How to talk – the Tongue and the Language of Nature (1864)
- How to Preserve the Skin and Increase Personal Beauty (1864)
- How, When, and Where to Sleep (186?)
- The Brain and Nervous System: How to Secure their Healthy Action (186?)
- The Eye and Ear, and How to Preserve Them (186?)
- How to Secure a Healthy Spine and Vigorous Muscles (1864).

=== Fiction and poetry ===
- Nora: The Lost and Redeemed (1863 temperance novel)
- Heart-Melodies (1870 book of poetry)

== Remembrance ==
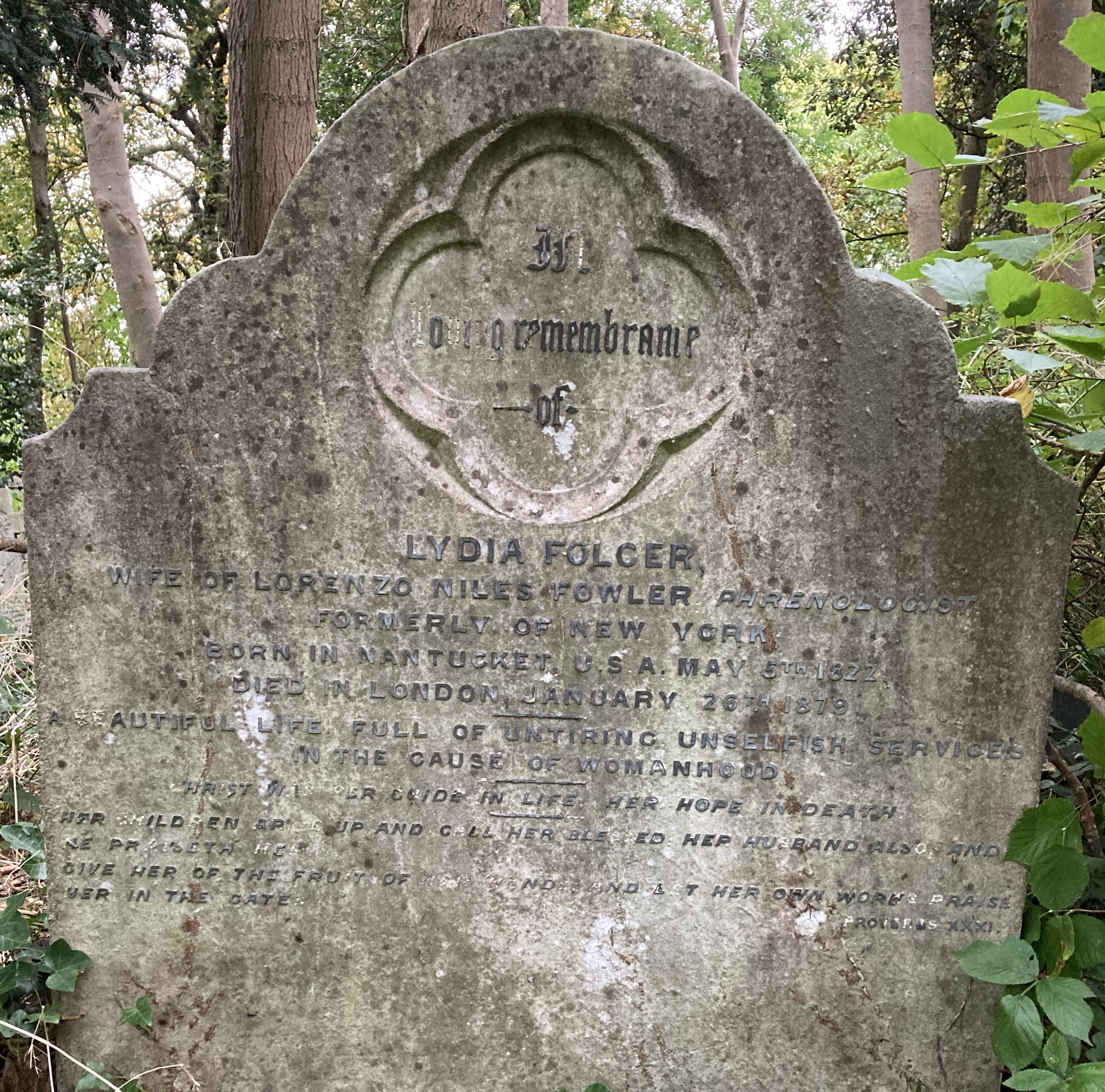
Grave of Lydia Fowler in Highgate Cemetery

Fowler is buried on the eastern side of Highgate Cemetery in London (Plot 23071).

The first volume of History of Woman Suffrage, published in 1881, states, “THESE VOLUMES ARE AFFECTIONATELY INSCRIBED TO THE Memory of Mary Wollstonecraft, Frances Wright, Lucretia Mott, Harriet Martineau, Lydia Maria Child, Margaret Fuller, Sarah and Angelina Grimké, Josephine S. Griffing, Martha C. Wright, Harriot K. Hunt, M.D., Mariana W. Johnson, Alice and Phebe Carey, Ann Preston, M.D., Lydia Mott, Eliza W. Farnham, Lydia F. Fowler, M.D., Paulina Wright Davis, Whose Earnest Lives and Fearless Words, in Demanding Political Rights for Women, have been, in the Preparation of these Pages, a Constant Inspiration TO The Editors”.
