= Martha Coffin Wright =

American feminist and abolitionist (1806–1875)

- Born: Martha Coffin; December 25, 1806; Boston, Massachusetts, U.S.
- Died: January 4, 1875 (aged 68)
- Burial place: Fort Hill Cemetery, Auburn, New York, US
- Occupation: American activist
- Spouses: Peter Pelham (m. 1824-1826; his death); 1 child; David Wright (m. 1829); 5 children
- Relatives: Lucretia Coffin Mott (sister); William Lloyd Garrison, Jr. (son-in-law) Mayhew Folger (maternal uncle) Levi Coffin (cousin)

Martha Coffin Wright (December 25, 1806 – January 4, 1875) was an American feminist, abolitionist, and signatory of the Declaration of Sentiments who was a close friend and supporter of Harriet Tubman.

== Early life ==
Martha Coffin was born in Boston, Massachusetts on Christmas Day 1806, the youngest child of Anna Folger and Thomas Coffin, a merchant and former Nantucket ship captain; she was the youngest of eight children. Some of her well-known siblings were Sarah, Lucretia, Eliza, Mary, and Thomas. All of her siblings were born in Nantucket. When she was two years old, the family moved to Philadelphia, where Wright was educated at Quaker schools. Her father died in 1815, at the age of 48, of typhus. Wright was influenced by her elder sisters and her mother. Wright's eldest sister Anna was a huge influence on her; she was the one who sent Wright to the Westtown School in 1821. This was the same school that three of her siblings attended 10 years earlier.

Wright was a cousin of Reverend Phebe Ann Coffin Hanaford; her ancestors included Thomas Mayhew, Admiral Sir Isaac Coffin and General John Coffin, while her extended family included Abby Hopper Gibbons, William Pelham, John Pelham, Congressman William Morris Davis and Edward Morris Davis.

After spending 15 years in Philadelphia, Wright moved to Aurora, New York, in the Finger Lakes country, in November 1827.

== Career ==
Wright's older sister, Lucretia Coffin Mott, was a prominent Quaker preacher. Wright and Mott attended the founding meeting of the American Anti-Slavery Society in Philadelphia in 1833.

=== Seneca Falls Convention ===
In July 1848, Mott visited Wright's home in Auburn, New York. During that visit, Wright and Lucretia met with Elizabeth Cady Stanton at Jane Hunt's house and decided to hold a convention in nearby Seneca Falls, New York, to discuss the need for greater rights for women.

The importance of the Seneca Falls Convention, the first women's rights convention, was recognized by Congress in 1980 with the creation of the Women's Rights National Historical Park at the site, administered by the National Park Service. The Park's Visitor Center today features a group of life-size bronze statues to honor the women and men who, in 1848, initiated the organized movement for women's rights and woman suffrage. Her statue shows her, as she was then, visibly pregnant. In 2005, the park featured a display about the relationship between Lucretia and Wright. In 2008, the park featured a display focused on Wright.

=== Women's rights and abolitionism ===
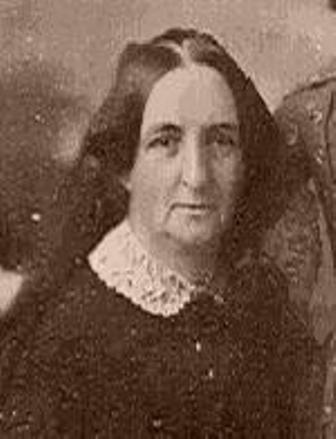

After the Seneca Falls Convention Wright Wright participated in a number of state conventions and the annual National Women's Rights Conventions in various capacities, often serving as President. She was active in the abolition movement. The arguments for women's rights had much in common with the arguments for abolition.

In September 1852, Wright attended a convention in Syracuse, New York where she gave her first speech on women's rights. This very convention was where she was first introduced to Susan B. Anthony. Wright attended many conventions and lectures all the way until 1862, when the Civil War occurred. She felt it would be best to focus on the war. She still continued her fight for the American Anti-Slavery Society, co-founding the American Equal Rights Association in 1866, merging the issues of women’s suffrage and black suffrage; she also co-founded the National Woman Suffrage Association in 1869. In 1874 she became president of the National Woman Suffrage Association.

=== Underground Railroad ===
Wright's home in Auburn, New York, was part of the Underground Railroad where she harbored fugitive slaves. She became a close friend and supporter of Harriet Tubman. Wright and her husband David Wright were influential in the movement to abolish slavery, and they shared this common interest with their close friends in Auburn, New York, the Seward family. William Henry Seward at the time was the elected governor of New York State. Seward's wife, Frances, and his sister, Lazette Worden, became interested in the works of the Women's Right movement, but never actively were involved.

=== Home in Auburn, New York ===
In 1839, the Wright family moved to 192 Genesee Street, Auburn, New York. The house was very large and close to the courthouse. This was key for her husband David's career as a lawyer. The house would be a key part in housing slaves and important figures during the women's movement. Examples of such slaves and important figures were Frederick Douglass, William Lloyd Garrison, Elizabeth Cady Stanton, and Susan B. Anthony.

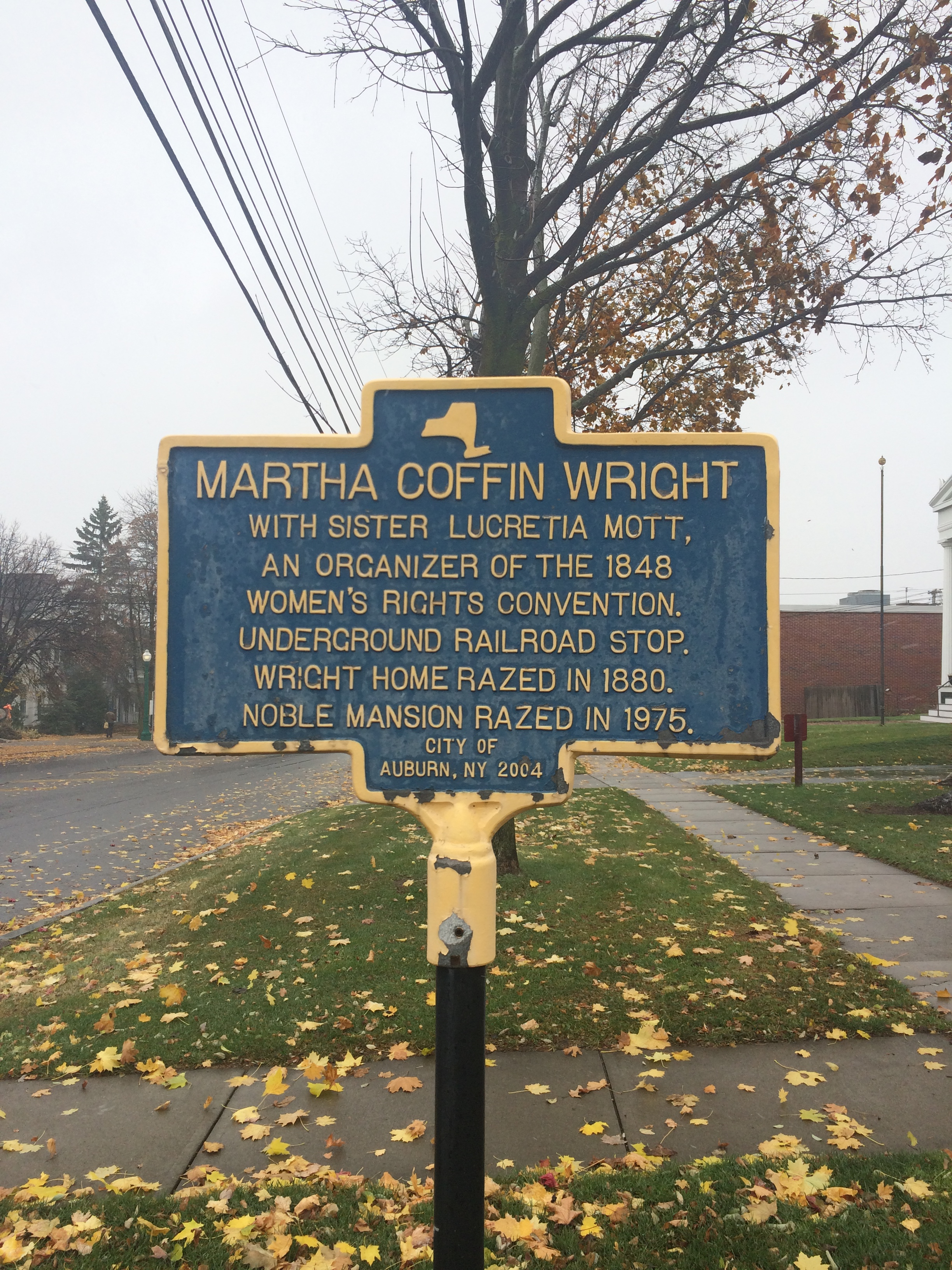
Marker recognizing Wright

== Personal life ==
In 1824, Wright married Captain Peter Pelham (1785-1826) of Kentucky and moved with him to a frontier fort at Tampa Bay, Florida; Peter died in July 1826, leaving Wright a nineteen-year-old widow with an infant daughter. She moved to upstate New York to teach painting and writing at a Quaker school for girls. After the death of her husband in 1826 she met a man by the name of Julius Catlin and continued to see him. In 1828, they both expressed their wish to become engaged and married. Yet, nothing ever came of the relationship because Julius's father did not approve of Wright and he met an early death in 1828. This was not the end of Wright's love life. In 1829, she met David Wright, a lawyer and fellow Quaker. They married on November 18, 1829. Wright had six children, Marianna (whom she had with her first husband), Tallman, Eliza, Ellen, William, and Francis.

Wright's daughter Ellen Wright (1840–1931) was an advocate of women's rights, especially women's suffrage. In 1864, Ellen Wright married William Lloyd Garrison Jr. (1838–1909), a prominent advocate of Henry George's single tax movement, free trade, woman's suffrage, and of the repeal of the Chinese Exclusion Act. William was the son of abolitionist William Lloyd Garrison. The Garrisons' daughter, Eleanor Garrison (1880–1974), worked for the National American Woman Suffrage Association.

=== Death ===
Martha Coffin Wright died on January 4, 1875. She is buried in Fort Hill Cemetery in Auburn, New York.

=== Recognition ===
The first volume of History of Woman Suffrage, published in 1881, states, “THESE VOLUMES ARE AFFECTIONATELY INSCRIBED TO THE Memory of Mary Wollstonecraft, Frances Wright, Lucretia Mott, Harriet Martineau, Lydia Maria Child, Margaret Fuller, Sarah and Angelina Grimké, Josephine S. Griffing, Martha C. Wright, Harriot K. Hunt, M.D., Mariana W. Johnson, Alice and Phebe Carey, Ann Preston, M.D., Lydia Mott, Eliza W. Farnham, Lydia F. Fowler, M.D., Paulina Wright Davis, Whose Earnest Lives and Fearless Words, in Demanding Political Rights for Women, have been, in the Preparation of these Pages, a Constant Inspiration TO The Editors”.

In 2007, Wright was inducted into the National Women's Hall of Fame.

On October 9, 2007, House resolution 588 entitled "Recognizing Martha Coffin Wright on the 200th anniversary of her birth and her induction into the National Women's Hall of Fame" passed in the U.S. House of Representatives.

== Bibliography ==
- National Historic Park of New York website
- Penney, Sherry H. and Livingstone, James D. A Very Dangerous Woman: Martha Wright and Women's Rights. University of Massachusetts Press, 2004. ISBN 1-55849-446-4.
- Penney, S. H., & Livingston, J. D. (n.d.). Expectant at Senecca Falls. Retrieved November 28, 2016.
