= Phoebe Cary =

American writer

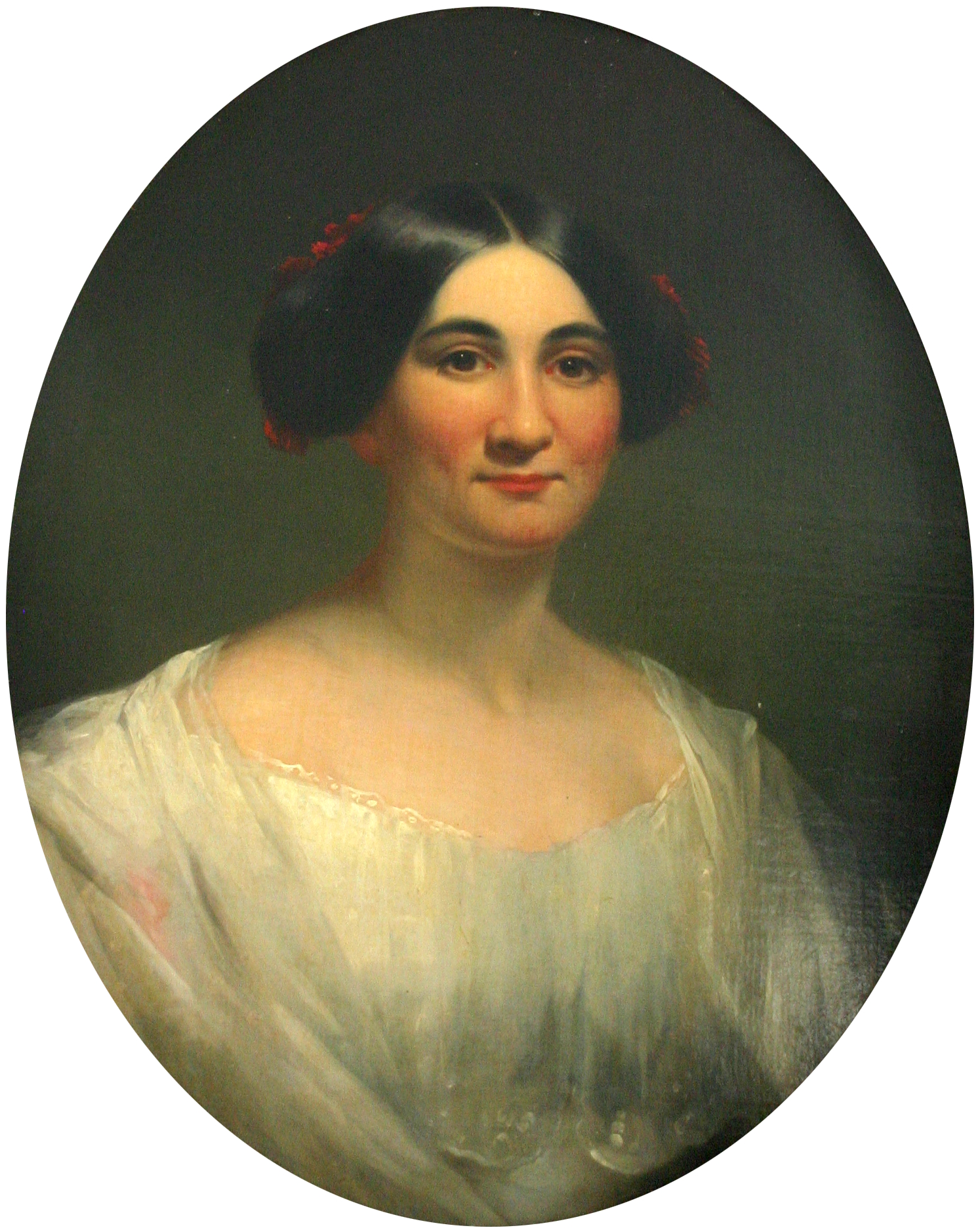
- 1850 portrait of Phoebe Cary in New York City which hangs in her childhood home in North College Hill, Ohio
- Born: September 4, 1824 North College Hill, Ohio, U.S.
- Died: July 31, 1871 (aged 46) Newport, Rhode Island, U.S.
- Resting place: Green-Wood Cemetery
- Genre: Prose

Phoebe Cary (September 4, 1824 – July 31, 1871) was an American poet, and the younger sister of poet Alice Cary (1820–1871). The sisters co-published poems in 1849, and then each went on to publish volumes of their own. After their deaths in 1871, joint anthologies of the sisters' unpublished poems were also compiled.

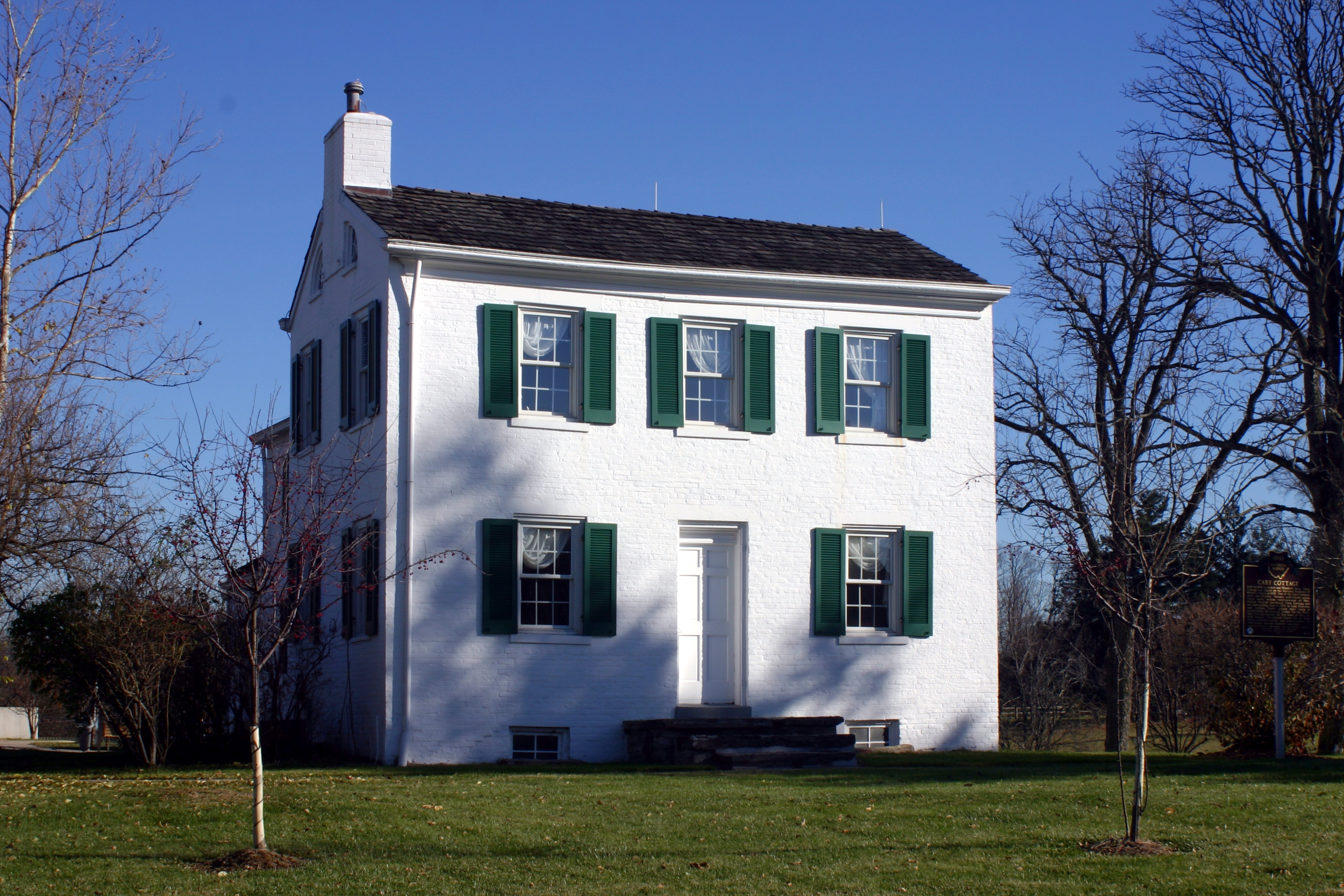
Cary Cottage, childhood home of Alice and Phoebe Cary near Cincinnati, Ohio

Phoebe Cary was born on September 4, 1824, in Mount Healthy, Ohio, near Cincinnati, and she and her sister Alice were raised on the Clovernook farm in what is now North College Hill, Ohio. While they were raised in a Universalist household and held political and religious views that were liberal and reformist, they often attended Methodist, Presbyterian, and Congregationalist services and were friendly with ministers of all these denominations and others.

While they occasionally attended school, the sisters were often needed to work at home and so were largely self-educated. The sisters' mother died in 1835 and two years afterwards their father married again. Their stepmother was wholly unsympathetic regarding their literary aspirations. For their part, while they were ready to and willing to aid to the full extent of their strength in household labour; the sisters persisted in a determination to study and write when the day's work was done. Sometimes they were refused the use of candles to the extent of their wishes and the device of a saucer of lard with a bit of rag for a wick was their only light after the rest of the family had retired.

More outgoing than her sister, Cary was a champion of women's rights and for a short time edited Revolution, a newspaper published by Susan B. Anthony. In 1848, their poetry was published in the anthology Female Poets of America edited by Rufus Wilmot Griswold and with his help, Poems of Alice and Phoebe Cary was published in 1849. Poet John Greenleaf Whittier had been invited to provide a preface; but refused. He believed their poetry did not need his endorsement and also noted a general dislike for prefaces as a method to "pass off by aid of a known name, what otherwise would not pass current".

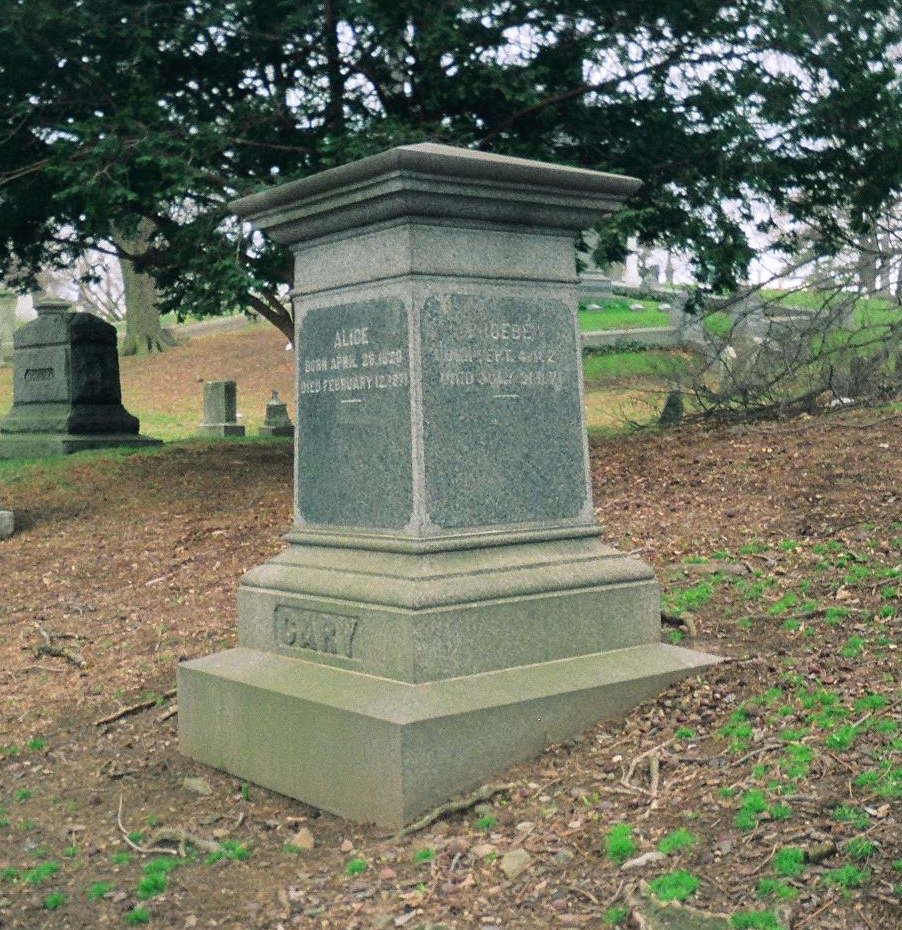
Grave of the Cary sisters

The sisters' anthology garnered much acclaim, and in 1850 they moved to New York City. There, they often hosted evening receptions on Sundays, some of which were attended by well-known figures such as P. T. Barnum, John Greenleaf Whittier and Elizabeth Cady Stanton. While in New York, Phoebe published two volumes of exclusively her own poetry: Poems and Parodies and Poems of Faith, Hope and Love. Additionally, her lyrics appeared in many church hymnals, on Sunday School cards and in household scrapbooks. One of her enduring hymns, "Nearer Home" (first line "One sweetly solemn thought"), was often sung at funerals, including Alice's and her own. In hymnals it has long been matched to the tune OZREM, composed in 1850 by Isaac B. Woodbury. Canadian composer Robert Ambrose, nonetheless, in 1876 fashioned a longer, more choral tune, specifically for Cary's lyrics. The Cary–Ambrose score became one of the most popular and widely selling pieces of sheet music in the 19th century.

In the joint housekeeping in New York, Phoebe took, from choice (Alice being for many years an invalid), the larger share of the household duties, and hence found less leisure for literary labor. She wrote very little prose, and her poetry was so different in style, so much more buoyant in tone and independent in manner, that the verses of one sister were rarely ascribed to the other.

In 1868, Horace Greeley wrote a brief joint biography of Alice and Phebe (as he spelled her name).

Alice died in 1871 from tuberculosis; Phoebe died five months later of hepatitis on July 31, 1871, in Newport, Rhode Island. Both the sisters were buried in Green-Wood Cemetery, Brooklyn, New York.

== Works ==
- Poems of Alice and Phoebe Cary (1849)
- Poems and Parodies (Ticknor, Reed & Fields, Boston, 1854)
- Poems of Faith, Hope, and Love (1867)
- A Memorial of Alice and Phoebe Cary With Some of Their Later Poems, compiled and edited by Mary Clemmer Ames (1873)
- The Last Poems of Alice and Phoebe Cary, compiled and edited by Mary Clemmer Ames (1873)
- Ballads for Little Folk by Alice and Phoebe Cary, compiled and edited by Mary Clemmer Ames (1873)
- Hymns for all Christians (1869, compiled by Charles Force Deems and Phoebe Cary)

Note: In early volumes, "Cary" was spelled "Carey" in and on Phoebe and Alice Cary's books, and later editions and volumes changed the spelling.

== After death ==
After their deaths in 1871, joint anthologies of Phoebe and Alice’s unpublished poems were compiled.

The first volume of History of Woman Suffrage, published in 1881, states, “THESE VOLUMES ARE AFFECTIONATELY INSCRIBED TO THE Memory of Mary Wollstonecraft, Frances Wright, Lucretia Mott, Harriet Martineau, Lydia Maria Child, Margaret Fuller, Sarah and Angelina Grimké, Josephine S. Griffing, Martha C. Wright, Harriot K. Hunt, M.D., Mariana W. Johnson, Alice and Phebe Carey, Ann Preston, M.D., Lydia Mott, Eliza W. Farnham, Lydia F. Fowler, M.D., Paulina Wright Davis, Whose Earnest Lives and Fearless Words, in Demanding Political Rights for Women, have been, in the Preparation of these Pages, a Constant Inspiration TO The Editors”.
