= William Cooper Procter =

American businessman (1862–1934)

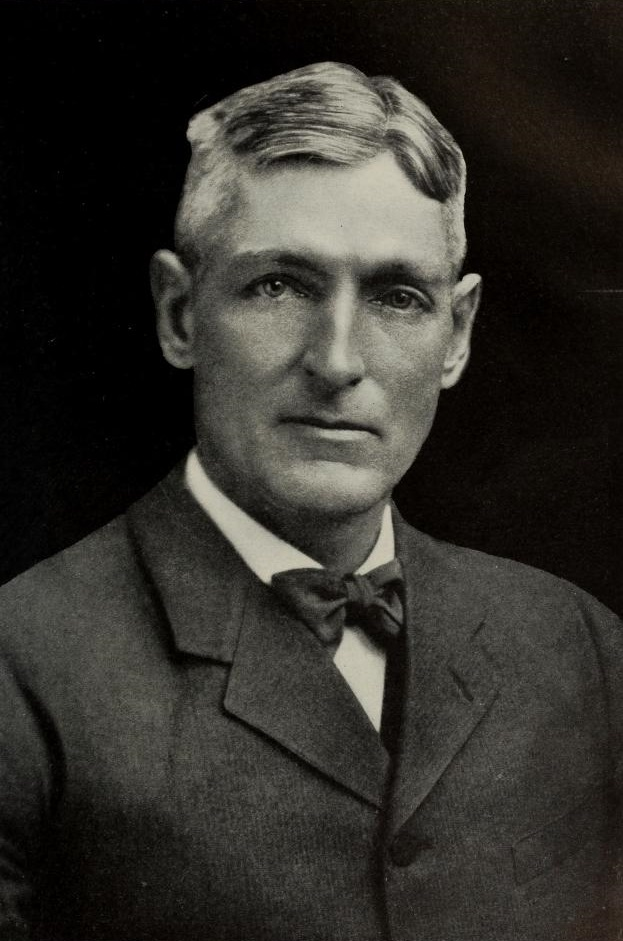
William Cooper Procter

William Cooper Procter (August 25, 1862 – May 2, 1934) was head of Procter & Gamble from 1907 to 1930 and was the last member of the founding families to lead the company.

== Biography ==
He was born on August 25, 1862. He was the grandson of William Procter, the co-founder of Procter & Gamble. He attended Princeton University and graduated in 1883.

Procter's donation to Princeton University provided for the construction of Procter Hall. It is one of several Gothic buildings designed by Ralph Adams Cram to serve as the new Graduate College, Procter Hall is particularly noted for its Great West Window, designed by William and Anne Lee Willet. Today the building serves as the college's formal dining hall and chief public space.

Procter joined the board of trustees for the Children's Hospital in Cincinnati (now known as Cincinnati Children's Hospital Medical Center). In 1921, Procter was elected president of the new board of trustees, a position he held until his death in 1934. Procter's leadership and philanthropy led to an expansion in the hospital's size, scope, mission and reputation. One of the board's first acts was to change the hospital's name from Protestant Episcopal Hospital to the Children's Hospital.

A prestigious scientific research award by Sigma Xi society, the "William Procter Prize", bears his name. Procter was awarded an elected membership in Sigma Xi in 1939 and he later endowed this award in 1950. This award recognizes outstanding contributions to scientific research and the ability to communicate the significance of the research to scientists in other disciplines. Past recipients of this award include Jane Goodall.

He died on May 2, 1934 in Cincinnati, Ohio, aged 71.

== Bibliography ==
Beatrice Katz, PhD. Images of America -- Cincinnati Children's Hospital Medical Center (2008) book
