= Alice Cary =

American writer (1820–1871)

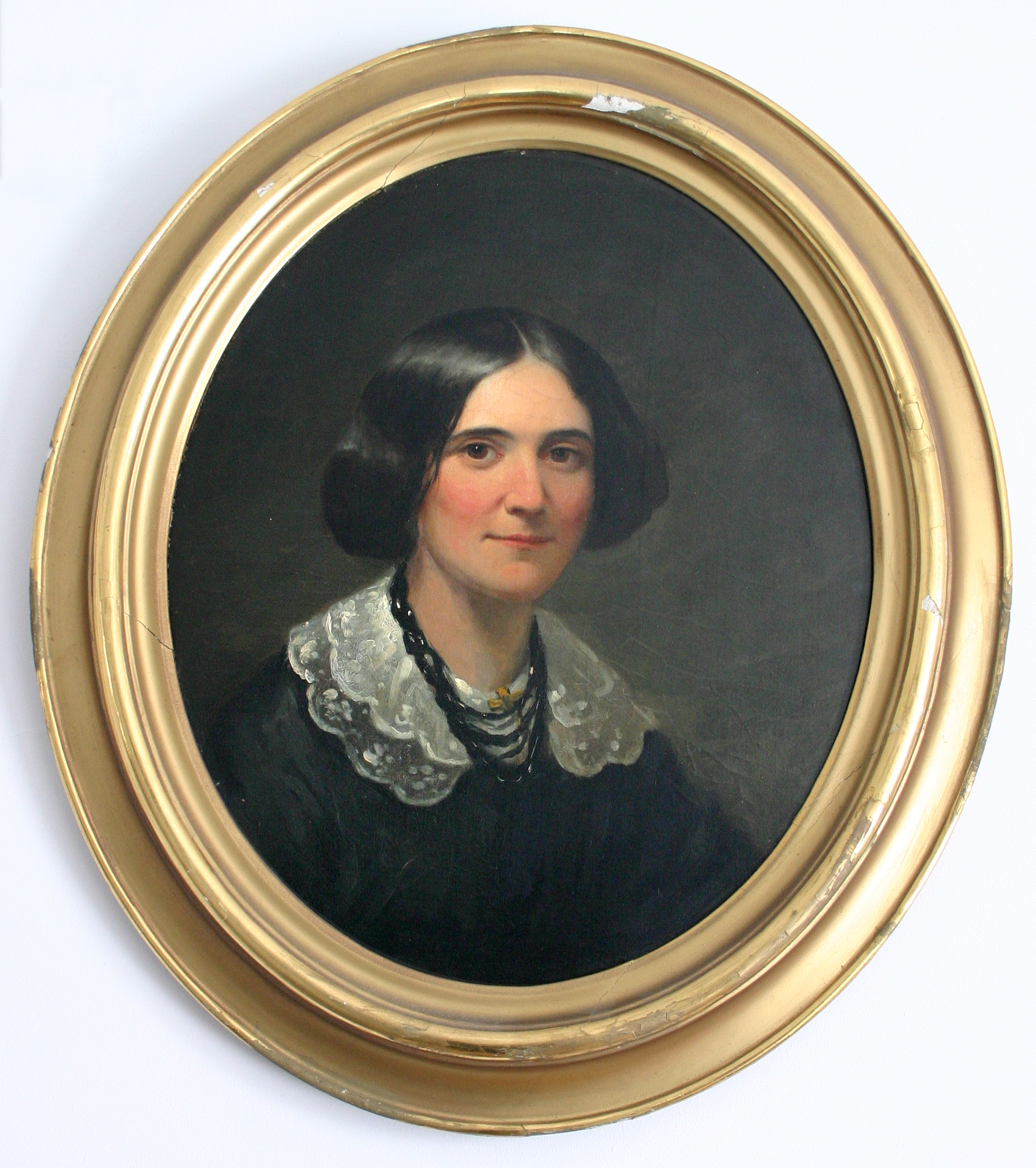
- 1850 portrait of Alice Cary in New York City which hangs in her childhood home in North College Hill, Ohio
- Born: 26 April 1820 Mount Healthy, Ohio, U.S.
- Died: 12 February 1871 (aged 50) New York, New York, U.S.
- Resting place: Green-Wood Cemetery
- Occupation: Poet

Alice Cary (April 26, 1820 – February 12, 1871) was an American poet, and the older sister of fellow poet Phoebe Cary (1824–1871), who she co-published and worked with before writing on her own.

== Biography ==
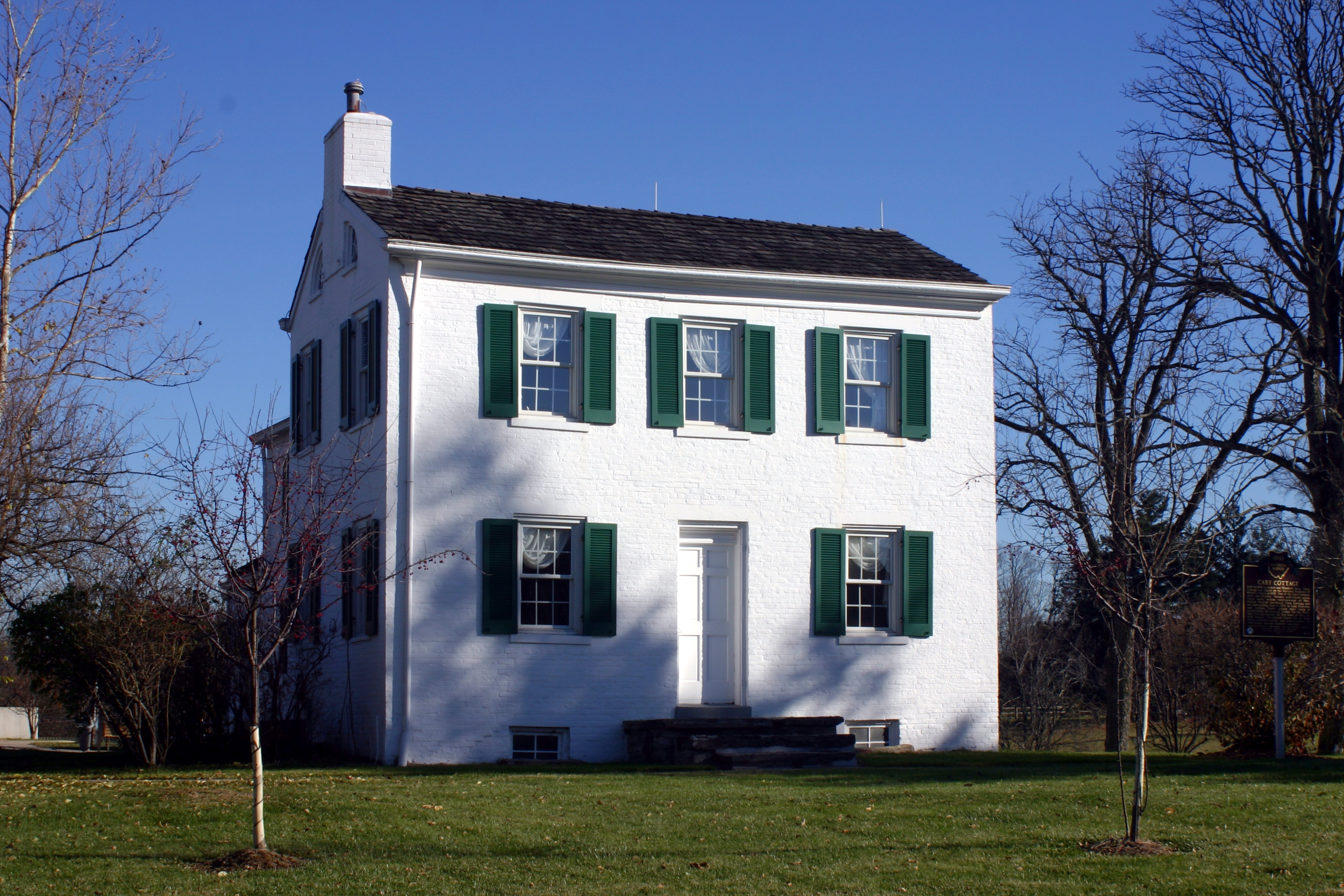
Cary Cottage, childhood home of Alice and Phoebe Cary near Cincinnati, Ohio

Alice Cary was born on April 26, 1820, in Mount Healthy, Ohio, off the Miami River near Cincinnati. Her parents lived on a farm bought by Robert Cary in 1813 in what is now North College Hill, Ohio. He called the 27 acres (110,000 m^{2}) Clovernook Farm. The farm was 10 miles (16 km) north of Cincinnati, a good distance from schools, and the father could not even afford to give their large family of nine children a very good education. But Alice and her sister Phoebe were fond of reading and studied all they could.

While the sisters were raised in a Universalist household and held political and religious views that were liberal and reformist, they often attended Methodist, Presbyterian, and Congregationalist services and were friendly with ministers of all these denominations and others. According to Phoebe,

Though singularly liberal and unsectarian in her views, [Alice] always preserved a strong attachment to the church of her parents, and, in the main, accepted its doctrines. Caring little for creeds or minor points, she most firmly believed in human brotherhood as taught by Jesus; and in a God whose loving kindness is so deep and so unchangeable that there can never come a time even the vilest sinner, in all the ages of eternity, when if he arises and go to Him, his Father will not see him afar off, and have compassion upon him.

When Alice was 17 and Phoebe 13, they began to write verses, which were printed in newspapers. Their mother had died in 1835, and two years afterward their father married again. Their stepmother was wholly unsympathetic regarding the literary aspirations of Alice and Phoebe. For their part, while the sisters were ready and while willing to aid to the full extent of their strength in household labor, they persisted in a determination to study and write when the day's work was done. Sometimes they were refused the use of candles to the extent of their wishes, and the device of a saucer of lard with a bit of rag for a wick was their only light after the rest of the family had retired.

Alice's first major poem, "The Child of Sorrow", was published in 1838 and was praised by influential critics including Edgar Allan Poe, Rufus Wilmot Griswold, and Horace Greeley. Alice and her sister were included in the influential anthology The Female Poets of America prepared by Rufus Griswold. Griswold encouraged publishers to put forth a collection of the sisters' poetry, even asking John Greenleaf Whittier to provide a preface. Whittier refused, believing their poetry did not need his endorsement, and also noting a general dislike for prefaces as a method to "pass off by aid of a known name, what otherwise would not pass current". In 1849, a Philadelphia publisher accepted the book, Poems of Alice and Phoebe Cary, and Griswold wrote the preface, left unsigned. By the spring of 1850, Alice and Griswold were often corresponding through letters which were often flirtatious. This correspondence ended by the summer of that year.

The anthology made Alice and Phoebe well known, and in 1850 they moved to New York City, where they devoted themselves to writing and garnered much fame. There, they also hosted receptions on Sunday evenings that drew notable figures including P. T. Barnum, Elizabeth Cady Stanton, John Greenleaf Whittier, Horace Greeley, Bayard Taylor and his wife, Richard and Elizabeth Stoddard, Robert Dale Owen, Oliver Johnson, Mary Mapes Dodge, Mrs. Croly, Mrs. Victor, Edwin H. Chapin, Henry M. Field, Charles F. Deems, Samuel Bowles, Thomas B. Aldrich, Anna E. Dickinson, George Ripley, Madame Le Vert, Henry Wilson, Justin McCarthy; in short, all the noted contemporary names in the different departments of literature and art might fairly be added to the list.

Alice wrote for the Atlantic Monthly, Harper's, Putnam's Magazine, the New York Ledger, the Independent, and other literary periodicals. Her articles, whether prose or poetry, were gathered subsequently into volumes which were received well in the United States and abroad. She also wrote novels and poems which did not make their first appearance in periodicals. Among her prose works were The Clovernook Children and Snow Berries, a Book for Young Folks.

In 1868, Horace Greeley wrote a brief joint biography of Alice and Phebe (as he spelled her name).

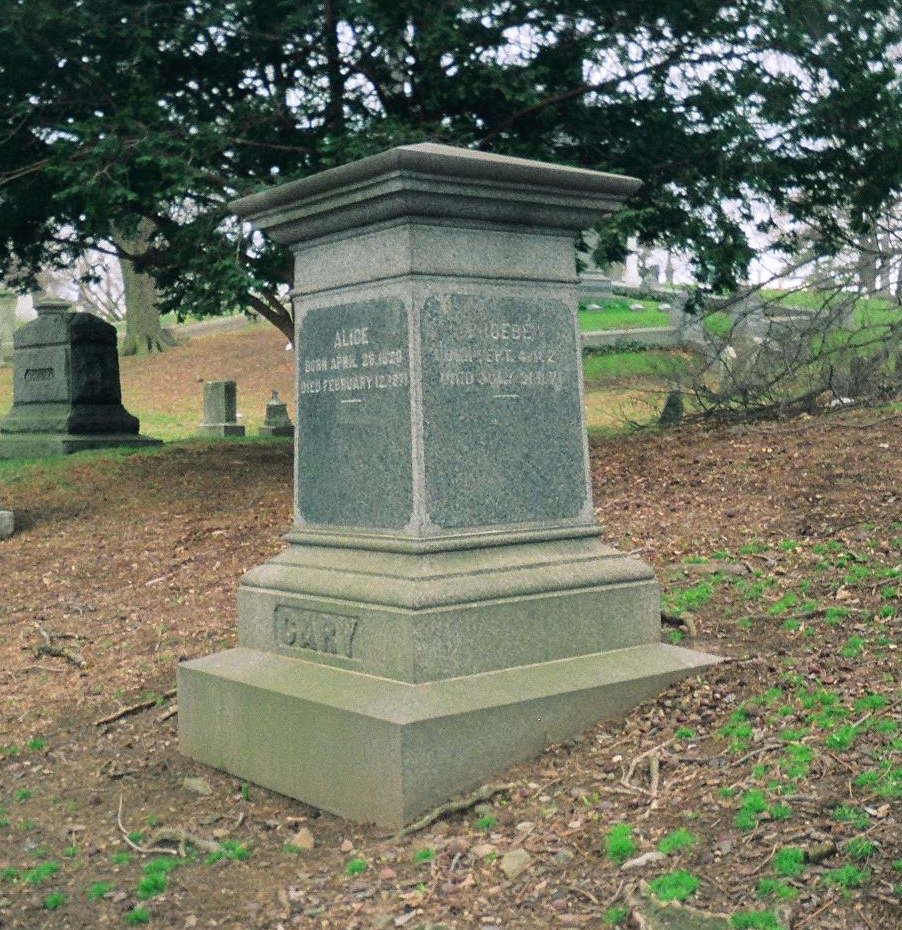
Grave of the Cary sisters

Alice died of tuberculosis in 1871 in New York at age 50. The pallbearers at her funeral included P. T. Barnum and Horace Greeley. Alice Cary is buried alongside her sister Phoebe in Green-Wood Cemetery, Brooklyn, New York.

The Cary Home stands today on the east side of Hamilton Avenue (US 127), on the campus of the Clovernook Center for the Blind and Visually Impaired in North College Hill.

== Remembrance ==
The first volume of History of Woman Suffrage, published in 1881, states, “THESE VOLUMES ARE AFFECTIONATELY INSCRIBED TO THE Memory of Mary Wollstonecraft, Frances Wright, Lucretia Mott, Harriet Martineau, Lydia Maria Child, Margaret Fuller, Sarah and Angelina Grimké, Josephine S. Griffing, Martha C. Wright, Harriot K. Hunt, M.D., Mariana W. Johnson, Alice and Phebe Carey, Ann Preston, M.D., Lydia Mott, Eliza W. Farnham, Lydia F. Fowler, M.D., Paulina Wright Davis, Whose Earnest Lives and Fearless Words, in Demanding Political Rights for Women, have been, in the Preparation of these Pages, a Constant Inspiration TO The Editors”.

== Works ==
- Poems of Alice and Phoebe Cary (1849)
- A Memorial of Alice and Phoebe Cary With Some of Their Later Poems, compiled and edited by Mary Clemmer Ames (1873)
- The Last Poems of Alice and Phoebe Cary, compiled and edited by Mary Clemmer Ames (1873)
- Ballads for Little Folk by Alice and Phoebe Cary, compiled and edited by Mary Clemmer Ames (1873)

Note: In early volumes, "Cary" was spelled "Carey" in and on Phoebe and Alice Cary's books, and later editions and volumes changed the spelling to "Cary".
