= Peter Still =

Former slave and subject of slave narrative

Peter Still (February 22, 1801 – January 10, 1868), was an American former slave, who secured his own freedom in 1850 and subsequently collected enough money to purchase the freedom of his wife and three children in 1854. His efforts were documented in the book: The kidnapped and the ransomed; being the personal recollections of Peter Still and his wife "Vina," after forty years of slavery, which his biographer Kate E. R. Pickard published in 1856.

== Biography ==
Still was born a slave to parents Sidney and Levin (formerly Steel) on a plantation owned by Saunders Griffin on the Eastern Shore of Maryland. Peter and his eldest brother Levin Jr. were sold by their owner at ages eight and six respectively, shortly after their mother had fled for a second time. After many years in Kentucky, the brothers were eventually sold to various slave-owning families in Florence, Alabama and Tuscumbia, Alabama. It was there that Peter met and married Lavinia (Vina) Sisson, a household slave from a nearby plantation, on June 25, 1826. Peter's brother Levin died in 1831, leaving Peter without a living tie to his family. Through a verbal arrangement with his last owners, Joseph and Isaac Friedman, Peter secured his manumission for $500 (~$19,350 in 2025) in April 1850. Shortly thereafter, Peter arrived in Philadelphia, where he serendipitously met his youngest brother William Still, then serving as a clerk at the Anti-Slavery Office. Through his own efforts, and those of his family, friends, and supporters, Peter was eventually reunited with his wife Vina and children Peter, Levin, and Catharine, in 1854. They resided in Burlington County, New Jersey until Peter died of pneumonia in 1868.

His brother James became a homeopathic doctor in southern New Jersey and was known as "The Black Doctor of the Pines." James also published a memoir, Early Recollections and Life of Dr. James Still, printed by J.B. Lippincott & Co. in 1877.

He is portrayed in Sanctuary Road by composer Paul Moravec and librettist Mark Campbell as an oratorio and opera. Sanctuary Road is based on the writings of his brother William. His book, titled The Underground Railroad, is a documentation of the network of secret routes and safe houses used by African American slaves to escape into free states and Canada during the early- to mid-1800s. The oratorio premiered at Carnegie Hall in May, 2018. An opera version of Sanctuary Road premiered in Raleigh, North Carolina, in March 2022. A recording is available. A video of the opera can be viewed here.

== See also ==
- Solomon Northup, abolitionist author of Twelve Years a Slave
- William Still’s book titled The Underground Railroad
