= James Still =

James Still may refer to:

- James Still (poet) (1906–2001), American poet, novelist and folklorist
- James Still (playwright) (born 1959), American writer and playwright
- James Still (doctor) (1812–1882), African-American physician, herbalist, and author
