= John K. Kane =

American judge (1795–1858)

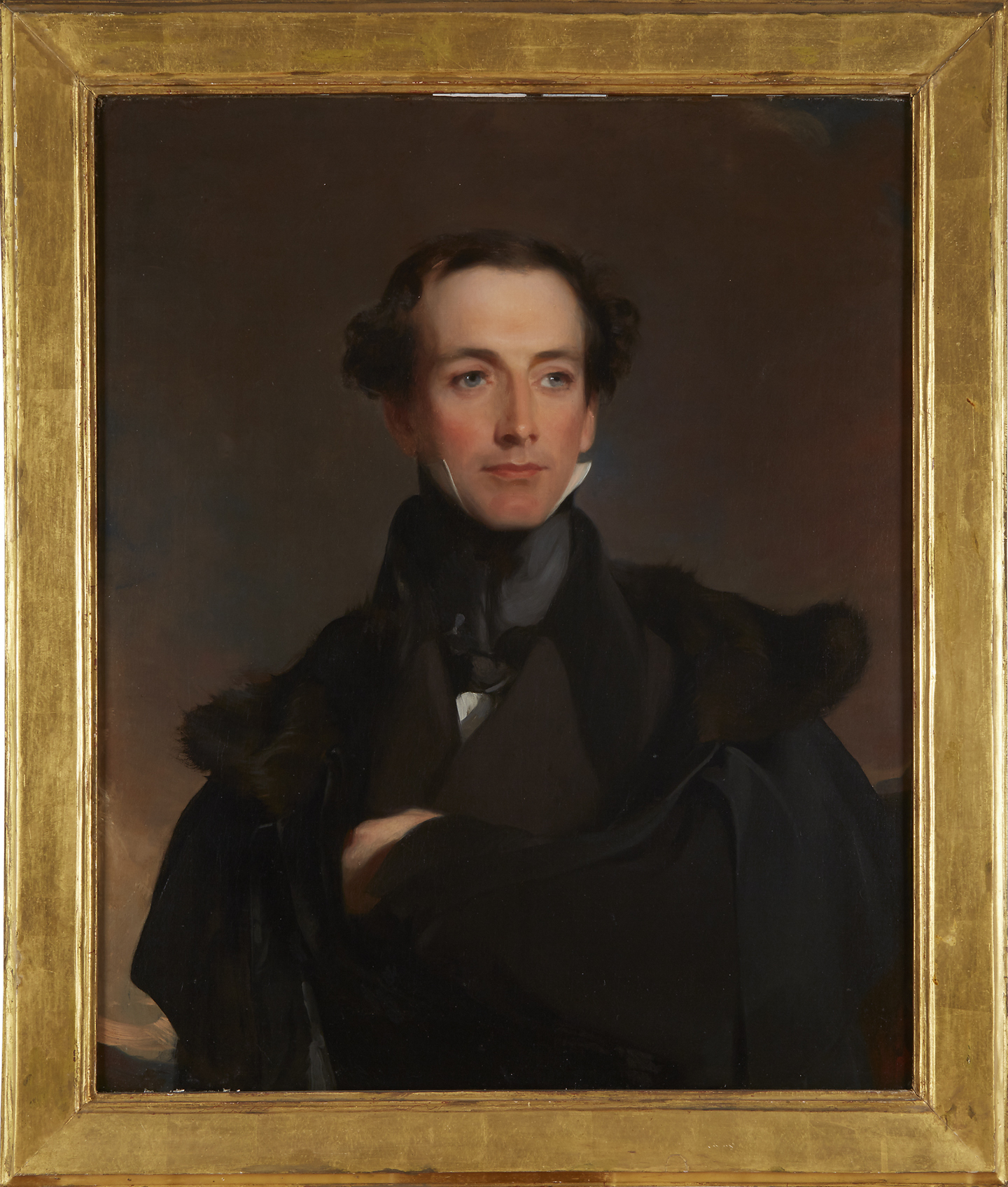
- Portrait by Thomas Sully

Judge of the United States District Court for the Eastern District of Pennsylvania
- In office June 17, 1846 – February 21, 1858
- Appointed by: James K. Polk
- Preceded by: Archibald Randall
- Succeeded by: John Cadwalader

21st Attorney General of Pennsylvania
- In office January 21, 1845 – June 17, 1846
- Governor: Francis R. Shunk
- Preceded by: Ovid F. Johnson
- Succeeded by: John M. Read

Personal details
- Born: John Kintzing Kane; May 16, 1795 Albany, New York, US
- Died: February 21, 1858 (aged 62) Philadelphia, Pennsylvania, US
- Resting place: Laurel Hill Cemetery, Philadelphia, Pennsylvania, US
- Relations: Robert Van Rensselaer (grandfather); Thomas Leiper (father-in-law); Elisha Kent Kane (son); Thomas L. Kane (son); Charles Woodruff Shields (son-in-law)
- Education: Yale University read law

John Kintzing Kane (May 16, 1795 – February 21, 1858) was an American lawyer who served as the 21st Attorney General of Pennsylvania from 1845 to 1846 and a United States district judge of the United States District Court for the Eastern District of Pennsylvania from 1846 to 1858.

== Education and career ==
Born on May 16, 1795, in Albany, New York, Kane graduated from Yale University in 1814 and read law in 1817. He entered private practice in Philadelphia, Pennsylvania from 1817 to 1824. He was a member of the Pennsylvania House of Representatives from 1824 to 1825. He was an attorney and board member of the Chesapeake & Delaware Canal Company starting in 1825. That same year, he was elected to the American Philosophical Society and served as president of the organization.

In 1828, he became active in national democratic party politics and supported Andrew Jackson. He wrote a pamphlet titled A Candid View of the Presidential Election supporting Jackson and is credited with writing many of his statements as President on national policy.

He was city solicitor for Philadelphia from 1828 to 1830, and in 1832. Jackson nominated Kane as one of the three United States Commissioners to settle claims with France from 1832 to 1836. He resumed private practice in Philadelphia from 1836 to 1845. He led the Pennsylvania Democrats versus the Whigs in the Buckshot War contesting the 1838 state elections which became so contentious the state militia was called up to protect the legislature. He was the 21st Attorney General of Pennsylvania from 1845 to 1846. As Attorney General, he led the prosecution of those arrested during anti-Catholic riots in Philadelphia during the 1840s.

== Federal judicial service ==
Kane was nominated by President James K. Polk on June 11, 1846, to a seat on the United States District Court for the Eastern District of Pennsylvania vacated by Judge Archibald Randall. He was confirmed by the United States Senate on June 17, 1846, and received his commission the same day.

He was the Federal Judge who sentenced Passmore Williamson for contempt of court due to his violation of the Fugitive Slave Act of 1850 in the case of the slave Jane Johnson. Kane's son, Thomas, resigned his position as clerk of the court in protest of the ruling and was also charged with contempt. His service terminated on February 21, 1858, due to his death in Philadelphia. He is interred in the family mausoleum at Laurel Hill Cemetery in Philadelphia.

== Family ==
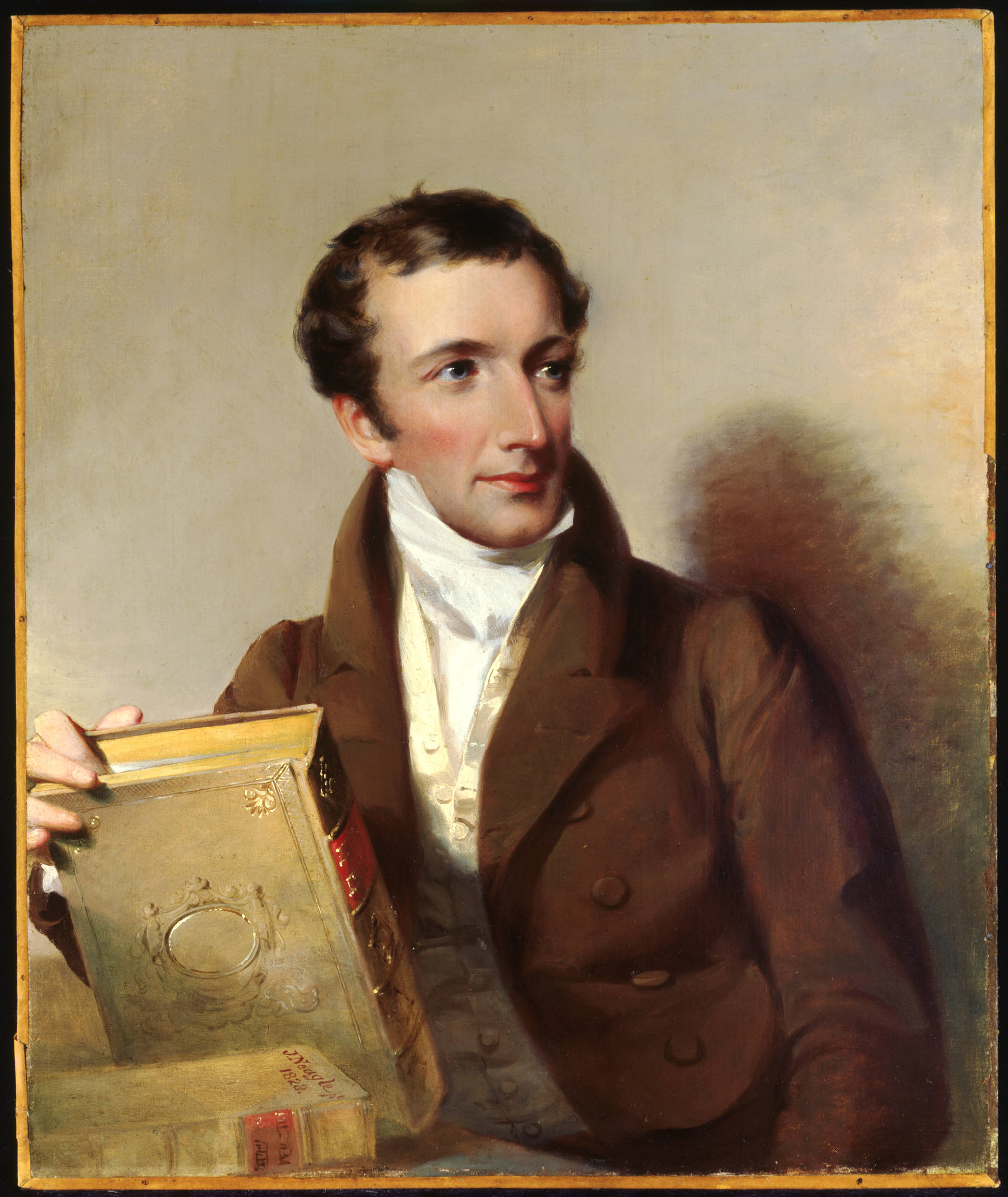
John Neagle, John Kintzing Kane, 1828, Princeton University Art Museum

Kane was descended from John O'Kane, a Latin scholar who emigrated from Ireland to America in 1750. Kane was the son of Elisha Kane and Alida (née Van Rensselaer), daughter of Brigadier General Robert Van Rensselaer and Cornelia Rutsen. When his mother Alida died in 1799, Elisha married Elizabeth Kintzing, and it was she who raised John and his siblings. In 1819, Kane was married to Jane Duval Leiper (1796–1866), the daughter of Thomas Leiper (1745–1825). Together, they had seven children, including one that died in infancy. Their daughter, Elizabeth, married Charles Woodruff Shields in 1861.

Two sons became notable as adults:

- Elisha Kent Kane (1820–1857), who was a United States naval officer, physician and explorer. He was a member of two Arctic expeditions that tried to rescue the explorer Sir John Franklin and his team.
- Thomas Leiper Kane (1822–1883), who was an attorney, abolitionist and military officer, who was influential in the western migration of the Latter-day Saints movement and served as a Union colonel and general of volunteers in the American Civil War.

== Sources ==
- Brandt, Nat; Brandt, Yanna Kroyt (2007). In the Shadow of the Civil War - Passmore Williamson and the Rescue of Jane Johnson. University of South Carolina Press. ISBN 978-1-57003-687-3.

Legal offices
Preceded by Ovid F. Johnson	21st Attorney General of Pennsylvania; 1845–1846	Succeeded by John M. Read
Preceded by Archibald Randall	Judge of the United States District Court for the Eastern District of Pennsylvania; 1846–1858	Succeeded by John Cadwalader
