= Passmore Williamson =

American abolitionist & businessman (1822–1895)

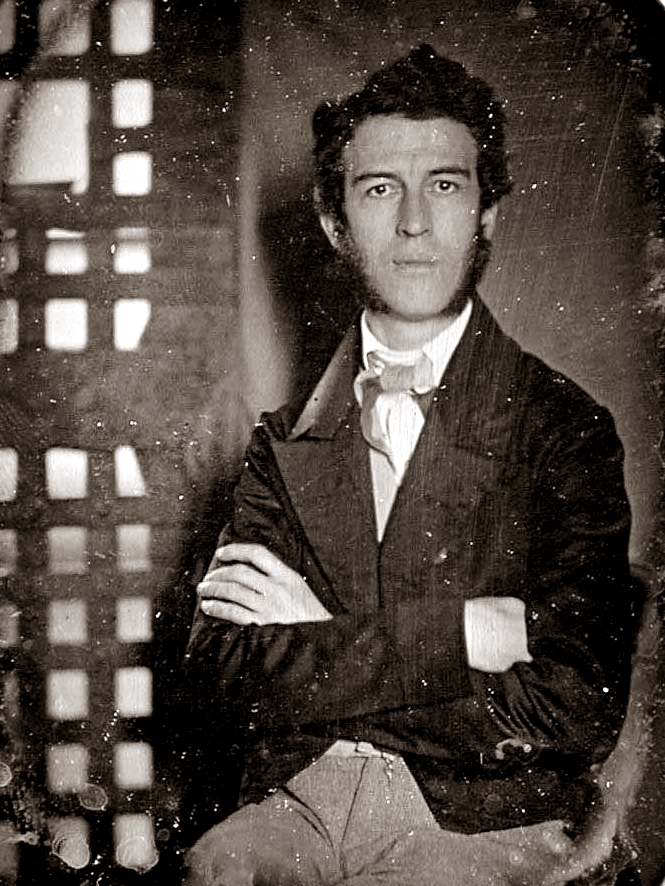
Passmore Williamson in Moyamensing Prison, 1855

Passmore Williamson (February 23, 1822 – February 1, 1895) was an American abolitionist and businessman in Philadelphia, Pennsylvania, a free state in the antebellum years. As secretary of the Pennsylvania Anti-Slavery Society and a member of its Vigilance Committee, Williamson is best known for helping Jane Johnson and her two sons gain freedom from slavery on July 18, 1855.

In a case that established legal precedent, he was served with a writ of habeas corpus by federal US District Court John K. Kane under the Fugitive Slave Law of 1850 to produce Johnson and her two sons in court. He did not know where they were held, so could not respond; Judge Kane charged him with contempt of court and sentenced him to 90 days.

The jailing of Williamson dramatically expanded news coverage of the case and generated debate about the extension of "Slave Power" over state law, as Pennsylvania did not recognize slavery. It held that slaveowners gave up their property rights in slaves if they brought them into the state; if the slave chose freedom, the state would support that decision and not compensate the owner. Thus, Johnson was not literally a fugitive, as she had gained freedom in the state according to state law, after John Hill Wheeler voluntarily took her there in the course of his travel.

== Early life and education ==
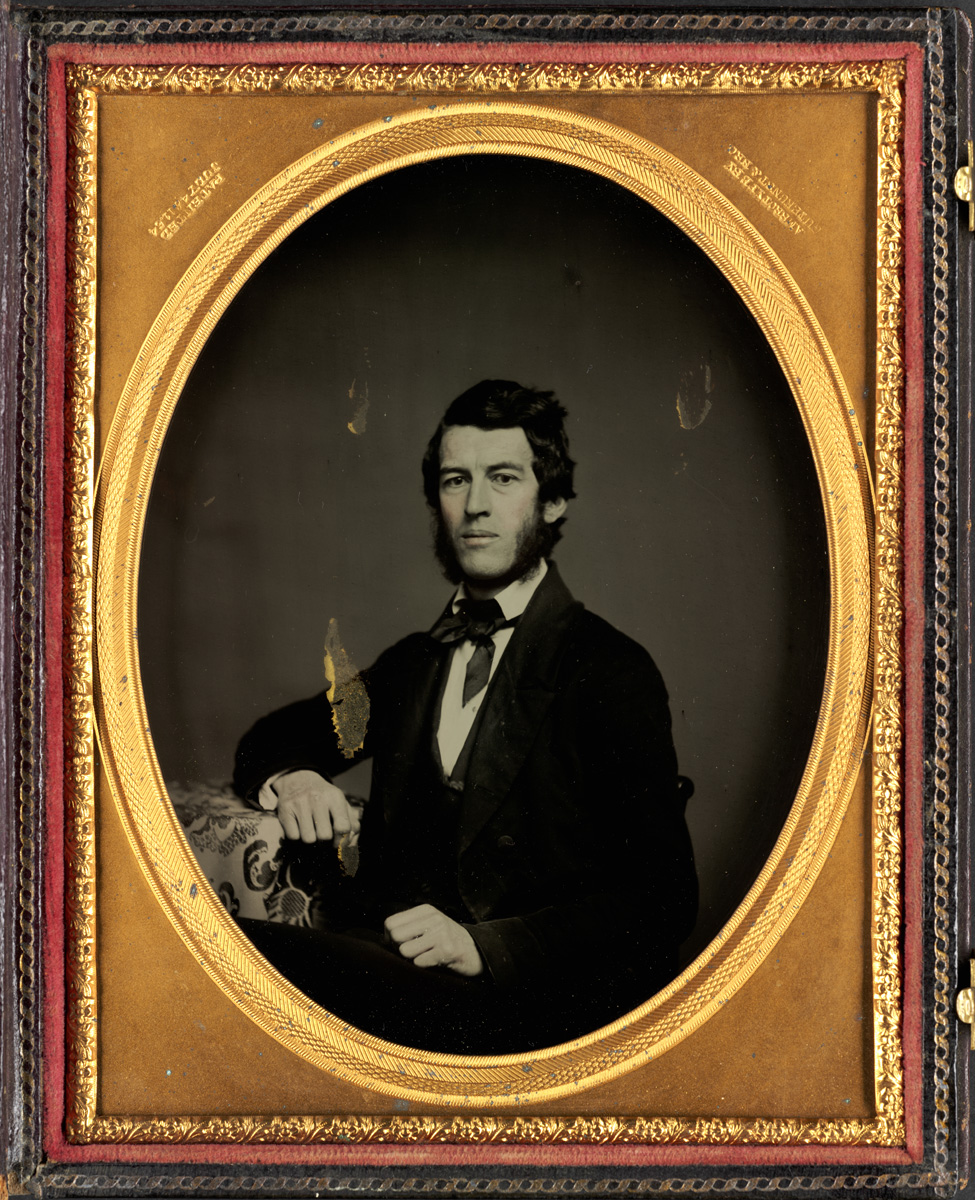
Williamson c. 1856-60

Passmore Williamson was born in 1822 as the son of Thomas and Elizabeth (Pyle) Williamson, a Quaker family in Westtown Township, Pennsylvania. He also had two sisters. In the 1840s, his family moved from Chester County into the city of Philadelphia. Like his father, the younger Williamson became a conveyancer, preparing legal documents associated with property, such as deeds and leases.

He became committed to abolitionism as an adult, joining the Pennsylvania Abolition Society in 1842, and elected its Secretary in 1848. Pennsylvania was established as a free state soon after the American Revolutionary War; it did not recognize slavery and held that masters gave up their property rights if they brought slaves to the state. Abolitionism, however, was not supported by everyone and was controversial.

== Marriage and family ==
In 1848, Williamson was disowned by the Society of Friends for his radical abolitionism and failure to attend meetings. Later that year, he married Mercie Knowles Taylor in a Quaker ceremony. They had four children together: two girls and two boys. The youngest boy was named Sumner in honor of Charles Sumner, the US Senator from Massachusetts who gave Williamson support in the Johnson case. (See below.)

== Abolitionism ==
Williamson also joined the Pennsylvania Anti-Slavery Society, a more radical group founded in 1789 with members of both races. He also participated in the Acting Committee of its Vigilance Committee, made up of men who directly aided fugitive slaves and resisted the Fugitive Slave Act after its passage in 1850.

In 1852, Williamson and the Pennsylvania Anti-Slavery Society aided the defense of men charged in the Christiana Riot, in which some black men tried to resist the capture of four fugitive slaves from Maryland. Their master, Edward Gorsuch, was killed, and other white men were wounded in the incident. United States judge for the Pennsylvania District Court, John K. Kane, ruled that the men could be tried for treason. Although 38 men were indicted, only Castner Hanway, a white man, was tried. He was acquitted by the jury in 15 minutes.

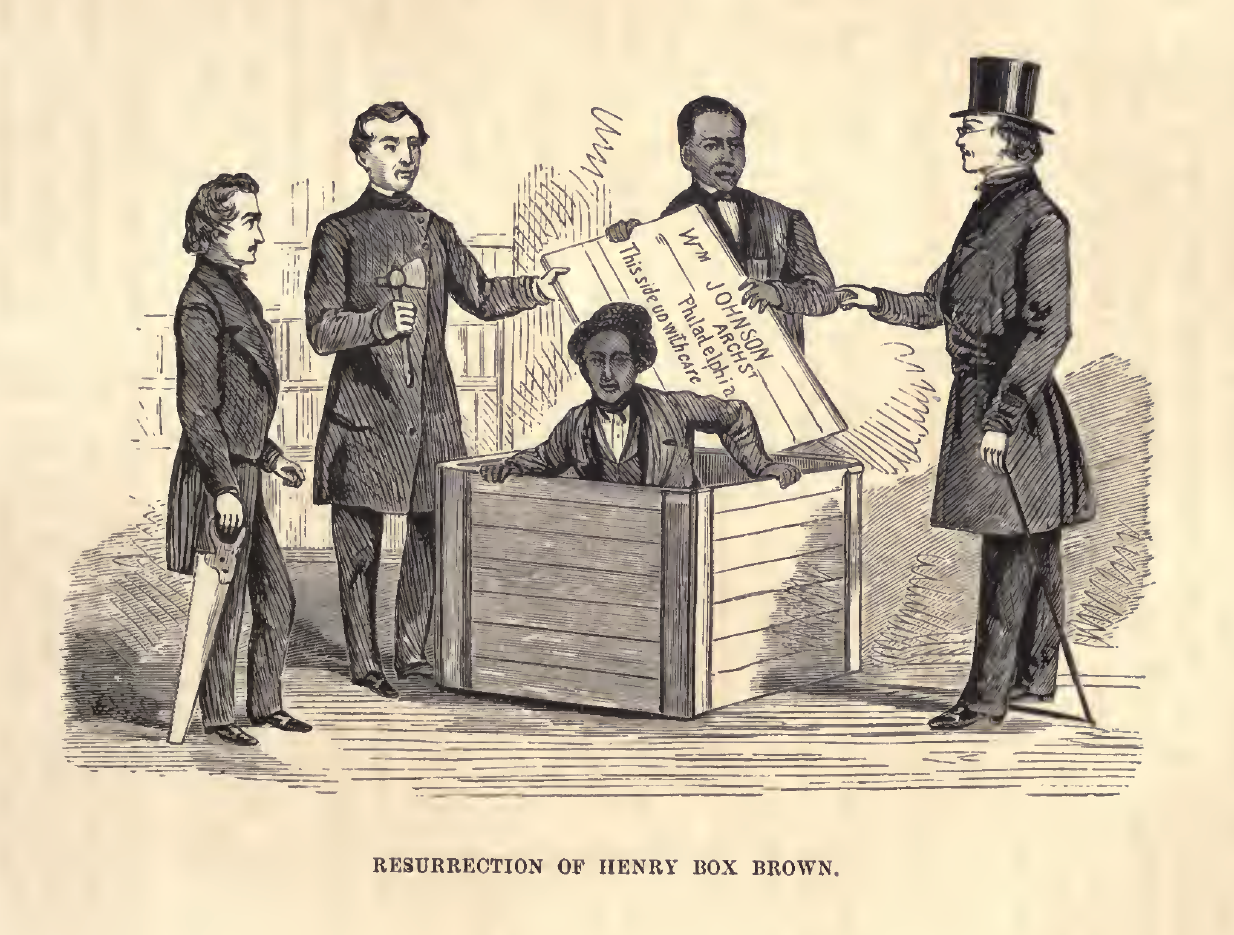
Resurrection of Henry "Box" Brown, March 24, 1849.

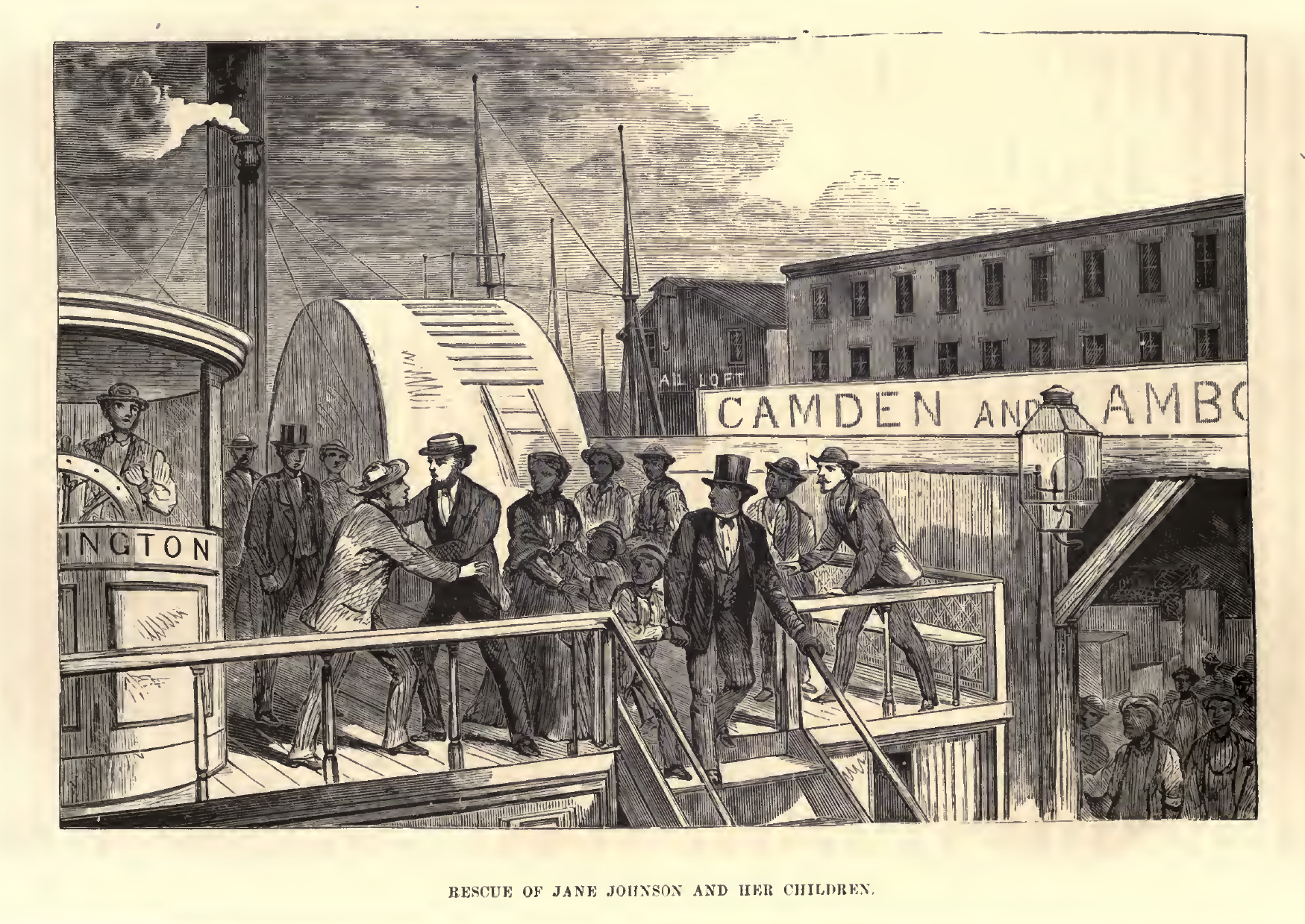
Rescue of Jane Johnson and her children, July 18, 1855.

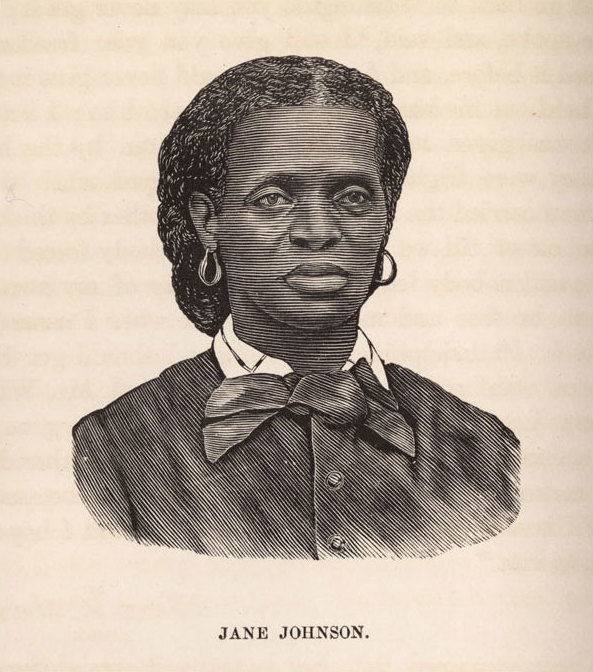

=== Henry "Box" Brown ===
Henry Box Brown was an enslaved clerk in Richmond, Virginia. The Pennsylvania Anti-Slavery Society assisted in his escape to freedom. On March 23, 1849, Brown arranged to be nailed inside a crate and mailed via private express delivery service to Williamson's place of business in Philadelphia. The next day, Williamson, William Still and other members of the Society were present when Rev. James Miller McKim pried open the crate.

=== Jane Johnson ===
Williamson helped Jane Johnson and her two sons, Daniel (age 5–6) and Isaiah (age 11–12) gain their freedom from slavery. Their enslaver, John Hill Wheeler, had been appointed U. S. Minister to Nicaragua, and he and his family and servants were en route from Washington, D.C. to New York City to board a ship to South America. Their train arrived in Philadelphia on the morning of July 18, 1855. Wheeler bought tickets for the 5:00 pm steamboat to New York City, and locked Johnson and her sons in a hotel room while his family toured Philadelphia. A former master had sold Johnson's eldest son, and she was determined that she and her younger sons would be free. Through the locked door, she asked a black porter for his assistance. He contacted William Still, a member of the Pennsylvania Anti-Slavery Society and chairman of its Vigilance Committee.

Still notified Williamson, and the two men raced to the docks as Wheeler, his family and Johnson and her sons were boarding the steamboat. Williamson informed Johnson (and Wheeler) that Pennsylvania law did not recognize the property rights of slaveholders, and she was free to leave Wheeler if she chose. As she and her two sons walked away with Still, five black deckhands helped restrain Wheeler, who tried to stop her.

Under petition by Wheeler, US District Court judge John K. Kane issued a writ of habeas corpus to Williamson to produce Johnson and her two sons in court. Still and the five black deckhands were later charged with forcible abduction, riot, and assault by Wheeler and tried in August 1855.

Judge John K. Kane charged Williamson with contempt of court for not revealing the location of Johnson and her children, but he literally did not know it, as Still had not told him. (This was common practice among the Vigilance Committee, to protect members and fugitives.) Williamson responded, noting that Johnson was not legally a fugitive under the circumstances of the case, as Wheeler had voluntarily brought her into the state, where she had the freedom to decide if she wanted to leave slavery.

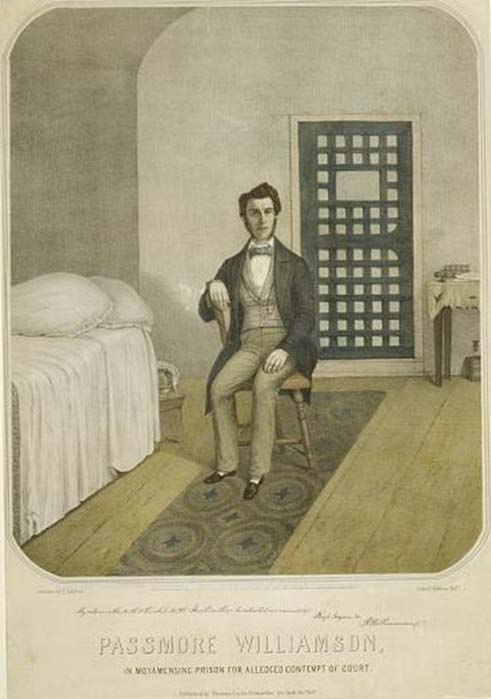
Lithographs of Williamson in prison were sold to raise money for the abolitionist cause.

Kane judged Williamson in violation of the Fugitive Slave Law of 1850, which required even citizens of free states to cooperate in returning fugitive slaves to their owners. He had dismissed an affidavit from Jane Johnson, attesting that she had not been forcibly abducted but chose to go, as "immaterial and irrelevant."

Like Williamson, commentators noted that Johnson could not properly be considered as a "fugitive slave" as she had gained freedom while in Pennsylvania, in accordance with its law. She had not reached the state after escaping from slavery, violating laws of the South, and traveling to the North. What many perceived as expansion of the Fugitive Slave Act by Kane outraged many people. Known as a Democrat, he was believed to be sympathetic to Wheeler for his property rights, and had earlier had confrontations with Williamson over slavery law.

Williamson served 100 days between July 27 and November 3, 1855, in Moyamensing Prison. His case attracted extensive press coverage, as northern publications spread the story throughout the country. "Friends comfortably furnished his cell," where he essentially held court. While imprisoned, he received numerous letters and several hundred visitors, including African-American abolitionists Frederick Douglass and Harriet Tubman, both former slaves who had escaped from the South. These are attested in his visitor book, which is held by the Chester County History Center. Lucretia Mott noted that his imprisonment was extremely helpful to the cause, and said that his father Thomas Williamson was "only afraid Passmore will come out of Prison too soon". Supporters of Williamson pressed Judge Kane for his release.

By August 29, 1855, when Still and the five deckhands were tried on charges brought by Wheeler, Johnson and her sons were living in New York. She returned for the trial, entering the courtroom hidden by a veil. She caused a dramatic stir by testifying at length that Still had not abducted her, nor any of the charged men forced her to go; she had long planned to gain freedom in the North, whether in Philadelphia or New York, during this trip. Her testimony refuted the prosecution and gained acquittal for Still and three of the men; and reduced charges and sentences for two. A reporter said they were proud of their actions and would have repeated them.

Protected by state and local officials, Jane Johnson was quickly taken out of the city, eluding federal marshals. She and her children remained free; they moved to Boston, where they settled. Johnson soon married there and worked as a seamstress. Several years later after being widowed, she married again. Her son Isaiah Johnson served in a Massachusetts Regiment of the United States Colored Troops during the American Civil War.

Claiming that he was illegally imprisoned, Williamson had filed his own writ of habeas corpus with the State Supreme Court, but it was denied. He was finally freed on November 3, suffering some health effects from jail. He sued Judge Kane for illegal imprisonment, but the case was still unsettled at the time of Kane's death in 1858.

== Other activities ==
Williamson continued to be involved in abolitionism and public service. For instance, he supported voting rights for women from an early stage.

After his father's death in 1871, Williamson invested some of his estate in speculative ventures that did not do well. His family divided over the issue, and his sisters sued him. The outcome of this case is not known.

His wife Mercie died in 1878. After his death years later, Williamson was buried next to her and his father in a Quaker cemetery in Upper Darby Township, Pennsylvania.
