= Stand by the River =

- Carey Brown, Gary Giles, James Gwathney, and Christine Clemmons in the Swarthmore College production of Stand By The River
- Music: Mark Sutton-Smith
- Lyrics: Mark Sutton-Smith
- Book: Joanne Sutton-Smith
- Basis: The life of William Still
- Productions: Hedgerow Theatre; Swarthmore College; Philadelphia Library; Rowan College; Chicago Stages Festival; The Theater at St. Clements; ASCAP Musical Theater Workshop

Stand by the River is a musical written by Joanne and Mark Sutton-Smith based on the life of abolitionist William Still, his liberation of Jane Johnson and her two sons from slavery in 1855, and the federal trial that summer.

== Production history ==
A workshop reading was held in February 2001 at the Hedgerow Theatre Company in Pennsylvania. The work was presented in New York City in an Equity staged reading, in February 2003, at the Theatre at St. Clements, directed by Larry Thelen of Goodspeed Musicals. It was produced at Theatre Building Chicago's "Stages" festival in 2003, as well as the NYC ASCAP Musical Theater Workshop in 2004.

In the summer of 2011, an abridged version of the work was produced at the Duplex Cabaret Theatre in NYC, featuring Quentin Darrington and Kenita Miller.

== Synopsis ==
Act I

The action begins in Virginia, where Jane Johnson, the slave of planter and politician John Hill Wheeler, learns that her eldest child has been sold. When she learns that Wheeler will be taking her and her two sons through Philadelphia on his way to New York City and a diplomatic assignment in Nicaragua, she swears to escape to freedom in the North with her two sons.

The focus shifts further south, where another slave, Peter Freedman, has secretly earned his freedom after many years in bondage. Strangers to each other, Peter and Jane end up on the same train, traveling north to Philadelphia. Peter is going to seek his long-lost mother, from whom he was separated as a child. Jane hopes to escape with her children once her master brings her onto free soil.

In Philadelphia, Peter begins to search the city, and Jane tries to pass a message to a black porter at her hotel. Finally, word of her desire for freedom reaches William Still at the Pennsylvania Anti-Slavery Office. At the same time, Peter walks in. When he tells his story, Still realizes that this is his own brother, left behind in slavery when his mother escaped years before, and identifies himself. But Peter is so alarmed at this unlikely coincidence that, suspecting some duplicity, he flees Still's office and quickly disappears into the streets.

Still leads abolitionists to the Camden ferry; in a dramatic confrontation on the ship, he helps Jane and her children walk away from Wheeler. Still grabs a coach and takes them into hiding. When he returns to the Society office, Still finds Peter waiting for him, and they are reunited. Still is arrested and sued for forcible abduction and riot by Wheeler for his part in the rescue of Jane Johnson.

Act II

As the second act starts, Jane Johnson and her children flee north. The trial of William Still has become a national event, pitting the values and the laws of Pennsylvania against the South, which had gained passage of the Fugitive Slave Law of 1850. Wheeler sues Still and five other African Americans in federal court under that law, to retaliate for his public humiliation.

Seth Concklin, an abolitionist inspired by William Still's action, embarks upon a quest to liberate Peter's wife, Vina, who is still enslaved in the Deep South. Though Concklin succeeds in bringing Vina north to free soil, bounty hunters pursue them and kill him in trying to recapture Vina. She is seen to elude capture, though her fate is unclear.

In the final scene, Still is brought to trial. The prosecution appears to have a strong case and the judge is known to be ally of Wheeler; but the defense introduces a surprise witness: Jane Johnson. She has come out of hiding to testify on Still's behalf. The judge orders the US marshals to arrest Jane, but she escapes, with the help of Philadelphia and state officials. Because of her testimony, Still is acquitted, as are others of the defendants. The epilogue finds Still at his desk in the Anti-Slavery office. Vina enters, seeking news of her husband, and Still helps them reunite.

== Musical numbers ==
- "How Many Thousand"
- "Who Is That Running?"
- "Gonna Leave Here"
- "A Simple Dream"
- "I’ll Remember"
- "Where Is My Lord?"
- "Joseph"
- "I Want To Be Free"
- "Stand By The River"
- "Go Now, Run Now"
- "Stand By The River – Reprise"
- "Hush My Children"
- "Put Him Down"
- "Send Him To My Door"
- "The One Left Behind"
- "America"
- "The Path Ahead"
- "Born Into Hope"
- "The Path Ahead – Reprise"
- "Where Is My Lord? – Reprise"
- "The Trial"
- "Stand By The River – Reprise"

== Awards ==
- Finalist, Richard Rodgers Awards, presented by the American Academy of Arts and Letters, 2002
- Theater Building Chicago Stages Festival, 2003
- Village Originals Festival, Seattle, 2004
- ASCAP Musical Theater Workshop, 2004
- Finalist, TAM New Voices Prize, 2004
