= Pennsylvania Anti-Slavery Society =

U.S. abolitionist organization established in 1838

The Pennsylvania Anti-Slavery Society was established in Philadelphia, Pennsylvania, in 1838. Founders included James Mott, Lucretia Mott, Robert Purvis, and John C. Bowers, Sr.

In August 1850, William Still while working as a clerk for the Society, was assisting a fugitive slave calling himself "Peter Freedman". As the escapee's story was similar to many he had heard before, it took a while for Still to realize that Freedman was his long-lost brother. It was this incident that galvanized Still's resolve and compelled him to document his work with the Underground Railroad, later published in 1872 as The Underground Rail Road Records.

In 1855, while working for the Society, Passmore Williamson and William Still helped Jane Johnson escape slavery while in Philadelphia with her master, a well-known congressman, John Hill Wheeler. As one of the first challenges to the Fugitive Slave Law of 1850 the case created a scandal, with Williamson imprisoned for several months, charged with riot, forcible abduction, and assault. The judge in the case rejected an affidavit from Johnson affirming that there had been no abduction as "immaterial". Williamson eventually turned his cell into a virtual abolitionist media center, drawing visits from luminaries like Frederick Douglass.

Robert Purvis, African American son of a wealthy white cotton broker, was a leading member during the life of the organization.

== Publications ==
The Society's newspaper, the National Enquirer, was edited by Benjamin Lundy, who had previously edited Genius of Universal Emancipation. When John Greenleaf Whittier took over in 1838, it was renamed the Pennsylvania Freeman. It was to have moved into Pennsylvania Hall but had not yet done so when the arson took place.

== Archival material ==
The Historical Society of Pennsylvania holds the minutes of all meetings of the Society, between 1837 and 1856, its account book, and other material.

== See also ==
- Pennsylvania Hall (Philadelphia)
- Philadelphia Nativist Riots
- Pennsylvania Abolition Society
- American Anti-Slavery Society
