= Jane Johnson (slave) =

African-American former slave (died 1872)

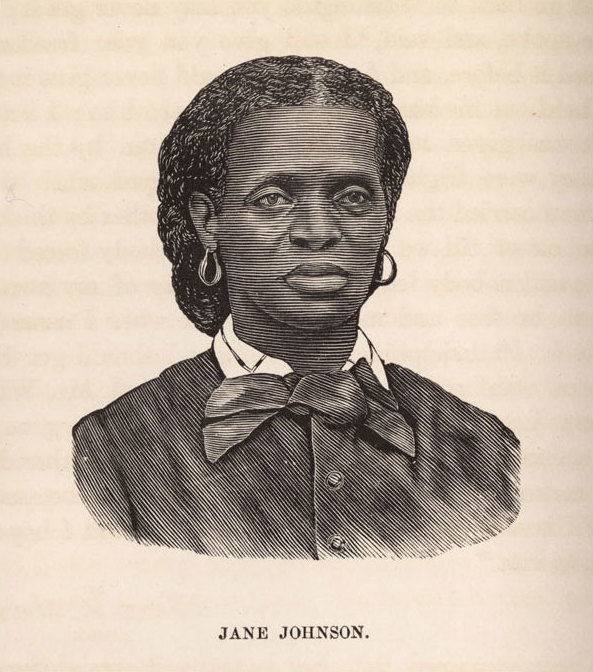
Engraving of Jane Johnson, from The Underground Railroad, by William Still, 1872.

Jane Johnson (c. 1814-1827 – August 2, 1872) was an African-American slave who gained freedom for herself and her two sons on July 18, 1855. Pennsylvania had abolished slavery within the state in the 1840s, but her enslaver, John H. Wheeler, voluntarily brought Johnson and her two young sons to Philadelphia while en route to New York City. She was aided in her escape by William Still and attorney Passmore Williamson, abolitionists of the Pennsylvania Anti-Slavery Society and its Vigilance Committee.

This resulted in precedent-setting legal cases in 19th-century Pennsylvania, as a federal judge applied the Fugitive Slave Act of 1850 in a controversial way. He sentenced abolitionist Passmore Williamson to 90 days for contempt of court for failing to produce Johnson and her sons under a writ of habeas corpus, or tell him their location. The jailing attracted even wider publicity, and widespread discussion of issues of state and federal laws related to slavery. Pennsylvania was a free state that declared that it would not recognize the property rights of any slaveholder.

Johnson returned to Philadelphia from New York in August 1855 and testified in the trial of William Still and five dockworkers, charged by her slaver John Hill Wheeler with assault. They had aided her escape. She testified at length about having planned to gain freedom in the North, and said she chose of her own free will to leave with Still, and would never go back to slavery. She helped win acquittal for Still and three men, and reduced sentences for two others. State and local officials protected her after testimony, and she and her sons soon moved to Boston, where they settled. She married again there. Her son Isaiah Johnson served in the United States Colored Troops during the American Civil War.

== Early life ==
Jane Johnson is believed to have been born into slavery under the name Jane Williams in or near Washington, D.C. Her parents were John Williams and Jane Williams. Little else is known of her early life. She married a man named Johnson and had children with him.

== Domestic slave ==
About 1853, Johnson and her two children had been sold to John Hill Wheeler (1806-1882), a planter from North Carolina and politician then working in Washington, DC. She worked as a domestic slave in his household. Her oldest son had been sold by a previous slaver to someone in Richmond, Virginia, and she never expected to see him again.

In 1855, Johnson and her sons Daniel and Isaiah (one 5 or 6, and 11 or 12, respectively), accompanied their slaver Wheeler and his family by train from Washington, D.C. en route to New York. There Wheeler planned they would take a ship to Nicaragua, where he had been appointed as the U.S. Minister. They stopped overnight in Philadelphia on the way. From there, they would proceed by steamboat to New York City to get the ship to Nicaragua.

Pennsylvania was a free state that did not recognize slavery. By its laws, slaves could choose freedom if brought to the state by their slavers. At the end of the 18th century, it had made compromises that enabled Southern members of the national government to keep their slaves in the city for up to six months; past that, they could choose freedom. At that time, the national capital was temporarily in Philadelphia.

== Choosing freedom ==
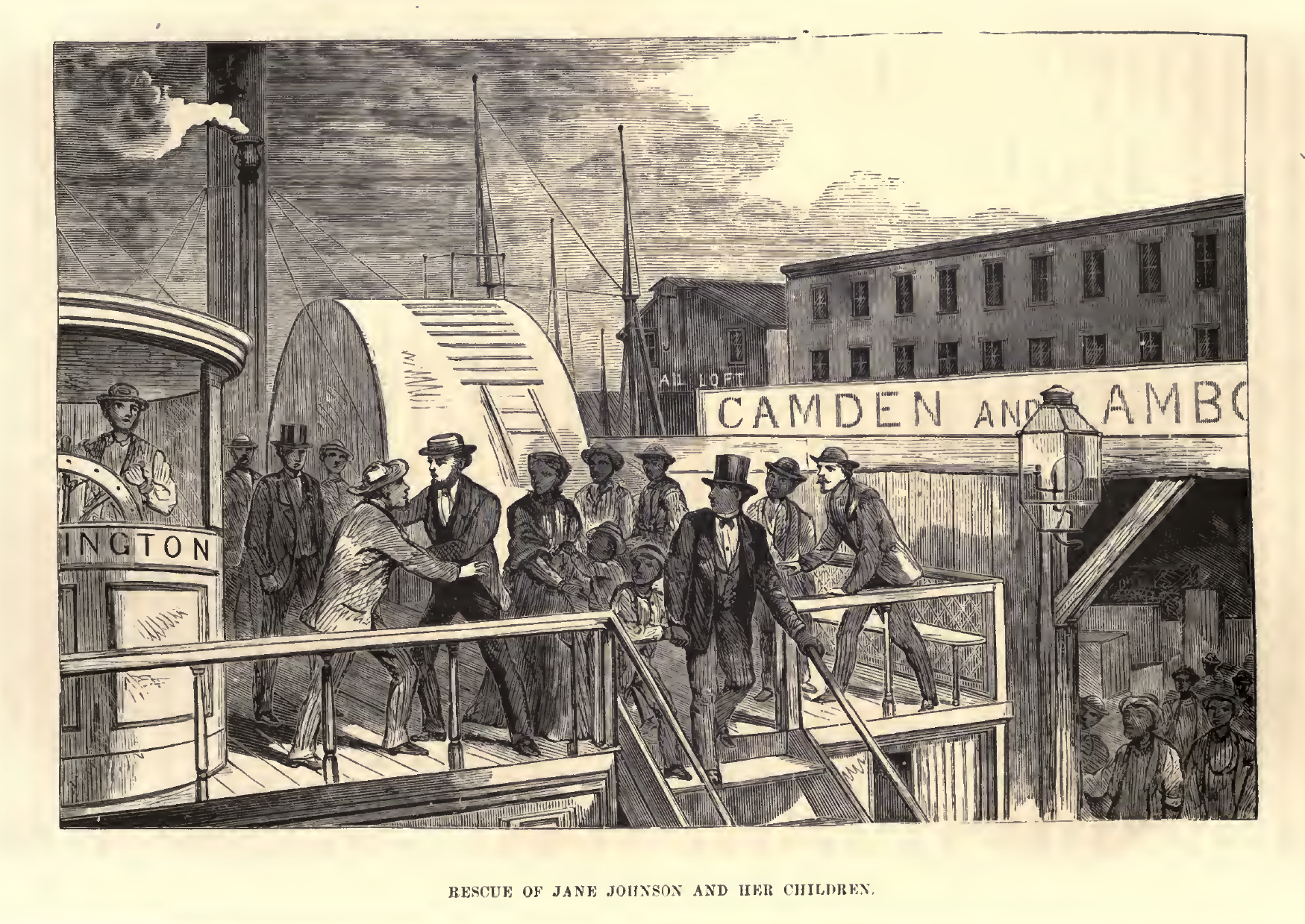
Johnson emancipates herself and her children by walking away from her former "master", John Hill Wheeler, into the free city of Philadelphia, Pennsylvania.

On July 18, 1855, Johnson passed word to a black porter in Bloodgood's Hotel, where Wheeler had locked her in with her children, that she wanted to escape her slaver's custody. He got word to William Still, chairman of the Vigilance Committee of the Pennsylvania Anti-Slavery Society, who helped fugitive slaves. Later that day, as the full Wheeler party prepared to board the ferry, Still and abolitionist Passmore Williamson, secretary of the Society, reached the docks. Still told Johnson that she could choose freedom according to Pennsylvania law. While Wheeler argued, offered her a promise of freedom, and tried to prevent Johnson from leaving, five black dockworkers restrained him, and Williamson explained the state law to him. William Still quickly escorted Johnson and her children away by a coach, later taking them secretly to his house. He never told Williamson where they were, under the principles of compartmentalization used by the Vigilance Committee.

This act became one of the first challenges to the Fugitive Slave Law of 1850, which required citizens and officials even in free states to help slaveowners capture fugitive slaves. But Johnson had chosen freedom in Pennsylvania, which was legal under its laws; she had not reached the state as a fugitive from the South.

Williamson was subpoenaed by Pennsylvania US District Court judge John K. Kane, whom Wheeler had appealed to, under a writ of habeas corpus to produce Johnson and her sons. Kane had rejected as "immaterial and irrelevant" an affidavit from Johnson saying she had not been forcibly abducted. When Williamson refused to tell where Johnson was being hidden (as he did not know since Still had taken her away), Kane charged him with contempt of court and sentenced him to 90 days in jail. They had a history of confrontation over slavery issues.

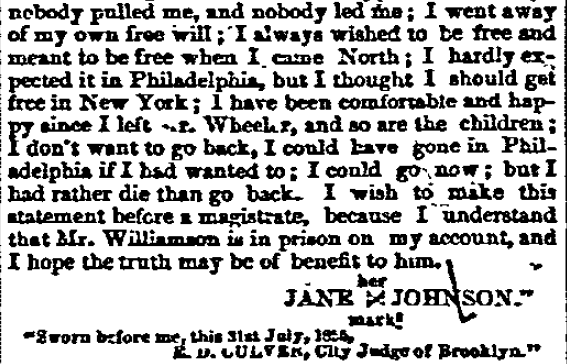
Jane Johnson's testimony in the New York Court. (777bdc24-016b-44df-84e7-bee566692cd1)

Williamson was held in jail between July 27 and November 3, 1855. His sentence aroused the anti-slavery movement, keeping the national spotlight on the issues, and he essentially "held court." He received prominent visitors from the abolitionist movement, including Frederick Douglass and Harriet Tubman, and hundreds of letters, as his case was covered by newspapers across the country.

On August 29, 1855, William Still and the five dockworkers were tried in a local court for riot and assault under charges brought by John Hill Wheeler. Jane Johnson returned from New York, where she had been staying, and created a stir by appearing and testifying in court during the trial. She entered it veiled to be hidden, and was accompanied by several women abolitionists. They had also arranged for her protection by local and state officials, who thought Kane had inappropriately gone against state law regarding slavery by his rulings with Williamson.

Johnson made a lengthy statement in court, testifying to her plans to gain freedom on that trip and overturning claims made by Wheeler's attorney. She said,

... I went away [with Still] of my own free will; I always wished to be free and meant to be free when I came North; I hardly expected it in Philadelphia but thought I should get free in New York; I have been comfortable and happy since I left Mr. Wheeler, and so are the children; I don't want to go back ... ; I had sooner die than go back.

Due to her testimony, Still and three of the dockworkers were acquitted.

Two, John Ballard and William Curtis, were convicted of assault, fined $10, and imprisoned for a week. A reporter on the scene wrote of them: 'I have just seen four of the five men who acted so brave a part of the rescue. They are very respectable looking persons, and instead of being sorry for what they did, would like nothing better than a chance to repeat the offense'.

Federal marshals pursued Johnson, but state and local officials helped her and her party. They were determined to resist what they saw as interference with the integrity of local courts.

Johnson and her children were soon helped to get to Boston, where they were safeguarded by northern abolitionists, including Lucretia Mott. They continued to live free, settling in Boston. Johnson married Lawrence Woodford shortly after her arrival there; she was widowed in 1861. She married again, to William Harris in 1864. Johnson sheltered fugitive slaves in Boston on at least two occasions.

Her son Isaiah Johnson served in the American Civil War with the 55th Massachusetts Infantry Regiment, U.S. Colored Troops. Jane Johnson died in 1872 and was buried in Everett, Massachusetts, north of Boston.

== Relation to 19th-century novel ==
In 2002 The Bondwoman's Narrative by Hannah Crafts was published, after having been authenticated by Henry Louis Gates Jr., a Harvard professor of African-American literature and history. He prepared a preface about the manuscript and his efforts to identify the author, believed to have been an escaped slave who wrote the book in the mid-1850s. This may be the first novel written by an African-American woman. It refers to John Hill Wheeler and Johnson's escape in Philadelphia.

Learning that Jane Johnson later lived in Boston, Katherine E. Flynn started to research Johnson's life, documenting her time after Philadelphia. She believed that Johnson might have written the novel, and published "Jane Johnson Found! But Is She 'Hannah Crafts'? The Search for the Author of The Bondswoman's Narrative", in the National Genealogical Society Quarterly, September 2002. In September 2013, Gregg Hecimovich, a professor at Winthrop University, published his research that documents Hannah Bond as Hannah Crafts; she was a slave at Wheeler's North Carolina plantation who escaped about 1857. She ultimately settled in New Jersey.

== Representation in popular culture ==
- Johnson's life and escape inspired Lorene Cary to write the novel, The Price of a Child (1995). It was featured as a choice in the One Book, One Philadelphia program.
- Jane Johnson and William Still are featured in the musical, Stand by the River (2003), which features Still's life and tells of Johnson's rescue from slavery in Philadelphia.
- A fictionalized version of Jane Johnson's escape is depicted by Ta-Nehisi Coates in the novel The Water Dancer (2019), in which Johnson is represented by the character Mary Bronson.

== See also ==
- John K. Kane, presiding judge
- Passmore Williamson, defendant
- List of slaves
- Prigg v. Pennsylvania
