= Charity Still =

American abolitionist

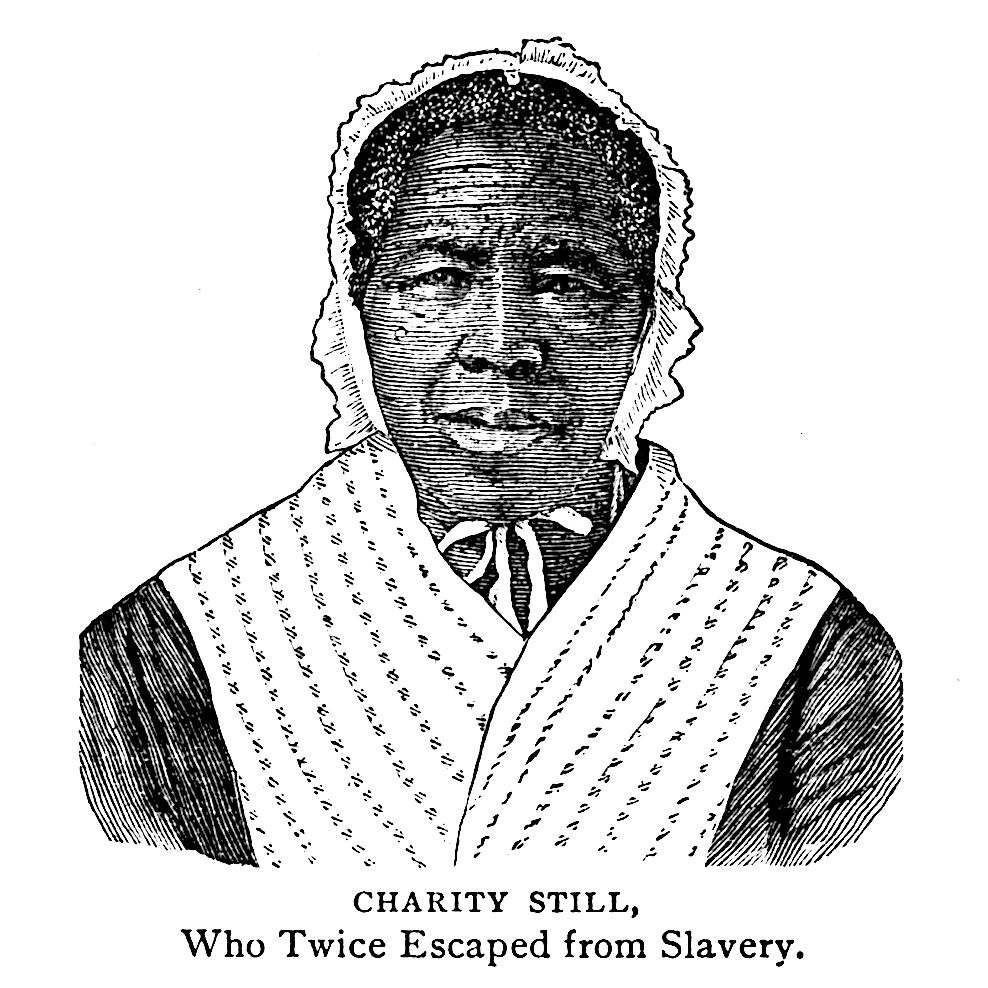
- Charity Still, from a 1902 publication
- Born: Sidney Steel c. 1765; Caroline County, Maryland, U.S.
- Died: 1857; Shamong Township, New Jersey, U.S.
- Known for: American abolitionist, matriarch of the abolition movement
- Children: 18, including William Still, Peter Still, James Still, John Still, Mary Still

Charity Still (c. 1765 – 1857) was an American abolitionist, and the matriarch of the American abolition movement. Her son William Still became a well-known abolitionist in Philadelphia, Pennsylvania; her children Peter, James, John, and Mary played roles in the abolitionist movement. She is also known as Sidney Steel, and Sidney Charity Still.

== Early life ==
Sidney (later renamed Charity) was born enslaved in the eighteenth century on a plantation owned by Saunders Griffin in the Caroline County, Maryland. When she was a child, their enslaver killed her father.

Sidney met Levin Still (or Steel) while enslaved in Maryland. They had four children together before Levin bought his freedom and moved to Shamong Township, New Jersey. She escaped with her four children, all very young, and reunited with Levin Still in New Jersey. A few months later, Charity and all the children were kidnapped and reenslaved in Maryland. On her next escape, she left behind her two sons, Levin Jr. and Peter, and reached New Jersey again with her two daughters, Mahalah and Kitturah. The older sons remained enslaved; one died from cruel treatment, and the other, Peter, eventually gained his freedom and reunited with Charity Still in 1850. He purchased his freedom and was reunited with his mother in 1850. He lived the rest of his life in Burlington Township, New Jersey.

She gave birth to 18 children, and 4 of those children are assumed to have died at childbirth.

== Life in the North ==
Levin and Charity Still moved into a secluded area of the Pine Barrens, Shamong Township, New Jersey, where their other children were born to prevent another kidnapping. Their youngest son was William Still (c. 1821–1902), a Philadelphia businessman who worked with the Pennsylvania Society for the Abolition of Slavery. In his obituary in The New York Times, William was described as "The Father of the Underground Railroad". The term "Underground Railroad" for the network of people, vehicles, and buildings used to aid people escaping slavery. He assisted hundreds of people seeking freedom. Another son, James Still, was denied formal medical training and worked as an herbalist healer in the African-American community. James's home and medical office were located in Medford, New Jersey.

Charity Still died in 1857 at the age of about 92. One of Charity Still's granddaughters was William's daughter, Caroline Still Anderson (1848–1919), who became a physician.
