= Henry Charlton Beck =

American author (1902–1965)

- Born: Henry Charlton Beck; May 26, 1902; Philadelphia, Pennsylvania, U.S.
- Died: January 16, 1965 (aged 62); Robbinsville, New Jersey, U.S.
- Education: Haddonfield Memorial High School; University of Pennsylvania
- Occupations: Writer, historian, editor, folklorist, clergyman, educator, journalist
- Spouse: Isabel Ellis Beck
- Children: Ann Phillips (daughter)
- Writing career
- Language: English
- Years active: 1920–1965
- Genres: Mystery novels, history, folklore, religion
- Subjects: New Jersey history and folklore, murder mysteries, Christian humor
- Notable works: Forgotten Towns of Southern New Jersey, More Forgotten Towns of Southern New Jersey, The Roads of Home: Lanes and Legends of New Jersey

Rev. Henry Charlton Beck (May 26, 1902 – January 16, 1965) was an author, journalist, historian, ordained Episcopal minister and folklorist. He authored six books about New Jersey history, forgotten towns, and regional folklore which were published by E.P. Dutton & Co. and later reprinted by Rutgers University Press. He chronicled vignettes and anecdotal remembrances about such quaint—and often vanished—New Jersey locales as Ong's Hat, Penny Pot, Recklesstown, Apple Pie Hill, Calico, Varmintown, Pickle's Mountain, and Owltown.

"Meaningful names like Shiloh, or Mount Hermon, or Buttermilk Pond stay much longer than those who named them and knew why," he wrote. "Thus I hope always to see, in what there is, at least a wavering shadow of what there used to be." Beck described his curiosity as reflecting "the romance of decadent things."

== Life and writing career ==
Beck was born in Philadelphia, Pennsylvania., and was nine years old when his family moved to Haddonfield, New Jersey. He was educated at Haddonfield Memorial High School and the University of Pennsylvania. He began his journalism career at the Camden Courier-Post, where he eventually became State Editor. In addition to working at the Camden Courier-Post, Beck held an editorial position at the Philadelphia Evening Bulletin. He also served as editor of Pathfinder magazine.

In the 1930s, Beck wrote five detective novels (some under the name Henry C. Beck). All plots revolved around newspaper and newsroom settings. Ironically, newspaper reviews of these books were not impressive.

While employed as a reporter at the Courier-Post in the early 1930s, he began to write about small southern New Jersey towns. Eventually he came to specialize in the state's rich folklore, criss-crossing the state and interviewing hundreds of its citizens about local legends and lore. In 1936, publisher E.P. Dutton collected these charming stories and published them under the title Forgotten Towns of Southern New Jersey. A January 1937 review in The New York Times explained:

Mr. Beck, a Camden editor, set out one day to find a place whose name had long been merely laughed at—Ong’s Hat. He found the site of the settlement, and the last inhabitants, and the story behind the absurd name. And this so captured his imagination and stimulated his ambition that he went all over Southern New Jersey seeking other lost towns. He found so many that he had now brought out a book of thirty-seven chapters, each chapter dealing with a different community; some, indeed, with two or three.

While interviewing strangers about their towns, he said, "I learned many things. One of these was that those most reluctant to talk say loudly afterward that they were overlooked when I came around. Another was that others with things to say knew little for certain, but this in no way prevented sieges of volubility. Still others who seemed shy and, from appearances, lacking in what I sought, were revealed as among my best sources." For 18 years he wrote a history column entitled "Jerseyana" for the Sunday Newark Star-Ledger.

In a New York Times review about his 1956 book, The Roads of Home: Lanes and Legends of New Jersey, Nash K.Burger wrote, "None of this is orderly, store-bought legend or folklore. This is the way people talk, sought out and recorded by one who loves both the people and the talk."

William Hugh Jansen, in a 1945 review of Beck's Jersey Genesis, offered a profile of Beck's approach to chronicling local lore:

Not far removed from the Ain’t-Nature-Grand school of nonfiction ... is the these-are-the-people-unspoiled-by-the-world-outside school. And to that school, I fear, belong Mr. Beck and his latest book. And lest it be thought that I am facetious, Mr. Beck himself applies the terms “unspoiled by the world outside, entirely uncontaminated” to the finely-drawn old — and they are almost all old in years — men and women who people the banks of southern New Jersey’s Mullica River, the setting of his book. For all his attitude of the man of the world looking at the “natives,” Mr. Beck upholds the unpalatable thesis that these people have chosen the blessings of their pastoral life in the little river towns in preference to the humdrum monotony of the complicated metropolitan life. Mr. Beck says he originally intended a novel. In some ways, the published product reads like the notes for a novel. But the author says he surrendered the idea of a novel because of his fear that nothing except the setting would be believed. According to him, “The truth is ... almost too good. ... All these people are real. These villages are as I know them and as these people know them.”

A 1967 posthumous biographical profile of Beck noted, "His knowledge of the state made him the logical choice to be editor of Rutgers University Press for a brief tenure (1945–1947). His emphasis on folklore led to the founding [in 1945] of the New Jersey Folklore Society, with Henry C. Beck the only possible choice for president." He held this position until the group disbanded in 1950.

Despite his writing's focus on the past, Beck was keen to link events long ago with the present to demonstrate that across centuries, much human behavior does not change. In his story "Fairfield, Fairton, New England Crossroads," from Forgotten Towns of Southern New Jersey, Beck described an 18th-century colonial-era clash between an existing community and new arrivals.

The sudden mingling of these people, those who had been Puritans seeking a new kind of freedom, and West Jersey colonists, resenting in some measure the intrusion, provided an atmosphere charged with all sorts of lightning. Each faction sought favor with the Royal Governors to its own advantage. Judges, justices and jurors were chosen through backstage maneuvering. Devices and trickery, often looked upon as the modern legacy of politics, were employed in all forms during those early days. Illegal votes were counted. Legal ballots were thrown out if they weren't on the chosen side. Clamor of riots often disturbed the villages and their polling places.

Beck was one of the first journalists to write about Dr. James Still, the legendary "Black Doctor of the Pines," whose obscure, self-published 1877 autobiography had been discovered just a few years before Beck published his essay, "The Doctor of the Pines," in his 1936 book Forgotten Towns of Southern New Jersey.

Many locations about which Beck wrote were accompanied by photographs taken by William F. Augustine, whose work is preserved at the Rutgers University Special Collections and University Archives.

== Career as a cleric ==
In the late 1940s he served as director of field and publicity for the Diocese of New Jersey and as editor of the diocese's newsletter, Church News. He was ordained an Episcopal priest in 1949.

In the late 1940s he served as deacon of St. Matthew's Church in Pennington, and as rector of Calvary Church in Flemington from 1950 to 1956. In addition, he was vicar of St. George's Church, York Harbor, Maine.

He collaborated with cartoonist W. Bolte Gibson on a series of books of clerical humor, including Fun in Church (1952), Clerical Errors (1955), No Jack in the Pulpit (1959), Lapses in the Apses (1961), and others (full bibliography below).

== Death ==
Beck died of a heart attack at home in Robbinsville, New Jersey, on January 16, 1965. He is buried at Harleigh Cemetery, Camden, New Jersey.

John T. Cunningham eulogized Beck in a "Note About the Author" profile in a posthumous reprint of Beck's 1964 book Tales and Towns of Northern New Jersey:

He was a concert violinist, an author, an Episcopal priest. He taught in a one-room school, labored as a young Camden newspaperman, won state-wide fame as a folklorist. He led tours in the New Jersey Pine Barrens and lectured everywhere. He was the first to write extensively about the state, and he wrote with such warmth and enthusiasm that at least two generations of people who believe in New Jersey fell under his spell and owe an enduring debt to him. Despite his accomplishments, he never became pompously serious.

Henry C. Beck Middle School in Cherry Hill, New Jersey was named after him.

== Books ==
=== Fiction ===
- Murder in the Newsroom (E.P. Dutton, 1931)
- Cakes to Kill (E.P. Dutton, 1932)
- Society Editor: A Newspaper Mystery Story (E.P. Dutton, 1932)
- Death by Clue (E.P. Dutton, 1933)
- Murder in the Newspaper Guild (E.P. Dutton, 1937)

=== Non-fiction ===
- Forgotten Towns of Southern New Jersey (E.P. Dutton, 1936; Rutgers University Press, 1961)
- More Forgotten Towns of Southern New Jersey (E.P. Dutton, 1937; Rutgers University Press, 1963)
- Fare to Midlands: Forgotten Towns of Central New Jersey (E.P. Dutton, 1939)
- Jersey Genesis: The Story of the Mullica River (Rutgers University Press, 1945, 1963)
- The Roads of Home: Lanes and Legends of New Jersey (Rutgers University Press, 1956)
- A New Jersey Reader (various authors anthology, foreword by Beck; Rutgers University Press, 1961)
- The Jersey Midlands (retitled reprint of Fare to Midlands: Forgotten Towns of Central New Jersey; Rutgers University Press, 1962)
- The Old Mine Road (by C.G. Hine, Introduction by Beck; Rutgers University Press, 1963)
- Tales and Towns of Northern New Jersey (Rutgers University Press, 1964)

=== Cartoon books (with W. Bolte Gibson) ===
- Fun in Church (Calvary Church/Trenton Printing Co., 1952)
- More Fun in Church (Calvary Church/Trenton Printing Co., 1953)
- Lapses in the Apses (Calvary Church/Trenton Printing Co., 1954)
- Clerical Errors (Gilbert Press, 1955)
- No Jack in the Pulpit (Trenton Printing Co., 1956)
- Dearly Beloved Brethren (Trenton Printing Co., 1958)
- Excess Prophets (Trenton Publishing Co., 1960)
- There’s One in Every Parish (Morehouse-Barlow Co., 1966)
