= New Jersey Folklore Society =

American academic organization

The New Jersey Folklore Society is an academic organization that formed in an attempt to spread awareness about folklore. The group took trips throughout New Jersey and produced a yearly publication.

== Description ==
The New Jersey Folklore Society is a social group that was formally organized in May 1945 at the behest of the New Jersey Council at Rutgers University. During their first few months of operation, they gained affiliation with and became a chapter of the American Folklore Society, a larger and more recognized group. They met monthly in various locations across the state, and produced a yearly publication highlighting New Jersey myths and legends.

The organization drafted a constitution and elected leaders, the first being Henry Charlton Beck. Beck, a minister and scholar who became ordained during the time he led the group at Rutgers University Press, was an editor for the Camden Courier-Post and writer for the Newark Star-Ledger. At its peak, the organization had roughly fifty members. Beck headed the society until it went dormant and disbanded in 1950. It was revived and returned to activity in the 1980s.

== Publications ==
The society gained exposure due to its publications, which include collections of old songs and ballads from towns surrounding the Ramapo Mountains and other topics. After the re-emergence of the club in the 1980s, they focused on producing bigger articles and pamphlets that covered a larger range of topics. These articles, which were all titled New Jersey Folklife, were presented to the New Jersey Folk Festival each year until 1991.

== General references ==
- "Folklore News." The Journal of American Folklore, vol. 59, no. 231, 1946, pp. 72–73.
- "Folklore News." The Journal of American Folklore, vol. 63, no. 250, 1950, pp. 470–471.
