= List of federal judges appointed by John Tyler =

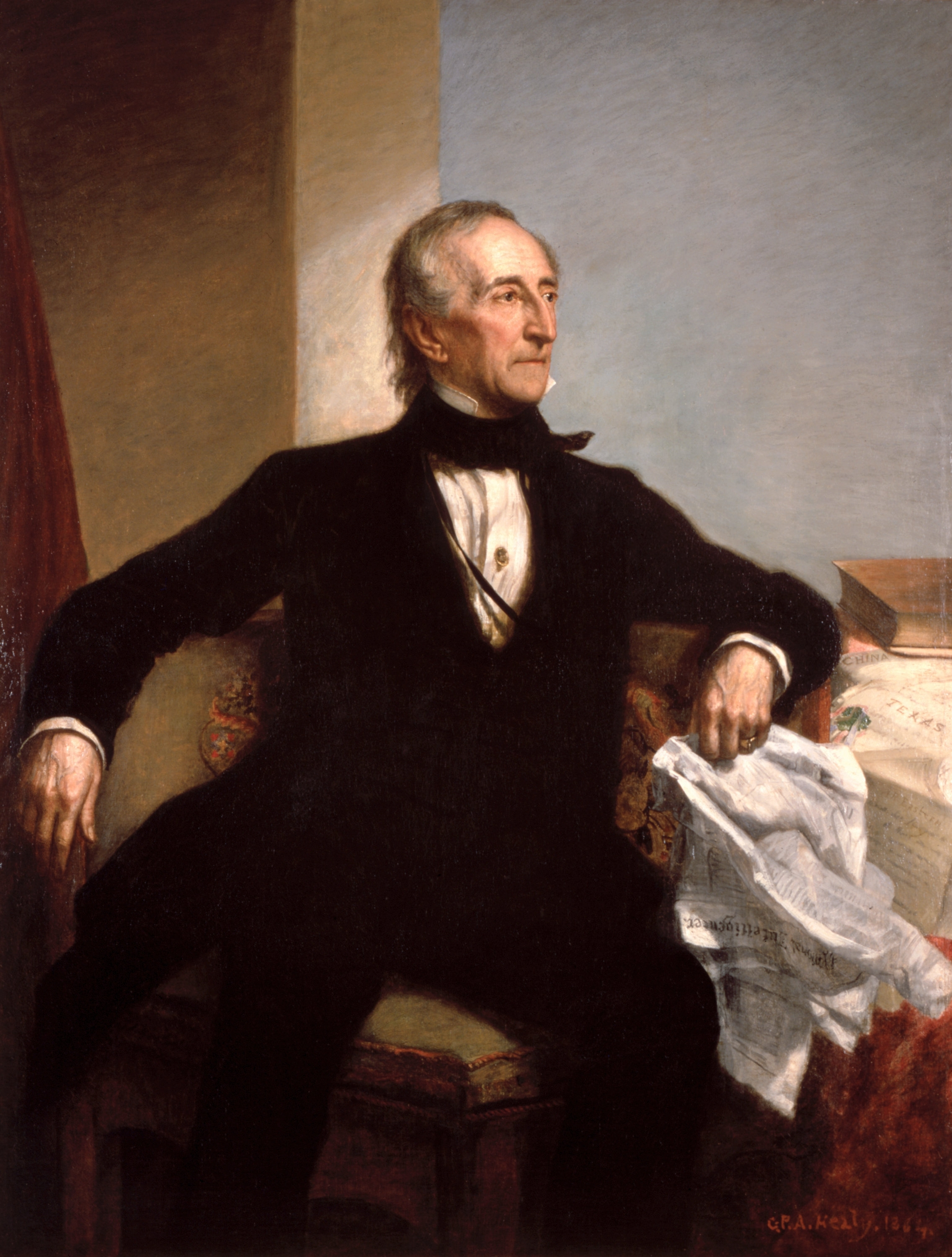
John Tyler

Following is a list of all Article III United States federal judges appointed by President John Tyler during his presidency. (Note: All information on the names, terms of service, and details of appointment of federal judges is derived from the Biographical Directory of Federal Judges, a public-domain publication of the Federal Judicial Center.) In total Tyler appointed 7 Article III federal judges, including 1 Justice to the Supreme Court of the United States and 6 judges to the United States district courts.

Two vacancies occurred on the Supreme Court during Tyler's presidency, as Justices Smith Thompson and Henry Baldwin died in 1843 and 1844, respectively. Tyler put forward five men for Supreme Court confirmation a total of nine times. John C. Spencer, Reuben Walworth, Edward King all had their nominations scuttled more than once, and the full Senate never acted on John M. Read's nomination. Tyler's four unsuccessful nominees are the most for any U.S. president to date.

== United States Supreme Court justices ==
#	Justice	Seat	State	Former justice	Nomination date	Confirmation date	Began active service	Ended active service
1	Samuel Nelson	1	New York	Smith Thompson	February 4, 1845	February 14, 1845	February 13, 1845	November 28, 1872

== District courts ==
#	Judge	Court (Note: See List of United States district and territorial courts)	Nomination date	Confirmation date	Began active service	Ended active service
1	Peleg Sprague	D. Mass.	July 15, 1841	July 16, 1841	July 16, 1841	March 13, 1865
2	Theodore Howard McCaleb	E.D. La. W.D. La.	September 1, 1841	September 3, 1841	September 3, 1841	January 28, 1861 (Note: Reassigned by operation of law to the United States District Court for the District of Louisiana on February 13, 1845. Reassigned by operation of law to the United States District Court for the Eastern District of Louisiana on March 3, 1849.)
3	Archibald Randall	E.D. Pa.	March 3, 1842	March 8, 1842	March 8, 1842	June 8, 1846
4	Samuel Prentiss	D. Vt.	April 8, 1842	April 8, 1842	April 8, 1842	January 15, 1857
5	Elisha Mills Huntington	D. Ind.	April 26, 1842	May 2, 1842	May 2, 1842	October 26, 1862
6	James Dandridge Halyburton	E.D. Va.	June 15, 1844	June 15, 1844	June 15, 1844	April 24, 1861

== Sources ==
- Federal Judicial Center
