= Archibald Randall =

American judge

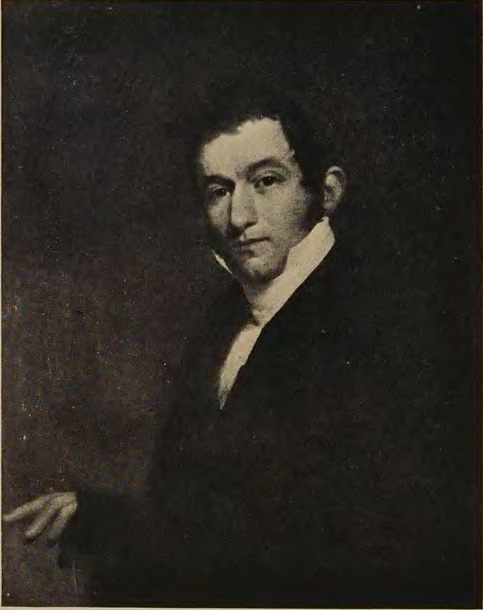
- portrait by John Neagle

Judge of the United States District Court for the Eastern District of Pennsylvania
- In office March 8, 1842 – June 8, 1846
- Appointed by: John Tyler
- Preceded by: Joseph Hopkinson
- Succeeded by: John K. Kane

Personal details
- Born: Archibald Randall; May 24, 1797 Philadelphia, Pennsylvania
- Died: June 8, 1846 (aged 49) Philadelphia, Pennsylvania
- Education: read law

Archibald Randall (May 24, 1797 – June 8, 1846) was a United States district judge of the United States District Court for the Eastern District of Pennsylvania.

== Education and career ==
Born in Philadelphia, Pennsylvania, Randall read law to enter the bar in 1818. He was in private practice in Philadelphia from 1820 to 1842. He was a clerk for the Philadelphia Select Council from 1830 to 1833. He was a Judge of the Court of Common Pleas for the First Judicial District from 1834 to 1842.

== Federal judicial service ==
On March 3, 1842, Randall was nominated by President John Tyler to a seat on the United States District Court for the Eastern District of Pennsylvania vacated by Judge Joseph Hopkinson. Randall was confirmed by the United States Senate on March 8, 1842, and received his commission the same day, serving until his death on June 8, 1846, in Philadelphia.

== Sources ==
Legal offices
Preceded by Joseph Hopkinson	Judge of the United States District Court for the Eastern District of Pennsylvania; 1842–1846	Succeeded by John K. Kane
