= Lear Green =

Enslaved woman who escaped to freedom by mailing herself in a box (c. 1839–1860)

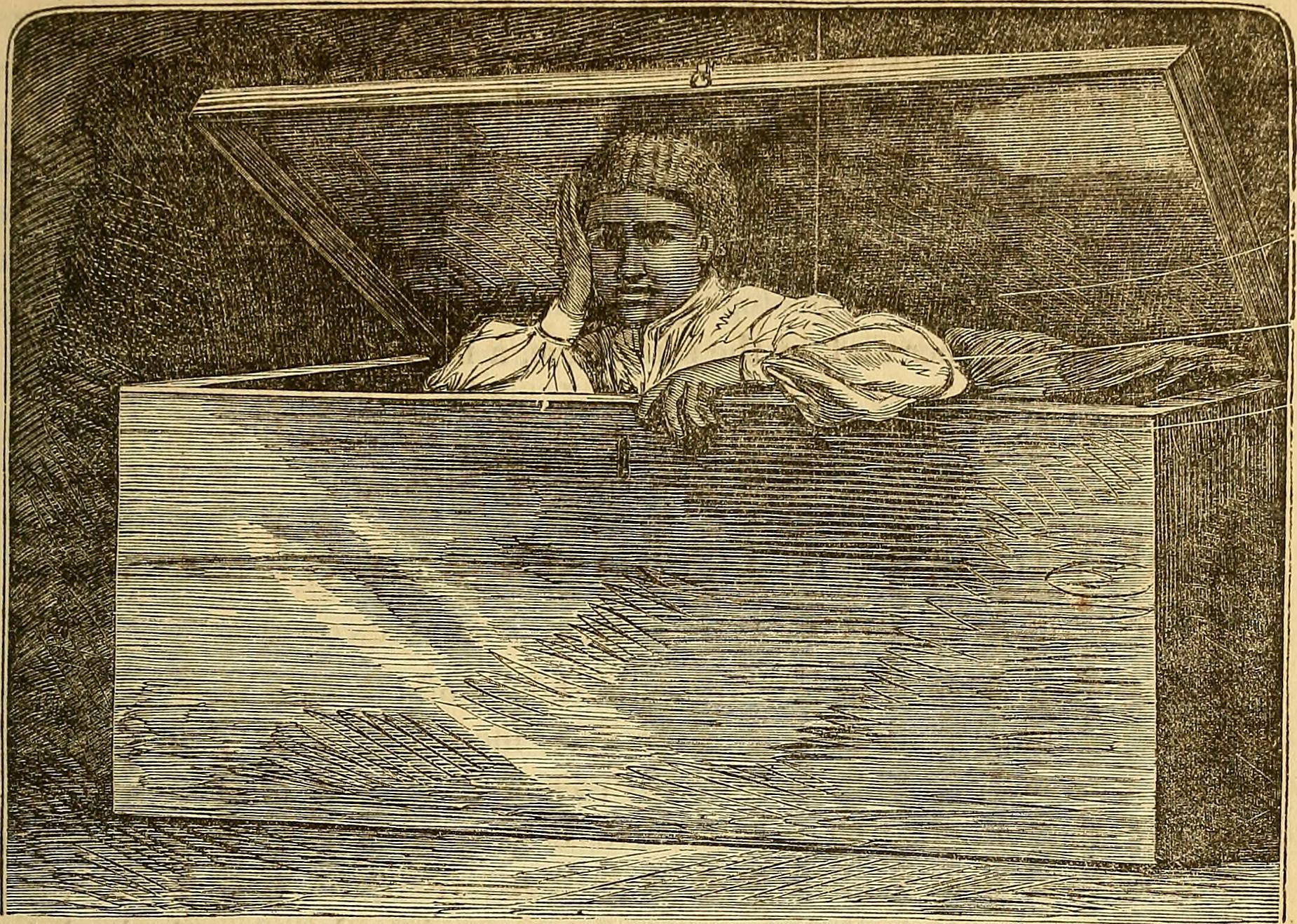
Lear Green (published in The underground rail road (1872)

Lear Green (c. 1839—1860) was an African American slave. She escaped to freedom from her slave master, James Noble, by shipping herself in an old sailor's chest from Baltimore to Philadelphia.

== Biography ==
=== Early years ===
When she was eighteen, she met a man by the name of William Adams, who asked for her hand in marriage. Adams was a free black man who worked as a barber. Lear declined the proposals at first because she refused to have children who would be born into slavery and risk Noble selling her children off. After repeated proposals, Lear accepted the proposal with the condition that she would marry Adams as a free person.

=== Escape ===
In 1857, Lear was advertised in The Sun, a Baltimore newspaper as a "NEGRO GIRL... about 18 years of age [with] black complexion, round featured, good looking and of ordinary size [wearing] a silk bonnet, a dark plaid silk dress, a light mouselin de laine, also, one watered silk cape and one tan colored cape." Noble also knew of Lear Green and William Adams's relationship and Adams's plan to marry Lear. With confidence that the two ran away together, Noble also included a description about Adams, recounting him as "black, quiet spoken, 5 by 10 inches high, a scar on one side of his face running down into a ridge by the corner of his mouth about four inches long." Noble offered $150 if Lear was "taken out of the State of Maryland and delivered to [him]; or fifty dollars if taken in the State of Maryland."

With the help of his mother, William Adams came up with a plan to smuggle Lear's freedom. Mrs. Adams, William's mother who was a free black woman, traveled to Baltimore to visit her son. After, she prepared for the trip home to New York aboard the Erricson line of steamers. With her was an old sailor's chest fastened by strong ropes containing a quilt, pillow, articles of raiment, a small amount of food, a bottle of water, and Lear Green. Despite her freedom Mrs. Adams was assigned to the deck. Fortunately for Lear, these prescribed rules existed, for Mrs. Adams was closer to the chest. About once or twice through the night during silent watches of the night, Mrs. Adams would untie the chest ropes around the claustrophobic chest, raise the lid, and give Lear a breath of fresh air while also checking on her welfare.

Eighteen hours later, they arrived in Philadelphia. Without anyone questioning the contents of the chest, it was then placed on a jolting carriage ride with Lear still confined and to the American Anti-Slavery Society Office. Upon arriving, William Still, chairman of the Vigilance Committee, untied the chest and Lear emerged from it alive. Lear remained at the Still residence until traveling to her final destination in south central New York where her fiancé was waiting.

=== Freedom ===
Eventually, Lear, now a fugitive in a free state, was forwarded to Elmira, New York where William Adams awaited her arrival. Rather than traveling to St. Catherine's, Ontario in Canada, the last stop of the underground railroad, the two decided to remain in Elmira. They were then married and enjoyed three years of freedom before Lear died of unknown causes at the age of twenty-one.
