= James Thomas Still =

American surgeon and author

- Born: James Thomas Still, Jr. July 12, 1840; Medford, New Jersey
- Died: June 22, 1895 (aged 54)
- Education: Harvard Medical School
- Years active: 1871-1895
- Known for: First black member of the Boston School Board and third black graduate of Harvard Medical School (1871)
- Parents: James Still (father); Henrietta Still (mother)
- Relatives: William Still (uncle)
- Scientific career
- Fields: Medicine

James Thomas Still (July 12, 1840 - June 22, 1895) was a surgeon and writer in Boston, Massachusetts. In 1871, he graduated with honors from Harvard Medical School, the third Black graduate of the school. In 1875, he was the first Black member elected to the Boston School Board. He maintained a private medical practice in Boston, and served in the Massachusetts Volunteer Militia. In 1895, he died from kidney failure.

== Early life ==
Still was born in Medford, New Jersey to noted physician James Still and Henrietta Still. Abolitionist William Still was his uncle. His education was in the common schools of New Jersey. Afterwards he became a teacher at Mount Holly, New Jersey. He then started work as a sutler's clerk and started studying chemistry in his own time, aiming to go to Harvard to study to become a doctor.

In 1871, he graduated with honors from Harvard Medical School. He was the third African American doctor to graduate from the school.

== Career ==
Pdf of the 1892 book The Afro American Press and its Editors by Irvine Garland Penn

After graduating from Harvard, he established a private medical practice in Boston. He served with the 2nd Battalion of the Massachusetts Volunteer Militia from 1871 to 1874.

From 1875 to 1878 he served on the Boston School Board, its first African American member.

He also served on the board of the Home for Aged Colored Women and assisted women who were former slaves and servants.

In addition to being a doctor, Still was a published writer. In 1889, his pamphlet "Don't Tell White Folks, or Light out of Darkness" was in circulation. He dedicated his publication:

To the numerous lovers of truth and of humanity — many who have lived and acted, and many who still live and act for the good of mankind — and to the many earnest aspirants and workers for true manly positions among men in their native land, yet are side-tracked and crushed universally, is this picture of serious truth dedicated, by a lover of truth.

He followed another statement in the book with his address as 82 West Cedar Street.

He died June 22, 1895, at his home in Boston of Bright's disease.

== Legacy ==
Since 2008, Harvard Medical School has hosted the annual “Howard, Dorsey, Still Lecture and Diversity Awards Ceremony” to honor the school’s first three Black graduates: Edwin C. J. T. Howard, Thomas Graham Dorsey, and Still.

== See also ==
- Samuel E. Courtney
