= John H. Wheeler =

American politician (1806–1882)

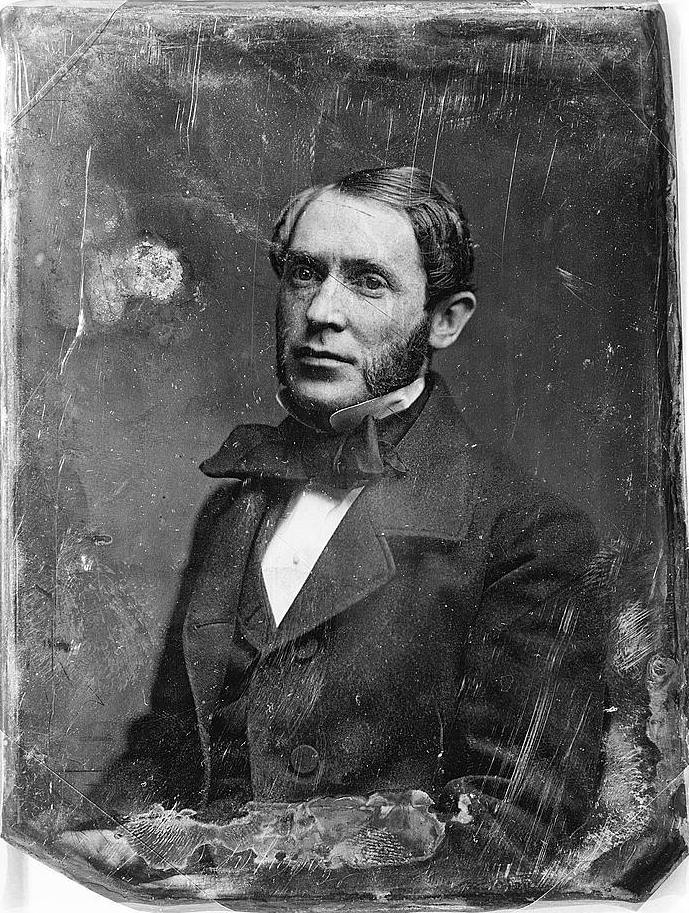
John H. Wheeler

John Hill Wheeler (1806–1882) was an American attorney, politician, historian, planter and slaveowner. He served as North Carolina State Treasurer (1843–1845), and as United States Minister to Nicaragua (1855–1856).

Wheeler gained national attention as a central figure in an 1855 legal case that tested the Fugitive Slave Act of 1850. Pennsylvania was a free state, and enslaved Jane Johnson and her two sons walked away from Wheeler in Philadelphia, while he and his family were en route to New York City and a voyage to Nicaragua. Passmore Williamson, the abolitionist who aided her in claiming her freedom, was charged with a federal crime and held indefinitely in prison. Johnson was hidden in Pennsylvania and Boston, and returned to Philadelphia to testify at trial.

Hannah Bond escaped from Wheeler's North Carolina plantation about 1857, and settled in New Jersey. She came to prominence in 2001–2002, when historian Henry Louis Gates authenticated a novel, The Life and Times of Hannah Crafts. She later legalized her pseudonym Hannah Crafts in honor of the Quaker farmer, Horace Crafts, who secreted her in his attic as Wheeler's bounty hunters were about to apprehend her. The book revealed her connection to Wheeler. Her actual name was documented in 2013.

== Early life and education ==
John Hill Wheeler was born in 1806 in Murfreesboro, North Carolina, where his family were planters. His birthplace, the John Wheeler House, is included in the Murfreesboro Historic District on the National Register of Historic Places. Wheeler earned a bachelor's degree at Columbian College (now George Washington University). He read law under John Louis Taylor and was admitted to the bar in 1827. The following year he continued his studies and received a master's degree from the University of North Carolina at Chapel Hill.

== Personal life and political career ==
Wheeler was first elected to the North Carolina House of Commons in 1827, from Hertford County at age 21, and served four years. Years later he was elected to the House again, but from Lincoln County. He gained a patronage position under President Andrew Jackson, who appointed Wheeler as superintendent of the federal mint in Charlotte, North Carolina (1837–1841).

Wheeler married his first wife, the well educated and literary Mary Elizabeth Brown, in 1830. They had one daughter. In 1838 he married Ellen Oldmixon Sully, daughter of the painter Thomas Sully, and, they had two sons. During the Civil war one son, Levi Woodbury Wheeler, was to serve in the Confederate army and another, Charles Sully Wheeler, in the US Navy.

In 1842, Wheeler was elected state treasurer by the North Carolina General Assembly, but he was defeated for re-election in 1844.

Wheeler moved to Washington, DC about 1853 to be more active in national politics. President Franklin Pierce appointed him as an assistant secretary in 1854. Shortly thereafter Wheeler was appointed as US Minister to Nicaragua. There, he officially recognized the government of William Walker, an American adventurer who had invaded the country with a small force, intending to take it over.

After returning to North Carolina, Wheeler served in a variety of minor federal government patronage posts.

== Literary interests ==
Wheeler read widely and had a large library in his plantation house, containing works by prominent English writers, such as Jane Austen, Charles Dickens, Charlotte Brontë, and others. His library has been studied in the 21st century for evidence of what a literate slave might have read there. Hannah Bond, documented as a woman who escaped from his plantation to the North about 1857, later wrote a novel that included many quotes from these authors. After the manuscript was found in the early 21st century and authenticated, her work was published for the first time in 2002; it is believed to be the first novel by an African-American woman.

Henry Louis Gates Jr., a professor of African-American literature and history, who studied the 1882 catalog of Wheeler's library, has written that he was surprised to find it included many slave narratives, in addition to works by the 18th-century African-born poet Phillis Wheatley and abolitionist Frederick Douglass, an escaped slave.

It turns out that Wheeler's library included a large section of works devoted to slavery, including works by fugitive slaves themselves. Few libraries in the United States before 1860 would have included more works by African-American authors than Wheeler's. A partial listing includes Wheatley's Memoir and Poems; Martin R. Delany's Official Report of the Niger River Valley Exploring Party; The Life of Noah Davis, a Colored Man; The Refugee, or Narrative of Fugitive Slaves in Canada; Narrative of the Suffering of Lewis and Milton Clarke; Austin Steward's Twenty-Two Years a Slave, and Forty Years a Freeman; The Life of John Thompson, a Fugitive Slave; Douglass's My Bondage and My Freedom and Narrative of a Life.

Gates adds that Wheeler had Harriet Beecher Stowe's bestseller, Uncle Tom's Cabin. That might be expected, given its notoriety and status as a bestseller. Gates writes that:

In addition, Wheeler's library contained several significant abolitionist texts by white authors, like Scenes in the Life of Harriet Tubman and Lydia Maria Child's Freedman's Book, alongside racist texts like Negrophobia 'On the Brain' in White Men, by J. R. Hayes, and John Campbell's Negromania, the Falsely Assumed Equality of the Various Races of Man. (As we might expect, Wheeler's library contained a much larger section of these sorts of books than antislavery ones.) It was as if he read the works of fugitive slaves to study the mind of the enemy, perhaps better to master and control his slaves, and to prevent them from escaping.

In his own work, Wheeler wrote or edited several books on North Carolina state history and its prominent European-American men, which are listed below.

== Works ==
- Historical Sketches of North Carolina, from 1584 to 1851
- The Narrative of Colonel David Fanning
- Legislative Manual and Political Register of the State of North Carolina for the Year 1874
- Wheeler, John Hill (1884). Reminiscences and Memoirs of North Carolina and Eminent North Carolinians. Columbus Printing Works, Columbus, Ohio. p. 300., published posthumously

== Slave challenges ==
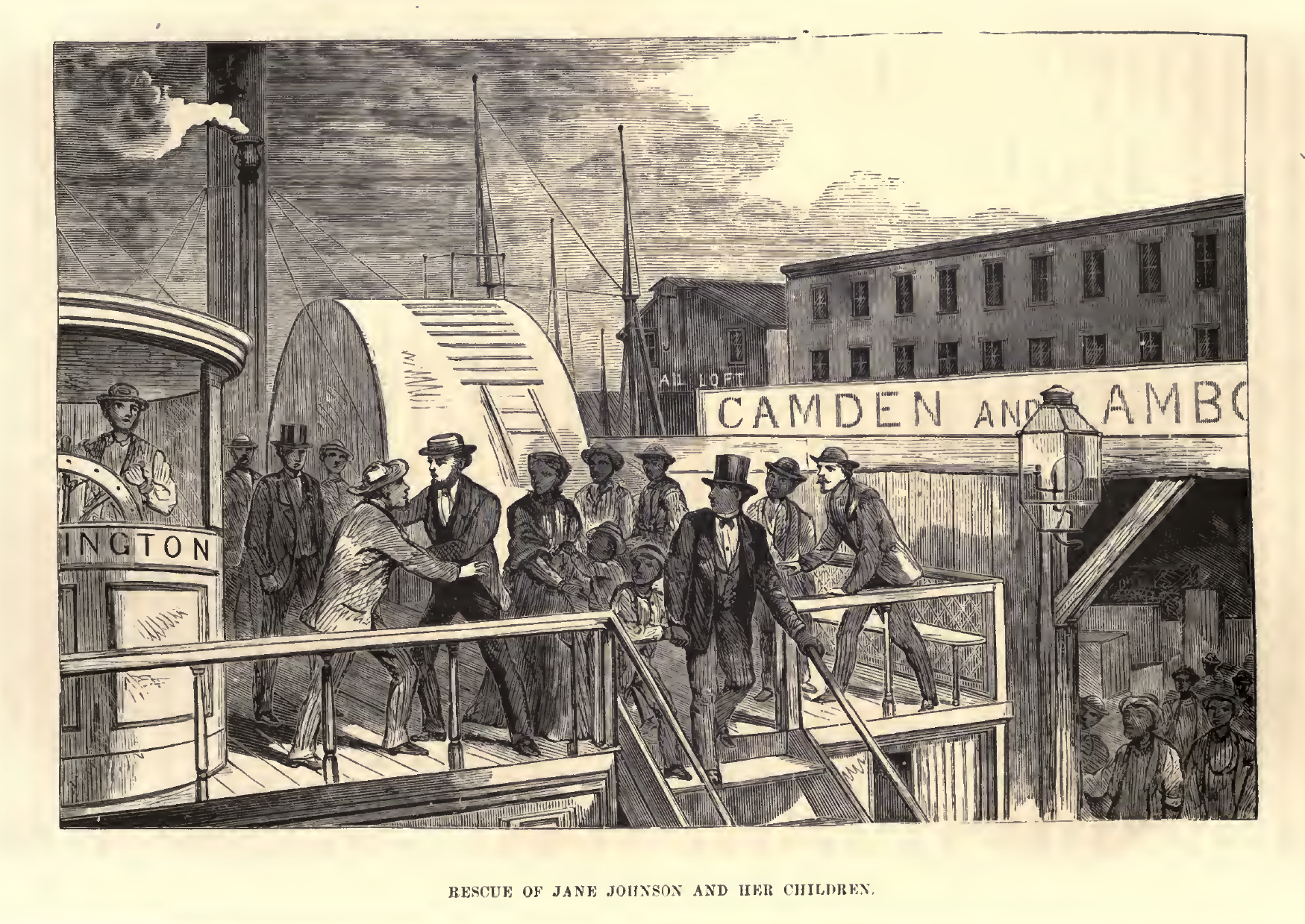
"Rescue of Jane Johnson and her children, July 18, 1855." Illustration from William Still, The Underground Railroad (1872).

Wheeler had at least two slaves evade his control and gain freedom: Jane Johnson escaped with her two sons in July 1855, while traveling with Wheeler and his family in Philadelphia, en route to Nicaragua. He was taking her to serve his family while he was posted as US Minister to Nicaragua. Pennsylvania was a free state; if masters voluntarily brought slaves to the state, its law considered them to be free. The Vigilance Committee of the Pennsylvania Anti-Slavery Society acted to advise slaves of their rights and assist them to freedom.

Johnson got word to local members of the Vigilance Committee that she wanted to leave her master. They contacted her and Wheeler on the ship before their departure. Johnson and her children quickly left with William Still, chairman of the committee, and were hidden. At the time, one of Wheeler's home state papers, the Fayetteville Observer, wrote: "No man who carries his Negroes into a Free State is deserving of any sympathy in his loss. He invites it, with an assurance that the invitation will be accepted." The case attracted national attention after white abolitionist Passmore Williamson, an officer of the Society, was jailed for contempt of court for refusing to tell where Johnson was hidden. He did not know, as the Committee kept such information secret.

The next month, local and state officials protected Johnson after she testified in court against Wheeler in his prosecution of assault charges of six African-American men who had aided Johnson to leave him. (Four, including William Still, were acquitted and two had charges reduced and minor sentences.) Johnson moved to Boston, and she and her sons lived free.

Hannah Bond, a literate slave who served Wheeler's wife Ellen as a lady's maid, escaped about 1857 from their North Carolina plantation in Lincoln County. She reached New York State and settled in New Jersey. She wrote The Bondwoman's Narrative, under the pseudonym of Hannah Crafts. The manuscript was rediscovered in 2001 and published for the first time in 2002; it is believed to be the first novel by an African-American woman, and certainly the first by a fugitive slave woman. Her references in her novel to the Wheeler family, and to Jane Johnson's gaining freedom in Philadelphia, provided details that helped historians establish Bond's identity. Published under her pseudonym of Hannah Crafts, the novel became a bestseller.

== See also ==
- Jane Johnson (slave)
- William Still
- Passmore Williamson

Political offices
Preceded by Charles L. Hinton	North Carolina State Treasurer; 1843–1845	Succeeded by Charles L. Hinton
Diplomatic posts
Preceded by Solon Borland	United States Minister to Nicaragua; April 7, 1855 – October 23, 1856	Succeeded by Mirabeau B. Lamar
