= Charles Woodruff Shields =

American theologian

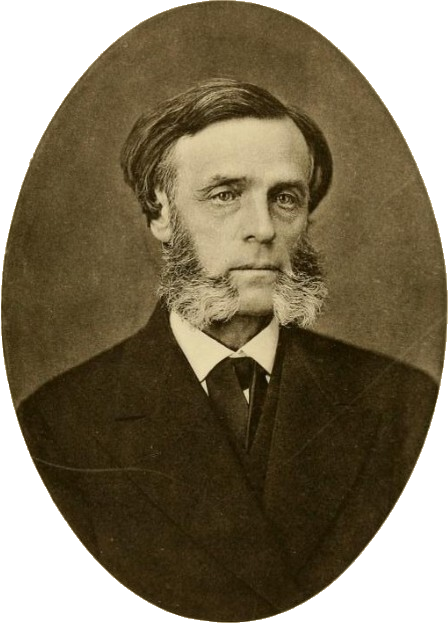
- Born: April 4, 1825; New Albany, Indiana, US
- Died: August 26, 1904 (aged 79); Newport, Rhode Island, US
- Education: College of New Jersey; Princeton Theological Seminary
- Occupation: Theologian
- Spouses: Charlotte Elizabeth Bain (m. 1848) Elizabeth Kane (m. 1861)

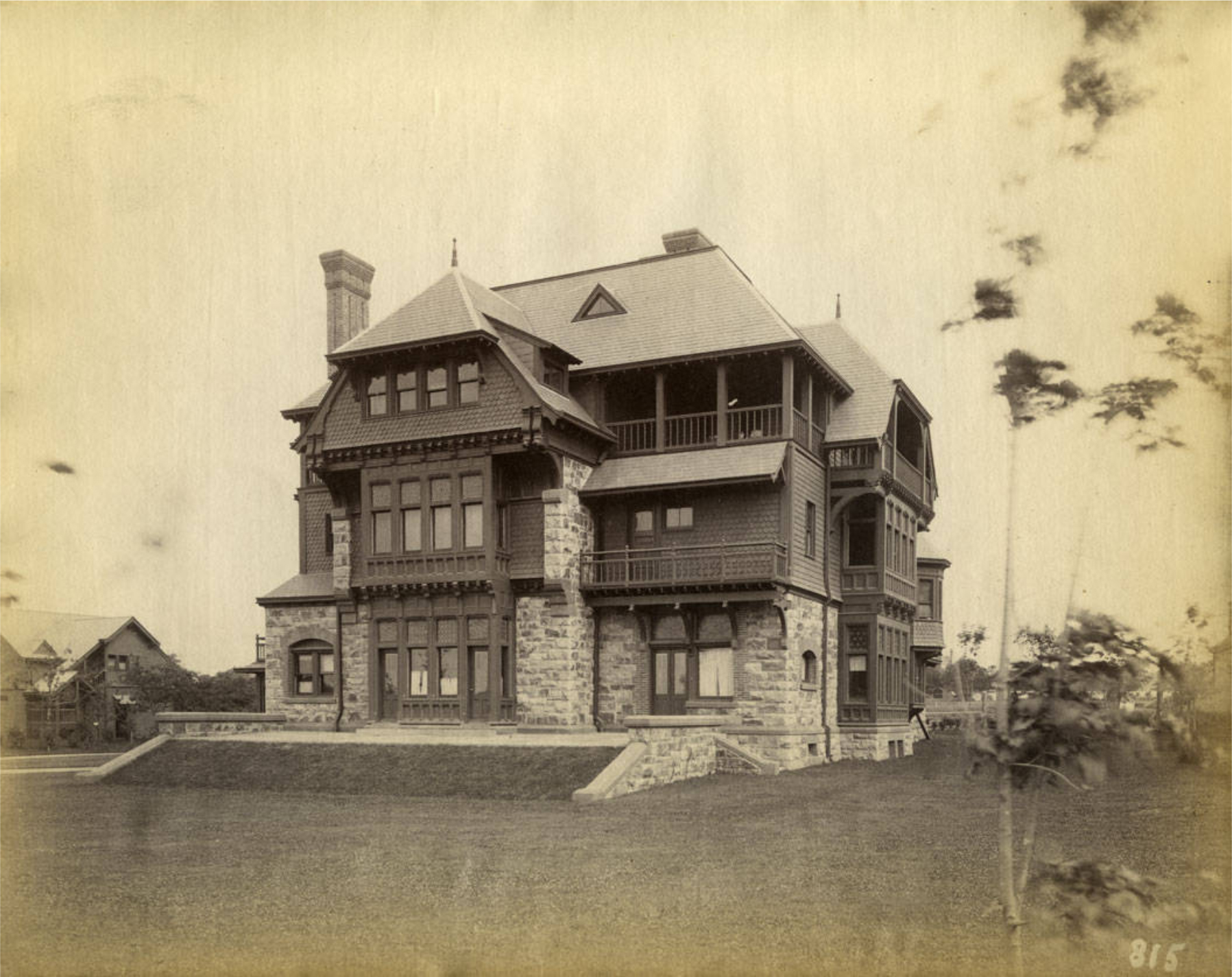
Woodruff's residence Nethercliffe in Newport, Rhode Island

Charles Woodruff Shields (April 4, 1825 – August 26, 1904) was an American theologian.

== Biography ==
Charles Woodruff Shields was born in New Albany, Indiana, on April 4, 1825. He graduated from the College of New Jersey (later Princeton) in 1844 and at Princeton Theological Seminary in 1847.

He married Charlotte Elizabeth Bain on November 22, 1848, and remarried to Elizabeth Kane on April 25, 1861.

After holding two pastorates he returned (1866) to Princeton College to take up the position of professor of the harmony of science and revealed religion, which had been established for him. In 1898 he took orders in the Episcopal church, but retained his chair until his death.

In 1861 he produced an essay entitled Philosophia Ultima. This was in effect a manifesto for a grand unity of academic disciplines, setting forth a scheme of scholarship which should fully reconcile science and Christian religion, which he considered the academic culture of the United States uniquely qualified to advance.

In 1877, he was elected as a member of the American Philosophical Society.

His studies at Princeton resulted in the expansion of this essay into The Final Philosophy, or system of perfectible knowledge issuing from the harmony of science and religion (1877), and eventually in Philosophia Ultima (three volumes, 1888–1905), with a memoir by William Milligan Sloane.

He also published:

- The Book of Common Prayer as Amended by the Presbyterian Divines of 1661 (1864; second edition, 1883)
- The Order of the Sciences (1882)
- The Scientific Evidences of Revealed Religion (1900), Paddock lectures.

He died from heart disease in Newport, Rhode Island, on August 26, 1904.
