= William Still =

American abolitionist, writer, businessman

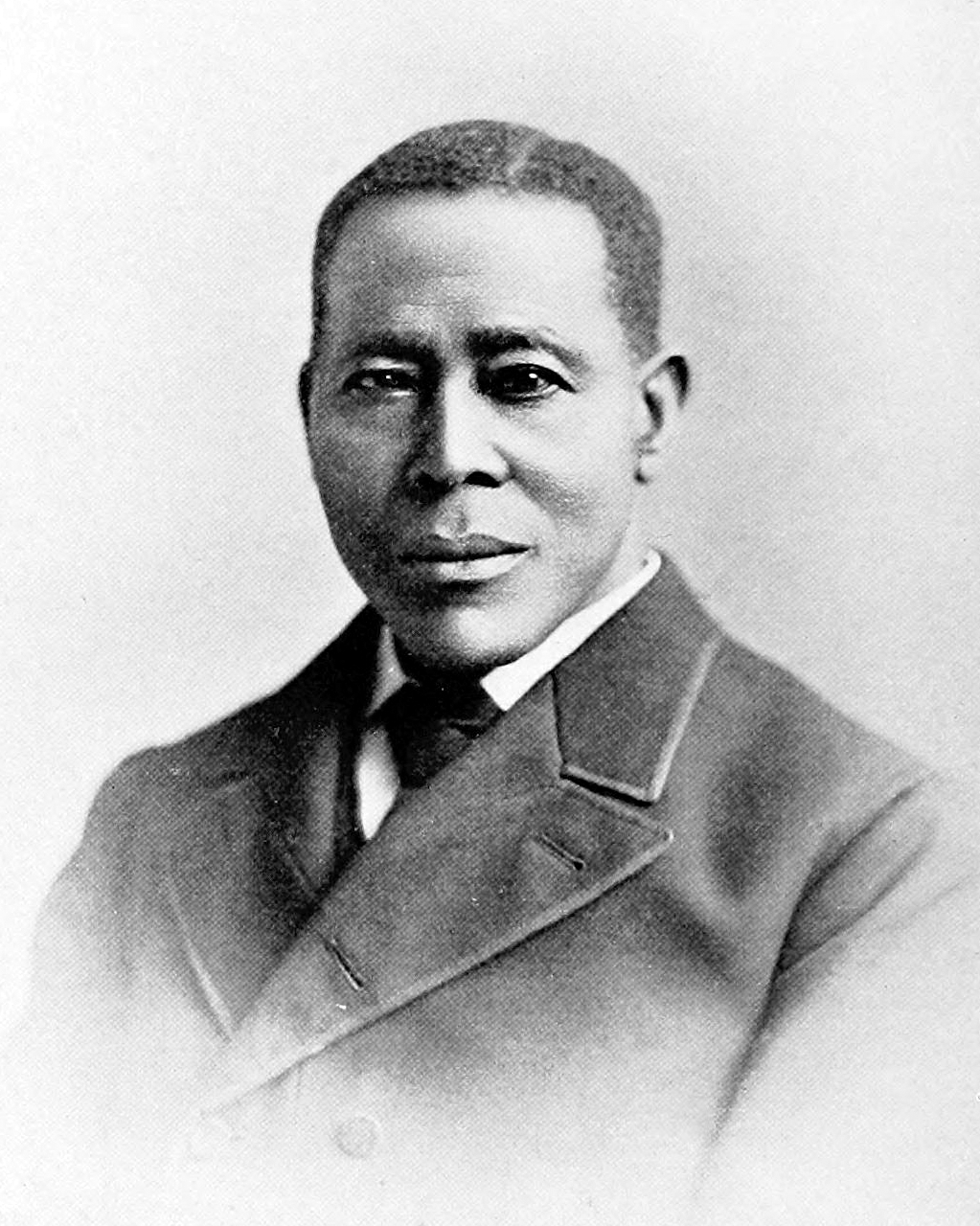
- Image of Still, published in 1898
- Born: October 7, 1821; Shamong Township, New Jersey, U.S.
- Died: July 14, 1902 (aged 80); Philadelphia, Pennsylvania, U.S.
- Resting place: Eden Cemetery (Collingdale, Pennsylvania)
- Occupations: Abolitionist; businessman; philanthropist
- Known for: Working for the Pennsylvania Anti-Slavery Society; Writing The Underground Railroad Records
- Spouse: Letitia George (m. 1847)
- Children: 4

William Still (October 7, 1821 – July 14, 1902) was an African-American abolitionist based in Philadelphia, Pennsylvania. He was a conductor of the Underground Railroad and was responsible for aiding and assisting at least 649 slaves to freedom. Still was also a businessman, writer, historian and civil rights activist. Before the American Civil War, Still was chairman of the Vigilance Committee of the Pennsylvania Anti-Slavery Society, named the Vigilant Association of Philadelphia. He directly aided fugitive slaves and also kept records of the people served in order to help families reunite.

After the war, Still continued as a prominent businessman, a coal merchant, and philanthropist. He used his meticulous records to write an account of the underground system and the experiences of many escaped slaves, entitled The Underground Railroad Records (1872).

== Household ==
William Still was born in Shamong Township, Burlington County, New Jersey, to former slaves Charity (formerly named Sidney) and Levin Still. He was the youngest of eighteen children. His parents had migrated separately to New Jersey. First, his father had bought his freedom in 1798 from his master in Caroline County, Maryland, on the Eastern Shore and moved north to New Jersey. Levin stayed around in Maryland until 1805 in order to keep watch on his wife and children. After arriving in Evesham Township, they became friends with families named “Still” and assumed the last name in order to hide Charity’s fugitive status.

His mother, Charity, escaped twice from Maryland. The first time, she and four children were all recaptured and returned to slavery. A few months later, Charity escaped again, taking only her two younger daughters with her, and reached her husband in New Jersey. Following her escape, Charity and Levin had 14 more children, of whom William was the youngest. Though these children were born in the free state of New Jersey, under Maryland and federal slave law, they were still legally slaves, as their mother was an escaped slave. According to New Jersey law, however, they were free. They settled in the Pine Barrens of New Jersey a small township named Shamong Township.

Neither Charity nor Levin could free their two older boys, who remained enslaved in Maryland. Levin, Jr., and Peter Still were sold from Maryland to slave owners in Lexington, Kentucky. Later they were resold to planters in Alabama in the Deep South. Levin, Jr., died from a whipping while enslaved. Peter, his wife "Vina", and most of his family escaped from slavery when he was about age 50, with the help of two brothers named Friedman, who operated mercantile establishments in Florence, Alabama, and Cincinnati, Ohio. They were the subject of a book published in 1856.

Later Peter Still sought help at the Pennsylvania Anti-Slavery Society, seeking to find his parents or other members of his birth family. He met William Still there, but initially had no idea they were related. As William listened to Peter's story, he recognized the history his mother had told him many times. After learning that his older brother Levin was whipped to death for visiting his wife without permission, William shouted, "What if I told you I was your brother!" Later Peter and his mother were reunited after having been separated for 42 years.

Another of William's brothers was James Still. Born in New Jersey in 1812, James wanted to become a doctor but said he "was not the right color to enter where such knowledge was dispensed." James studied herbs and plants and apprenticed himself to a white doctor to learn medicine. He became known as the "Black Doctor of the Pines", as he lived and practiced in the Medford Township, New Jersey. James's son, James Thomas Still, was the third African-American to graduate from Harvard Medical School in 1871.

William's other siblings included Levin, Jr.; Peter; James; Samuel; Mary, a teacher and missionary in the African Methodist Episcopal Church; Mahala (who married Gabriel Thompson); and Kitturah, who moved to Pennsylvania.

== Marriage and children ==
In 1844, William Still moved from New Jersey to Philadelphia, Pennsylvania. In 1847, the same year he was hired as a clerk for the Pennsylvania Society for the Abolition of Slavery, Still married Letitia George. They had four children who survived infancy. Their oldest was Caroline Virginia Matilda Still, one of the first Black women to become a physician in the United States. Caroline attended Oberlin College and the Women's Medical College of Philadelphia (much later known as the Medical College of Pennsylvania). She married Edward J. Wiley. After he died, she married again, to the Reverend Matthew Anderson, longtime pastor of the Berean Presbyterian Church in North Philadelphia. She had an extensive private medical practice in Philadelphia and was also a community activist, teacher and leader.

William Wilberforce Still (1854–1932) graduated from Lincoln University and subsequently practiced law in Philadelphia. Robert George Still (1861–1896) became a journalist and owned a print shop on Pine at 11th Street in central Philadelphia. Frances Ellen Still (1857–1943) became a kindergarten teacher (she was named after poet Frances Ellen Watkins Harper, who had lived with the Stills before her marriage). According to the 1900 U.S. Census, William W., his wife, and Frances Ellen all lived in the same household as the elderly William Still and his wife, confirming the custom of extended families living together.

== Activism ==
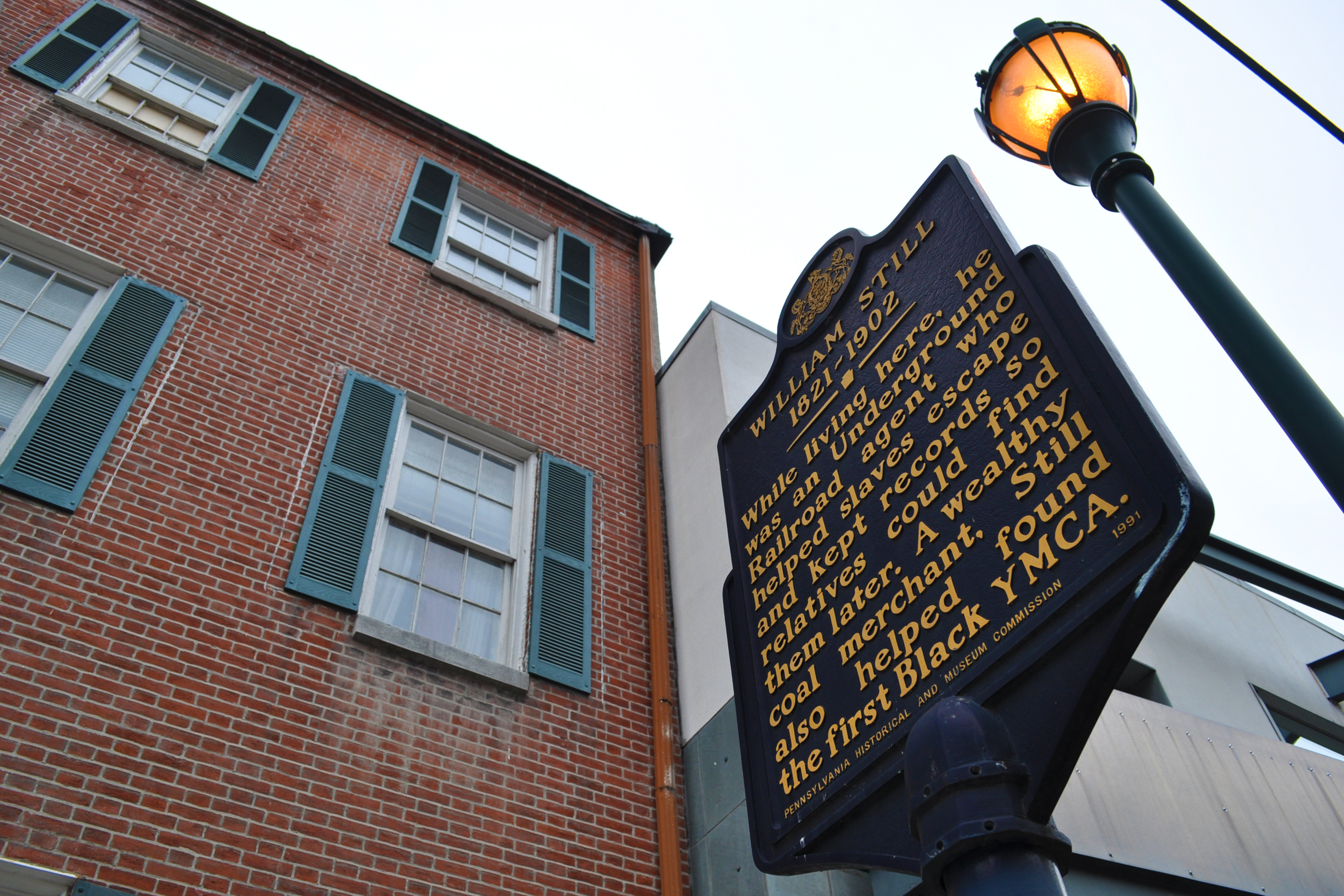
A historical marker outside Still's residence in Philadelphia

=== Abolitionism ===
In 1847, three years after settling in Philadelphia, Still began working as a clerk for the Pennsylvania Anti-Slavery Society. When Philadelphia abolitionists organized a Vigilance Committee to directly aid escaped slaves who had reached the city, Still became its chairman. This led him and his wife Letitia to move to a relatively new rowhouse on the east side of Ronaldson Street between South and Bainbridge Streets, which still stands today at 625 S. Delhi Street. The Stills occupied this house, which was an Underground Railroad Way Station, from 1850 through 1855. It was here where Stills untied the box that carried Lear Green on her escape from Maryland in a steamer chest. Through his status as chairman of the Vigilance Committee, Still was one of the leaders of Philadelphia's African-American community.

In 1855, he participated in the nationally covered rescue of Jane Johnson, a slave who sought help from the Society in gaining freedom while passing through Philadelphia with her master John Hill Wheeler, newly appointed US Minister to Nicaragua. Still and others liberated her and her two sons under Pennsylvania law, which held that slaves brought to the free state voluntarily by a slaveholder could choose freedom. Her master sued him and five other African-Americans for assault and kidnapping in a high-profile case in August 1855. Jane Johnson returned to Philadelphia from New York and testified in court as to her independence in choosing freedom, winning an acquittal for Still and four others, and reduced sentences for the last two men.

In 1859, Still challenged the segregation of the city's public transit system, which had separate seating for whites and blacks. He kept lobbying and, in 1865, the Pennsylvania legislature passed a law to integrate streetcars across the state.

=== Underground Railroad ===
In his obituary, The New York Times proclaimed Still "The Father of the Underground Railroad." William Still helped as many as 800 slaves escape to freedom. He interviewed each person and kept careful records, including a brief biography and the destination for each, along with any alias adopted. He kept his records carefully hidden but knew the accounts would be critical in aiding the future reunion of family members who became separated under slavery, which he had learned when he aided his own brother Peter, whom he had never met before.

Still worked with other Underground Railroad agents operating in the South, including in Virginia ports, nearby Delaware and Maryland, and in many counties in southern Pennsylvania. His network to freedom also included agents in New Jersey, New York, New England and Canada. William Still provided material support and encouragement for Harriet Tubman to begin her work as a conductor of the Underground Railroad. She traveled through his office with fellow passengers on several occasions during the 1850s. Still also forged a connection with the family of John Brown, and sheltered several of Brown's associates fleeing the 1859 raid on Harpers Ferry.

=== American Civil War and aftermath ===
During the American Civil War, Still operated the post exchange at Camp William Penn, the training camp for United States Colored Troops north of Philadelphia. He also opened a stove store and in 1861 bought a coal yard and operated a coal delivery business, which he continued to operate after the war.

In 1867, Still published A Brief Narrative of the Struggle for the Rights of Colored People of Philadelphia in the City Railway Cars.

In 1872, Still published an account of the Underground Railroad, The Underground Railroad Records, based on the carefully recorded secret notes he had kept in diaries during those years. His book includes his impressions of station masters such as Thomas Garrett, Daniel Gibbons and Abigail Goodwin. It went through three editions and in 1876 was displayed at the Philadelphia Centennial Exhibition. Historians have since used it to understand how the Underground Railroad worked; both Project Gutenberg and the Internet archive make the text freely available.In addition to all the other things William grew a strong devotion to help save enslaved people.

=== Business and philanthropy ===
After the war, Still continued as an active businessman, philanthropist and social activist in the Philadelphia metropolitan areas.

In addition to the ongoing coal business, Still owned considerable real estate, including Liberty Hall, for some time the largest public hall in the U.S. owned by a black man. He also owned stock in the journal the Nation, was a member of Philadelphia's Board of Trade, and financed and was officer of the Social and Civil Statistical Association of Philadelphia (which in part tracked freed people).

Still also remained active in the Colored Conventions Movement, having attended national conventions including the New England Colored Citizens' Convention of 1859, where he advocated for equal educational opportunities for all African Americans. He also advocated for temperance which motivated him to organize a mission Sabbath School for the Presbyterian Church. He was a member of the Freedmen's Aid Union and Commission, an officer of the Philadelphia Home for the Aged and Infirm Colored Persons, and an elder in the Presbyterian church (where he established Sabbath Schools to promote literacy including among freed blacks).

He had a strong interest in the welfare of black youth. He helped to establish an orphanage and the first YMCA for African Americans in Philadelphia. In addition to continuing as member of the board for the Soldiers and Sailors Orphan Home and the Home for the Destitute Colored Children, Still became a trustable person at Storer College.

== Death, legacy and honors ==
Still died July 14, 1902, at his home on 726 South 19th Street in Philadelphia. He was buried in Eden Cemetery in Collingdale, Delaware County, Pennsylvania, as would later be his wife and daughter. Founded just a month before Still's death, Eden Cemetery is now the nation's oldest African-American owned cemetery, and on the National Register of Historic Places since 2010. In March 2018, Still's residence of 1850–1855 was identified and placed on the Philadelphia Register of Historic Places.

=== Descendants ===
Family members donated his papers, including personal papers 1865–1899, to the Charles L. Blockson Afro-American Collection at Temple University Library, where they remain accessible to researchers.

Peter lived (b. 1801- d.1868) in Burlington Township, New Jersey. Dr. James (b.1812- d. 1882) resided in Medford, New Jersey. Dr. James Still's descendants include the WNBA basketball player Valerie Still and her brother, NFL defensive end Art Still, and Devon Still, former NFL defensive end with the Houston Texans. It has been assumed for many years that all the Still family members were blood related but through research and DNA testing there are definitely different progeny of the Still family.

=== National Underground Railroad Network ===
In 1997, Congress passed H.R. 1635, which President Bill Clinton signed into law, and which authorized the United States National Park Service to establish the National Underground Railroad Network to Freedom program to identify associated sites and popularize the Underground Railroad. This also affirmed Still's national importance as a leading Underground Railroad agent in a major center of abolition.

=== In popular culture ===
- Actor Robert Hooks portrayed Still in A Woman Called Moses, the 1978 miniseries that is based upon the life of abolitionist Harriet Tubman.
- Actor Ron O'Neal portrayed a fictional version of Still in the 1985 miniseries, North and South.
- Stand by the River (2003), a musical based on Still's life and rescue of Jane Johnson, was written and composed by Joanne and Mark Sutton-Smith. It has been produced in New York and Chicago, and at universities and other venues across the country.
- Actor Chris Chalk portrayed a fictional version of Still on the WGN America period drama TV series, Underground.
- Underground Railroad: the William Still Story is an independent film documentary first shown on the Public Broadcasting System on February 6, 2012.
- Nkeiru Okoye wrote the opera Harriet Tubman: When I Crossed that Line to Freedom which includes Still as a character. It was first performed in 2014.
- Actor Leslie Odom Jr. portrayed Still in the 2019 film Harriet, based on the life of Harriet Tubman.
- A fictional version of William Still is portrayed by Ta-Nehisi Coates in his novel The Water Dancer (2019), in which Still is represented by the character Raymond White.
- Composer Paul Moravec and librettist Mark Campbell composed an oratorio Sanctuary Road based on the writings of William Still. The oratorio premiered at Carnegie Hall in May, 2018. An opera version of Sanctuary Road premiered in Raleigh, North Carolina, in March 2022. A recording is available. A video of the opera can be viewed here.

== See also ==
- List of African-American abolitionists
- Slave narrative
- Anna Maria Weems
