= James Still (doctor) =

19th Century African-American Physician

Dr. James Still
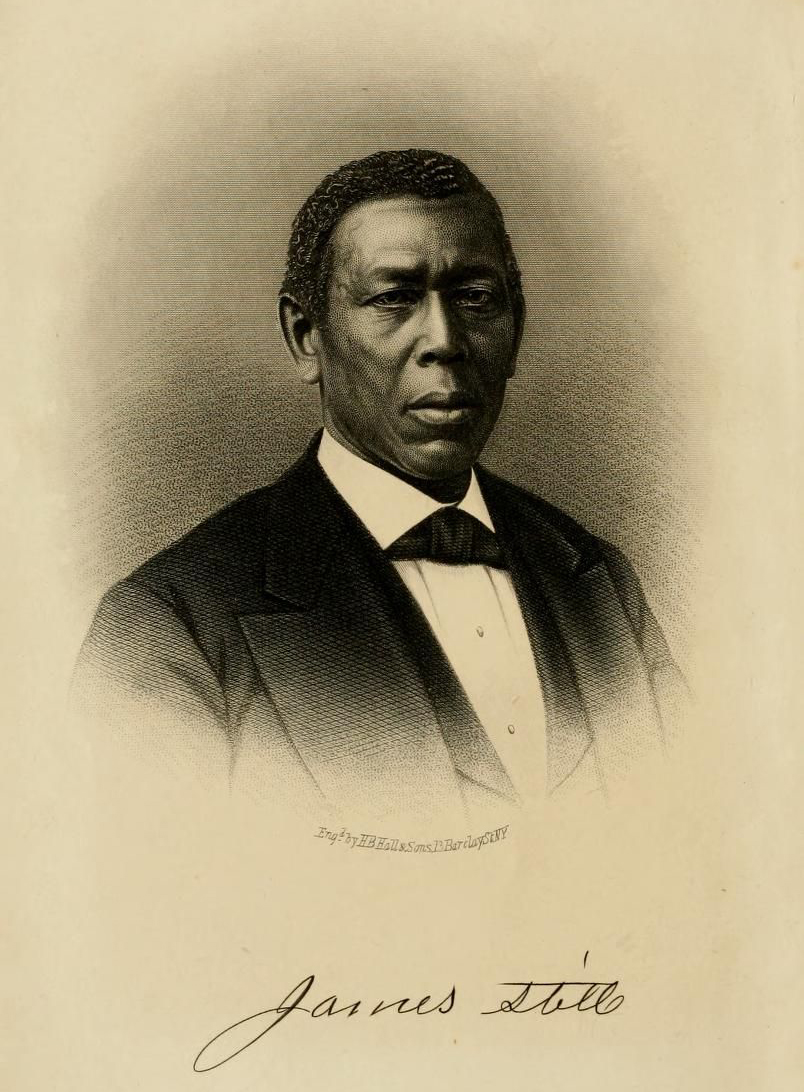
- Engraved portrait of Dr. James Still
- Born: April 9, 1812; Washington Township, Burlington County, New Jersey, U.S.
- Died: March 9, 1882 (aged 69); Medford, New Jersey, U.S.
- Occupations: Physician, herbalist, author
- Years active: 1843–1882
- Known for: Self-taught country doctor
- Notable work: Early Recollections and Life of Dr. James Still

James Still (April 9, 1812 – March 9, 1882) was an African-American medical doctor, herbalist, and author. He was known as "The Black Doctor of the Pines", referring to the New Jersey Pine Barrens region. His parents were slaves and he was born into poverty, yet with a minimum of formal education and much hard work and self-education, Still became a successful and much-respected doctor in the southern New Jersey and Philadelphia areas. He chronicled his life in an autobiography, Early Recollections and Life of Dr. James Still, printed by J.B. Lippincott and Co. in 1877.

== Early life ==
Still was one of 18 children of Levin and Sidney Steel, who were born into slavery in Maryland. Levin purchased his freedom in 1798 and relocated to New Jersey. Sidney escaped from bondage around 1805 and was reunited with Levin. To avoid capture, Sidney's name was changed to Charity, and the family name was modified to Still.

James Still was born in 1812 in Washington Township, Burlington County, New Jersey (now called Shamong Township, New Jersey). Still's parents were religious, and their spiritual guidance remained with Still his entire life. "My mother was a stanch Methodist," he wrote, "but my father was not, although a great reader of the Scriptures and a believer in them." Because of prevailing racial restrictions of the era, and because his physical labor was necessary to help his impoverished family survive, Still spent little time attending school. During his early teens, he was hired out to local residents as a day laborer, "chopping wood, making charcoal, picking berries and 'grubbing'—digging up roots and trees to clear land."

At the age of 21, he went to work for a glue factory in Philadelphia owned by Charles Cummings; Still's pay was ten dollars per month plus board. He was such a diligent employee that Cummings gave him periodic wage increases as well as greater responsibilities in the factory.

== Medical practice ==
When he was around three years of age, Still and his siblings were vaccinated by a local doctor. "From that moment," he later wrote, "I was inspired with a desire to become a doctor. It took deep root in me, so deep that all the drought or poverty or lack of education could not destroy the desire." However, as an African-American, he was refused admittance to medical school. As he matured, Still studied the healing powers of herbs and plants, and developed medical practices based on his own observations. In some areas, such as the treatment of burns and syphilis (then treated with mercury), he was more progressive than his formally-trained colleagues.

Still married Angelina Willow in 1836, and they had a daughter, Beulah, born that same year. For $100, Still purchased a plot of brush land near the town of Cross-Roads. Angelina died of tuberculosis in August 1838. One year later, Still married Henrietta Thomas of Vincentown. Three days after their marriage, Still's daughter Beulah died. James and Henrietta eventually had seven children of their own.

In 1843, Still purchased a distilling device from William Jones of Mt. Holly, and from Jones learned the process of extracting oils from roots and herbs, particularly sassafras and peppermint. He began earning a modest income by regularly selling his homemade oils, tinctures, and essences to Philadelphia druggists Charles and William Ellis.

On one trip to Philadelphia, Still purchased a book on medical botany from Dr. Thomas Cook. He became so fascinated by the subject that he returned to Dr. Cook's shop two weeks later to purchase a second volume, which he said gave "instructions for making pills, powders, tinctures, salves, and liniments." Thereafter Still "began practicing medicine somewhat by accident, agreeing to treat a sick man in exchange for some sassafras. Slowly, he found that he was distilling less and healing more. About 1845, Dr. Still stopped distilling and focused entirely on his medical practice."

Still's popularity and effectiveness as a self-educated physician aroused the envy and resentment of many formally educated medical practitioners. "They laughed," wrote New Jersey historian Henry Charlton Beck, "as [Still] went along in his rough [carriage], a cigar-box his medicine chest. Then they laughed no longer but took measures to have his business stopped. He was practicing, they said, without a license. But [Still] had been careful, accepting only what people thought they ought to give him. There had been no fixed rates. Just the same these other doctors said they had grounds for a protest. Still consulted an attorney and found he could circumvent the law by charging merely for 'delivery of medicine'."

Still disdained many then-popular medical treatments, including the use of mercury and calomel. He exclusively used preparations made from roots, herbs, and vegetables. "It seems to me that vegetable medicine is all that is needed for the restoration of health," he wrote, "the voice of the medical faculty to the contrary notwithstanding." His various remedies (internal and external), as chronicled in his book, included soda water, lye, catnip tea, vinegar, salts, ipecac, saffron, camphor, Virginia snakeroot, opium, bloodroot, cream of tartar, cloves, comfrey root, horehound tops, skunk cabbage, jalap root, tincture of lobelia, and more.

Still lived a frugal life, and saved his earnings. He did not drink, gamble, or carouse, and discouraged these behaviors in others. With his money he continued to buy available properties in Medford, New Jersey, and eventually became a substantial landholder. Yet he was critical of those who pursued financial prosperity at the expense of their physical well-being:

It has often seemed strange to me that persons will study interests in lands, stocks, financial and commercial; study how to accumulate wealth, how to make good bargains in their own favor, and how to prevent themselves from being imposed upon, and yet neglect the study of health and longevity, two of the most important things in an earthly career. Health is a greater boon than riches, surpassing every earthly blessing.

Beck recounts that in Still's book, the doctor "remembers collecting many curious and freak animals. He took an uncommon interest in children and their sicknesses, curing a great many, never permitting any employee to prepare their medicines. He had little time for a man who would not pay his debts."

== Later life ==
Still continued his practice into his 60s, despite advancing age and declining health. In 1872, he found himself "much broken down by being overtasked with business, and concluded to give up my outside practice and continue only that which came to my office, hoping to regain my former health." In August of that year, Still and his wife vacationed for four days in Long Branch, New Jersey. He returned feeling "much better." As soon as he was dropped off at home, he said that "five or six persons joined me to go up to the office for medical attendance. When I reached the house I found my office full, waiting my return." This demoralized Still, as he realized that community demands would not allow him to reduce his workload. "I continued as best I could with my office work," he wrote, "suffering continually from great prostration. This physical condition continued for more than a year." He became too ill to see many patients, and even "felt [his] own departure to be near." However, he eventually recovered and once again expressed a desire to cut back office hours. "In this I was disappointed," he wrote. "As soon as it was known that I was about again I was fairly besieged with patients."

Still published his 274-page autobiography in 1877. In addition to his life chronicle, the book contains moral instruction, recipes for "treating fevers and many other maladies," political opinions, family vignettes, and a travelogue of his visit to New Jersey's 1876 Centennial Exposition.

Still felt compelled to offer encouragement by example to members of his recently emancipated but historically disadvantaged race. In his book's introduction, Still wrote:

I hope this book may be a stimulus to some poor, dejected fellow-man, who, almost hopelessly, sits down and folds his arms and says, "I know nothing, and can do nothing." Let me say to you, Study nature and its laws, the source from which these mighty truths are drawn. Great minds are not made in schools. I am speaking to men whose pecuniary circumstances are such as to prevent them from being partakers of these blissful privileges.

Still died of a stroke in 1882. He is buried in Colemantown Cemetery in Mount Laurel, New Jersey.

== Legacy ==
Still's life was chronicled in Henry Charlton Beck's 1936 book, Forgotten Towns of Southern New Jersey, in a chapter entitled "The Doctor of the Pines." Much of Beck's knowledge of Still's life originated with Still's little-known 1877 self-published autobiography (which was identified on the title page as having been "Printed for the author by J.B. Lippincott"). According to Beck, this book was largely overlooked and forgotten and might have remained lost. However, a surviving copy was discovered in the personal effects of Still's only daughter, Lucretia, upon her death in 1930. The work is now in the public domain and has been reprinted by several independent publishers.

Dr. Still's stately home in Medford, New Jersey, was torn down in 1932, but his modest next-door office building was purchased for preservation by the State of New Jersey in 2006. Today it is the Dr. James Still Historic Office Site and Education Center.

His brother, William Still, was an abolitionist writer, activist, historian, and conductor on the Underground Railroad, which helped fugitive slaves reach states where slavery had been outlawed.

Following his father's footsteps, James Thomas Still was the third African-American to graduate from Harvard Medical School in 1871.
