= The Underground Railroad (Still) =

1872 book by William Still

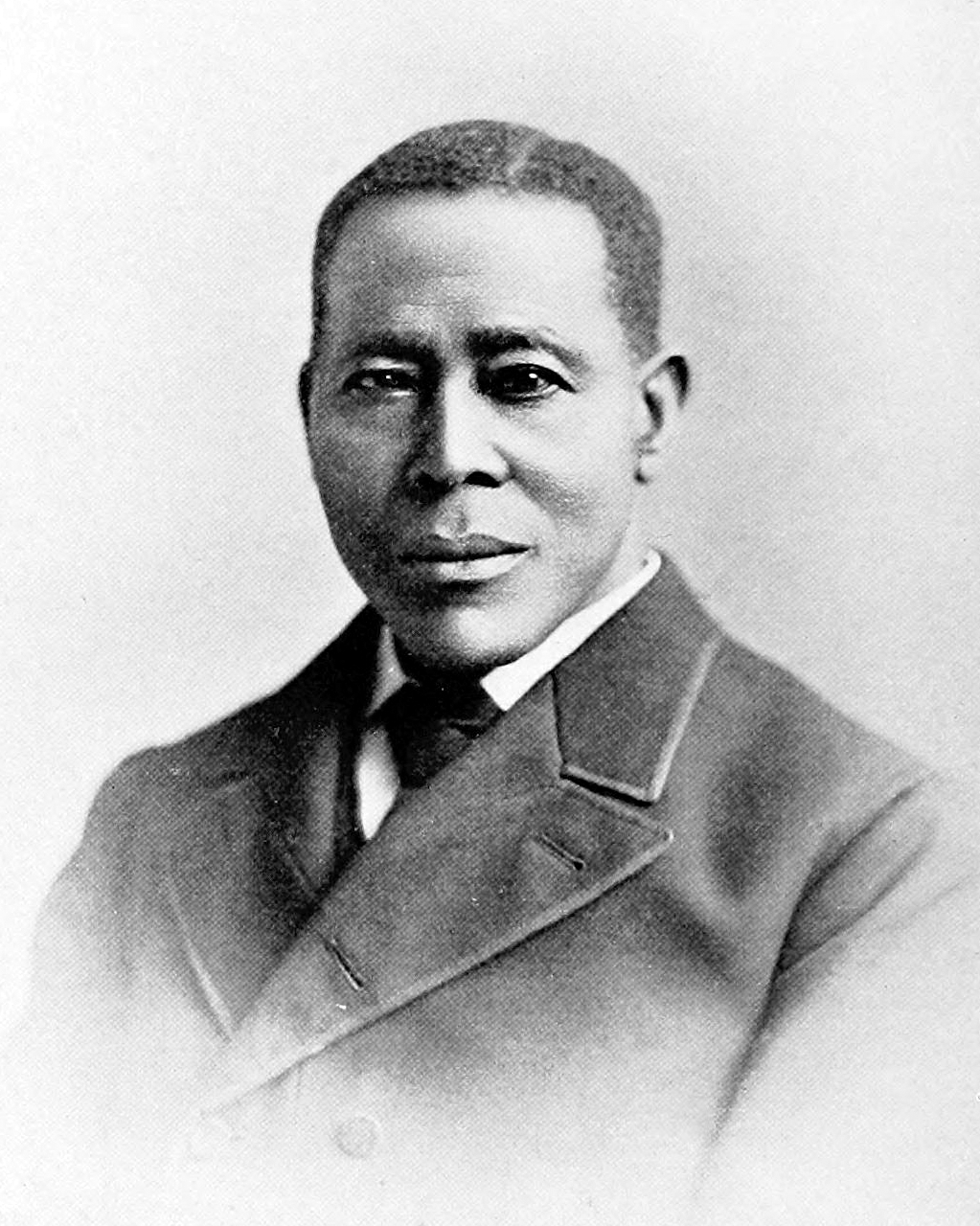
William Still

The Underground Railroad Records is an 1872 book by William Still, who is known as the Father of the Underground Railroad. It is subtitled A record of facts, authentic narratives, letters, &c., narrating the hardships, hair-breadth escapes and death struggles of the slaves in their efforts for freedom, as related by themselves and others, or witnessed by the author; together with sketches of some of the largest stockholders, and most liberal aiders and advisers, of the road.

The book chronicles the stories and methods of some 649 slaves who escaped to freedom via the Underground Railroad. Still assembled his carefully compiled and detailed documentation about those that he had helped escape into the pages of The Underground Railroad Records.

== Selection of freemen whose narratives are included ==
- Ellen and William Craft
- John Dunjee
- Jane Johnson
- Sheridan Ford
