= Anti-Slavery Convention of American Women =

The first Anti-Slavery Convention of American Women was held in New York City on May 9–12, 1837, to discuss the American abolition movement, with two conventions in 1838 and 1839 following. The 1837 gathering represented the first time that women from such a broad geographic area met with the common purpose of promoting the anti-slavery cause among women, and it also was likely the first major convention where women discussed women's rights. Some prominent women went on to be vocal members of the Women's Suffrage Movement, including Lucretia Mott, the Grimké sisters, and Lydia Maria Child.

== Attendees ==
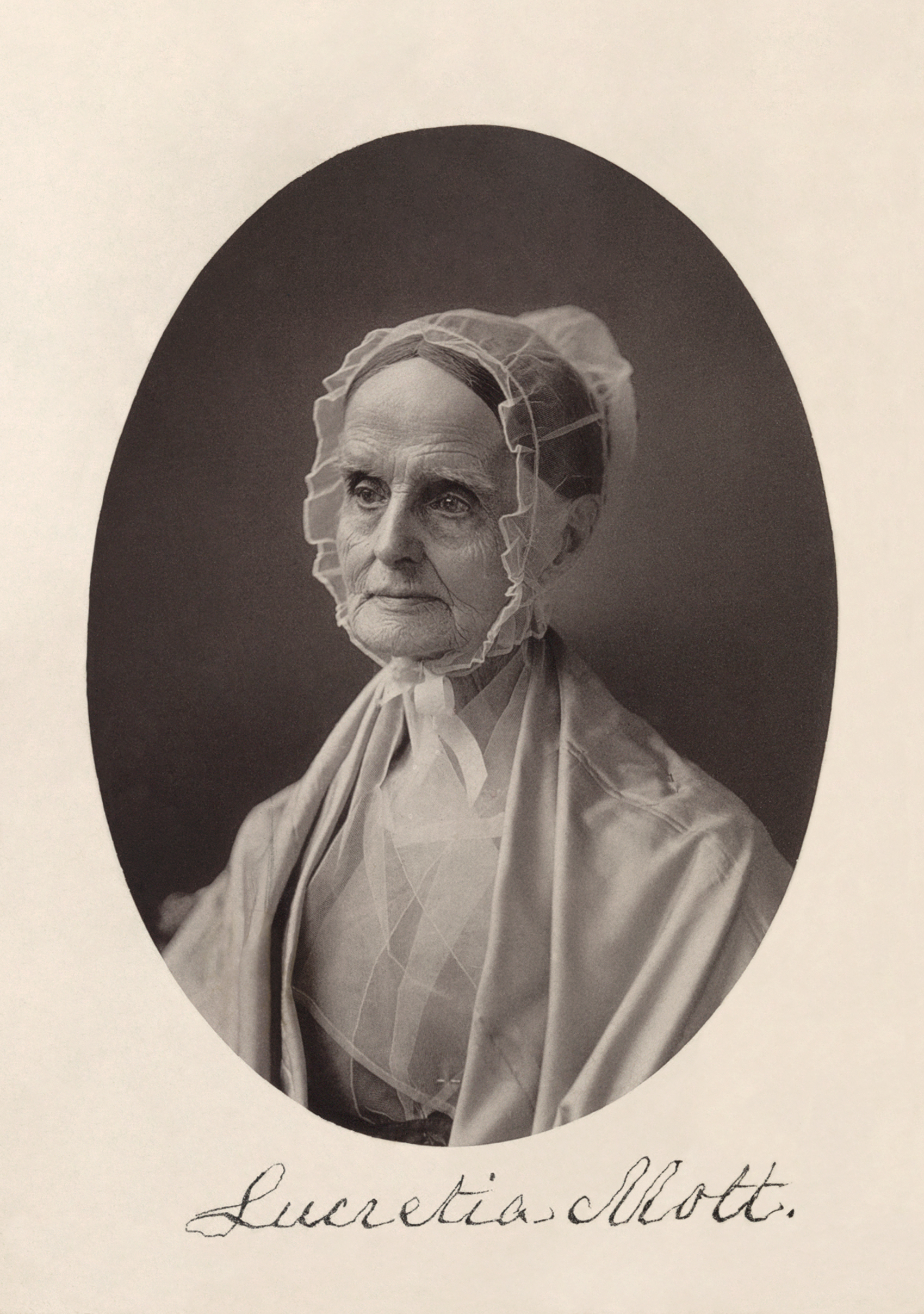
Lucretia Mott

Convention records indicate that attendees were from the following states: New Hampshire (2), Massachusetts (26), Rhode Island (5), New York (109), New Jersey (1), Pennsylvania (25), Maine (1), Connecticut (2), Ohio (2), and South Carolina (2). Lucretia Mott was chosen as the working chair and Mary S. Parker was elected president. Parker had six vice-presidents: Lydia Maria Child, Abby Ann Cox, Grace Douglass, Sarah Moore Grimké, Lucretia Mott, and Ann C. Smith. Mary Grew, Angelina Grimké, Sarah Pugh, and Anne Warren Weston were chosen as secretaries. Participation in the convention was not limited to liberal feminist women, women who were more conservative and believed in restricting how women operated in the organization were also present.

== Role of Black women ==
The Grimké Sisters considered the attendance of Black women at the convention to be crucial for the success of their cause. Sarah Grimké wrote to the Boston and Philadelphia Female Anti-Slavery Societies, requesting that they send African-American delegates. Ultimately, only five black women attended the convention. The limited attendance is explained partly by the relatively low number of African-American women that were enrolled in anti-slavery groups at this time. The reason that a relatively low number of black American women were present is because most did not have access to wealth or resources that would have provided them the ability to focus on the conventions goals. In general, the convention was dominated by wealthier and more privileged women. It is estimated that black women never constituted more than 10% of the membership of any integrated anti-slavery groups. (Some anti-slavery groups had only white members.) Additionally, many black women simply did not have the economic resources needed to travel to New York, a journey and experience fraught with discrimination and exclusion. For example, Julia Williams, a black attendee from Boston, traveled with white attendees from her society. She was often forced to eat meals separately from her party and was required to stay in a segregated boarding house.

== Anti-Slavery Convention of American Women of 1837 ==
The first Anti-Slavery Convention of American Women was held in New York City on May 9–12, 1837. One hundred and seventy-five women, from ten different states and representing twenty female antislavery groups, gathered to discuss their role in the American abolition movement. Seventy-one delegates from multiple different states served in the convention, with Massachusetts and Pennsylvania sending the most. During this convention, the attendees elected officers, adopted resolutions about their goals, and committed to the abolitionist cause. They "organized committees that created documents such as an address to free Black people, communications to other female anti-slavery societies that weren't present, and appeals to all American women."

This gathering represented the first time that women from such a broad geographic area met with the common purpose of promoting the anti-slavery cause among women. "Lucretia Mott served as temporary chairman, but" Mary S. Parker was the President of the gathering. "Six vice presidents were selected: Lydia Maria Child, Abby Ann Cox (of New York City), Grace Douglas, Sarah M. Grimké, Mott, and Ann C. Smith." "Four persons were chosen as secretaries: Mary Grew, Angelina Grimké, Sarah Pugh, and Anne Warren Weston (sister of Maria Weston Chapman)." Many of these women went on to be vocal members of the Women's Suffrage Movement, including Mott, the Grimké sisters, and Child. The attendees included women of color, the wives and daughters of slaveowners, and poor women.

It was a correspondence between Grew and Chapman concerning a women's anti-slavery committee that is credited with the idea of this convention. Grew argued for the importance of an executive committee that would help organize and streamline the efforts of female-anti-slavery organizations. Sarah Grimké played an important role in ensuring that Black women were invited and attended the event. However, at this first convention, only five Black women attended, since many did not have the financial resources to make the trip there.

Professor Ann D. Gordon has described the Anti-Slavery Convention of American Women as the first convention at which women discussed women's rights, in this case focusing on the rights of African-American women. It was not until 1848 that the first convention devoted to women's rights in general, the Seneca Falls Convention, took place; it was promoted as first decades later by convention organizer Elizabeth Cady Stanton.

== Effects of the 1837 Convention ==
The convention had lasting effects of women's antislavery organizations for a variety of reasons. First, it provided a means for women from different states and backgrounds to meet in person and fostered a strong sense of community within the movement. Additionally, the convention promoted increased interactions between black and white women. Lastly, the close of the convention was marked with an increase in women's antislavery petitions, which more than doubled in number in 1837. These petitions were significant in the antislavery movement, as door-to-door campaigns brought the antislavery agenda to thousands of individuals that might have not been exposed to this information otherwise.

This was the first of three annual convention of American female abolitionists. The next convention was notable in that it ended with abolition's grand new hall in Philadelphia being burnt down by protesters. Several of the women at this convention, such as Mary Grew and Lucretia Mott, were chosen as delegates to the World Anti-Slavery Convention in London in 1840. When they arrived they were told that women were not expected and they were not allowed to speak or sit with the men; their seating was separated. Garrison and other American men sat with the women.

== Anti-Slavery Convention of American Women of 1838 ==
The second Anti-Slavery Convention of American Women took place at Pennsylvania Hall on Tuesday May 15, 1838. There were 203 delegates and 73 corresponding members. Similar to the previous year, Mary S. Parker of Boston was chosen as president. Despite growing opposition to the objective of the group from the general public, the convention still decided to meet and create resolutions. One of the most significant campaigns that the group undertook was petitioning to Congress to end slavery. The committee also decided to withdraw church support if the churches were pro-slavery and to petition them to adopt anti-slavery principles. Finally, they expanded upon their philosophy of nonresistance which was steeped in their religious beliefs. A committee was organized to formally publish the goals of the group.

Even though the members of the convention were able to successfully devise up multiple resolutions regarding their anti-slavery activism, they still faced fierce public opposition. Mobs of people were deeply upset about the objection of the convention and particularly opposed the racial mixing or miscegenation that occurred. During the convention, the president of the Pennsylvania Hall Association suggested that Black women should not attend the remainder of the convention for their safety. The women disagreed, and despite the danger they were in, believed that keeping the meeting interracial was more important than the threats.

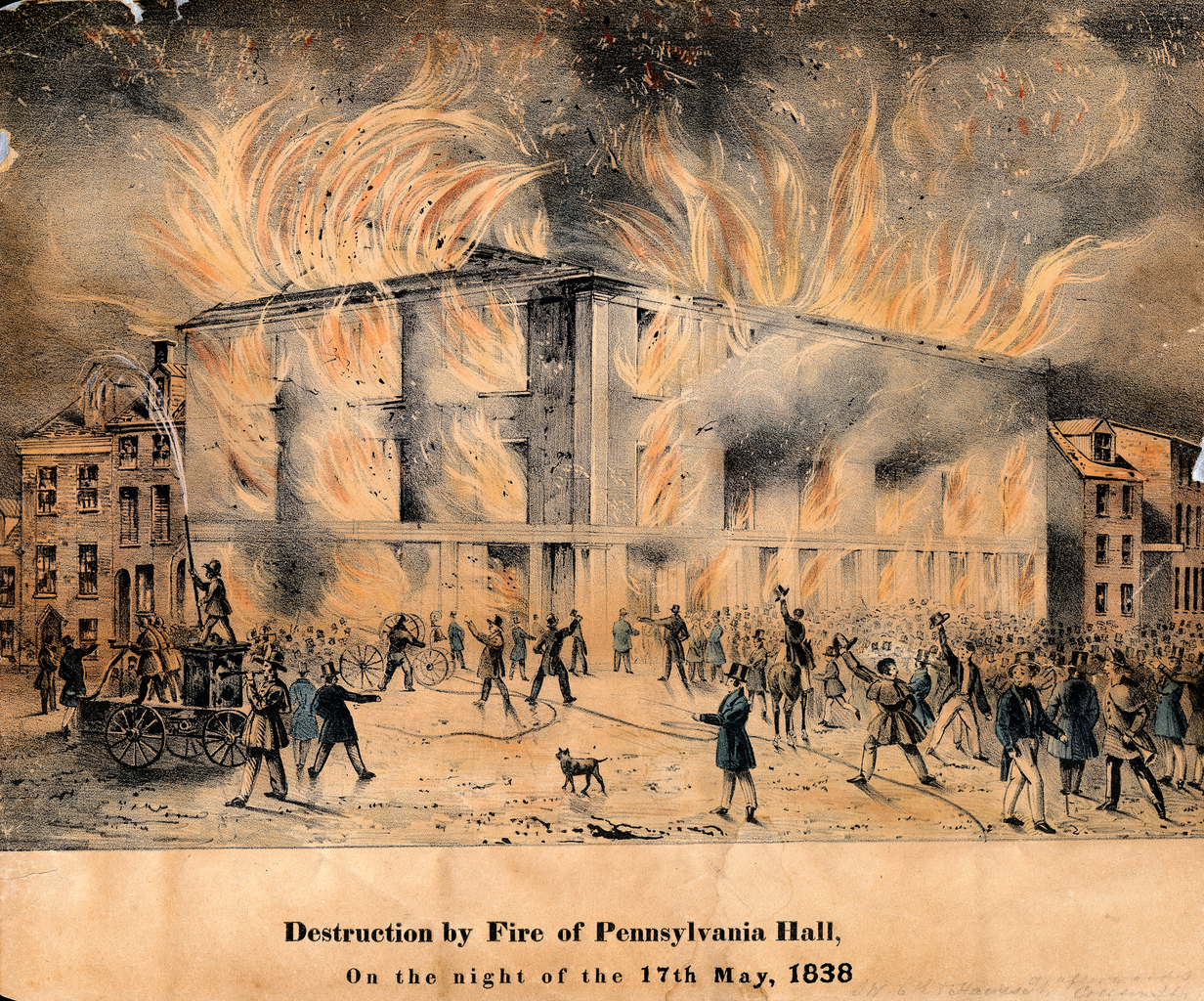
Burning of Pennsylvania Hall during the 1838 Anti-Slavery Convention of American Women

There was also an anxiety among racist white people that abolitionists would encourage black people to find employment which would increase competition for jobs. Despite the tension, the mayor of Philadelphia, John Swift, refused to get police security for those at the convention. As the mob continued to grow, the men at the convention urged the women to seek safety and exit out the back of the building. Instead of doing that, the women linked arms and faced the mob head-on. These economic and social anxieties culminated when a mob of around 10,000 people surrounded Pennsylvania Hall, burning it to the ground.

Despite this, the women went on with the convention and met at the schoolhouse where Sarah Pugh taught. In that schoolhouse, the women prayed for the protection of their allies, as well as for the rioters who burned Pennsylvania Hall. While the women continued their mission, the grand jury of Philadelphia exonerated the rioters for their actions. The city council concluded that the rioters had been provoked by the advocacy of mixing races, which was immoral to a majority of the city.

There were different routes women took after the burning of Pennsylvania Hall. Some left the anti-slavery movement as a whole, while others opted for organizations that were not as controversial. Some of the women did not let the violence faze them, and continued strong in the movement.

== Anti-Slavery Convention of American Women of 1839 ==
The third Anti-Slavery Convention of American Women took place at the Hall of Pennsylvania Writing School on Wednesday May 1, 1839. There were 102 delegates and 68 members in attendance. At this point in time people in Pennsylvania were becoming increasing open to abolitionism. During the convention, people were urged to continue their petitioning efforts to federal and local states. Last year's resolution which dictated that abolitionists would only use products that had been created through free labour and would do their best to avoid the use of slave labor created products was also maintained and expanded upon. The women of the convention believed that using products created through the exploitation of slaves maintained the system of slavery and was a sin against God. However, there was some opposition to this resolution because not everyone believed that using only using free produce was realistic and others argued that they might not be notable difference enough in the conditions of paid labor workers and slaves that warranted the resolution to be enacted. Another important resolution reached during this convention was that abolitionists would work to improve the lot of free Blacks by providing education. They would also work to provide free blacks the necessary skills to succeed at their trades.

Although public opinion was steadily becoming more in support of abolitionism there were still many people who fiercely despised it and wanted to stop the progress of the convention. Therefore, similar to last year there were mobs that threatened violence against the people who attended the convention. The members decided against having police protection because they considered it to be contrary to their policy of nonresistance and police often times shared the opinions of the mob.

== Resolutions ==
The very first resolution was to agree the convention's purpose, which was to "interest women in the subject of anti-slavery, and establish a system of operations throughout every town and village in the free States, that would exert a powerful influence in the abolition of American slavery."

During the convention, these women discussed a variety of issues and voted on numerous resolutions, not limited to, the role of Christianity in slavery, the denunciation of northern participation and compliancy, and the role of women within the anti-slavery movement. An important resolution that was reached during this first convention was that women would use their Christian values and morality to fight for anti-slavery. It was framed as a duty to undertake as a Christian and women were encouraged to use their voice, money, and status to achieve the group's goals. Lydia Maria Child was one of the main proponents in arguing that slavery was anti-Christian, declaring that being against slavery was "the cause of God," and that it was "the duty of every human being to labor to preserve, and to restore all who are deprived of it; God's gift of freedom." For example, one resolution discussed whether evangelical and missionary associations should accept money from slave owners. Child proposed the condemnation of organizations supported by churches that received monetary donations from slaveholders. That proposal was accepted.

Angelina Grimké proposed resolutions to hold the North accountable for their complicity with slavery. She condemned northerners for complying with the South in returning fugitive slaves. Sarah Grimké proposed that northerners who marry slaveholders should be condemned, as they were contributing to the institution of slavery. Lydia Maria Child also made a resolution, proposing that northern states repeal the law that slaveholders retained ownership of slaves while visiting free northern states.

Women also debated whether attendees of the convention should be recorded with the designation of Miss or Mrs. Also discussed was the potential formation of general executive committee for the women's movement. This resolution failed, as some attendees believed that a female-headed committee would segregate men from their efforts and limit any potential merger with the male-dominated American Anti-Slavery Society. The final resolution passed at the convention was an agreement among the women that unity and cooperation was crucial to their efforts. Some of the topics that were scheduled to be brought up at the convention included: an appeal to the women of nominally free states, an address to free colored Americans, a letter to the women of Great Britain, a circular to female antislavery societies in the United States, a letter to juvenile antislavery societies in the United States, and a letter to congressman, John Quincy Adams. Committees of three were appointed to the topics in order to prepare them. Several were published by the convention.

They published An Address to Free Colored Americans.

== See also ==
- American Female Anti-Slavery Society
- Pennsylvania Hall (Philadelphia)
- Philadelphia Nativist Riots

== Publications ==
- An Address to Free Colored Americans. Issued by an Anti-Slavery Convention of American Women Held in the City of New York, by Adjournment from 9th to 12th May, 1837. New York. 1837.
