= Oliver Johnson (writer) =

American abolitionist and writer (1809–1889)

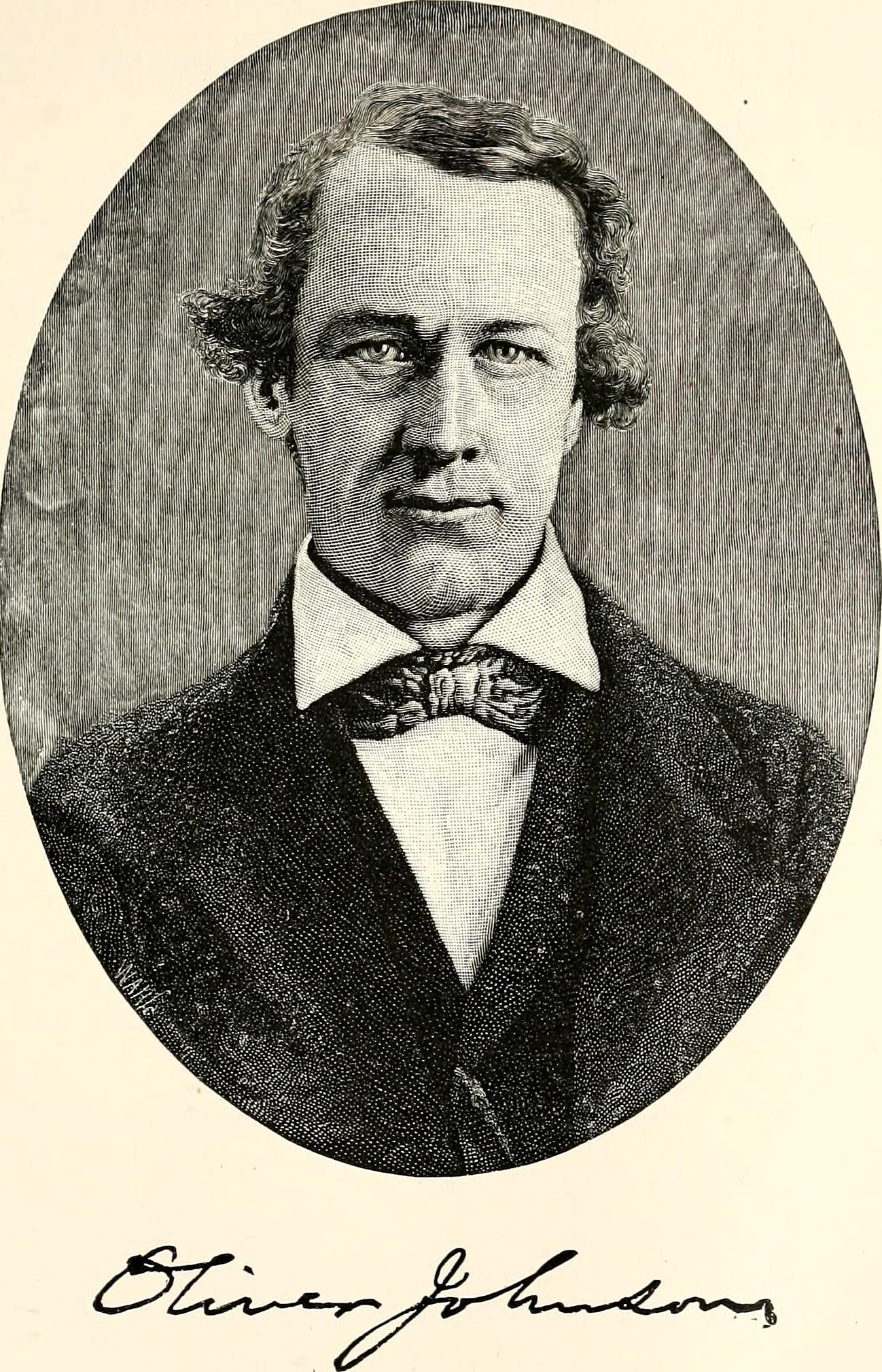
- Etching from a daguerreotype made 1845
- Born: December 27, 1809; Vermont, U.S.
- Died: December 10, 1889 (aged 79); New York, U.S.
- Occupations: Abolitionist, activist, writer, editor, lecturer

Oliver Johnson (December 27, 1809 – December 10, 1889) was an American abolitionist, journalist, editor, lecturer, and Underground Railroad conductor who was once described as the "first lieutenant" of William Lloyd Garrison, the editor of The Liberator newspaper. Johnson regarded slavery as the "sum of all villainies" and in the period leading up to the American Civil War was so loathed in the south that "as quiet as a Quaker in his personal disposition, yet the time was...when Oliver Johnson would have lost his life within forty-eight hours after crossing Mason and Dixon's line." In 1844 Johnson was publisher of the American edition of the Narrative of the Life of Moses Grandy. Johnson wrote a biography of his friend and colleague called Garrison: An Outline of His Life. After the war, Johnson was employed as an editor and writer at various New York-based newspapers including the Tribune and the Independent.

== Life and work ==
Johnson was born in Peacham, Vermont, the youngest child of Ziba Johnson and Sally Lincoln, natives of Westmoreland, New Hampshire. He was raised in Vermont and began his working life as a printer. In his 20s he was a "well-connected route manager" on the Underground Railroad, with strong ties to Quaker station managers and a focus on navigating people through New England to the Canadian border.

On December 10, 1831, he was one of the cofounders of the Abolition Party, along with Garrison, Samuel E. Sewall, Ellis Gray Loring, David Lee Child, Isaac Knapp, Robert B. Hall, Isaac Child, John Cutts Smith, and Joshua Coffin. On January 6, 1832, he was one of the 12 original signatories to the charter of the New England Anti-Slavery Society, along with William Lloyd Garrison, Robert T. Hall, Arnold Buffum, William J. Snelling, John E. Fuller, Moses Thacher, Joshua Coffin, Stillman B. Newcomb, Benjamin C. Bacon, Isaac Knapp, and Henry K. Stockton. Near the end of his life, Johnson recalled that it was a dark and frigid night, and the ground was covered with slush as they left the building, now called the African Meeting House, and "I doubt if any one of our number could have contributed $100 to the society's treasury without bankrupting himself." In these early days, Johnson ran an abolitionist newspaper called Christian Soldier, and later edited the Anti-Slavery Standard. He probably wrote the lyrics to an abolitionist song called "Hark! A Voice from Heaven".

An example of his reporting is an 1841 account from Hope H. Slatter's slave pen in Baltimore—the jailer and Shadrack H. Slatter initially took him for a prospective buyer—about which wrote in The Liberator:

Here I saw nearly a hundred human beings, of all ages and both sexes, locked up like so many wild beasts, and awaiting purchasers. Many of them flocked around me as I entered, evidently supposing that I had come to look at the assortment, and to make choice of such as I wanted to buy. I at once undeceived them, by telling them that I was an abolitionist; that I abhorred slavery as one of the worst of crimes and that I had been laboring, to the extent of my ability, for several years, to procure their emancipation. I told them, also, that thousands of people in the northern States had associated together for the purpose of breaking their chains; and begged them to remember, for their consolation under the sore trials they were called suffer, that although the day of emancipation might not come in their time, some of their children would surely live to see it...They listened to me with an eagerness which showed how deeply they were interested in what I said; and the hearty 'God bless you,' which some of them uttered, while tears of gratitude filled their eyes, was more than enough to compensate me for all my labors in their behalf. The pleasure I felt in communicating to them these 'glad tidings' was indescribable. Among the group were several mothers, with infants in their arms, who told me, with deep emotion, that they had been sold away from husbands and children, whom they never expected to see again in this world.

— Oliver Johnson, "Baltimore Jail — Slatter's Slave Prison," The Liberator, November 19, 1841

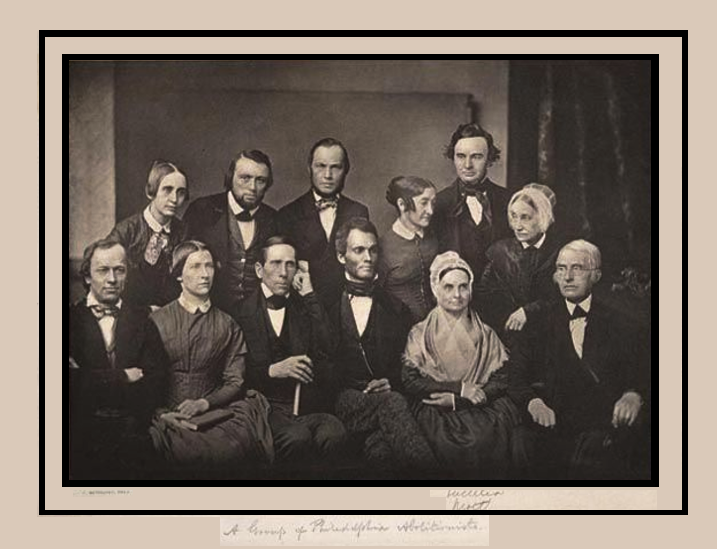
Oliver Johnson, front row, far left in 1851 photograph of Philadelphia abolitionists, Pennsylvania Abolition Society, founded 1775, along with (top row) Mary Grew, Edward M. Davis, Haworth Wetherald, Abigail Kimber, Miller McKim, Sarah Pugh, and (seated) Johnson, then Margaret Jones Burleigh, Benjamin C. Bacon, Robert Purvis, Lucretia Mott, and James Mott

In 1862 Oliver Johnson met with Abraham Lincoln as the head of a delegation from the Religious Society of Progressive Friends with an "earnest demand" that he make some kind of emancipation proclamation in regards to the enslaved of the rebel states. In 1879 he served as one of the eight pallbearers at Garrison's funeral in Boston.

Johnson was the father of a daughter with his second wife, whom he married after the death of his first wife in 1872. Johnson died in Brooklyn and was buried in Chester County, Pennsylvania.
