= Elizabeth Neall Gay =

American abolitionist (1819–1907)

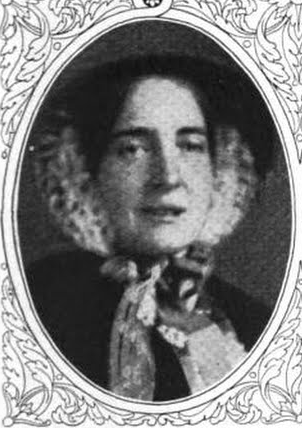
- Elizabeth Johns Neall Gay in 1854, from a 1910 publication
- Born: Elizabeth Johns Neall; November 7, 1819; Pennsylvania, U.S.
- Died: December 9, 1907 (aged 88); Livingston, New York, U.S.
- Occupations: Abolitionist; suffragist
- Spouse: Sydney Howard Gay (m. 1845; died 1888)
- Children: 4
- Relatives: Warner Mifflin (grandfather)

Elizabeth Johns Neall Gay (November 7, 1819 – December 9, 1907) was an American abolitionist and suffragist. She was one of the American Quaker women delegates refused admission to the World Anti-Slavery Convention in London in 1840.

== Early life ==
Elizabeth Johns Neall was the daughter of Daniel Neall Sr. and Sarah Mifflin Neall. Her family were Philadelphia Quakers and active in social reform movements, especially abolition. Her father was a dentist and an inventor, and president of Pennsylvania Hall. Her maternal grandfather, Warner Mifflin, was a prominent Quaker abolitionist before and after the American Revolution.

== Activism ==
Elizabeth Neall served on the executive committee of the Pennsylvania Female Anti-Slavery Society, and was an officer of the Pennsylvania Anti-Slavery Society. She attended the 1840 World Anti-Slavery Convention in London with Lucretia Mott, Mary Grew, Sarah Pugh, Abby Southwick Stephenson, Emily Winslow, and Abigail Kimber; the convention's refusal to seat women abolitionists as delegates spurred Mott, Elizabeth Cady Stanton, and others to organize the American women's rights movement in 1840s. She corresponded with John Greenleaf Whittier and Lucretia Mott, among other Quaker activists. After her husband's death, she preserved important papers from his editing life, including the original manuscripts of writings by James Russell Lowell.

== Personal life and legacy ==
Elizabeth Neall married abolitionist editor and writer Sydney Howard Gay in 1845. They had four children together; daughter Mary Otis Gay Willcox was also active in the women's suffrage movement and other causes. Her husband died in 1888; she died in 1907, at the age of 89, at her home in Livingston, New York. Some of her correspondence is in the Sydney Howard Gay Papers at Columbia University, and in the James Russell Lowell and Sydney Howard Gay papers at Harvard University. Her granddaughter and namesake, Elizabeth Neall Gay Pierce, was national president of the Colonial Dames of America.
