= George Bradburn =

American politician

Rev. George Bradburn
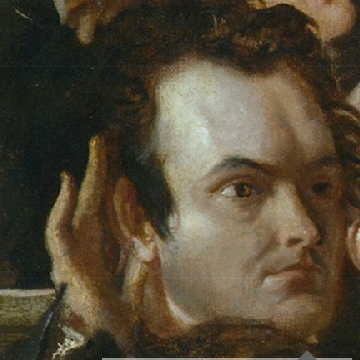
- Bradburn at the 1840 Anti Slavery convention, holding his hand to his ear.
- Born: March 4, 1806; Attleboro, Massachusetts, United States
- Died: July 26, 1880 (aged 74)
- Education: Harvard Divinity School
- Occupation: Unitarian Minister
- Known for: Slavery abolitionist, Politician and lecturer
- Spouse(s): 1.Lydia Barnard; 2.Frances Parker
- Children: one died young
- Parent(s): James and Sarah Leach (born Hovey) Bradburn

George Bradburn (March 4, 1806 – July 26, 1880) was an American politician and Unitarian minister in Massachusetts known for his support for abolitionism and women's rights. He attended the 1840 conference on Anti-Slavery in London where he made a stand against the exclusion of female delegates. In 1843 he was with Frederick Douglass on a lecture tour in Indiana when they were attacked. Lydia Maria Child wrote with regard to his work on anti-slavery that he had "a high place among the tried and true."

== Biography ==
Bradburn was born March 4, 1806, to James and Sarah Bradburn in Attleboro, a small town in Massachusetts. After his mother died, he was brought up by his half sister Fanny. He first took a trade as a machinist until he decided to pursue further studies at the age on nineteen. He continued his education at Phillips Exeter Academy in New Hampshire. After studying with Hosea Ballou II he attended the Harvard Divinity School.

His first ministerial position was in Nantucket in 1831, but oddly, his church was sold while he was away and his congregation was later disbanded in 1834. While in Nantucket he met and married his first wife, Lydia, but within a year of marriage she had died, and his only daughter died a year later. This cast a "shadow over his whole life." Moreover, Bradburn had begun to lose his sense of hearing. However, he was well regarded and was elected by the Whigs to serve as the Massachusetts Legislature in 1839 for three years.

He became associated with the American Anti-Slavery Society in 1839 and he brought forward related radical legislation. He led a movement which repealed a marriage law. After this change, "People in Massachusetts, wishing to marry, are under no necessity of comparing complexions" in 1842.

=== The year of the "World's Convention" ===
In 1840, a woman's right to serve on an American anti-slavery committee was established when Abby Kelley became a full member of the business committee of the American Anti-Slavery Society at their annual convention. This was not without cost, and some of the members left the meeting, but others who were known as the "Garrisonian wing" believed in equal rights of all Americans, irrespective of gender. So when an invitation was received for the World Anti-Slavery Convention on June 12, 1840, in London, it was not surprising that Massachusetts decided to not only send William Lloyd Garrison, Wendell Phillips and Bradburn, but also Lydia Maria Child, Harriet Martineau and Maria Weston Chapman.

Bradburn travelled first class on the ship Roscoe on the May 7, 1840. Other anti-slavery delegates aboard the ship were James and Lucretia Mott, Emily Winslow and her father Isaac, Abby South, Henry Grew his daughter Mary Grew and Elizabeth Neall. After they arrived many took the opportunity to tour England. Bradburn was able to visit various places including Blenheim Palace, Eaton Hall, Stratford on Avon, Oxford University and Warwick Castle. He was later able to call on these experiences in lectures later in life.

Just before the World's Anti-Slavery Convention opened, the British organiser Joseph Sturge explained that female delegates would not be allowed. This "insane innovation, this woman-intruding delusion," was rebuked by the leading English Anti-Slavery members. Some of the male delegates from America sided with the women, including George Bradburn, Wendell Phillips, James Mott, William Adam, Isaac Winslow, J. P. Miller and Henry B. Stanton. Bradburn said during the debate "Prove to me, gentlemen, that your Bible sanctions the slavery of woman — the complete subjugation of one-half the race to the other — and I should feel that the best work I could do for humanity would be to make a grand bonfire of every Bible in the Universe". William Lloyd Garrison, who was not there until the 17th, refused to take his seat until there was equality in seating. Henry Grew spoke in favour of the men's rights to exclude women despite his daughter being one of the excluded delegates. The American women had to join the other female observers like Lady Byron and were not allowed to participate in the convention. Not only was the equality of the sexes debated, but Bradburn said that "introducing any such words as 'Christian,' 'Religious,' and the like, by which persons of any religion whatever, or of no religion whatever, should be excluded from the Anti-Slavery platform.

Blackburn is on the left edge in this painting which is of the 1840 Anti-Slavery Convention. Move your cursor to identify him or click icon to enlarge

The portrait of Bradburn which is shown at the top of this article and in Haydon's picture of the 1840 World Anti-Slavery convention was completed in a small room at the Freemasons hall where the convention was held. Bradburn commented that he felt that he had been given "too much severity or sharpness," but Haydon assured him that he looked "revolutionary" when giving his speeches. Bradburn made time after a visit to France to complete a third sitting on August 3, 1840. Bradburn then visited Newcastle, Scotland and Ireland, visiting people he had met at the convention including the Irish Nationalist leader Daniel O'Connell and Lady Byron, the mathematician (and the poet's estranged wife).

== 100 conventions ==
In 1843 Bradburn accompanied Frederick Douglass and William A. White on a lecture tour organised by the American Anti-Slavery Society and called "100 conventions." This was not a tour preaching to the converted and he was, subsequently, attacked. Douglass was attacked and his hand broken so badly that he never recovered its full use. Other sources also place Bradburn there at Pendleton in Indiana on September 16, 1843, when the attack took place.

From 1846 to 1849, Bradburn edited the, "Pioneer and Herald of Freedom" in Lynn, Massachusetts.

Douglass told a group in Ireland of a story about how Blackburn, who now was nearly completely deaf, was challenged for assuming that ministers could adopt the abolitionists message as they "must live." Bradburn said, "I deny any such necessity — I dispute your premises. I deny that it is necessary for any man to live, unless he can live honestly."

=== 1850 ===
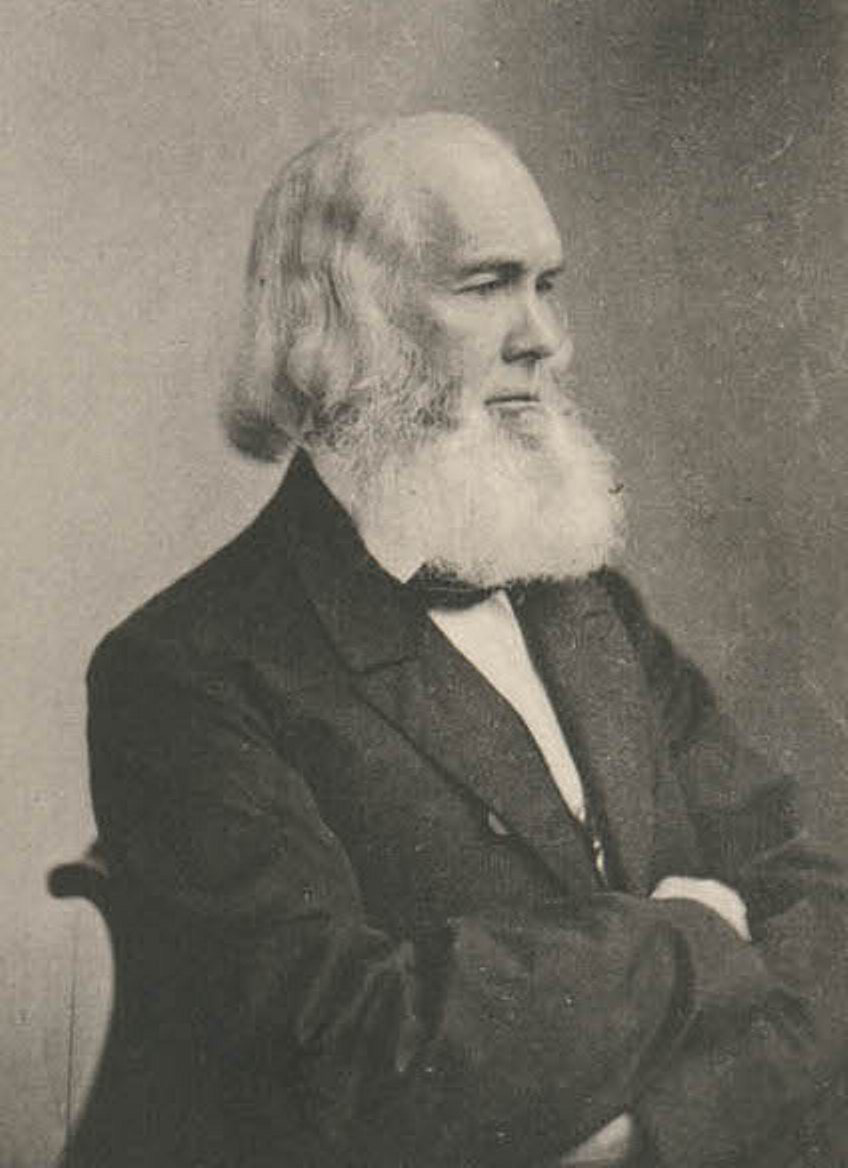
In later life

In 1850 in Boston, Bradburn married Frances H. Parker. Although she later would become an invalid and prevent him from taking up overseas positions, she was the one who eventually completed his memoirs. That year he was working for the Boston Chronotype and he attended the two-day National Woman's Rights Convention which was held in Brinley Hall, Worcester. The convention was called to order by Sarah H. Earle, and chaired by Paulina Wright Davis of Rhode Island on October 23, 1850. There were 268 delegates, but the vast majority were from Massachusetts. The news of the convention was widely reported, but frequently in a disparaging way. Only four local newspapers were thought to deal with the subject well and one of those was the Lynn Pioneer (which was edited by Bradburn).

In 1851, George and Frances moved to Cleveland, Ohio, where Bradburn helped to edit the True Democrat, a daily newspaper. After two years he went on lecture tours where he would sometimes speak every night for 26 days. His lectures at this time were not only political but drew on his experiences in Europe in 1840. He was able to use his trip to London as the basis of entertaining and informative lectures.

In 1859, he occupied the pulpit of a Unitarian church in Athol, Massachusetts, and resided there for another two years. He made good friends there and returned to visit ever summer for the next twenty years. He took a job in a customs house which had been organised by his friend Samuel Chase, but he sadly missed his ability to work. At the end of his life he called out to William A. White, who his wife remembered as a friend from his time lecturing to thousands.

== Death ==
At Bradburn's funeral in 1880, Lysander Spooner read a eulogy and was a pallbearer. His wife published his biography in 1883. Lydia Maria Child wrote "Surely in this country, and within this century, no other cause has so tested the moral natures of men and women, as did the anti-slavery cause in its early days: and no one who knew George Bradburn at that time will doing question his right to a high place among the tried and true."
