= Mary Grew =

American abolitionist and suffragist

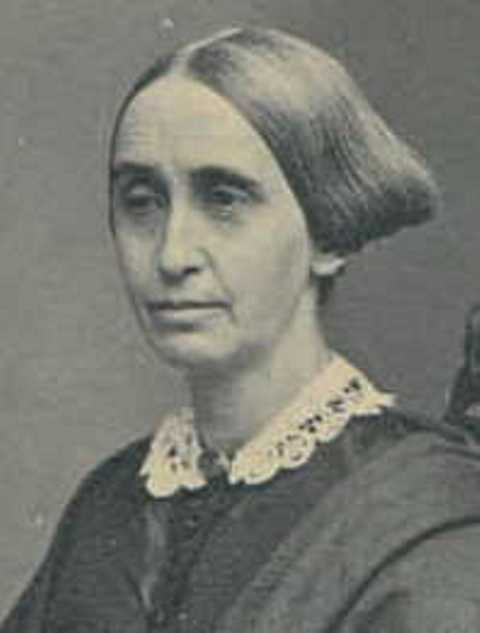
- Born: September 1, 1813; Hartford
- Died: October 10, 1896; Philadelphia
- Occupations: Abolitionist, women's rights activist, journalist, editor, suffragette
- Partner: Margaret Jones Burleigh
- Father: Henry Grew

Mary Grew (September 1, 1813 – October 10, 1896) was an American abolitionist and suffragist whose career spanned nearly the entire 19th century. She was a leader of the Philadelphia Female Anti-Slavery Society and the Pennsylvania Anti-Slavery Society. She was one of eight women delegates, all from the United States, who were denied their seats at the London World Anti-Slavery Convention, in 1840. An editor and journalist, she wrote for abolitionist newspapers and chronicled the work of Philadelphia's abolitionists over more than three decades. She was a gifted public orator at a time when it was still noteworthy for women to speak in public. Her obituary summarized her impact: "Her biography would be a history of all reforms in Pennsylvania for fifty years."

== Early life ==
Grew was born in Hartford, Connecticut in 1813. Her father was Henry Grew who was an abolitionist religious writer of strong opinions. Her father married four times; Mary's mother was his third wife, Kate Merrow. Mary was particularly close to her older half-sister Susan. Mary attended Catharine Beecher’s Hartford Female Seminary, which gave her the best education available to a girl in the 1820s. In 1834, the family moved to Philadelphia, where Mary joined the newly-formed Philadelphia Female Anti-Slavery Society.

== Abolitionist career ==
Grew was a radical abolitionist, aligned with William Lloyd Garrison. Pennsylvania abolitionist groups were integrated by race and sex, unlike some abolitionist groups in the country. Grew was an officer of both the Pennsylvania Anti-Slavery Society and the Philadelphia Female Anti-Slavery Society. The Female Anti-Slavery Society met frequently, and its annual craft fair raised funds that supported the work of both organizations.

In recognition of the group's significance, four officers of the Philadelphia Female Anti-Slavery Society were chosen to represent the state as delegates to the World Anti-Slavery Convention in London in 1840: Mary Grew, Sarah Pugh, Elizabeth Neall, and Abby Kimber. All four were white, though the Philadelphia Female Anti-Slavery Society included African-American women among its members and founders. Lucretia Mott, the most prominent Philadelphia abolitionist, traveled to London as a delegate for the national American Anti-Slavery Society.

1840 World Anti-Slavery Convention. Move your cursor to identify delegates or click the icon to enlarge. Mary would have sat at the very back with the other women (Henry is not in the painting).

Grew traveled to England with her father, who was also a delegate. They departed on the ship Roscoe on 7 May 1840. Other delegates aboard the ship were the other women from the Philadelphia Female Anti-Slavery Society, James and Lucretia Mott, Emily Winslow and her father Isaac, and Abby Southwick of the Massachusetts Anti-Slavery Society. According to Mrs. Mott's diary of the trip, Mary was "quite intimate" with George Bradburn. After they arrived, Bradburn traveled with the Grews to various locations, including Birmingham, as Mary wanted to see her father's birthplace.

Before and during the convention, there was fierce debate about the participation and seating of women delegates and attendees. Her father sided with the British organisers and spoke in favour of the men's right to exclude women, knowing that this would exclude Mary. Eventually women were allowed into the convention, but they were not allowed to speak and they had to sit separately.

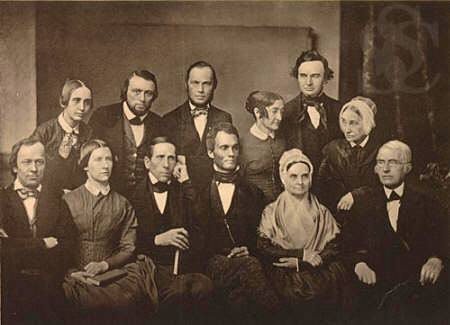
Back row, from left to right, are Mary Grew, E. M. Davis, Haworth Wetherald, Abby Kimber, J. Miller McKim, and Sarah Pugh. Front row, from left to right, are Oliver Johnson, Mrs. Margaret Jones Burleigh, Benjamin C. Bacon, Robert Purvis, Lucretia Mott, and James Mott.

Back in Philadelphia, Mary Grew continued to excel as a writer and speaker for the cause. She frequently spoke alongside Sojourner Truth, both before the Civil War and after. In 1853, Grew and Truth spoke at a meeting of the Female Anti-Slavery Society; and they both spoke at the organizing meeting of the Pennsylvania Woman Suffrage Association in December 1869.

Along with her contemporary Mary Ann Shadd Cary, Grew was an early newspaperwoman. She edited and co-edited the Pennsylvania Freeman, the state’s abolitionist newspaper. After the Freeman merged with the National Anti-Slavery Standard in 1854, Mary wrote for the National as a Philadelphia correspondent. Among Mary Grew’s enduring contributions to abolition was her chronicle of the work of the Philadelphia Female Anti-Slavery Society. She wrote the group’s annual report each year; the reports, some as long as 100 pages, were published as pamphlets. In 1870, when the group disbanded, Grew wrote a retrospective on its 37 years of work.

It was a correspondence between Mary Grew and Maria Weston Chapman concerning a women's anti-slavery committee that created the first Anti-Slavery Convention of American Women in New York in 1837. The following year, the second Women's Anti-Slavery Convention met in Philadelphia, at the brand new Pennsylvania Hall. As the women met, a mob gathered, enraged that women were speaking in public and that Black and white women and men were gathering together. The mob burned the Hall to the ground.

== Suffrage career ==
The discrimination that Mary Grew, Lucretia Mott, and the other women delegates to the World Anti-Slavery Convention experienced in 1840 was one of the catalysts for the Seneca Falls Convention. Grew, though committed to women’s equality, was not at Seneca Falls in 1848. That meeting was called on short notice, in part because Lucretia Mott was visiting western New York from Philadelphia.

That same year, Mary Grew lobbied the Pennsylvania legislature to pass the Married Women’s Property Act.

After the Civil War, with ratification of the 15th Amendment imminent, Mary Grew turned more of her attention to women’s suffrage. When the suffragists split over the exclusion of women from the 15th Amendment, Grew joined Lucy Stone and the American Woman Suffrage Association. Grew was the founding president of the Pennsylvania Woman Suffrage Association, and its head for 23 years.

Grew was exasperated with those who demanded justification for women voting. At the American Woman Suffrage Association convention in 1871 she asked rhetorically: “What is woman going to do with the ballot? I don’t know; I don’t care; and it is of no consequence. Their right to the ballot does not rest on the way in which they vote.”

Mary Grew's accomplishments did not change her father's mind about women's equality. In 1854, the fifth annual National Women's Rights Convention was held in Philadelphia. Mary was on the host committee. Her father demanded the floor, and ended up debating Lucretia Mott, during which he lauded the supremacy and authority of men.

In November 1870 she chaired the first anniversary meeting of the Pennsylvania Woman Suffrage Association and the poet John Greenleaf Whittier was amongst those expected. Whittier sent his apologies and a poem in tribute title "How Mary Grew".

How Mary Grew

With wisdom far beyond her years
And graver than her wondering peers ...
She dared the scornful laugh of men,
The hounding mob, the slanderer’s pen.
She did the work she found to do,—
A Christian heroine, Mary Grew!

The freed slave thanks her; blessing comes
To her from women’s weary homes;
The wronged and erring find in her
Their censor mild and comforter.
The world were safe if but a few
Could grow in grace as Mary Grew!

So, New Year’s Eve, I sit and say,
By this low wood-fire, ashen gray;
Just wishing, as the night shuts down,
That I could hear in Boston town,
In pleasant Chestnut Avenue,
From her own lips, how Mary Grew!

And hear her graceful hostess tell
The silver-voicëd oracle
Who lately through her parlors spoke
As through Dodona’s sacred oak,
A wiser truth than any told
By Sappho’s lips of ruddy gold,—
The way to make the world anew,
Is just to grow—as Mary Grew!

== Personal life ==
Mary Grew and her life partner, Margaret Jones Burleigh, were inseparable beginning in their mid-30s. Their circle of abolitionists included Cyrus M. Burleigh, Mary's co-editor at the Philadelphia Freeman. In 1855, when Cyrus was dying of tuberculosis, Margaret Jones married him.

He died one month later; Margaret settled his affairs and she and Mary went on a tour of New England. Within six months they were signing their letters “Mary & Margaret.” They lived together the rest of their lives.

When Margaret died in 1891, Mary received condolences like a widow. When Mary died in Philadelphia five years later on October 10, 1896, her eulogy described their connection as akin to husband and wife: “They had grown like two noble trees, side by side from youth to age, with roots so interlaced that when the one was uptorn the other could never take quite the same hold on life again.”

Grew became a member of the Unitarian church where she was able to occasionally preach. She also preached at northern New England Free-will Baptists, Methodists and Congregational churches. She was one of the founders of the New Century Club, of Philadelphia.

== Cultural references ==
In 1991, historian Ira Vernon Brown published a biography of Grew.

Mary Grew appears as a character in Ain Gordon's 2013 play If She Stood.
