= Louis Napoleon (disambiguation) =

Louis Napoleon usually refers to Napoleon III (1808–1873), who was Emperor of the Second French Empire from 1852 to 1870, and was known as Louis-Napoleon Bonaparte before 1852.

Louis Napoleon may also refer to:

- Louis Bonaparte or Louis Napoléon Bonaparte (1778–1846), King Louis I of Holland, brother of Napoleon I
- Napoléon Louis Bonaparte (1804–1831), King Louis II of Holland, second son of Louis Bonaparte (1778–1846)
- Napoléon Eugène, Prince Imperial or Napoléon IV, Prince Imperial, often referred to as Louis Napoléon (1856–1879), only child of Napoleon III
- Prince Louis Napoléon or Napoléon VI, Prince Imperial (1914–1997), pretender to the French throne
- Louis Napoleon (underground railroad), associate of Sydney Howard Gay
