= Henry Grew =

American religious writer (1781–1862)

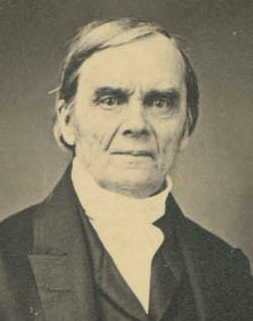
Henry Grew

Henry Grew (1781 – August 8, 1862) was a Christian teacher and writer whose studies of the Bible led him to conclusions which were at odds with doctrines accepted by many of the mainstream churches of his time. Among other things, he rejected the Trinity, immortality of the soul, and a hell of literal eternal torment.

== Life and career ==
Henry Grew was born in Birmingham, England, but at the age of 13, moved with his parents to the United States. His family first lived in Boston. Later Grew lived in Providence, Pawtucket, Hartford, and Philadelphia. He graduated from Brown University.

Grew became a deacon at the First Baptist Church in Providence by age 23, and later became a pastor in Pawtucket. In 1810, he published the first of his writings, on the Book of Matthew. At 30, in 1811, after being pastor for four years at the First Baptist Church in Hartford, his connection was dissolved because ″he adopted sentiments and usages different from those of the church″.

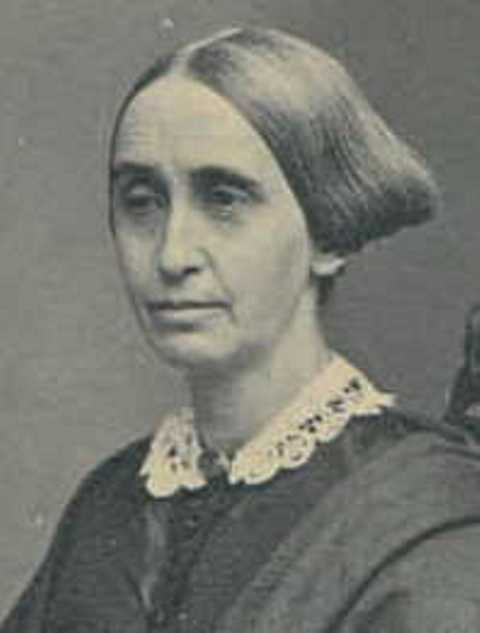
Mary Grew (c.1860)

During the next several decades, Grew served as pastor intermittently, informally, or for relatively small groups.

Early in his career, Grew was involved in the Connecticut Bible Society. In the 1820s, Grew was one of the founding shareholders of Hartford Female Seminary, and in the 1830s there is evidence a Henry Grew was involved in both the 'Hartford Peace Society' and the 'Connecticut Peace Society'. In the 1830s, Grew became involved with the New England Anti-Slavery Society and spoke on their behalf.

Grew was invited to the World Anti-Slavery Convention beginning 12 June 1840 in London. He departed on the ship Roscoe on 7 May 1840. Other delegates aboard the ship besides his daughter, Mary, were James and Lucretia Mott, Emily Winslow and her father Isaac, Abby South and Elizabeth Neall. According to Mrs. Mott, Henry Grew read and preached on the Sabbath, and Mary Grew was "quite intimate" with George Bradburn. After they arrived, Bradburn traveled with the Grews to various locations, including Liverpool and particularly Birmingham, as Mary wanted to see her father's birthplace.

Before and during the convention, there was fierce debate about the participation and seating of women delegates and attendees. Grew sided with the British organisers and spoke in favour of the men's right to exclude women, despite his daughter also being excluded.

In 1854 a similar public debate took place when Grew and Mary attended the fifth annual National Women's Rights Convention in Philadelphia. Grew debated with Lucretia Mott, during which he lauded the supremacy and authority of men.

Grew preached throughout the remainder of his life with a small group of people who shared his religious beliefs. His writings were collected and influenced later religious leaders.

He died in Philadelphia on 8 August 1862, after an illness. He was 80 years of age.

== Legacy ==
The writings of Henry Grew influenced George Storrs, and later, Charles Taze Russell. Henry Grew and George Storrs are both mentioned as noteworthy Bible students in the October 15, 2000 issue of The Watchtower magazine, published by the Watch Tower Bible and Tract Society of Jehovah's Witnesses.

A list of Henry Grew's religious writings includes: Christian Loyalty: A Sermon on Matthew XXII:21, Designed to Illustrate the Authority of Caesar and Jesus Christ (1810), An Examination of the Divine Testimony Concerning the Character of the Son of God (1824), A Tribute to the Memory of the Apostles, and an Exhibition of the First Christian Churches (1836), The Practices of the Early Christians Considered (1838), A Review of Phelps' Argument for the Perpetuity of the Sabbath (1844), The Intermediate State (1849), The Sabbath (1850), An Examination of the Divine Testimony on the Nature and Character of the Son of God (1855), An Appeal to Pious Trinitarians (1857), The Atonement (1859), Divine Dispensations, Past, Present and Future (1861).

== In popular culture ==
- Grew's daughter, Mary, appears as a character in Ain Gordon's 2013 play If She Stood, commissioned by the Painted Bride Art Center in Philadelphia.
