= National Anti-Slavery Standard =

Weekly newspaper of the American Anti-Slavery Society

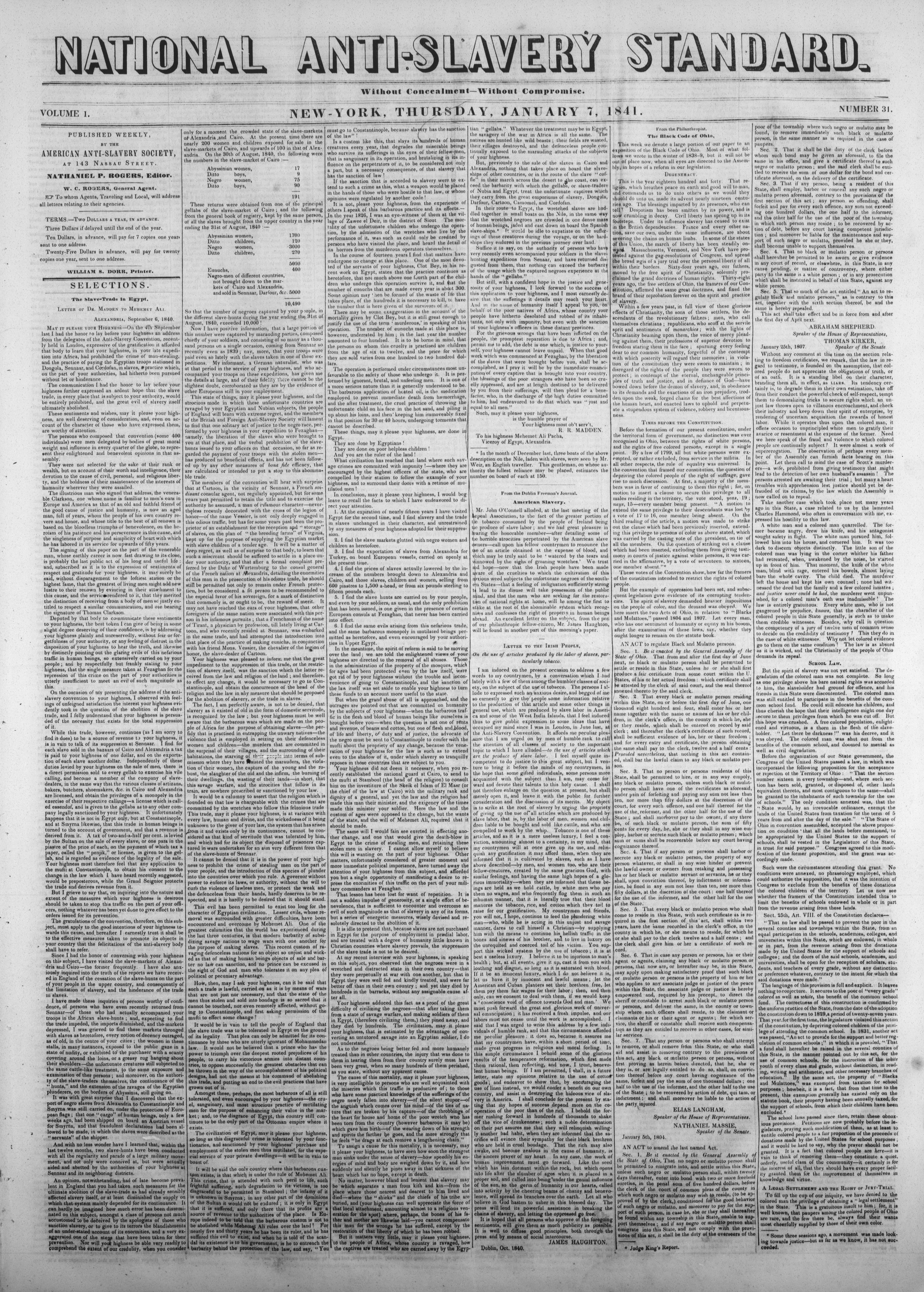
January 7, 1841 edition

The National Anti-Slavery Standard was the official weekly newspaper of the American Anti-Slavery Society, published in New York from 1840 to 1870. It was first edited by N.P Roger, before later being edited by Lydia M. Child, David Lee Child, Sydney Howard Gay, Oliver Johnson, and Aaron M. Powell. The newspaper carried the motto "Without concealment—Without compromise" and it was published concurrently in New York and Philadelphia from July 22,1855 to November 30,1865. The paper was published continuously until the ratification of the Fifteenth Amendment to the United States Constitution in 1870.

== History ==
The Standard was a weekly newspaper that was published concurrently in New York City and Philadelphia (1854–1865). It published the essays, debates, speeches, events, reports, and anything newsworthy that related to the question of slavery in the United States and other parts of the world. Its audience were the members of the American Anti-Slavery Society and abolitionists in the north. It began being published during a time that the American Anti-Slavery Society was torn over tactics of how to go about emancipation.

When Lydia Maria Child took over as editor's position in 1841, the publication began to take a more comprehensive approach to its editorials, which would reach a wider audience than just abolitionists. The, "National Anti-Slavery Standard" was a publication that featured antislavery information essays, sketches, and other pieces. Child described the paper as a "medium of communication with the people," rather than only a newspaper for readers already committed to reform.

Further documents have established that the "National Anti-Slavery Standard" was produced by the American Anti-Slavery Society in New York between 1840 and 1870. Moreover, this journal ran from July 22, 1855, until November 30, 1865, in Philadelphia as well.

Library records indicate that the newspaper was produced using the six-column format, and its motto was "Without Concealment-Without Compromise."

Based on surviving issues of the paper, it seems that the paper included information relating to abolitionism, suffrage, and equality.

It is among the longest-running abolitionist newspaper affiliated with the American Anti-Slavery Society.

== Content ==
From the remaining copies of the "National Anti-Slavery Standard," it is clear that the newspaper focused on issues related to abolitionism, suffrage, and equality in general.

The Newspaper was, indeed, the official publication of the American Anti-Slavery Society.

== Lydia Maria Child's editorship ==
Lydia Maria Child was appointed as the editor of the National Anti-Slavery Standard in 1841. She remained as editor until 1843. According to Journalism historian Liz Watts, Child was the first women in America to edit a newspaper with a focus on influencing public policy. She took over at a time when the American Anti-slavery Society was experiencing internal conflict and the paper's subscriptions were dwindling. Rather than making the paper more radical, Child attempted to make it more appealing to readers who were not within the mainstream of the abolition movement.

As editor, Child emphasized objectivity. rejected sensationalism, and tried to create a publication that could reach a wider audience. She added essays, sketches, literary material, and social commentary alongside political news, believing that a newspaper devoted only to politics would not attract enough readers. She also tried to avoid sectarian bias and opposed the harsh inflammatory tone favored by some abolitionists. In her view, the paper should serve as a, "medium of communication with the people, " not simply as a paper for readers who were already committed reformers.

One of the most significant contributions made by Child was the "Letters from New-York" column, in which she wrote, "about the city, religion, poverty, women, and popular culture, but always in a manner that linked them to the antislavery movement." This column gave the paper a more personal and literary voice and generated much interest. During Child's time, the paper's readership grew from 2,500 to 5,000. When she left the paper in 1843, the readership fell to a mere fraction, implying that her contribution had been instrumental in the growth in readership.

== American Anti-Slavery Society ==
The newspaper's founder, the American Anti-Slavery Society, was founded in 1833 to spread their movement across the nation with printed materials. The National Anti-Slavery Standard and The Liberator became the official newspapers of the society. The paper featured writings from influential abolitionists fighting for suffrage, equality, and most of all emancipation. One activist that was featured most was Charles Lenox Remond, a free elite African American minister who traveled the country speaking out against slavery. Other abolitionists included Frederick Douglass who gave powerful antislavery testimonies.

== Editors ==
The paper had various editors: N. P. Rogers, 1840–1841; Lydia Maria Child, 1841–1843; D. L. Child, 1843–1844; S. H. Gay, 1844–1854; Oliver Johnson, 1863–1865; A. M. Powell, 1866-1870.

Lydia Maria Child was also the editor of Harriet Jacobs' Incidents in the Life of a Slave Girl, reviewed in the edition of February 23, 1861, which is now widely regarded as an American classic.

The newspaper had several successive editors who were abolitionists during its period of publication spanning thirty years. From the library information, it can be observed that the editors of the newspaper include N.P Rogers, Lydia M. Child, David Lee Child, Sydney Howard Gay, Oliver Johnson, and Aaron M. Powell. The above editors represent the several stage in which the newspaper existed through during the period of the antislavery movement.

== Publication details ==
The "National Anti-Slavery Standard" was a weekly publication produced by the American Anti-Slavery society from 1840 to 1870 in New York, Between July 22, 1855, and November 30,1865, there was another simultaneous publication of the same periodical in Philadelphia, Pennsylvania. The library notes provide information about the newspaper being a six-column publication with the slogan, "Without concealment- Without compromise." Additionally, issues from June 9,1842 till 1870 were numbered in whole figures ranging from 105 to 1,558.

== Related papers ==
From May to July 1870, the paper's title changed to Standard: A Journal of Reform and Literature. Then from July 30, 1870, to December 23, 1871, it ran as the National Standard: An Independent Reform and Literary Journal. After the ratification of the fifteenth amendment, the paper changed its title from The National Anti-Slavery Standard to The National Standard: A Temperance and Literary Journal from January to December in 1872. The motto changed to An Independent, Reform and Literary Journal Justice and Equal Rights for All.

After 1870, the title of the publication was changed. In May of 1870, its publication started under the name "The Standard: A Journal of Reform and Literature." It kept the same title to no. 3 of July 1870. From the "Union List of Serials," it could be known that it replaced "National Anti-Slavery Standard," which used to publish from 1840 until April 1870. It then continued under the title National Standard through December 1872.

== Legacy ==
However, the "National Anti-Slavery Standard" continued publication for thirty years and thus was among the longest running paper of the American Anti-Slavery Society.

Moreover, the continuation of the paper under the new names after 1870 indicated that it had broader agenda than the fight against slavery.

Its longevity attest to its significance in abolitionist print culture and how reform literature has persisted as an influence in shaping public discourse through several generations.

== See also ==
- Abolitionist publications
