= American Female Anti-Slavery Society =

The American Female Anti-Slavery Society held its first meeting in May of 1837, in New York City. Seventy-one delegates attended. The Grimké sisters represented South Carolina, along with Lucretia Mott and other Philadelphians, and many Boston delegates. The Grimké sisters introduced a resolution calling for race prejudice to be fought in the North as well as the South. The meeting vowed to work against the gag rule, which prohibited petitions to Congress. The meeting also released a new treatise by Angelina Grimké, An Appeal to the Women of Nominally Free States.

The Society was intended to sponsor talks in women's private homes.
