= Sydney Howard Gay =

American attorney, journalist and abolitionist

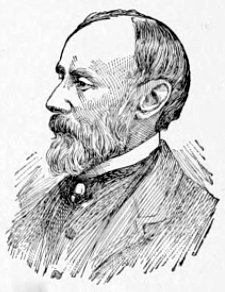
- Born: May 22, 1814; Hingham, Massachusetts
- Died: June 25, 1888 (aged 74); New Brighton, Staten Island
- Occupations: Lawyer, journalist
- Spouse: Elizabeth Johns Neall (m. 1845)
- Children: Mary Otis Gay Willcox

Sydney Howard Gay (1814–1888) was an American attorney, journalist and abolitionist who was active in New York City. Beginning in 1843, he was editor of the National Anti-Slavery Standard for 14 years. His offices became a stop of the Underground Railroad, and he became very active in collaborating with others to help fugitive slaves reach freedom.

He worked closely with Louis Napoleon, a free black man. For about two years, Gay kept a detailed record of the approximately 200 men whom he and Napoleon aided in what is known as the Record of Fugitives. Because Gay aided men coming from Philadelphia, some of his notes overlap materials by activist William Still of that city, who published his account in 1872.

Gay's Record was not discovered among his papers at Columbia University until the early 21st century. Gay and Napoleon may have aided an estimated 3,000 refugees, helping many get to upstate New York and Canada. His Record reveals what a large organization the Underground Railroad truly was, aided by hundreds of people from different walks of life.

== Early life ==
Gay was born on May 22, 1814, in Hingham, Massachusetts, to the lawyer Ebenezer Gay and his wife Mary Alleyne Otis, niece of American Revolutionary activists James Otis, Jr. and Mercy Otis Warren. On his father's side, he was descended from Governor William Bradford, a founder of the Plymouth Colony, who arrived on the Mayflower in 1620. On his mother's side, he was descended from John Otis, who settled in Hingham in 1635.

Sydney's father, Ebenezer Gay, was a prosperous but unhappy attorney who wanted one of his sons to join his practice. Sydney's older brothers did not meet Ebenezer's expectations, so he decided to prepare Sydney for a legal career by sending him to Harvard College. But Sydney was 15 years old and could not adjust yet to being away from home. He became ill and had to withdraw from his classes. Ebenezer was disappointed when Sydney refused to return to the college.

Gay set his sights on being a businessman and persuaded his father to loan him money for several unsuccessful business ventures. While he was trying desperately to start a mercantile enterprise in New Orleans, his sister, Francis, informed him that Angelina Grimké had spoken in Hingham against slavery, and she had greatly impressed their mother. Gay told his sister that abolitionists were fanatics, and he did not want anyone in the family to associate with them.

When his New Orleans venture failed miserably, Gay returned to his parents' home, ill and ashamed. Withdrawing into his father's library, he read and thought deeply about the slavery issue; he changed his opinion, announcing that he was an abolitionist. His father still hoped the younger Gay would join his law practice, but he refused to take the lawyer's oath to uphold the United States Constitution, because the Constitution sanctioned slavery.

Gay joined the local Antislavery Society. In addition, he started writing abolitionist articles for the Hingham Patriot, joined William Lloyd Garrison's American Abolition Society, and traveled on a One Hundred Convention tour with Frederick Douglass, a prominent abolitionist who had escaped from slavery when young.

== Life in New York City ==
In 1843, Gay moved to New York City to become resident editor of the National Anti-Slavery Standard, a post he would hold for 14 years.

Two years later in 1845, Gay married Elizabeth Johns Neall, the grandchild of abolitionist Warner Mifflin and daughter of another prominent Quaker abolitionist, Daniel Neall, president of Pennsylvania Hall. Neall was also an abolitionist and involved in the woman's rights movement of the day. Their daughter Mary Otis Gay Willcox became a prominent civic worker on Staten Island.

== Abolition and the Underground Railroad ==
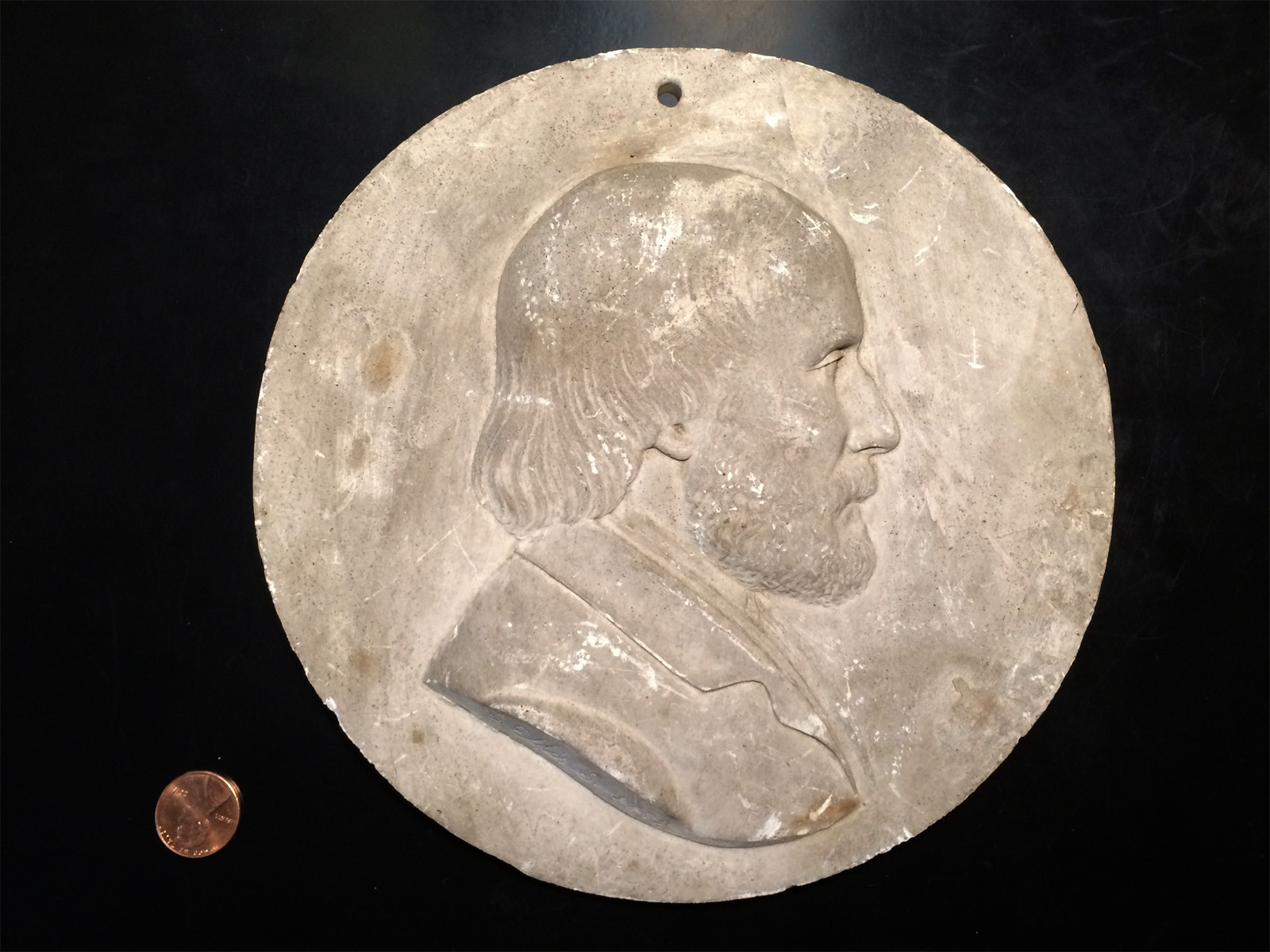
Bas relief of Sydney Howard Gay by Salathiel Ellis, 1865

Several people helped Gay make his office at the Standard one of New York City's busiest Underground Railroad depots. His associates included the venerable abolitionist Quaker Isaac T. Hopper, his daughter, Abigail Hopper Gibbons, and her husband, James; Elias Smith; and two African Americans: the Standard's printer, William H. Leonard, and Louis Napoleon, who conducted many of the fugitives forwarded to the office from Philadelphia by James Miller McKim and William Still.

Gay's office was a critical stop for refugees traveling from Philadelphia to New Haven and Boston, or to Canada West via Albany, Syracuse, and Rochester.

Gay aided three of history's most famous fugitives: Henry "Box" Brown, Jane Johnson, and Harriet Tubman. In two notebooks, which he entitled Record of Fugitives, 1855—, he recorded the stories of over 200 fugitives whom he and his associates aided from 1855 to 1856. Because Gay dealt with some refugees who came from Philadelphia, where William Still kept his own notes about some of the same people, Gay's Record is the most important primary document to be printed since William Still self-published his classic Underground Railroad Records in 1872.

The contents of Gay's Record were similar to the journal kept by Still. But, Gay's Record was not discovered by historians until the 21st century. The earliest-known documented reference to it was made by historian Kathryn Grover in her 2002 monograph about black abolitionists in Boston for the National Park Service. Tom Calarco, one of the authors of Secret Lives, found the Records as a result of this reference. He had the materials photographed in 2007 for use in research. He immediately realized the significance of the Records, and collaborated with Don Papson on a book resulting from their study of these and other documents. It was published in February 2015.

Around that time, historians of slavery such as Eric Foner also learned of the Records. A copy of his annotated Record of Fugitive Slaves is available for viewing online at the Columbia University Library website. Foner also wrote a history of the Underground Railroad, Gateway to Freedom: The Hidden History of the Underground Railroad (2015). He estimated that Gay and his collaborators in New York aided some 3,000 fugitive slaves in reaching freedom.

== Career as a journalist ==
After 14 years at the Standard, Gay resigned when the Boston clique decided it could not afford to keep his associate editor, Oliver Johnson. Gay was exhausted, and he was not earning enough to support his wife and three children. He continued to serve on the American Anti-Slavery Society's Executive Board and to aid fugitives from slavery.

Following time off to recover his health at his home on Staten Island, Gay accepted the position of assistant to the managing editor, and later the managing editor, for Horace Greeley's New-York Tribune. Although Greeley unrelentingly criticized President Lincoln's handling of the Civil War, Gay ensured the Tribune was a pro-Union paper. Gay defied Greeley's command against arming staff at the Tribune building during the 1863 Draft Riots, and they were able to prevent a mob from burning it to the ground.

When Greeley demoted Gay after the war, he resigned. Gay was emotionally and physically exhausted. After a long rest in Hingham, he accepted a job at the Chicago Tribune in 1867. He lived and worked there until after the Great Chicago Fire of 1871.

Gay returned to New York, serving on the editorial staff of William Cullen Bryant's New York Evening Post from 1872 to 1874. Bryant persuaded him to collaborate on a multi-volume Popular History of the United States for Scribners, and Gay did most of the writing for it.

== Final years ==
In 1877, Harvard's president and Fellows recognized Gay's accomplishments by awarding him a diploma.

Gay was elected a member of the American Antiquarian Society in 1878.

In 1884, Gay completed A Life of James Madison. He was working on a biography of John Quincy, his Boston abolitionist friend, when he fell, injuring his spine so as to cause paralysis. He died in New Brighton, Staten Island on June 25, 1888, and was buried in the Hingham Cemetery with his ancestors. It is located on the hill above the Old Ship Church, which his paternal great-grandfather, Rev. Ebenezer Gay, had pastored for more than 60 years.

His papers are held as the Gay Papers at the Rare Book & Manuscript Library of Columbia University. This is where his Record of Fugitives was found in the early 21st century. Two books based on it were published in 2015.
