= World Anti-Slavery Convention =

1840 abolitionist convention

1840 World Anti-Slavery Convention. Each face is linked to the individual's article.

The World Anti-Slavery Convention met for the first time at Freemasons' Tavern in London, on 12–23 June 1840. It was organised by the British and Foreign Anti-Slavery Society, largely on the initiative of the English Quaker Joseph Sturge. The exclusion of women from the convention gave a great impetus to the women's suffrage movement in the United States.

== Background ==
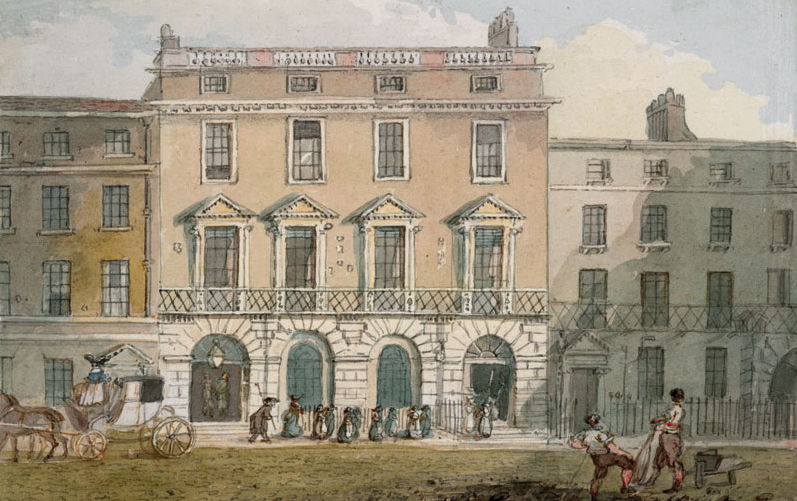
Watercolour of the Freemasons' Tavern by John Nixon circa 1800

The Society for the Abolition of the Slave Trade (officially Society for Effecting the Abolition of the Slave Trade) was principally a Quaker society founded in 1787 by 12 men, nine of whom were Quakers and three Anglicans, one of whom was Thomas Clarkson. Due to their efforts, the international slave trade was abolished throughout the British Empire with the passing of the Slave Trade Act 1807. The Society for the Mitigation and Gradual Abolition of Slavery Throughout the British Dominions, in existence from 1823 to 1838, helped to bring about the Slavery Abolition Act 1833, advocated by William Wilberforce, which abolished slavery in the British Empire from August 1834, when some 800,000 people in the British empire became free.

Similarly, in the 1830s many women and men in America acted on their religious convictions and moral outrage to become a part of the abolitionist movement. Many women in particular responded to Wm. Lloyd Garrison's invitation to become involved in the American Anti-Slavery Society. They were heavily involved, attending meetings and writing petitions. Arthur Tappan and other conservative members of the society objected to women engaging in politics publicly.

Given the perceived need for a society to campaign for anti-slavery worldwide, the British and Foreign Anti-Slavery Society (BFASS) was accordingly founded in 1839. One of its first significant deeds was to organise the World Anti-Slavery Convention in 1840: "Our expectations, we confess, were high, and the reality did not disappoint them." The preparations for this event had begun in 1839, when the Society circulated an advertisement inviting delegates to participate in the convention. Over 200 of the official delegates were British. The next largest group was the Americans, with around 50 delegates. Only small numbers of delegates from other nations attended.

Benjamin Robert Haydon painted The Anti-Slavery Society Convention, 1840, a year after the event that today is in the National Portrait Gallery. This very large and detailed work shows Alexander as Treasurer of the new Society. The painting portrays the 1840 meeting and was completed the next year. The new society's mission was "The universal extinction of slavery and the slave trade and the protection of the rights and interests of the enfranchised population in the British possessions and of all persons captured as slaves."

== Question of women's participation ==
The circular message, distributed in 1839, provoked a controversial response from some American opponents of slavery. The Garrisonian faction supported the participation of women in the anti-slavery movement. They were opposed by the supporters of Arthur and Lewis Tappan. When the latter group sent a message to the BFASS opposing the inclusion of women, a second circular was issued in February 1840 which explicitly stated that the meeting was limited to "gentlemen".

Despite the statement that women would not be admitted, many American and British female abolitionists, including Lucretia Mott, Elizabeth Cady Stanton, and Lady Byron, appeared at the World Anti-Slavery Convention in London. The American Anti-Slavery Society, the Garrisonian faction, made a point to include a woman, Lucretia Mott, and an African American, Charles Lenox Remond, in their delegation. Both the Massachusetts and Pennsylvania Anti-Slavery Societies sent women members as their delegates, including Abigail Kimber, Elizabeth Neall, Mary Grew, and Sarah Pugh. Cady Stanton was not herself a delegate; she was in England on her honeymoon, accompanying her husband Henry Brewster Stanton, who was a delegate. (Notably, he was aligned with the American faction that opposed women's equality.) Wendell Phillips proposed that female delegates should be admitted, and much of the first day of the convention was devoted to discussing whether they should be allowed to participate. Published reports from the convention noted "The upper end and one side of the room were appropriated to ladies, of whom a considerable number were present, including several female abolitionists from the United States." The women were allowed to watch and listen from the spectators gallery but could not take part.

In sympathy with the excluded women, the Americans William Garrison, Charles Lenox Remond, Nathaniel P. Rogers, and William Adams refused to take their seat as delegates as well, and joined the women in the spectators' gallery.

Lucretia Mott and Elizabeth Cady Stanton, who eight years later organized the Seneca Falls Convention, met at this convention.

== Proceedings (incomplete) ==
The convention's organising committee had asked the Reverend Benjamin Godwin to prepare a paper on the ethics of slavery. The convention unanimously accepted his paper, which condemned not just slavery but also the world's religious leaders and every community who had failed to condemn the practice. The convention resolved to write to every religious leader to share this view. The convention called on all religious communities to eject any supporters of slavery from their midst.

George William Alexander reported on his visits in 1839, with James Whitehorn, to Sweden and the Netherlands to discuss the conditions of slaves in the Dutch colonies and in Suriname. In Suriname, he reported, there were over 100,000 slaves with an annual attrition rate of twenty per cent. The convention prepared open letters of protest to the respective sovereigns.

Joseph Pease spoke and accused the British government of being complicit in the continuing existence of slavery in India.

== Legacy ==
After leaving the convention on the first day, being denied full access to the proceedings, Lucretia Mott and Elizabeth Cady Stanton "walked home arm in arm, commenting on the incidents of the day, [and] we resolved to hold a convention as soon as we returned home, and form a society to advocate the rights of women." Eight years later they hosted the Seneca Falls Convention in Seneca Falls, New York.

One hundred years later, the Women's Centennial Congress was held in America to celebrate the progress that women had made since they were prevented from speaking at this conference.

== Incomplete list of delegates (and women who attended) ==
The official list of delegates has 493 names.

Delegate	Country	In painting?	Comments
Prof William Adam	UK	very top right	Professor
Edward Adey	UK	very far right	Baptist Minister
George William Alexander	UK	left	Financier
Richard Allen	Ireland	right	Philanthropist
Stafford Allen	UK	left mid	Philanthropist
William Allen	UK	front mid left	Scientist
Sir Edward Baines	UK	left	Member of Parliament
Edward Baldwin	UK	right front	Former Attorney-General of New South Wales
Saxe Bannister	UK	right	Pamphleteer
Edward (Jonas) Barrett	US	far right	Former slave
Richard Barrett	Jamaica	very far right	
Isaac Bass	UK	far right	
Henry Beckford	Jamaica	front centre	Former Slave and Jamaican deacon
Abraham Beaumont	UK	left	
Mrs John Beaumont	UK	front far right	
William Beaumont	UK	left	
George Bennett	UK	right front	
Rev. Dr. Thomas Binney	UK	far right	Minister
James Gillespie Birney	US	left	Attorney
John Birt	US	back far right	
Jonathan Backhouse	UK	left	Banker
W. T. Blair	UK	mid	
William Boulbee	UK	far right	
Samuel Bowly	UK	far left back	Advocate
George Bradburn	US	left	Minister
William Brock	UK	right of centre	Minister
John Burnet	UK	mid	Minister
Anne Isabella, Lady Byron	UK	bonneted far right	
Tapper Cadbury	UK	right back row	Businessman
Mary Clarkson	UK	bonnet left	Speaker's daughter in law
Thomas Clarkson	UK	main speaker	Abolitionist Speaker
Nathaniel Colver	US	right	Minister
Josiah Conder	UK	?	Author
Daniel O'Connell	Ireland	far left	Member of Parliament
Francis Augustus Cox	UK	left	Minister
Isaac Crewdson	UK	back row	Minister
John Cropper	UK	right front	Philanthropist
William Dawes	US	far left	education
James Dean	US?	?	Professor
Sir John Eardley-Wilmot, 1st Baronet	UK	mid left	Member of Parliament
Joseph Eaton	UK	?	
John Ellis	UK	far right	Member of Parliament
William Forster	UK	front	Minister
Josiah Forster	UK	front mid right	Philanthropist
Wm. Lloyd Garrison	US	no	Journalist, publisher. Voluntarily sat with the women.
Samuel Gurney	UK	under speaker	Banker
George Head Head	UK	Front right	Banker
François-André Isambert	France	mid	Lawyer
Rev. John Keep	US	?	Minister; trustee of Oberlin College
William Knibb	Jamaica	front mid right	Minister
Samuel Jackman Prescod	Barbados	front middle	Journalist
William Morgan	UK	middle front	Lawyer
William Harris Murch	UK	yes	Minister
John Scoble	UK	front right	Lawyer; later Canada Member of Parliament
Joseph Ketley	Guyana	front right	Minister
George Stacey	UK	front	Minister
George Thompson	UK & US	front mid right	Member of Parliament
J. Harfield Tredgold	South Africa	under speaker	Chemist
Stephen Lushington	UK	left	Member of Parliament
Sir Thomas Fowell Buxton, 1st Baronet	UK	left	Member of Parliament
Benjamin Godwin	UK	mid	Minister
Vice Admiral Constantine Richard Moorsom	UK	left	Royal Navy Officer
William Taylor	UK	mid	
John Morrison	UK	mid	
Dr George Prince	UK	?	
Joseph Soul	UK	???	Reformer
Joseph Sturge	UK	left front	Minister
James Whitehorne	Jamaica	?	
Joseph Marriage	UK	left front	
William Leatham	UK	left	Banker
Samuel Lucas	UK	left	Journalist
Samuel Fox	UK	left back	
Louis Celeste Lecesne	UK	left back	
Robert Greville	UK	far left	Botanist
Joseph Pease	UK	left	Minister
William Tatum	UK	right	
Richard D. Webb	Ireland	right	Publisher
Rev. Thomas Scales	UK	right front	Minister
William James	UK	right	Minister
William Wilson	UK	right	
Rev. Thomas Swan	UK	right	Baptist Minister
Rev. Edward Steane	UK	right	Minister
Colonel Jonathon Miller	US	right front	United States Army Officer
Captain Charles Stuart	Jamaica	right	Royal Navy Officer
Sir John Jeremie	Colonies	right of centre	Judge
Charles Stovel	UK	far right front	Minister
Richard Peek	UK	far right front	Sheriff of London
John Sturge	UK	far right	Organiser's brother
Robert Forster	UK	very far right	Philanthropist
Elon Galusha	US	right	Lawyer
Cyrus Pitt Grosvenor	US	far right	Minister
Henry Sterry (committee)	UK	far right	
Peter Clare	UK	far right	
Rev. J.H. Johnson	UK	far right	
Dr. Thomas Price	UK	far right	
Joseph Reynolds	UK	far right	
Samuel Wheeler	UK	far right	
Wiliam Fairbank	UK	far right	
Rev. John Woodmark	UK	far right	
William Smeal	UK	far right	Minister
James Carlile	Ireland	far right	Minister
John Howard Hinton	UK	far right	Minister
John Angell James	Ireland	far right	Minister
Joseph Cooper	UK	far right	
Dr. Richard Robert Madden	Ireland/ Jamaica	far right	Doctor
Alderman Thomas Bulley	UK	far right	
Isaac Hodgson	UK	far right	
Edward Smith	UK	far right	
Sir John Bowring	UK	far right	Member of Parliament
Anne Knight	UK	bonneted far right	Wright
C. Edwards Lester	US	far right	Writer
Thomas Pinches	?	far right	
David Turnbull	UK	far right	Author
John Steer	UK	very far right	
Henry Tuckett	UK	very far right	
James Mott	US	very far right	Merchant
Richard Rathbone	UK	very far right	Businessman
Wendell Phillips	US	very far right	Attorney
M. L'Instant	Haiti	front far right	Jean-Baptiste Symphor Linstant de Pradine (1812-1883)
Henry Stanton	US	front far right	Attorney
Mrs Elizabeth Tredgold	South African	back row right	
T.M. McDonnell	UK	very far right	Minister
Mary Anne Rawson	UK	far right	
Elizabeth Pease	UK	very far right	Suffragist
Jacob Post	UK	very far right	Minister
Amelia Opie	UK	front far right	Novelist
Rev. Thomas Morgan	UK	mid right	Minister
Elizabeth Cady Stanton	US	No	married to Henry Stanton
Elizabeth Jesser Reid	??	No	UK philanthropist
Norton Strange Townshend	US	No	Doctor
Rev. A Harvey	UK	No	Minister
Mary Grew	US	No	US delegate (refused a main seat)
Lucretia Mott	US	No	(refused a main seat)
Eliza Wigham	UK	No	Scottish leader (refused a main seat)
Abby Southwick	US	No	(refused a main seat)
Henry Grew	US	No	Teacher
Elizabeth Ann Ashurst Bardonneau	UK	No	
William H. Ashurst	UK	No	Solicitor
Sir George Strickland, 7th Baronet	UK	No	Member of Parliament
Thomas Hodgkin	UK	No	Doctor
William Busfield	UK	No	Member of Parliament
Ellis Cunliffe Lister	UK	No	Member of Parliament
Gerrit Smith	UK	No	Philanthropist
James Canning Fuller	US	No	
Samuel Joseph May	US	No	Minister
John Greenleaf Whittier	US	No	Poet
Cornelius Manning	UK	No	Philanthropist
Charles Pelham Villiers	UK	No	Member of Parliament
Matilda Ashurst Biggs	UK	No	
Lucy Townsend	UK	No	
Elizabeth Neall	US	No	
Ann Terry Greene Phillips	US	No	
Charles Lenox Remond	US	No	Free man
Nathaniel Peabody Rogers	US	No	Publisher
Benjamin Barron Wiffen	UK	No	Businessman
Emily Winslow	US	No	
Isaac Winslow	US	No	Politician
