= Anne Warren Weston =

American abolitionist

- Born: July 13, 1812
- Died: 1890 (aged 77–78)
- Occupation: Abolitionist

Anne Warren Weston (July 13, 1812 – 1890) was an American abolitionist. She is largely memorialized by the letters she wrote to the Boston Female Anti-Slavery Society, and others.

== Biography ==
=== Early life ===
Anne Warren Weston was born in Weymouth, Massachusetts on July 13, 1812.

=== Expanded description ===
Weston wrote letters to the Boston Female Anti-Slavery Society, detailing the expectations and persecution of abolitionism. She gave a circular to the Abolitionists of Massachusetts.

=== Death and afterward ===
Weston died in 1890.

== Philosophical and political views ==
In her Circular to Abolitionists of Massachusetts, Weston lays out a set of guidelines for the Anti-Slavery Society to carry forth their goals, including having men and women sign separate documents and sending all signed memorials to the legislature. She cites the Preamble to the United States Constitution as evidence that the legislation of Massachusetts is hypocritical in their refusal to provide life, liberty, and the pursuit of happiness to a portion of the population.

== Bibliography ==
1. "Anne Warren Weston." Women in Peace.
2. Weston, Anne Warren. Letter from Anne Warren Weston to Boston Female Anti-Slavery Society.
3. Weston, Anne Warren. Circular to Abolitionists of Massachusetts.

== See also ==
- Boston Female Anti-Slavery Society
