= Sarah Pugh =

American abolitionist, activist, and teacher

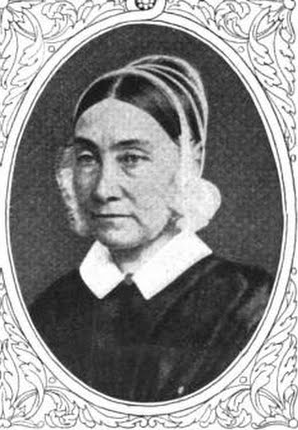
Sarah Pugh, from a 1910 publication.

Sarah Pugh (6 October 1800 – 1 August 1884) was an American abolitionist, activist, suffragist, and teacher. She was involved with promoting the free produce movement, including a boycott on sugar produced by slave labor. She was a leader of the Philadelphia Female Anti-Slavery Society from its earliest days in 1835 until it closed in 1870. Along with Lucretia Mott, Pugh was one of the delegates to the World Anti-Slavery Convention in London who were denied their seats because they were women.

== Early life ==
Pugh was born in Alexandria, Virginia in 1800 to Jesse and Catherine (Jackson) Pugh. Her parents were Quakers, and her grandfather was an active abolitionist. When her father died when she was three, her family moved to Chester County, Pennsylvania, and a few years later to Philadelphia, where Pugh's mother and aunt established a dressmaking business.

Pugh attended Westtown Boarding School for two years, starting at age 12. In 1821, she began teaching at the Friends School of the 12th Street Meeting. She remained there until 1828, when the Quakers split into factions. Pugh resigned her position, ultimately adopting a Unitarian belief. With her friend, Rachel Peirce, she started her own school in 1829.

== Activism ==
In 1835, Pugh became involved in the abolitionist movement after hearing a speech given by George Thompson. When the American Anti-Slavery Society was founded in December 1833, women were present but not included as founders. The American Anti-Slavery Society's founding convention called for the creation of more women's groups. Thus, they created the Philadelphia Female Anti-Slavery Society three days later, on December 9, 1833. A group of 14 women, white and Black, wrote the Society's founding constitution. Pugh joined the group in 1835 and remained a mainstay of its activities until the group ceased operation in 1870, after the ratification of the 15th Amendment. For 35 years Pugh lectured and taught about abolitionist organizing, petitioned Congress, and fundraised. A doer, not a strategist, Pugh led the annual craft fair that raised substantial funds for Pennsylvania's abolitionists.

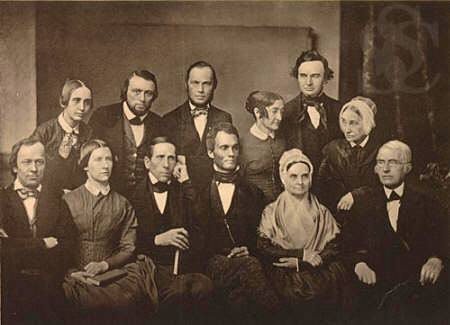
Back row, from left to right, are Mary Grew, E. M. Davis, Haworth Wetherald, Abby Kimber, J. Miller McKim, and Sarah Pugh. Front row, from left to right, are Oliver Johnson, Mrs. Margaret Jones Burleigh, Benjamin C. Bacon, Robert Purvis, Lucretia Mott, and James Mott.

Pugh was also active in other anti-slavery organizations. She was a delegate to the first meeting of the American Women's Anti-slavery Convention and a member of the American Anti-slavery Society, which had been formed in Philadelphia in 1833. She also served as treasurer of the Pennsylvania Anti-Slavery Society from 1843 to 1860. From 1856 to 1864, the Pennsylvania Anti-Slavery Society's executive committee met in the home that Pugh shared with Sarah Lewis, Abby Kimber, Martha Kimber, and Alice Lewis.

In May 1838, Pugh attended the second Anti-Slavery Convention of American Women. The convention was held in Pennsylvania Hall, the newly built abolitionist headquarters in Philadelphia. On May 17, a mob of people who supported slavery burned down the building. The women who were inside, including Sarah Pugh, escaped the building in pairs—one black woman and one white woman, arm-in-arm. This baffled the onlookers, who were distracted by the show of solidarity long enough for all the women to escape the burning building. The next day, the mob returned and burned down the building. The abolitionist convention continued, however, at Sarah Pugh's school.

In June 1840, Pugh was chosen as a delegate to attend the World Anti-Slavery Convention in London, along with Mott, Mary Grew, Elizabeth Neall, and Abby Kimber. The committee declined to recognize the American women as delegates, admitting them only as spectators, and Pugh authored a protest statement, on behalf of the delegates. In the 1850s, she traveled around with Lucretia Mott to attend women's rights conventions. In 1851, Pugh returned to England and spoke about the American abolitionist movement.

After the Civil War, Pugh supported schools for now-freed slaves and their children. After the war she became more involved in women's rights, the women's suffrage movement, which grew out of abolitionism. In 1876, she signed the Declaration of Rights for Women, a protest of the National Woman Suffrage Association at the Centennial Exposition, the first World's Fair in the United States. She became involved with the Moral Education Society, an organization that worked to decriminalize prostitution. She continued her activism until her death in 1884.
