= Lucretia Mott =

American Quaker abolitionist and suffragist (1793–1880)

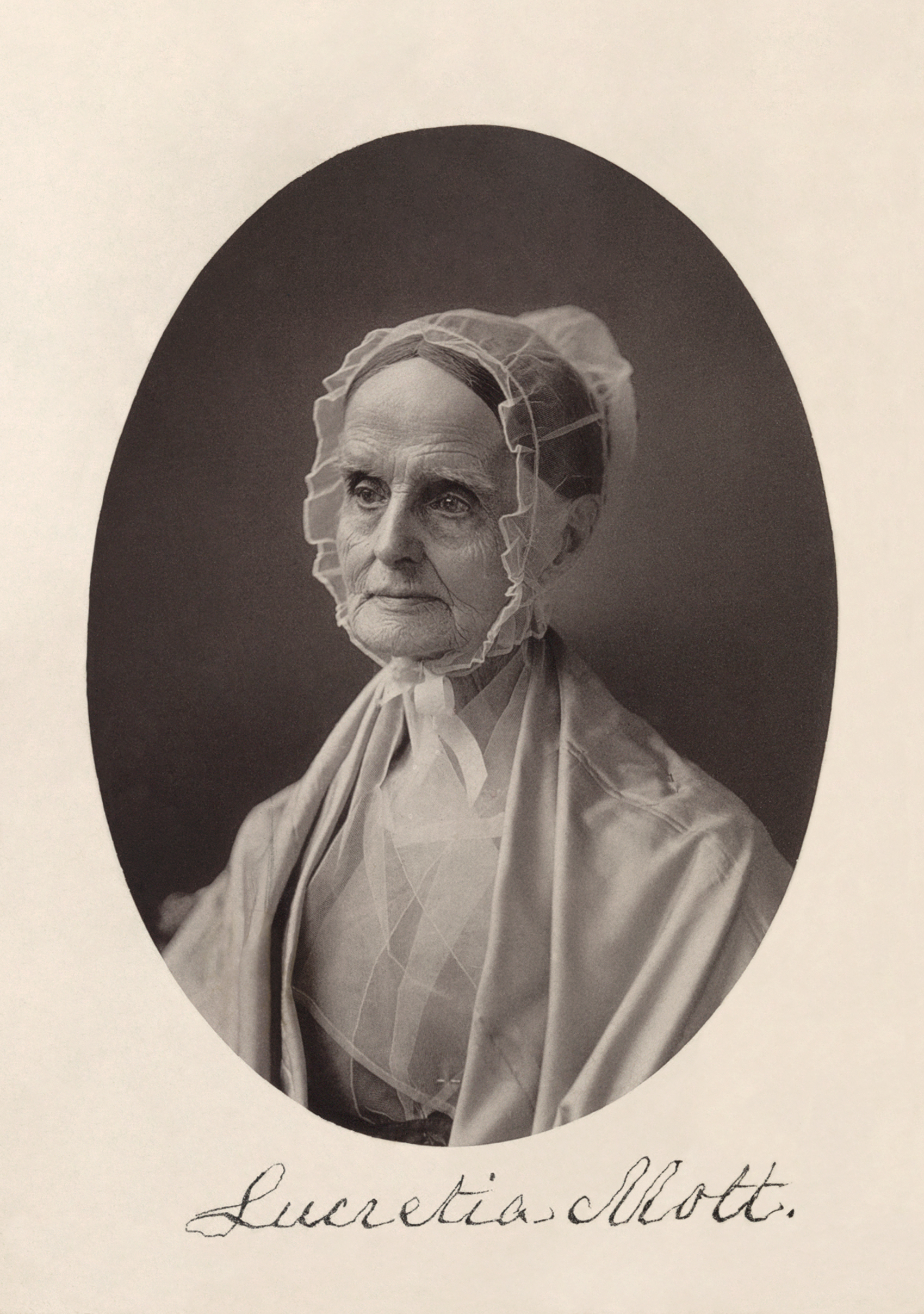
- Signed portrait, c. 1870-1880
- Born: Lucretia Coffin; January 3, 1793; Nantucket, Massachusetts, U.S.
- Died: November 11, 1880 (aged 87); La Mott, Cheltenham, Pennsylvania, U.S.
- Occupations: Abolitionist; suffragist; teacher
- Spouse: James Mott (m. 1811; died 1868)
- Children: 6
- Relatives: Martha Coffin Wright (sister); Eliza Wright Osborne (niece); Mayhew Folger (maternal uncle); Levi Coffin (cousin)

Lucretia Mott (born Coffin; January 3, 1793 – November 11, 1880) was an American Quaker, abolitionist, women's rights activist, and social reformer. She had formed the idea of reforming the position of women in society when she was amongst the women excluded from the World Anti-Slavery Convention held in London in 1840. In 1848, she was invited by Jane Hunt to a meeting that led to the first public gathering about women's rights, the Seneca Falls Convention, during which the Declaration of Sentiments was written.

Her speaking abilities made her an important abolitionist, feminist, and reformer; she had been a Quaker preacher early in her adulthood. She advocated giving black people, both male and female, the right to vote (suffrage). Her home, with husband the Quaker leader James Mott was a stop on the Underground Railroad. Mott helped found the Female Medical College of Pennsylvania and Swarthmore College and raised funds for the Philadelphia School of Design for Women. She remained a central figure in reform movements until her death in 1880. The area around her long-time residence in Cheltenham Township is now known as La Mott, in her honor.

== Early life and education ==
Lucretia Coffin was born January 3, 1793, in Nantucket, Massachusetts, the second child of Anna Folger and Thomas Coffin. Her father, Capt. Thomas Coffin was a descendant of one of the original purchasers of Nantucket Island and carried on his forefather's occupation as a whale-fisherman. Her mother ran the family mercantile business and traded in Boston for goods in exchange for oils and candles from the island. Lucretia often ran small errands for her mother, scouring the wharves for supplies and aid for her family. Through her mother, she was a descendant of Peter Folger, a missionary on Nantucket in the mid-1600s. Her cousin was Benjamin Franklin, one of the Framers of the Constitution, while other Folger relatives were Tories, those who remained loyal to the British Crown during the American Revolution.

In 1803, at the age of 10, her father moved the Coffin family to Boston to become a merchant. She was sent at the age of 13 to the Nine Partners School, located in Dutchess County, New York, which was run by the Society of Friends (Quakers). James Mott, who would become her husband, was her teacher there. At the age of 15, she became a teacher there after graduation and learned that male teachers at the school were paid significantly more than female staff, which ignited her interest in women's rights. She was also interested in fighting slavery as a child. After her family moved to Philadelphia in 1809, she and James Mott followed in 1810. James became a merchant in the city.

== Personal life ==
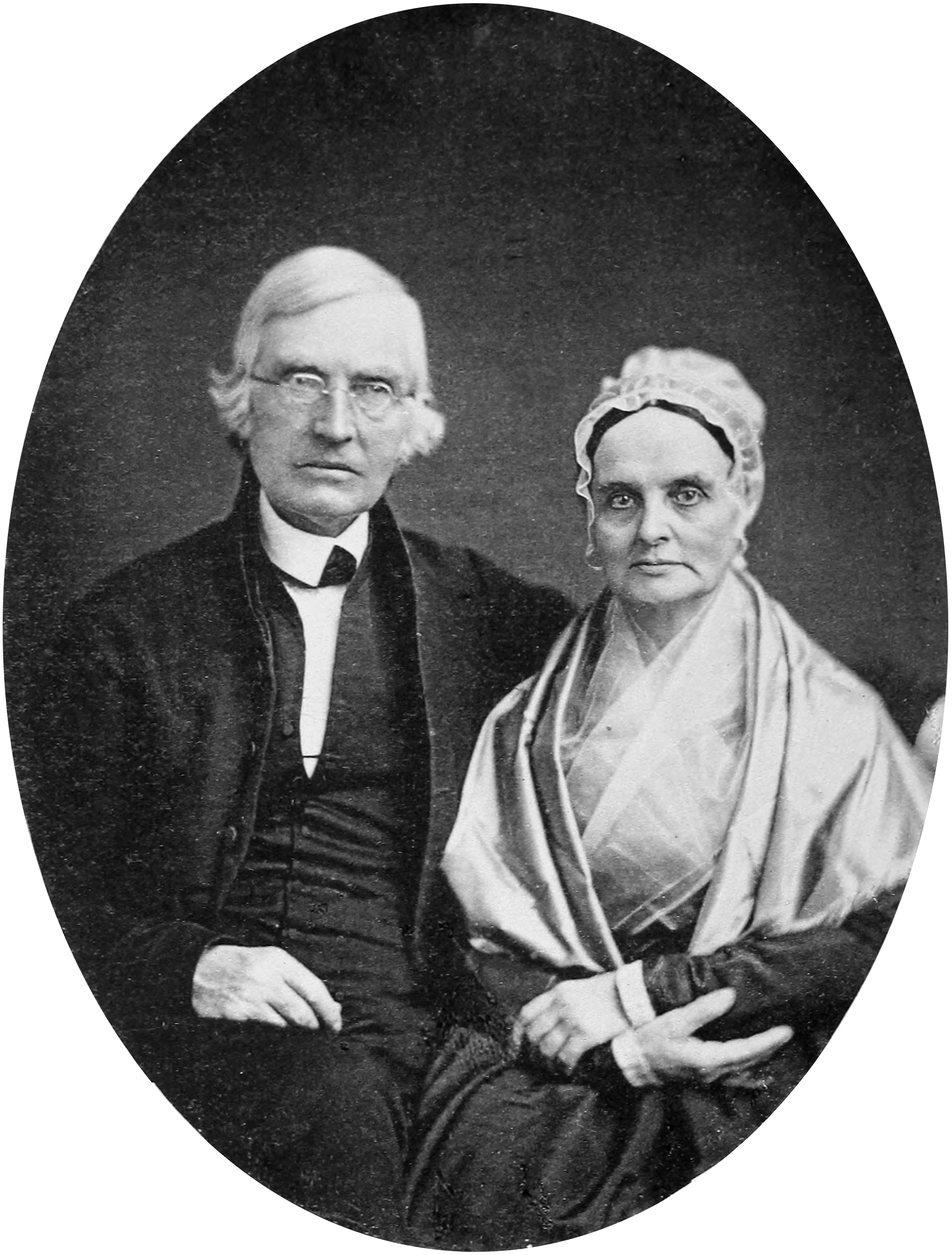
James and Lucretia Mott, 1842

On April 10, 1811, Lucretia Coffin married James Mott at Pine Street Meeting in Philadelphia. James was a Quaker businessman who shared her anti-slavery interests, supported women's rights, and helped found Swarthmore College. They raised six children, five of whom made it to adulthood.

Mott died on November 11, 1880, of pneumonia at her home, Roadside, in the district now known as La Mott, Cheltenham, Pennsylvania. She was buried at Fair Hill Burial Ground, a Quaker cemetery in North Philadelphia. At her funeral, a long silence took place. It was broken when someone asked, "Who can speak? The preacher is dead."

== Ministry ==
In 1821, at age 28, Mott was recognized by her Friends Meeting ("recorded") as a minister. By then she had been preaching for at least three years. (Note: Women of the Century (1893) states that she became a minister in 1818.) She summarized her perspective by stating: "I always loved the good, in childhood desired to do the right, and had no faith in the generally received idea of human depravity." Mott traveled throughout the United States — New England, New York, Pennsylvania, Virginia, Maryland, Ohio, and Indiana — and to England. Rare for the time, Mott was among a group of single and married women, including Jane Fenn Hoskens and Elizabeth Fry, who traveled as part of their Quaker ministry. She was described as a woman of "gentle and refined manners and of great force of character." Her sermons emphasized the Quaker inward light or the presence of the Divine within every individual, as preached by Elias Hicks. Mott and her husband followed Hicks' theology, which became the focus of a schism among Quakers who divided into either Hicksite or Orthodox. As a result, Mott served as clerk of Philadelphia Yearly Meeting and traveled in the Hicksite ministry. The Hicksites, the liberal branch, were sometimes considered to be Unitarian Quakers. The Hicksites were more prone to be part of social reform moments, including abolitionism and the fight for women's rights. Other Hicksite Friends were Susan B. Anthony and Alice Paul. Mott's sermons included her free produce and other anti-slavery sentiments.

Mott's theology was influenced by Unitarians including Theodore Parker and William Ellery Channing as well as early Quakers including William Penn. She believed that "the kingdom of God is within man" (1749). Mott was among the religious liberals who formed the Free Religious Association in 1867, with Rabbi Isaac Mayer Wise, Ralph Waldo Emerson and Thomas Wentworth Higginson.

== Abolitionist ==
=== Early anti-slavery efforts ===
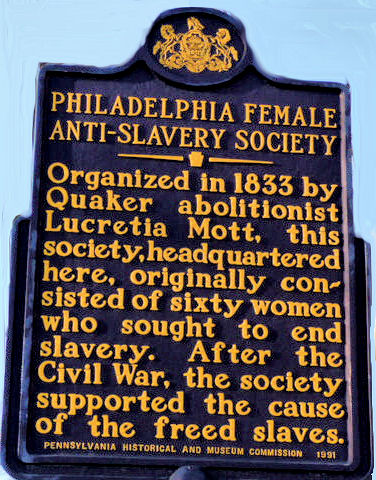
Philadelphia Female Anti-Slavery Society, N 5th & Arch Streets, Philadelphia, Pennsylvania

Mott, the "foremost white female abolitionist in the United States", called for the immediate and unconditional emancipation of enslaved people, after she visited Virginia in 1818. Mott was also a Garrisonian, and like most Hicksite Quakers, considered slavery to be immoral and called for its immediate cessation. Inspired in part by minister Elias Hicks, she and other Hicksite Quakers refused to use cotton cloth, cane sugar, and other slavery-produced goods. In 1833, she and her husband helped found the American Anti-Slavery Society. It was an organization for men, but she was invited to their first convention as a guest. She formed and was a leader of the Female Anti-Slavery Society, which merged with the male organization in 1839. Mott, was also a founding member of the Pennsylvania Anti-Slavery Society, and, with other white and black women, founded the Philadelphia Female Anti-Slavery Society. The Philadelphia Female Anti-Slavery Society was founded in 1833 by Mott and other Quaker abolitionists. Integrated from its founding, the organization opposed both slavery and racism and developed close ties to Philadelphia's Black community. Importantly, the Philadelphia Female Anti-Slavery Society was part of a growth in the number of women's antislavery groups that began to emerge in the 1830s. Additionally, Mott and other female activists also organized anti-slavery fairs to raise awareness and revenue, providing much of the funding for the movement.

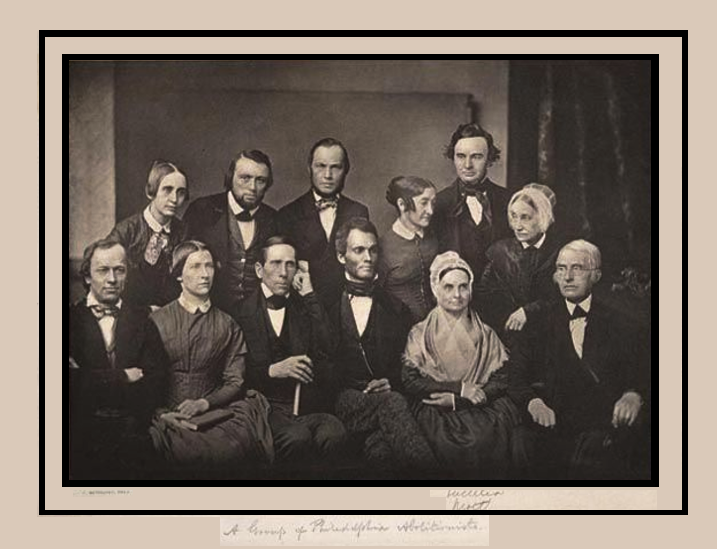
Philadelphia abolitionists, Pennsylvania Anti-Slavery Society, 1851. Standing left to right are Mary Grew, Edward M. Davis, Haworth Wetherald, Abigail Kimber, Miller McKim, and Sarah Pugh. Seated left to right are Oliver Johnson, Margaret Jones Burleigh, Benjamin C. Bacon, Robert Purvis, Mott, and James Mott.

Mott attended all three national Anti-Slavery Conventions of American Women (1837, 1838, 1839). During the 1838 convention in Philadelphia, a mob destroyed Pennsylvania Hall, a newly opened meeting place built by abolitionists. Mott and the white and black women delegates linked arms to exit the building safely through the crowd. Afterward, the mob targeted her home and Black institutions and neighborhoods in Philadelphia. As a friend redirected the mob, Mott waited in her parlor, willing to face her violent opponents.

Amidst social persecution by abolition opponents and pain from dyspepsia, Mott continued her work for the abolitionist cause. She managed their household budget to extend hospitality to guests, including fugitive slaves, and donated to charities. Mott was praised for her ability to maintain her household while contributing to the cause. In the words of one editor, "She is proof that it is possible for a woman to widen her sphere without deserting it."

=== World's Anti-Slavery Convention ===
1840 World Anti-Slavery Convention. Move your cursor to identify delegates or click the icon to enlarge.

In June 1840, Mott attended the General Anti-Slavery Convention, better known as the World's Anti-Slavery Convention, in London, England. Despite Mott's status as one of six women delegates, before the conference began, the men voted to exclude the American women from participating, and the female delegates were required to sit in a segregated area. Anti-slavery leaders did not want the women's rights issue to become associated with the cause of ending slavery worldwide and dilute the focus on abolition. In addition, the social mores of the time denied women's full participation in public political life. Even so, Mott "made many telling addresses" at the convention. Several of the American men attending the convention, including William Lloyd Garrison and Wendell Phillips, protested the women's exclusion. Garrison, Nathaniel Peabody Rogers, William Adam, and African American activist Charles Lenox Remond sat with the women in the segregated area. Activists Elizabeth Cady Stanton and her husband Henry Brewster Stanton attended the convention while on their honeymoon. Stanton admired Mott, and the two women became united as friends and allies.

One Irish reporter deemed her the "Lioness of the Convention". Mott was among the women included in the commemorative painting of the convention, which also featured female British activists: Elizabeth Pease, Mary Anne Rawson, Anne Knight, Elizabeth Tredgold and Mary Clarkson, daughter of Thomas Clarkson. Benjamin Haydon, the painting's creator, had intended to give Mott a prominent place in the painting. However, during a sitting on June 29, 1840, to capture her likeness, he took a dislike to her views and decided to not use her portrait prominently.

=== Underground Railroad and other activities ===
Encouraged by active debates in England and Scotland, and the passage of the Fugitive Slave Act of 1850, Mott also returned with new energy for the anti-slavery cause in the United States. She and her husband allowed their Philadelphia-area home, called Roadside, in the district now known as La Mott, to be used as a stop on the Underground Railroad. She continued an active public lecture schedule, with destinations including the major Northern cities of New York City and Boston, as well as travel over several weeks to slave-owning states, with speeches in Baltimore, Maryland and other cities in Virginia. She arranged to meet with slave owners to discuss the morality of slavery. In the District of Columbia, Mott timed her lecture to coincide with the return of Congress from Christmas recess; more than 40 Congressmen attended. She had a personal audience with President John Tyler who, impressed with her speech, said, "I would like to hand Mr. Calhoun over to you", referring to the senator and abolition opponent. In 1855, with several other female abolitionists, Mott participated in the transportation of Jane Johnson, an enslaved woman, to Boston after Johnson, with the aid of William Still, Passmore Williamson and others, had emancipated herself, while passing through Philadelphia on a trip from North Carolina to New York with her master, in accordance with Pennsylvania law.

== Women's rights ==
=== Overview ===
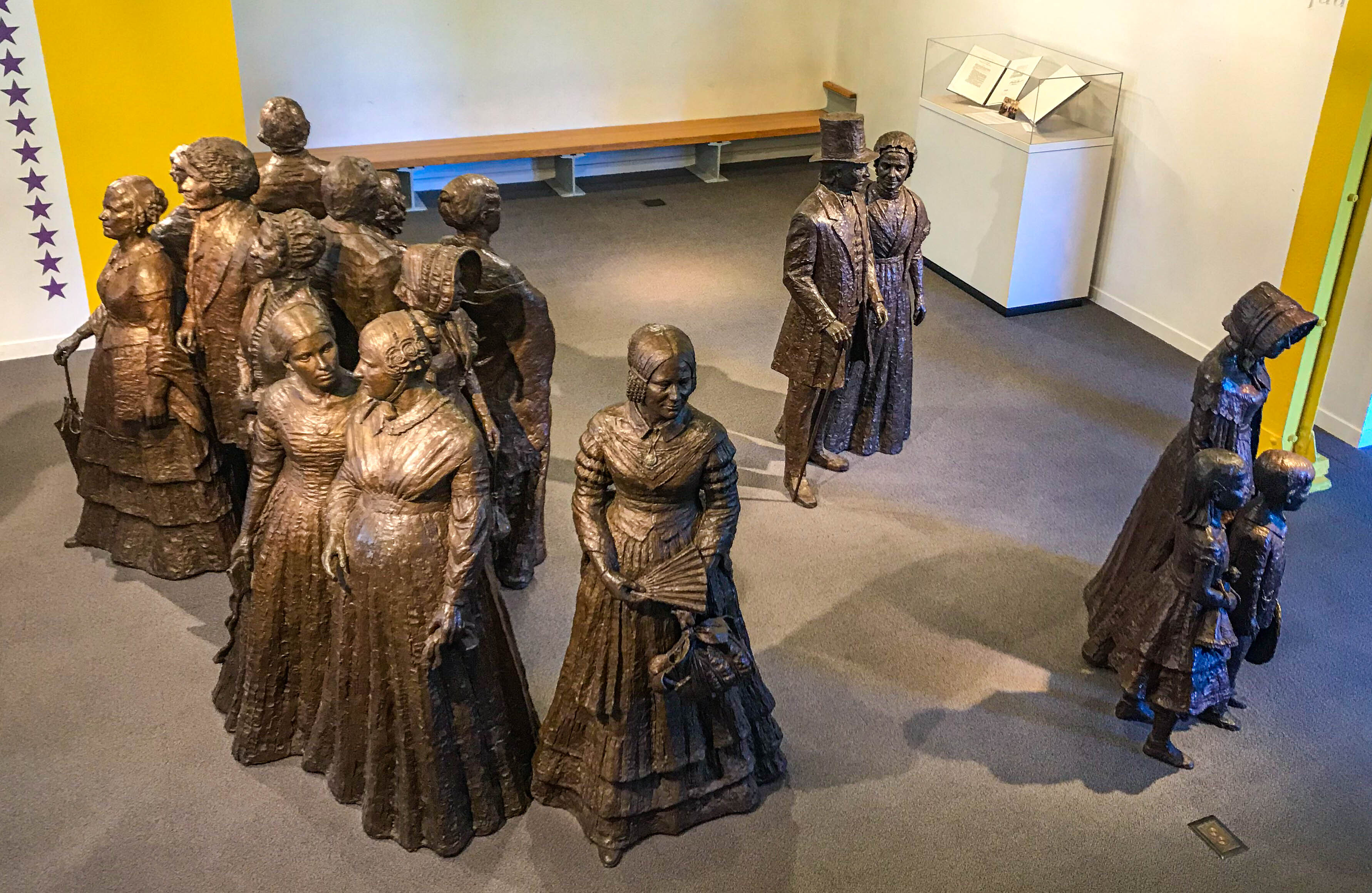
Sculptor Lloyd Lillie's "The First Wave" statues in the Women's Rights National Historical Park Visitor Center. On the far left are Elizabeth Cady Stanton and Frederick Douglass (with Lucretia Mott and James Mott not visible behind them); of the two women in the front, the one on the right is Martha Coffin Wright; the man and woman standing together in the rear are Thomas M'Clintock and Mary Ann M'Clintock. The others are unidentified.

Women's rights activists advocated a range of issues, including equality in marriage, such as women's property rights and rights to their earnings. At that time, it was very difficult to obtain a divorce, and fathers were almost always granted custody of children. Cady Stanton sought to make divorce easier to obtain and to safeguard women's access to and control of their children. Though some early feminists disagreed, and viewed Cady Stanton's proposal as scandalous, Mott stated "her great faith in Elizabeth Stanton's quick instinct & clear insight in all appertaining to women's rights."

Lucretia Mott was brought up in the Quaker tradition and many of her beliefs derived from her faith. As such, she rejected Christian beliefs which held that Christian scripture condoned slavery and gender inequality. In a speech Mott Said "The laws given on Mount Sinai for the government of man and woman were equal, the precepts of Jesus make no distinction. Those who read the Scriptures, and judge for themselves, not resting satisfied with the perverted application of the text, do not find the distinction, that theology and ecclesiastical authorities have made, in the condition of the sexes."

Mott was a founder and president of the Northern Association for the Relief and Employment of Poor Women in Philadelphia (founded in 1846). In 1850, Mott published her speech Discourse on Woman, a pamphlet about restrictions on women in the United States.

=== Seneca Falls Convention ===
In 1848, Mott and Cady Stanton organized the Seneca Falls Convention, the first women's rights convention, at Seneca Falls, New York. Stanton's resolution that it was "the duty of the women of this country to secure to themselves the sacred right to the elective franchise" was passed despite Mott's opposition. Mott viewed politics as corrupted by slavery and moral compromises, but she soon concluded that women's "right to the elective franchise however, is the same, and should be yielded to her, whether she exercises that right or not." Noted abolitionist and human rights activist Frederick Douglass was in attendance and played a key role in persuading the other attendees to agree to a resolution calling for women's suffrage. Mott signed the Seneca Falls Declaration of Sentiments.

Despite Mott's opposition to electoral politics, her fame had reached into the political arena. During the June 1848 National Convention of the Liberty Party, 5 voting delegates cast their ballots for Lucretia Mott to be their party's candidate for the Office of U.S. Vice President, making her the first woman to run for that position.

=== Sermon to the Medical Students ===
The biological justifications of race as a biologically provable basis for difference gave rise to the stigma of innate, naturally determined inferiority in the 19th century. In 1849, Mott's "Sermon to the Medical Students" was published:

"May you be faithful, and enter into a consideration as to how far you are partakers in this evil, even in other men's sins. How far, by permission, by apology, or otherwise, you are found lending your sanction to a system which degrades and brutalizes three million of our fellow beings."

=== American Equal Rights Association ===
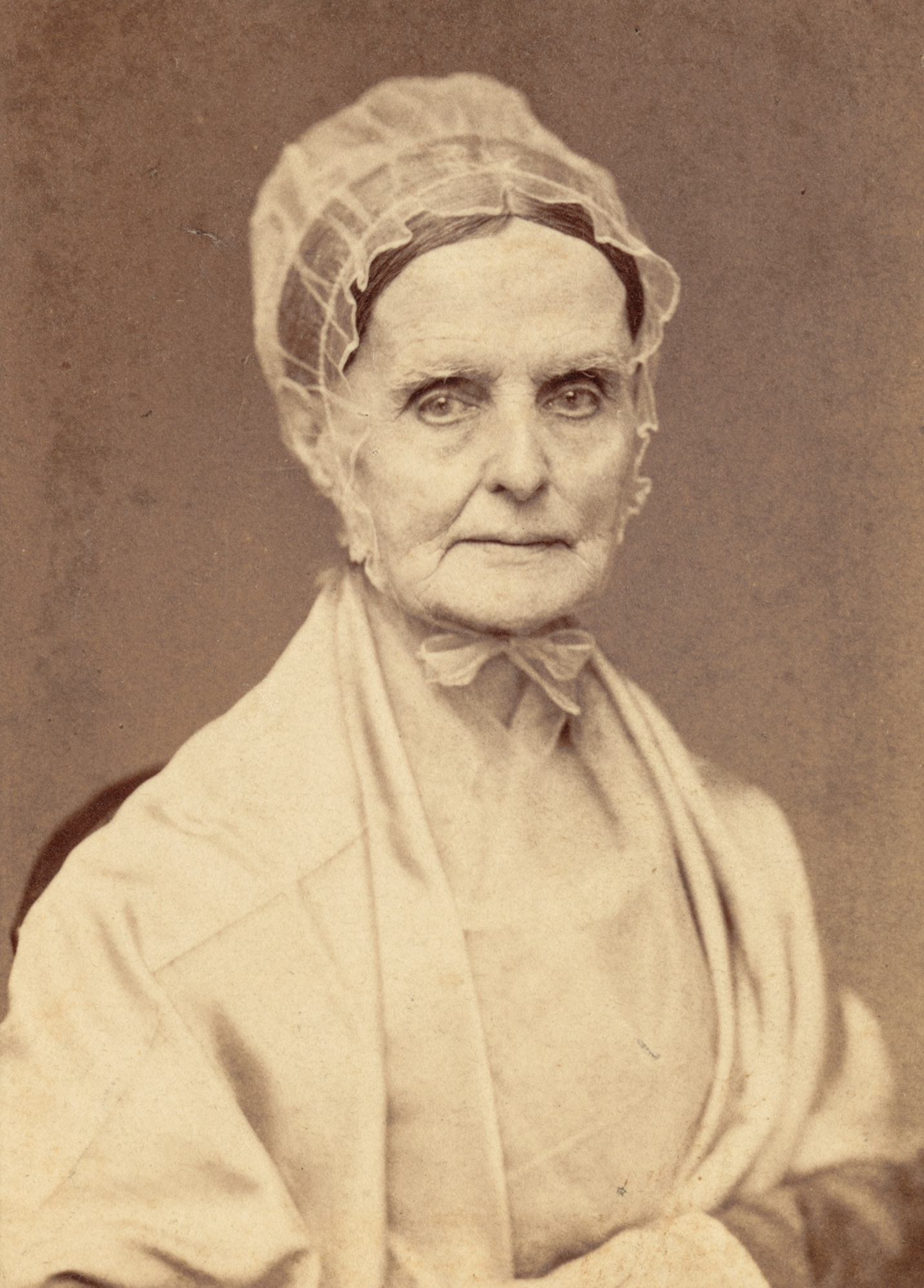
Lucretia Mott, c. 1859–1870, Carte de Visite Collection, Boston Public Library.

In 1866, after the Civil War, the American Equal Rights Association was founded, with Mott serving as the first president of the integrated organization. The following year, Mott and Stanton became active in Kansas where black suffrage and woman suffrage were to be decided by popular vote. The Equal Rights Association, with male and female members, favored male suffrage. Stanton and Anthony formed the National Woman's Suffrage Association for women only.

== Educational institutions ==
Intending to create educational opportunities for women, Mott helped found the Female Medical College of Pennsylvania and Swarthmore College in Swarthmore, Pennsylvania (near Philadelphia). She was a fund-raiser for the Philadelphia School of Design for Women.

== Pacifism ==
Mott was a pacifist, and in the 1830s, she attended meetings of the New England Non-Resistance Society. For several years, she was president of the Pennsylvania Peace Society. She opposed the War with Mexico (1846–1848). After the Civil War, Mott increased her efforts to end war and violence, and she was a leading voice in the Universal Peace Union, founded in 1866.

== Legacy ==
Designations

Pennsylvania Historical Marker
- Official name: Lucretia C. Mott
- Type: Roadside
- Criteria: Civil Rights, Government & Politics, Government & Politics 19th Century, Religion, Underground Railroad, Women
- Designated: May 1, 1974
- Location: Pennsylvania Route 611 at Latham Pkwy., N of Cheltenham Ave., Elkins Park
- Marker Text: Nearby stood "Roadside," the home of the ardent Quakeress, Lucretia C. Mott (1793–1880). Her most notable work was in connection with antislavery, women's rights, temperance, and peace.

Susan Jacoby wrote, "When Mott died in 1880, she was widely judged by her contemporaries - even many who had opposed her brand of abolitionism and who continued to oppose equal rights for women - as the greatest American woman of the nineteenth century."

The first volume of History of Woman Suffrage, published in 1881, states, “THESE VOLUMES ARE AFFECTIONATELY INSCRIBED TO THE Memory of Mary Wollstonecraft, Frances Wright, Lucretia Mott, Harriet Martineau, Lydia Maria Child, Margaret Fuller, Sarah and Angelina Grimké, Josephine S. Griffing, Martha C. Wright, Harriot K. Hunt, M.D., Mariana W. Johnson, Alice and Phebe Carey, Ann Preston, M.D., Lydia Mott, Eliza W. Farnham, Lydia F. Fowler, M.D., Paulina Wright Davis, Whose Earnest Lives and Fearless Words, in Demanding Political Rights for Women, have been, in the Preparation of these Pages, a Constant Inspiration TO The Editors”.

The Camp Town section of Cheltenham Township, Pennsylvania, which was the site of Camp William Penn, and of Mott's home, Roadside, was renamed La Mott in her honor in 1885.

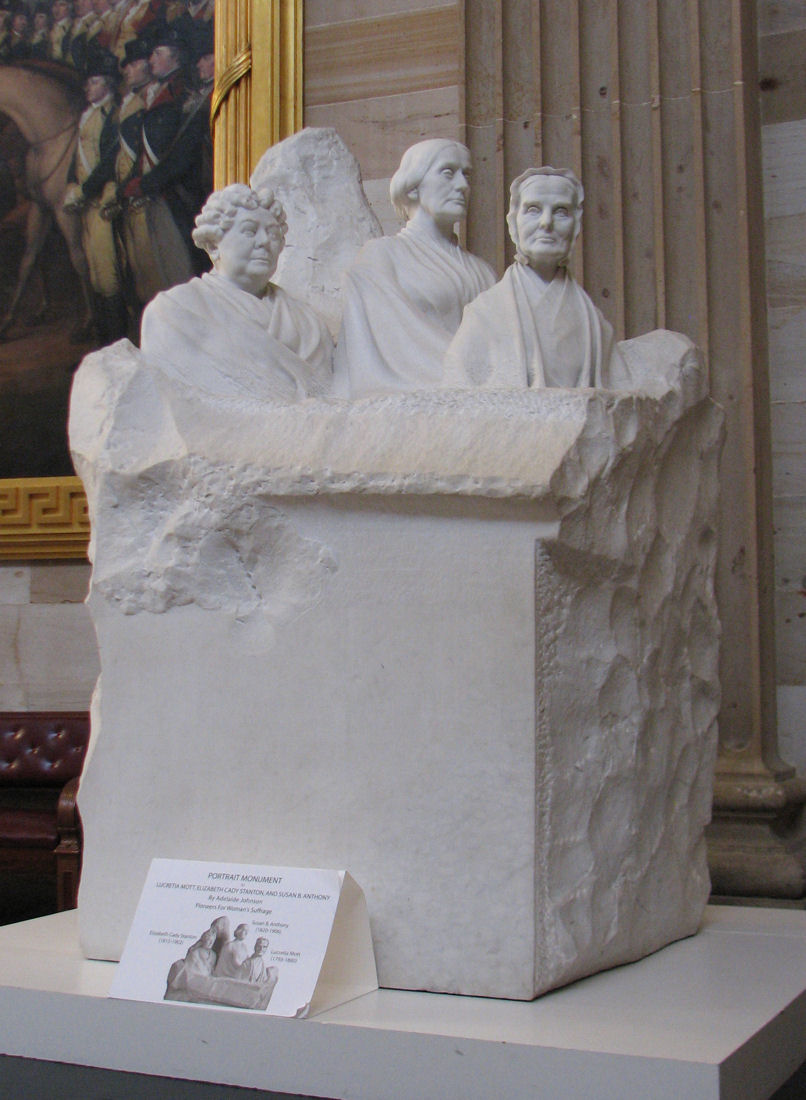
The Portrait Monument in the U.S. Capitol rotunda, by Adelaide Johnson (1921), features (left to right) suffrage leaders Elizabeth Cady Stanton, Susan B. Anthony, and Mott.

Mott is commemorated along with Elizabeth Cady Stanton and Susan B. Anthony in Portrait Monument, a 1921 sculpture by Adelaide Johnson at the United States Capitol. Originally kept on display in the crypt of the US Capitol, the sculpture was moved to its current location and more prominently displayed in the rotunda in 1997.

A version of the Equal Rights Amendment from 1923, which differs from the current text, was named the Lucretia Mott Amendment. That draft read, "Men and women shall have equal rights throughout the United States and every place subject to its jurisdiction. Congress shall have power to enforce this article by appropriate legislation."

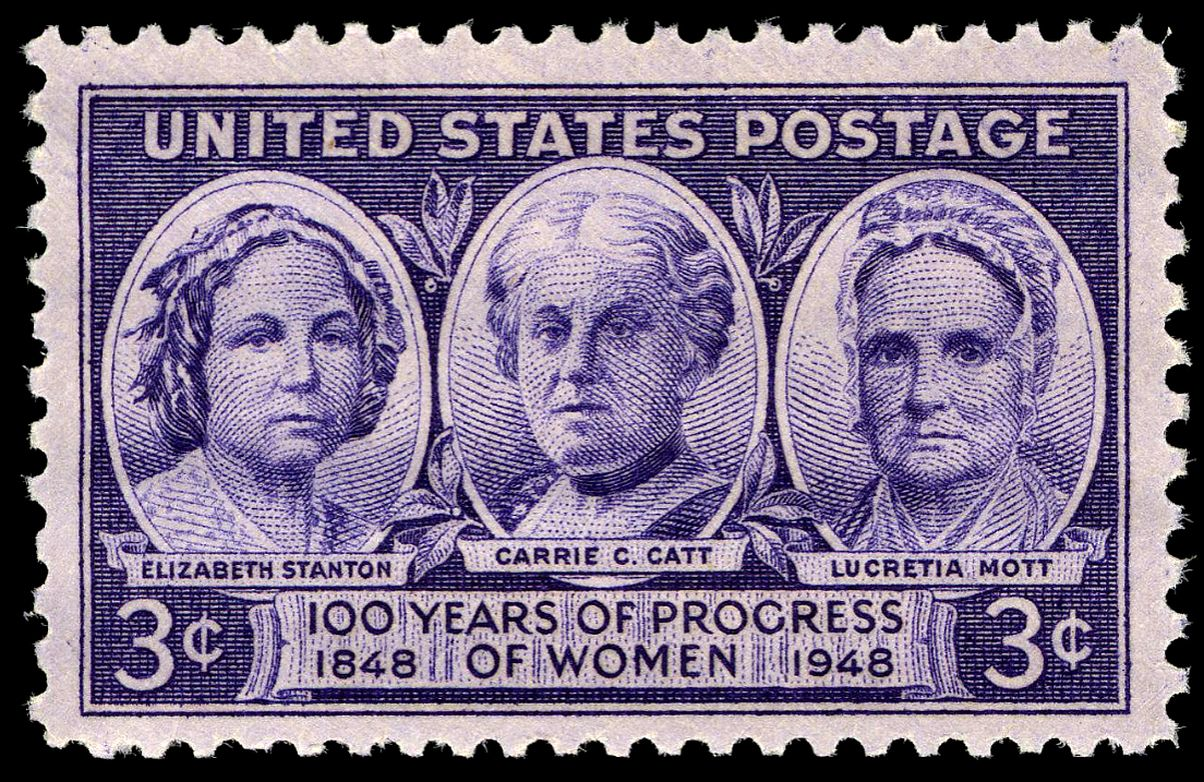
U.S.commemorative stamp of 1948, Seneca Falls Convention titled 100 Years of Progress of Women: 1848–1948. From left to right, Stanton, Carrie Chapman Catt, Lucretia Mott.

The United States Post Office issued a stamp titled 100 Years of Progress of Women: 1848–1948 in 1948 on the centennial of the Seneca Falls Convention, featuring Elizabeth Cady Stanton, Carrie Chapman Catt, and Lucretia Mott. (Elizabeth Cady Stanton on left, Carrie Chapman Catt in middle, Lucretia Mott on right.)

In 1983, Mott was inducted into the National Women's Hall of Fame.

In 2005, Mott was inducted into the National Abolition Hall of Fame, in Peterboro, New York.

In 2015, P.S. 215 Lucretia Mott, in Queens, New York City, closed; it was named for her.

The U.S. Treasury Department announced in 2016 that an image of Mott will appear on the back of a newly designed $10 bill along with Sojourner Truth, Susan B. Anthony, Elizabeth Cady Stanton, Alice Paul and the 1913 Woman Suffrage Procession. Designs for new $5, $10 and $20 bills will be unveiled in 2020 in conjunction with the 100th anniversary of American women winning the right to vote via the Nineteenth Amendment.

The Lucretia Mott School in Washington D.C. was named after her.

The Lucretia Mott room in the Friends House in London is named after her, as is the Lucretia Mott room in the Friends Center in Philadelphia, and the Lucretia Mott room in Swarthmore College (formerly called the conference room Parrish E 254).

== See also ==
- History of feminism
- Jane Johnson (slave)
- List of suffragists and suffragettes
- List of civil rights leaders
- Suffragette
- Women's Social and Political Union
- Women's suffrage in the United States
