= Abigail Kimber =

American botanist, social reformer

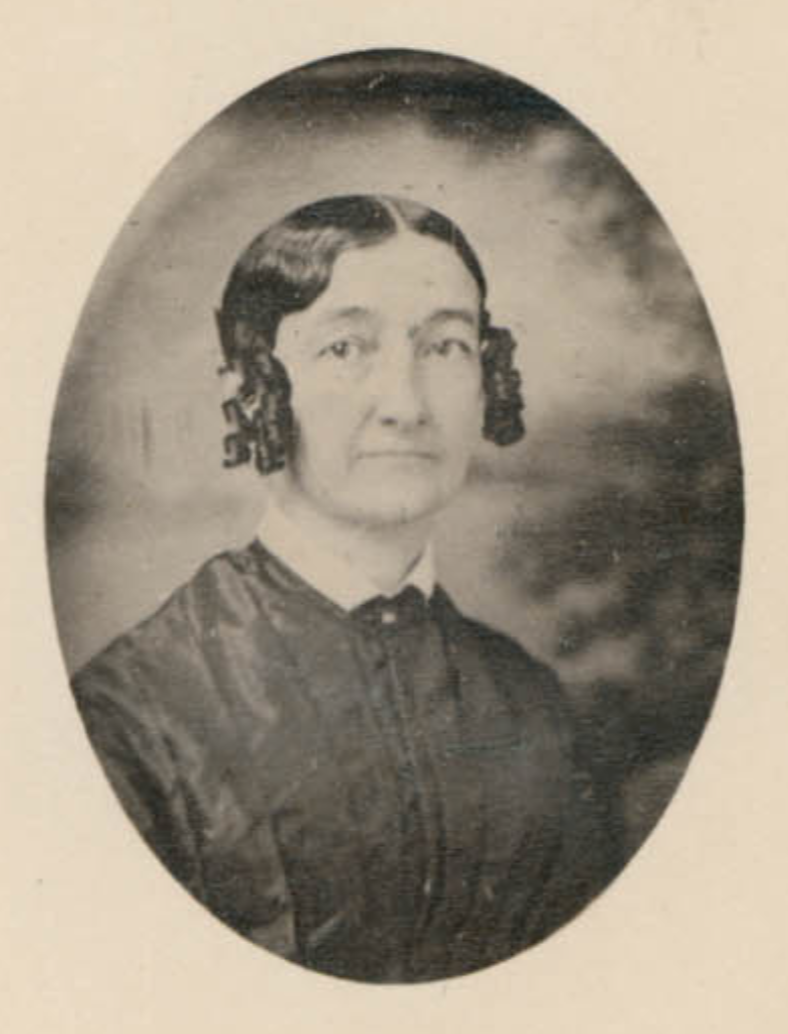
- Born: 1804; Philadelphia, Pennsylvania
- Died: March 22, 1871; Philadelphia, Pennsylvania

Abigail Kimber (1804 – 22 March 1871) was an American botanist, botanical collector, social reformer, abolitionist, and women’s rights activist.

== Early life ==
Abigail Kimber, nicknamed Abby, was born in Philadelphia, Pennsylvania in 1804 to parents Emmor and Susan Kimber. Emmor and Susan Kimber ran a Quaker girls boarding school called Kimberton, considered one of the three most important boarding schools in southeastern rural Pennsylvania in the 1830s. The school survived only 32 years, from 1818 until Emmor Kimber's death in 1850, but during its time it came to specialize in training pupils to become teachers. Abigail, along with her sisters Mary and Martha, did the teaching for the school, with Abigail beginning to teach at age 14 and taking responsibility for the school's curriculum in the 1820s. Kimberton was considered a unique school because the Kimbers were involved in reform movements of the time, and often involved their students, with Abigail even taking students to temperance meetings. Gertrude K. Wilson, a Kimberton student, wrote that the students "absorbed a love of right and hatred of wrong and oppression which made us what was then called abolitionists." Many students spoke fondly of Abigail, saying that her example and noble purposes in life inspired them to become teachers and to better themselves as people. Kimber continued teaching for the 30 years that Kimberton remained open.

== Social activism ==
Abigail Kimber was an anti-slavery activist, taking an active role in the Philadelphia Female Anti-Slavery Society as Recording Secretary, Vice President, and President at different periods throughout her involvement. Kimber was also on the Executive Committee of the Pennsylvania Anti-Slavery Society. In June of 1840, Kimber attended the World Antislavery Convention in London, England. Kimber and her fellow female delegates from Massachusetts had been denied seats in the convention and were excluded from membership, but several American abolitionist societies sent female delegates anyways. Through her travels to the convention, Kimber met and debated with British women on the "Woman Question." Throughout her life, Kimber continued to take part in the abolitionist movement and promote the rights of women.

“Thou knowest I am not a Delegate, I do not speak with authority in this matter, but if there is a conciliatory spirit in the Committee I should be glad indeed if it would display itself, not in the courtesy of gentlemen, but in the honest purpose of becoming men, who have unwittingly done deep wrong to a large proportion of the Abolitionists of the United States”.

— Abigail Kimber, Letter to Reverend John Scoble, secretary of the British and Foreign Anti-Slavery Society, in Protest (1840)

== Botany collections ==
Kimber taught chemistry and botany at the Kimberton Boarding School for Girls, teaching pupils such as Graceanna Lewis, who would later go on to become a natural history teacher herself. Kimber uncovered and distinguished many species, and also achieved fame in the botanist community as a plant collector. Kimber is noted as the second recorded donator of plant objects to the Delaware County Institute of Science. The donation was submitted on November 22, 1834, and consisted of “Brown hematite and plumbago," a type of mineral and a shrub. Kimber was noted to collect both plants and minerals, which she forwarded to William Darlington, who went on to cite her collections in his 1837 and 1853 editions of his botanical index Flora Cestrica: An Attempt to Enumerate and Describe the Flowering and Filicoid Plants of Chester County, in the State of Pennsylvania. William Darlington later argued in the 1853 edition of his index that the best way to diffuse botany was to educate women in the science, perhaps inspired by the women botanists he interacted with, including Kimber.

== Death ==
Abigail Kimber died on March 22, 1871, in Philadelphia, Pennsylvania at the age of 66 or 67 of unknown causes.

== Publications ==
- Familiar Botany; to which is added, a Complete Botanical Dictionary, 12 mo. Philadelphia, 1854.
