= Samuel Moore (colonial official) =

Samuel Moore (about 1630 – 27 May 1688), was notable as one of the civil leaders in the early years of the Province of New Jersey.

Samuel Moore (called Moores in Savage's Genealogical Dictionary) removed from Newbury, Massachusetts to Middlesex County, New Jersey in 1665, soon after the Duke of York had ceded the province of New Jersey to John, Lord Berkeley and Sir George Carteret in 1664. Locating at Woodbridge Township, New Jersey, Moore filed surveys for a number of tracts of land in the Woodbridge and Piscataway townships; on the 27 December 1667, a patent was issued to him for 70 acres (280,000 m^{2}) of land at a yearly rental of a half-penny sterling per acre. This 70-acre (280,000 m^{2}) lot is situated in the lower end of what is now called "Lower Rahway". Part of the old tract remained in the family until the latter part of the 19th century. His house lot at Woodbridge encompassed 16 acres (65,000 m^{2}) of land.

Samuel Moore and Robert Dennis were chosen as delegates to represent the town of Woodbridge at the 2nd General Assembly of the province of East Jersey which convened at Elizabethtown on 3 November 1668, under Philip Carteret (Governor). Samuel Moore was appointed Treasurer of the Province of East Jersey on 4 December 1675 and reappointed in 1678, with compensation set at nine pence per pound. In 1682, he was ordained by an act of the Legislature one of the Commissioners for laying out highways, bridges, landings and ferries in Middlesex County, New Jersey. At the first division of the public land of Woodbridge among the freeholders, in about 1670, Samuel Moore received a double portion amounting to about 356 acres (1.44 km^{2}).

His fellow townsmen elected him to various positions of trust, including: Assistant Justice of the Township Court, 1669–71, 1671 and 1681; President of the Court 1672–74; Marshall 1676; Clerk of the Court 1676–87; Overseer of the Highway 1669–70; Ratemaker (Assessor) during most of the period 1672–87; Rategatherer 1675-79 and 1683; Overseer of the poor 1682; Deputy in the General Assembly 1669, 1670, 1683 and 1688; Lieutenant of the military 1675. During the year 1683, he held the office of High Sheriff of Middlesex County, Deputy to the Assembly, Messenger of the House of Deputies, Town Clerk of Woodbridge and Tax Collector of the township.

Notable among his descendants are:

- a peace rider sent to the treaty talks at Sandusky, Ohio in 1793, Joseph Moore (peace rider);
- a leader in the early Quaker movement in the Canadian maritimes, Samuel Moore U.E.;
- a member of the Legislative Assembly of Upper Canada, Elias Moore;
- a leader in the Rebellions of 1837 in Upper Canada, Enoch Moore (Loyalist turned rebel);
- the builder of one of the earliest brick houses in South-western Ontario, the John Moore House (Sparta, Ontario);
- a Principal of Haverford College, and abolitionist, Lindley Murray Moore;
- a surgeon, a President of University of Rochester, and father of the Rochester, N.Y. public parks system, Edward Mott Moore;
- the Baptist church planter, James Beach Moore;
- a member of the House of Commons of Canada, William Henry Moore;
- the Founder of Central Baptist Seminary, W. Gordon Brown;
- the Roman Catholic priest who administered free dental care, L. Douglas Brown;
- first woman to be named Athlete of the Year for Wisconsin, Carol Sorenson Flenniken;
- the Grammy award-winning record producer, Peter J. Moore;
- Lawyer, writer and environmental advocate M. Jane Fairburn ;
- Associate Chief Justice of the Supreme Court of Ontario, J. Michal Fairburn
