= James Beach Moore =

Canadian Baptist pastor (1842–1931)

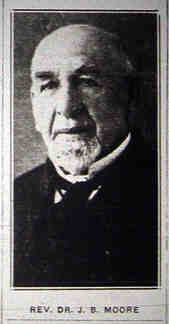
James Beach Moore

James Beach Moore (April 1, 1842, in Norwich, Canada West – August 29, 1931, in Waterford, Ontario) was a Canadian Baptist pastor. He started a number of Baptist congregations in Ontario, including Stouffville Baptist Church in Stouffville, Ontario.

== Early life and education ==
James Beach Moore was born into a Quaker family in Norwich, Canada West. His great-grandfather, Samuel Moore had been a leader of the Quaker movement in Nova Scotia. His father, William Shotwell Moore, had moved from Rahway, New Jersey, to Upper Canada, where he married Rachel Tompkins, and together they had 16 children, James Beach Moore being the fourth. James' great-uncle, Elias Moore, though a leader in the Quaker community, and a member of the Legislative Assembly of Upper Canada from 1835 to 1840, had been arrested for his part in the Upper Canada Rebellion. His great-uncles, Enoch and John, had also been arrested in the same rebellion. Another great-uncle, Lindley had been a leader in the abolitionist and temperance movements in Rochester, New York.

According to James' obituary in the Waterford Star newspaper,

when he was seventeen years old, he determined to enter the Gospel ministry, although he was opposed by his father who had been a Quaker in all of his training and his sympathies. The young man had the choice of leaving home or leaving the religious meetings. He chose the former and was baptized and united with the Baptist Church at Burgessville.

According to Canadian Baptist magazine:

He left home to obtain an education, preparatory to entering the ministry. Providence directed his steps to the United States and, when the civil war broke out, he enlisted, being selected as an aide de camp to General Philip Kearny with the army of the Potomac in Virginia. His father obtained his discharge and he returned home to enter Woodstock Baptist College.

He studied at Woodstock for six years.

== Ministry ==
"He was ordained to the ministry and became pastor of a small Church in Whitevale, Ontario at a salary of four hundred dollars a year. He was instrumental in forming three new churches in the district.

"Rev. Mr. Moore [then] devoted a year to evangelistic work after which he assumed a pastorate in Tillsonburg and from 1880 onward labored there and in the nearby village of Brownsville. After a year or two in the village of Scotland he came to Waterford. After five years as pastor of the Waterford Baptist Church, he again began evangelistic work and for eight years was [traveling] among the churches, while his family lived in Toronto. Then he returned to the pastorate and assumed charges in Blenheim, Brownsville and Delhi successively. At the conclusion of his Delhi pastorate, he retired because he was then nearly 70 years of age.

"As late as the summer of 1928, in his 86th year, his services were still in keen demand and he preached 28 sermons that year. It was about this time that McMaster University conferred on Moore the degree of Doctor of Divinity. In the last few years he had continued to do supply work when called upon.

"For the last twelve years or more [of his life], Moore had made his winter home at St. Petersburg, Florida, where he became permanent chaplain of the Canadian Association of St.Petersburg, comprising about 300 members, the Grand Army of the Republic which included forty Civil War veterans, and the Three Quarter Century Club, comprising over 300 members, all of whom were over 75 years of age. The Elder's infinite capacity for telling stories made him a prime favorite with the Canadian colony in Florida."

According to his obituary in the Canadian Baptist magazine, "When Rev. Moore died, he was the oldest minister in the Baptist denomination of Canada and probably the only survivor of Canadian nationality who participated in the American Civil War ... Elder Moore, as he was more familiarly know in later life, occupied the pulpit in practically every Baptist church in the province [of Ontario] on one or more occasions."

== Personal life ==
James Beach Moore married Hannah Elizabeth Greenwood. Their son, William Henry Moore, a lawyer and author, was elected to the House of Commons of Canada, where he sat as a Liberal for almost 15 years, from 1930 to 1945. Their one grandson, W. Gordon Brown, was the founder of Central Baptist Seminary in Toronto, the leading Canadian theological training school for evangelical Baptists from 1949 to 1993. Another grandson, L. Douglas Brown, brother to W. Gordon, was ordained as a Roman Catholic priest in 1949. After Hannah Elizabeth Greenwood's death in 1919, Moore married Jeannie Provan Gray on May 4, 1921.
