= Hawtry =

Hawtry is a surname. Notable people with the surname include:

- Charles Hawtrey (disambiguation), multiple people
- Mary Hawtry (c. 1598–1661), English royalist

== See also ==
- Hawtrey
