= L. Douglas Brown =

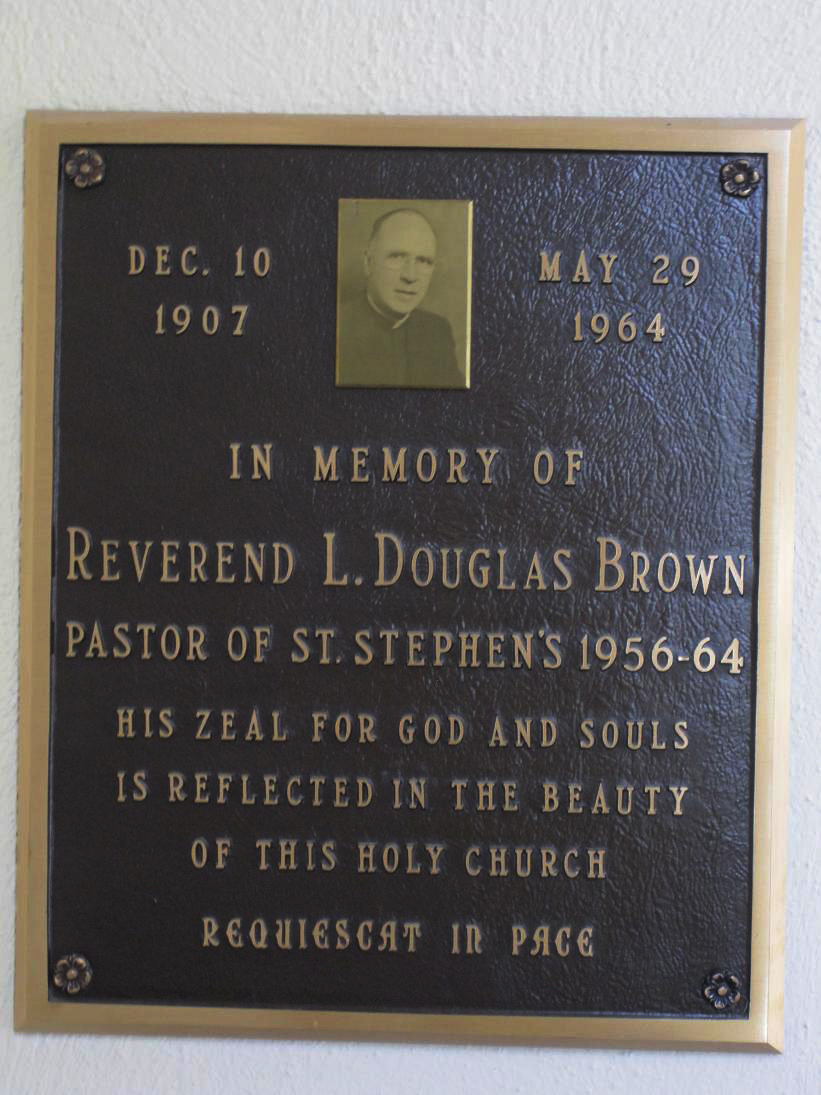
Plaque displayed in St.Stephen's R.C.Church in Cayuga, Ontario

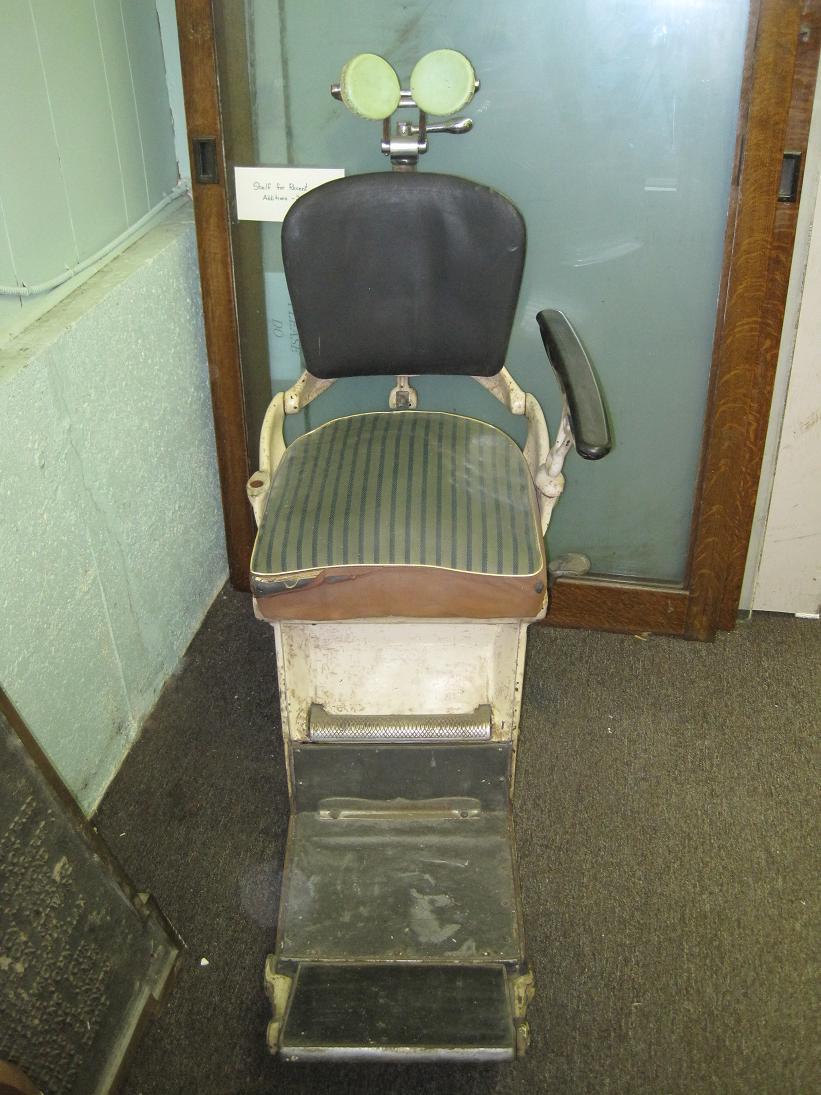
Dental chair used by Father Brown in the basement of St.Stephen's R.C. Church

Lloyd Douglas Brown (December 10, 1907 – May 29, 1964) was a Canadian clergyman known for his theological journey from Baptist to Anglican to Roman Catholic priesthood. Born in Waterford, Ontario, into a family with deep Protestant roots, Brown eventually distinguished himself in the Roman Catholic Church through his pastoral service and community engagement, most notably offering free dental care in the basement of his parish in Cayuga, Ontario. His ministry was marked by practical outreach and the development of educational and religious infrastructure, including the founding of local Catholic schools. He died while serving as pastor of St. Stephen's Roman Catholic Church in Cayuga.

He was born December 10, 1907, in Waterford, Ontario, Canada into the home of a Baptist minister, to the daughter of a Baptist minister, James Beach Moore who was the son of a Quaker. He distinguished himself as a servant of the people, even to the point of administering free dental care in the basement of his church.

L.D. Brown started his theological training at the Toronto Bible College, a conservative Protestant training institution. After graduating from there, he continued in 1931, at Wycliffe College, an evangelical Anglican training institution in Toronto and graduated with a B.A. in 1934.

He was ordained as an Anglican deacon in 1934 and as a priest June 16, 1935 in the Diocese of Niagara, Ontario.

He served as Assistant Rector from 1934-1938 at St. George's Anglican Church, Guelph. On Nov. 1, 1938 he became the Rector of the Anglican churches in Jarvis and Nanticoke, Ontario. From July 15, 1941 to March 15, 1944 he was Rector of St. James Anglican Church, Guelph.

"The rector of the war years also changed liturgical practices. R.(sic) Douglas Brown, who served from 1941 to 1943, was a handsome, single young man of Baptist background who inadvertently incited the mothers of the parish to try and marry off their eligible daughters. He did a lot of physical work around the church building. Decidedly high church, he told parishioners that he was intent on bringing things down from the mountain. Some were offended by the way he conducted services. Brown later converted to Roman Catholicism."

March 15, 1944 he received transfer papers to the Diocese of Tennessee and served at the Calvary Episcopal Church in Memphis. He resigned from Calvary Church, Memphis, Tenn. Sept. 1946.

He was still listed in the Memphis area throughout 1947, but by June 1948 he was studying at the Roman Catholic Loyola College, Montreal, P.Q. By 1949, he had taken ordination as a Roman Catholic Priest. In that same year, his brother W. Gordon Brown was founding another conservative Baptist seminary in Toronto, Ontario. In June 1950, he was living at St. Thomas More Rectory (R.C.) in Arlington, Virginia.

In 1956, he was installed as the Pastor of St. Stephen's Roman Catholic Church, Cayuga, Ontario, Canada.

"Father Brown was a man of vision and also a man who was prepared to take the action to see that it was accomplished. Without a doubt he will always be remembered as the man who brought the long time dream of a separate school to reality. He oversaw the building of St. Stephen's School as well as the Bishop McCarthy School on Highway 56, in Seneca Township. With change always comes uncertainty, and St. Stephen's was to go through a troubled time until the community accepted the change to a two school system. A benevolent person, he often used his own resources to achieve what the parish or diocese could not afford at the time. This included a free dental clinic in the basement of the rectory, as well as major and beautiful changes to the sanctuary and church as a whole. Along with an addition to the sacristy, Italian marble and beautiful art work adom St. Stephen's today. Father Brown also worked hard to increase attendance and return those to the fold who had drifted away. He was a very social person and had many functions like the Open House at the new rectory in September of 1956, as no formal ceremony had been held since its erection. A community-minded priest, he gave land for the new Scout Hall and underwrote the cost of many church, school, and community project. In the midst of his active priesthood, he was diagnosed with cancer and became ill in 1963 and was assisted by Father Cartwright. Father Brown died in 1964 and was buried in Holy Sepulchre Cemetery in Hamilton. Bronze plaques commemorate this priest and his achievements and are mounted in the entrance to St. Stephen's Church as well as St. Stephen's School."

To meet the needs of the community, Father Brown offered dental services in the basement of St.Stephen's Church rectory. He was not a licensed dentist prior to being a priest. His first cousin was a licensed dentist in Hamilton, Ontario and perhaps he offered training and equipment when L.. Douglas Brown described the need for these services in the community. His dentist chair and dental instruments were donated to Haldimand County Museum & Archives (Cayuga, Ontario) by St. Stephen's in 2006.

Father Brown was the maternal nephew of William Henry Moore MP for Stouffville, Ontario from 1930 to 1945. He was a descendant of Samuel Moore, a leader in the Quaker movement in Nova Scotia after the American Revolution, and a descendant of Samuel Moore, a leader in the early settlement of New Jersey in the 1660s.
