= Samuel Moore (Quaker leader) =

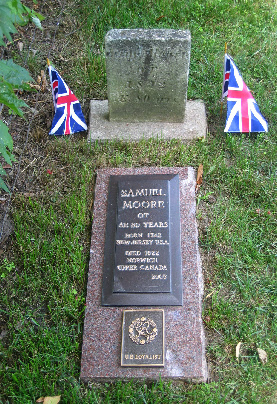
Old and new gravemarkers for Samuel Moore in the Quaker Burying Ground, Norwich, Ontario

Samuel Moore (1742–1822) is notable as a leader in the early establishment of the Religious Society of Friends (Quakers) in Maritime Canada, and as the progenitor of a number of civic, religious and political leaders in both Canada and the United States.

== Life ==
As a Quaker, Moore would not join the armed struggles during the American Revolution, and he was forced to leave his Woodbridge, New Jersey home, and flee to New York in 1777. In his deposition to the British-appointed Claims Commission in 1786 at Halifax, Nova Scotia, he testified that he had been imprisoned several times for refusing to assist the rebels. His house and land were confiscated in 1779, and with his wife and 9 children, he was evacuated by the British to Wilmot Township in Nova Scotia. Moore became a leader in the Quaker fellowship there.

The annalist, Ambrose Shotwell, verifies that Samuel was both a Loyalist and a Quaker: "Samuel, b. 4 April 1742, at Rahway, New Jersey; member of the M, M. for Rahway and Plainfield, by request, 16 of 11 mo. 1774; dwelt, before the Revolution, at Uniontown, 2 miles from Rahway, whence, having the reputation of being a Tory, he went, during the war, to New York, and at its close, like many others, he took refuge in Nova Scotia, his property near Rahway being confiscated; his family accompanied him excepting his son Elias and daughter Sarah. On 15 of 7 mo. 1802, he received a certificate of membership from R. & P. M. M., directed to Nantucket M. M., the few Friends in Nova Scotia being under the care of that meeting."

In 1786 and 1787, Samuel hosted his brother, Joseph, and his Quaker companions who had collected donations in the United States for the poor of Nova Scotia, Canada.

When Timothy Rogers, the entrepreneurial patriarch of the Rogers Communications family, was considering immigrating to British North America, he visited with Moore in 1795. Rogers records that Samuel Moore was "a Friend that lived in Wilmot in the County of Annapolis, that received us very kindly....I think we had hereway about 10 or 12 meetings." Rogers' journal preserves several letters between the two Friends. Rogers chose to emigrate to Upper Canada, rather than Nova Scotia, and founded the settlement that eventually became Pickering Village, Ontario.

When Joseph Hoag, the well-known Quaker preacher from New York and New England, visited the Canadian Maritimes in 1801 and 1802, he stayed with Moore's family, and took Samuel with him on his journeys. In his journal, Hoag recorded that Moore "made an agreeable companion." Between excursions, he stayed in the Moore home, and reported that the Quaker meetings "were held half the time at Samuel Moore's." Hoag recorded that when he became quite sick, he convalesced at the Moore home for the first three months of 1802, and "was brought near the grave" but did recover and returned to the United States on April 23 of that year.

Perhaps influenced by Timothy Rogers, Moore re-located his own family to Upper Canada just before the beginning of the War of 1812. His journey from Nova Scotia to Upper Canada took a detour to his old hometown in New Jersey. His wife, Rachel Stone died there, and one son, Lindley Murray, decided to stay in New Jersey. Samuel had sold considerable holdings in Nova Scotia, and was able to purchase about 10 farms across southwestern Upper Canada from St. Thomas to Simcoe, Ontario. He passed these onto his sons, including Elias who became the Member of the Legislative Assembly for Middlesex County in 1836.

Though Quakers and Loyalists, his family became active in the agitation against the Family Compact, a group of elite landholders in Upper Canada. A number of his sons, notably Enoch and John, and grandsons were arrested for their part in the Rebellions of 1837. "All did everything they could, short of taking up arms themselves, to aid the rebel cause, providing an example to rival the Malcolms, of a Loyalist family abetting rebellion."

When he died in 1822, Moore's grave was one of the first in the Quaker Burying Ground on the northwest edge of what is now Norwich, Ontario.

== Family ==
Moore was a direct descendant of Samuel Moore, one of the civil leaders in the early years of New Jersey. His brother, Joseph, was a Quaker minister who was part of a group sent to facilitate the peace treaty talks at Sandusky, Ohio in 1793 between the United States and the Western Confederacy.

After his own children, notable among his descendants are:

- the orthopedic surgeon and founder of the public parks system in Rochester N.Y., Edward Mott Moore;
- the Baptist church planter, James Beach Moore;
- a member of the House of Commons of Canada, William Henry Moore;
- founder of Central Baptist Seminary in Toronto, W. Gordon Brown; and,
- the Grammy Award-winning record producer, Peter J. Moore.
