= William Henry Moore (politician) =

Canadian politician and lawyer

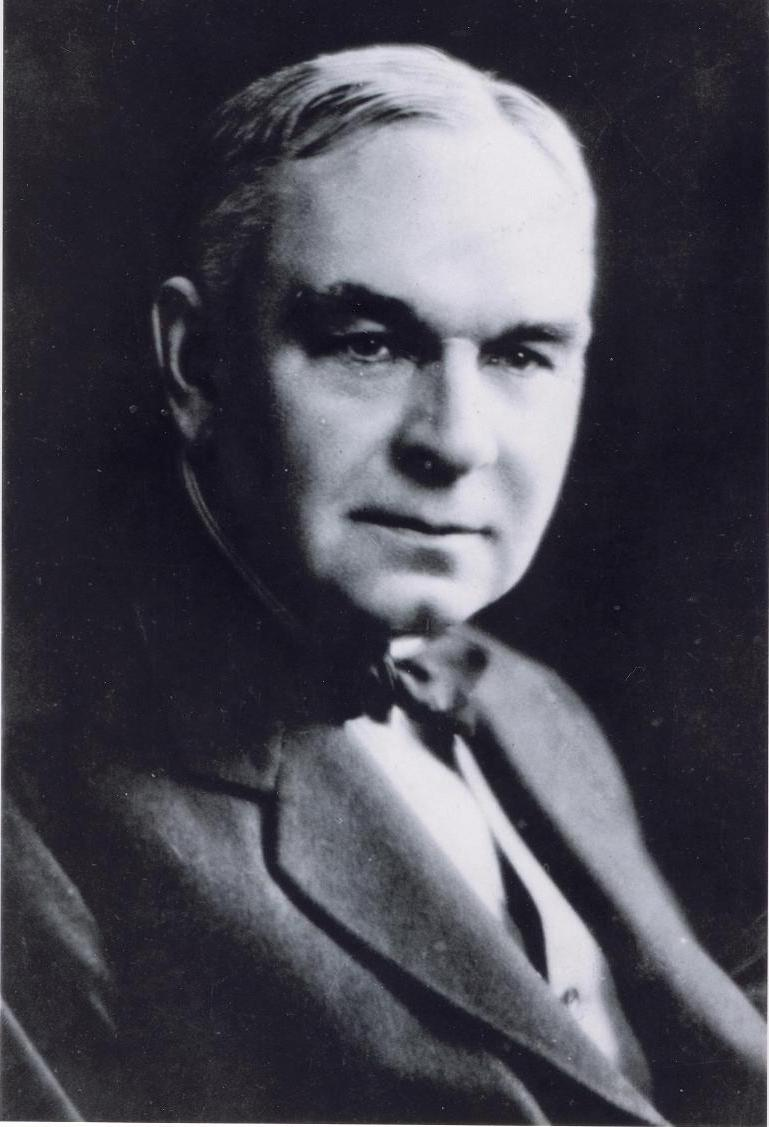

Member of Parliament for Ontario
- In office 1930–1945
- Preceded by: Thomas Erlin Kaiser
- Succeeded by: W. E. N. Sinclair

Personal details
- Born: October 19, 1872 Stouffville, Ontario, Canada
- Died: August 16, 1960 (aged 87) Pickering, Ontario, Canada
- Party: Liberal
- Spouse: Christine Mabel Bertram (m. 1898)
- Occupation: Lawyer

William Henry Moore (October 19, 1872 – August 16, 1960) was a Canadian lawyer, author and Member of the House of Commons of Canada.

== Biography ==
William Henry Moore was born in Stouffville, Markham Township, Ontario, on Oct 19 1872 to Rev. James Beach Moore and Hannah Elizabeth Greenwood. Moore was a direct descendant of Samuel Moore, an official in the 1670s in the American colony of East Jersey. He was also the great-great-grandson of Samuel Moore, a United Empire Loyalist and member of the Quaker movement, and the great-grand-nephew of three notable political leaders of the mid-1800s: Elias Moore, Reform M.P.P. during the Upper Canada Rebellion of 1837; Enoch Moore, who was convicted of high treason for his role in those same rebellions; and, Lindley Murray Moore, president of the Rochester N.Y. Anti-Slavery Society in 1838. He graduated in Arts at the University of Toronto in 1894 and went on to post graduate studies in political science. At the University of Toronto he was a member of the Alpha Delta Phi fraternity. While studying at Cornell Law School, he was admitted into one of the Greek letter organizations (fraternities). He then went to Osgoode Hall to study law. He married Christine Mabel Bertram in Toronto June 23, 1898 (daughter of George Hope Bertram, MP for Toronto Center).

In 1903, Moore was appointed assistant to the president of the Toronto Railway Company.

In 1913, Moore built a large stone house on the east side of the mouth of the Rouge River in what is now Toronto, Ontario. The property consisted of 175 acres that he had purchased from the original patentee, William Holmes. He called the estate Moorlands and it was kept in the family until the Metropolitan Toronto and Region Conservation Authority expropriated it in the 1960s. It was opened to the public as the Petticoat Creek Conservation Area in 1975.

Moore worked as a distinguished barrister in Toronto and became a King's Counsel. He became the secretary of the Canadian National Railway Company.

In 1922, Moore was awarded an honorary LL.D. by the University of Ottawa. Other awards included Doctor of Letters and Fellow of the Royal Statistical Society.

Moore was avidly interested in economics. In 1926, he was appointed chairman of the Tariff Board. In his diary entry of Saturday, October 26, 1929, then Prime Minister William Lyon Mackenzie King wrote that he was "much impressed with [Moore's] knowledge of the tariff situation, etc." Moore held that position until 1930, when he was elected to the House of Commons for the riding of Ontario. Later, he would be chairman of the House of Commons Banking and Trade Committee. The French-Canadian journalist, Léopold Richer wrote of him in this role:

One must see him in his role as the Chairman of the Banking and Trade Committee. Big and tall, a friendly giant, a thick trunk, sitting solidly in his chair, his legs stretched out, his arms on the armrests. His head gives the impression of solidity; without mincing his words, it doesn't matter who is speaking, or what they are saying, he will give them their turn. He smokes almost continuously, sitting back in his chair, his pipe held in an enormous fist. His face remains impassive, he leads his listeners a little at a time, with long pauses for their benefit, handling interruptions peacefully. Then, he quietly calls members back to order, gives his opinion, allows others a chance to counter him, assuring all a common measure of justice. After a long session, he rises from his chair, his back hunched, with a tired demeanour, and retreats to the library to escape the petty quarrels.

Moore served in Parliament until April 16, 1945.

He died August 16, 1960, at the age of 87.

At various times in his life, he was a director of Massey-Harris Co. Ltd., Canadian Colonial Airways Ltd., and Brazean Colliers Ltd.

== Contribution ==
According to Graham Fraser, Canada's sixth Commissioner of Official Languages, "William Moore was an improbable defender of French-language rights in Canada. He was, as he listed proudly in his biography, of United Empire Loyalist descent, and a farmer in Pickering, Ontario. ...In 1918, when World War I was still raging and in the aftermath of Regulation 17, which abolished French-language education in Ontario, Moore wrote a remarkable book entitled The Clash: A Study in Nationalities. In the book, he argued that British traditions called for bilingualism and inclusion, and shrewdly contrasted them with what he called the rigid Prussian approach."

Senator Léon Mercier Gouin described The Clash as an "unsurpassed study of my people" and endorsed Moore's definition of nationality:

1. Ethnical identity,

2. Identity of language,

3. The unity of religion,

4. Common economic interests,

5. Habitation subject to common geographical conditions,

6. Common history and traditions,

7. A uniform theory of government.

== Books ==
Moore was the author of numerous books on culture and economics including:

- Railway Nationalisation and the Average Citizen (1917)
- Railway Nationalisation and the Farmer (1917)
- The Irresponsible Five: A New Family Compact (1917)
- The Clash! A Study of Nationalities (a 1918 book on French/English relations in Canada)
- Polly Masson (1919)
- Commandments of Men (1925)
- Definite National Purpose (1933)
- Yellow Metal (1934)
- Underneath It All (1942)
- When the Iron is Hot (1943)
- Grey Days (1946)
- By Their Fruits (1949)
- MacKenzie King (undated, privately published).

== Articles ==
The Mackenzie I Knew, Saturday Night, 28 December 1923
