= W. Gordon Brown =

Canadian theologian (1904–1979)

William Gordon Brown (January 21, 1904 in Delhi, Ontario – July 16, 1979 while touring in Oxford, England) was notable as the founder of Central Baptist Seminary, the leading Canadian training school for evangelical Baptist ministers from 1949 to 1993 when it merged with London Baptist Seminary to form Heritage Theological Seminary.

== Background ==
Known as W. Gordon Brown, he was born into the home of the Baptist minister, Rev. William J. Hay Brown and Elizabeth Greenwood Moore. His maternal grandfather was also a Baptist minister, James Beach Moore. He was the great-great-grandson of Samuel Moore, a leader in the Quaker movement, and a direct descendant of Samuel Moore, an official in the American colony of East Jersey in the 1670s. His maternal uncle was William Henry Moore, Member of the Canadian House of Commons from 1930 to 1945.

His childhood home moved according to his father's changes of pulpits from their ancestral village of Brownsville, to Brantford to Hamilton to West Toronto, Ontario. He was ordained into the Baptist ministry in 1924.

His first administrative post in a seminary was Dean of Toronto Baptist Seminary and Bible College, the school that had been started in 1927 by Baptist Fundamentalist T.T. Shields after a Modernist professor had been hired at McMaster Divinity College. This post lasted until 1948 when he was dismissed by Shields for expressing more moderate positions, however it was perhaps the actions of a radical and no longer biblically-grounded Shields who often left rationality for fanaticism.

In 1949, Brown took 50 students and some faculty members from Toronto Baptist Seminary to start the Canadian Baptist Seminary (later Central Baptist Seminary). "Shields was outraged at what he saw to be a personal betrayal." However, he had the blessing of the Bible Baptist Union. Central Baptist Seminary would become the conservative Baptist seminary of choice in Ontario until it merged with London Baptist Bible College and Seminary to form Heritage Baptist College and Heritage Theological Seminary in 1993.

While Dean of Central Baptist Seminary, Brown also served as pastor of Runnymede Baptist Church in Toronto for 25 years. After that post, he served as an associate pastor of Forward Baptist Church, also in Toronto.

In all, Brown served his denomination for over 50 years. At his 50th anniversary celebration in 1974, over 100 telegrams and letters arrived from all over Canada. More than 500 people attended the service. "The general secretary of the Fellowship [of Evangelical Baptist Churches], Dr. J. M. Watt, presented Dr. Brown with an illuminated citation. The citation appropriately recognized his abilities and contributions as a scholar of the Scriptures, as an administrator of and a professor in theological institutions; as a leader in the Baptist cause; as a pastor with a warm love for souls; as a Christian gentleman who loves and lives Christ."

W. Gordon Brown also participated in the translation and editing of the original New International Version of the Bible (1973-1978) with the International Bible Society.

His peers in the Evangelical Theology Society commented on his passing by noting that "thousands of workers in mission fields in far-off continents and in flourishing centers in Canada received their best inspiration and preparation for service from him. What they received from him was not building material fragile and flimsy but material of stone and iron to construct temples for the soul."

Even though Brown was a third generation Baptist preacher, and a notable leader in a conservative branch of that denomination, his brother L. Douglas Brown served as an assistant priest at St. George's Anglican Church in Guelph, Ontario, and eventually converted to Roman Catholicism and was ordained in 1949 as a Roman Catholic priest. He pre-deceased W. Gordon in 1964 while serving in St. Stephen's parish in Cayuga, Ontario.
