= Abigail Mott =

American Quaker, abolitionist and women's rights activist

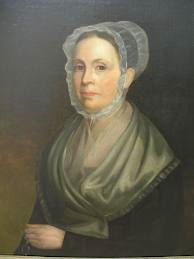
Abigail Lydia Mott Moore, oil painting, Livingston Backus House

Abigail Lydia Mott Moore, known professionally as Abigail Mott (August 6, 1795 – September 4, 1846), was an American Quaker, abolitionist and women's rights activist.

== Early life and education ==
Abigail Lydia Mott was born on August 6, 1795, in Cow Bay, Long Island, New York. She was the fifth of seven children by Adam and Ann Mott.

She attended the Nine Partners Boarding School in what is now Millbrook, Dutchess County, New York, which was started by her grandfather James Mott and run by the Society of Friends. Her brothers also attended the Nine Partners Boarding School. Abigail followed in the footsteps of her brothers and sisters in 1811 and became an assistant teacher at the Nine Partners Boarding School.

Abigail's brothers were James Mott, who was married to the Quaker reformer Lucretia Mott, and Richard Mott. Her uncle, Richard Mott, was a noted Quaker minister.

== Marriage and family ==
Mott married Lindley Murray Moore on August 19, 1813 and moved that year to Rahway, New Jersey. Their son Edward Mott Moore, who became a physician, was born on July 15, 1814, in Rahway, New Jersey. He died on March 3, 1902, in Rochester, New York. Gilbert Hicks Moore was born in 1816 and died in 1868. Their daughter Ann Mott Moore was born in 1818. Their son, Lindley Murray Moore Jr. died on December 31, 1846, of consumption.

After living and working in the New York City area, the Moores moved to Rochester, New York in 1830. The following year, they bought a farm and built a two-story Greek Revival style house on it. Moore and his wife were members of the Orthodox Farmington Quarterly Meeting by November 1836.

While teaching at the Boarding School, Abigail met and fell in love with fellow teacher, Lindley Murray Moore. The pair moved to Rahway, New Jersey to start up their own Quaker school and married in 1813. By November 1815, the couple relocated to New York and had their first child Edward Mott Moore. Abigail gave birth to eight children, however only five of her children lived past the age of three. Money troubles led Abigail and her family to relocate to Rochester. They built a two-story house and began a new life as farmers.

Raised as a Quaker, later in life she became a Unitarian. She was a friend of Susan B. Anthony and Mott's son, Dr. Edward Mott Moore was her physician.

== Educator ==
Mott and her husband, Lindley Murray Moore, operated a Quaker school in Rahway, New Jersey, for several years. In 1815, they operated a school on Pearl Street in New York City that was administered by the Friends Monthly Meeting. In the spring of 1821, they had opened a boarding school for boys in Flushing, (Note: They are also said to have opened the school in Flushing by 1820.) and in 1827 the school was moved to Westchester Village, New York. Lindley purchased a 170-acre farm in what is now Rochester, New York. In 1836, he sold his farm and then lost all of their property. He returned to teaching at the Rochester high school.

== Activist life ==
Abigail and her husband were both teachers at the Nine Partners Boarding School and they continued to teach after they left the school. In 1815, while in New York Abigail and her husband took charge of a school run by the Friends Monthly Meeting. By 1820, salary cuts forced Abigail and Lindley to move on and open a boarding school for boys first in Flushing, and then in Westchester Village, New York. By 1831, they chose to retire as teachers and start a new life as farmers. The extra time led the couple to get more involved in the anti-slavery movement. In 1836, Abigail participated in the Farmington Quarterly Meeting, along with her sister-in-law Lucretia Mott. The group had a strong abolitionist perspective and during that particular meeting Abigail was the signing clerk of the women's meeting. After an orphaned toddler was found wandering around Rochester, Abigail joined up with other women of Rochester and created the Rochester Orphan's Asylum in 1837. Abigail and Lindley, along with other abolitionist, founded one of Rochester's first anti-slavery societies, the Rochester Anti-Slavery Society, in 1838.

== Death ==
On September 4, 1846, Abigail Mott died from tuberculosis. Lindley retired about 1850, and went to live with his son, Edward Mott Moore in Rochester. Lindley died on August 14, 1871. At the time of his death, their daughter, Ann M. Haines of Buffalo, New York was alive.

== Published works ==
Mott wrote:

- Biographical Sketches and Interesting Anecdotes of Persons of Colour, M. Day, New York, 1826
- Observations on the Importance of Female Education, Mahlon Day, New York, 1827 — with James Mott
- Biographical Sketches and Interesting Anecdotes of Persons of Color, To Which Is Added, a Selection of Pieces in Poetry, Mahlon Day, New-York, 1837
- The mother and her children : or, Twilight conversation, Mahlon Day and Co., New York, 1841
- Narratives of Colored Americans, Academic Affairs Library, University of North Carolina at Chapel Hill, 1999

== Sources ==
- Haverford College Alumni Association (1892). A History of Haverford College for the First Sixty Years of Its Existence. Porter & Coates.
- Moore, Bob (2010). "Samuel Moore's Notable Sons" (PDF). Canadian Quaker Historic Journal. 75.
