= Hawtrey =

Hawtrey is a surname. Notable people with the surname include:

- Anthony Hawtrey (1909–1954), English actor and theatre director
- Edward Craven Hawtrey (1789–1862), English educationalist
- Charles Hawtrey (actor, born 1858) (1858–1923), British stage (and early silent film) actor, producer and theatre manager
- Charles Hawtrey (actor, born 1914) (1914–1988), British film and television actor, born George Hartree, best known for the Carry On films
- George Procter Hawtrey (1847–1910), British actor, playwright and pageantmaster
- Henry Hawtrey (1882–1961), British athlete
- John Hawtrey (1850–1925), English amateur footballer
- Kay Hawtrey (1926–2021), Canadian actress
- Kim Hawtrey, Australian economist
- Ralph George Hawtrey (1879–1975), British economist

== See also ==
- Hawtrey, Ontario for the community in Norwich, Ontario
- Hawtreys, independent boys' preparatory school
