= Joseph Moore (peace rider) =

American Quaker peace negotiator (1732–1793)

Joseph Moore (January 9, 1732 in Woodbridge, Middlesex, New Jersey – October 7, 1793 in Amwell, Hunterdon Co., NJ), was notable as a Quaker peace negotiator sent to the talks between Native leaders of the Western Confederacy and American government representatives at Sandusky, Ohio, in 1793. The issue was whether or not American settlers would be allowed to settle west of the Ohio River.

== Early life ==
Moore was the son of Samuel Moore and Mary Crowell. He is a direct descendant of Samuel Moore, a colonial official in early New Jersey. Though his father was a carpenter, he sent Joseph to be educated as a mariner. He only made one voyage and then settled into the role of miller.

Moore married Christiana Bishop, February 21, 1751 and became a member of Quaker Woodbridge, Rahway and Plainfield Monthly Meeting in September 1763. In 1766, he with his wife and children received a certificate of membership directed to Kingwood Monthly Meeting. He and his family settled at Amwell Township, New Jersey and over time, he was recognized for his gifts as a minister.

== War Tax Resister and Peace Rider ==
Quaker records show that he applied, in 1772, to hold a monthly meeting for Quaker fellowship in his house. The request was granted. By 1774, the neighbouring Kingwood Monthly Meeting lists him as a minister who frequently travelled abroad in Truth’s service.

Being a man of peace, Moore would not support the Revolutionary War against Great Britain. Early in the conflict, Kingsfield Monthly Meeting records show "our worth Friend Jos. Moore for refusing to take the Test of Allegiance to the State of N. Jersey so & Abjuring the King of G. Brittain (sic) was confined to Trenton Jail near Six Weeks and had the Test tender'd to him again by the Court but he refusing to comply was fined in the Sum of £50 & discharged from Confinement" upon surrendering two yoke of oxen and one mare worth £40. He was also assessed Militia Fines and Taxes which cost him another yoke of oxen, two cows, one mare and one colt. Later in the conflict, June 2, 1779, the same records show that "Wm Snook Constable came to Jos. Moore's house and took a Horse valued at £18 for refusing to pay a Tax levied to support a War against Great Britain by virtue of a Warrnt. from Abraham Prald, a Justice so called."

In 1783, Moore was a signatory to the Quaker Anti-Slavery Petition.

Moore's ministry was chiefly confined to local needs, until the year 1786, when he performed a religious visit, in company with Abraham Gibbons, to Nova Scotia. In the following year accompanied by William Wilson, of Philadelphia, he traveled a second time to Nova Scotia with a donation from Friends, to be distributed amongst the poor in that colony. Many of these poor would have been recently arrived United Empire Loyalists, like Moore’s brother, Samuel.

"About the year 1791 a misunderstanding existed between the United States and several of the Indian tribes. On this occasion the meeting for Sufferings, held in Philadelphia, addressed a memorial to Congress, the object of which was to show the expediency of pursuing pacific measures toward settling the disputes with the Indians. Their representation was well received, but the measures they recommended were not then adopted, and the calamities of war still continuing to prevail on the western frontiers of the States, the Yearly Meeting, held in 1792, appointed a large committee to unite with the meeting for Sufferings in deliberating on this momentous subject and if practicable to recommend such measures as would be most likely to promote peace and friendship with the Indians.

"Early in the year 1793 deputies from several Indian nations visited Philadelphia with a view of forwarding an accommodation of differences with the United States, and, Government having agreed that a treaty should be held in the Indian country, near Detroit, during the summer following— those Indian deputies repeatedly urged that some Friends should attend the negotiations, stating that the nations they represented had a special confidence in Friends as a people who, from their first settlement in America, had manifested a steady adherence to the maintenance of peace and friendship with the natives.

In accordance with the desire which Friends had long felt to promote peace, the proposal was acceded to, and six Friends were deputed to accompany the commissioners appointed by Government, on this occasion, after having obtained the President's approbation."

The journal of Joseph Moore's peace ride begins : " On the 17th of 4th mo. 1793, I set out for Philadelphia and attended the meeting for sufferings, where were divers Friends, who had given up to attend the Indian treaty proposed to be held at Sandusky, on the waters of Lake Erie—having previously obtained certificates from our several monthly meetings for that purpose. The commissioners appointed by Government are General Benjamin Lincoln, Colonel Timothy Pickering, and Beverly Randolph. Lincoln goes by water to Albany, &c.; William Savery, Jacob Lindley, [of Chester Co., Pa.], and William Hartshorn go with him, and John Parish, John Elliott and myself, with Timothy Pickering and Beverly Randolph, go through the country by land."

The talks did not go well. The Native leaders felt emboldened by major victories over the United States in 1790 and 1791. They were suspicious that the talks were not being held in good faith, and some of them were accordingly hostile. Their misgivings were justified in that General "Mad Anthony" Wayne was training an army of more than 4,600 troops at the same time. The American government representatives were reluctant to attend the talks for fear of their safety. Eventually, the efforts failed and the Quaker peace riders returned to Philadelphia to report at the Yearly Meeting. Hostilities followed the failed talks, the American government won a decisive victory in the Battle of Fallen Timbers in August 1794, and the wholesale settlement of the Ohio Territory ensued.

== Death ==
Moore died on October 6, 1793, of yellow fever contracted while attending Philadelphia Yearly Meeting, at the close of a very wearisome journey to Detroit.

"Moore was buried on his plantation in Amwell; the neighbors were so fearful of the disease that not one of them dared venture near the house. An undertaker in the neighborhood made a coffin and left it in sight of the house to be taken away by some of the family. Joseph's two daughters with the aid of a colored man prepared and buried the remains, one neighbor at the last coming forward to render some assistance."
