= James Mott =

American activist (1788–1868)

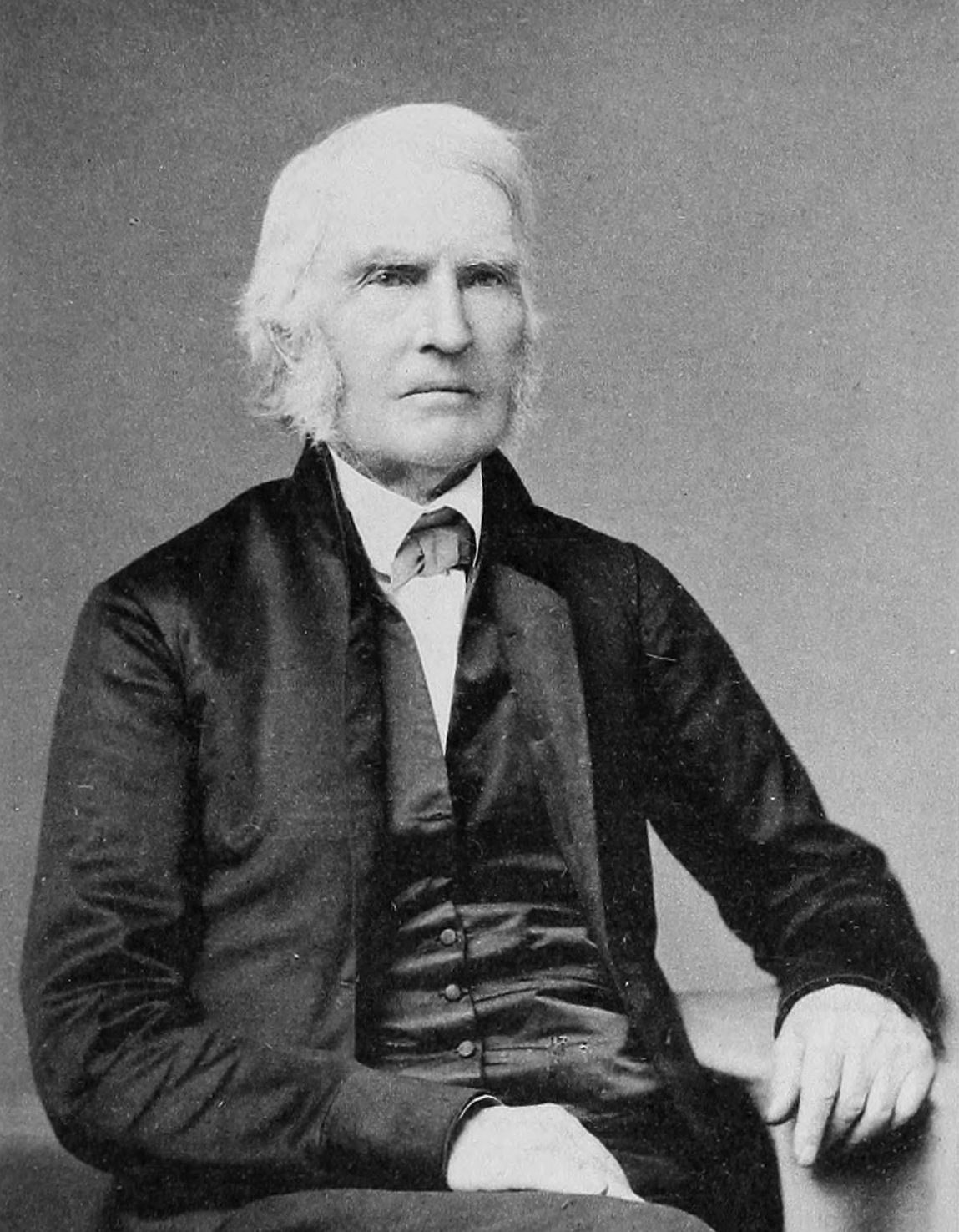
- Born: June 20, 1788; North Hempstead, New York, US
- Died: January 26, 1868 (aged 79); New York City, US
- Occupation: Merchant
- Known for: Abolitionist, work on the Underground Railroad
- Spouse: Lucretia Mott (m. 1811)
- Relatives: Richard Mott (brother); Abigail Lydia Mott (sister); Lindley Murray Moore (brother-in-law)

James Mott (June 20, 1788 – January 26, 1868) was a Quaker leader, teacher, merchant, and anti-slavery activist. He was married to suffragist leader Lucretia Mott. Like her, he wanted enslaved people to be freed. He helped found anti-slavery organizations, participated in the "free-produce movement", and operated an Underground Railroad depot with their family. The Motts concealed Henry "Box" Brown after he had been shipped from Richmond, Virginia in a crate. Mott also supported women's rights, chairing the Seneca Falls Convention in 1848. He spent four years supporting the establishment of Swarthmore College.

== Early life ==
James was born in Cow Neck (now North Hempstead) on Long Island, New York to a Quaker family. His parents Anne (née Mott) and Adam Mott, distant cousins, descended from English Quakers who immigrated to the Thirteen Colonies in the 17th century. Adam was a miller, farmer, and superintendent of the Quaker Nine Partners School in Poughkeepsie, Dutchess County, New York.

Mott's sister, Abigail Lydia Mott, and brother-in-law, Lindley Murray Moore were instrumental in founding the Rochester Anti-Slavery Society in 1838. His brother, Richard Mott, was elected as an Opposition Party candidate to the Thirty-fourth and reelected as a Republican to the Thirty-fifth Congresses (March 4, 1855 - March 3, 1859).

== Marriage and children ==
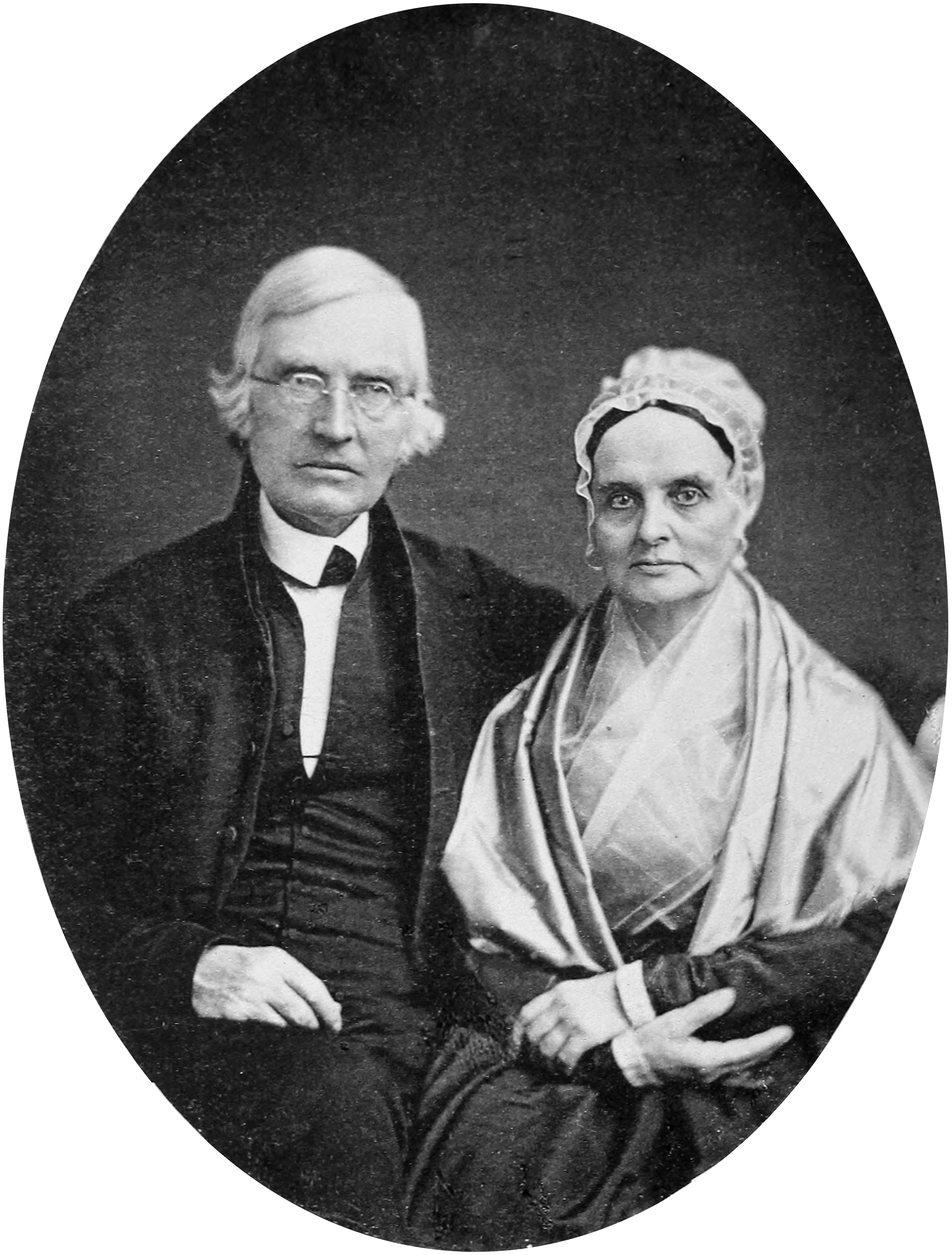
James and Lucretia Mott

Mott was a teacher at Nine Partners School, where he met Lucretia Coffin. After she graduated there, Lucretia became a teacher, too. After the Coffin family moved to Philadelphia, Mott and Lucretia followed in 1810.

Mott married Lucretia on April 10, 1811, at Pine Street Meeting in Philadelphia. They had six children, five of whom made it to adulthood. He was a member of the Philadelphia Yearly Meeting. Mott and his wife shared anti-slavery interests, supported women's rights, and helped found Swarthmore College.

Mott died of pneumonia on January 26, 1868, while he and Lucretia visited their daughter and son-in-law George W. Lord in Brooklyn, New York.

== Career ==
After teaching at the Nine Partners Boarding School, Mott became a merchant in Philadelphia, working as a partner in Lucretia's father's nail business.

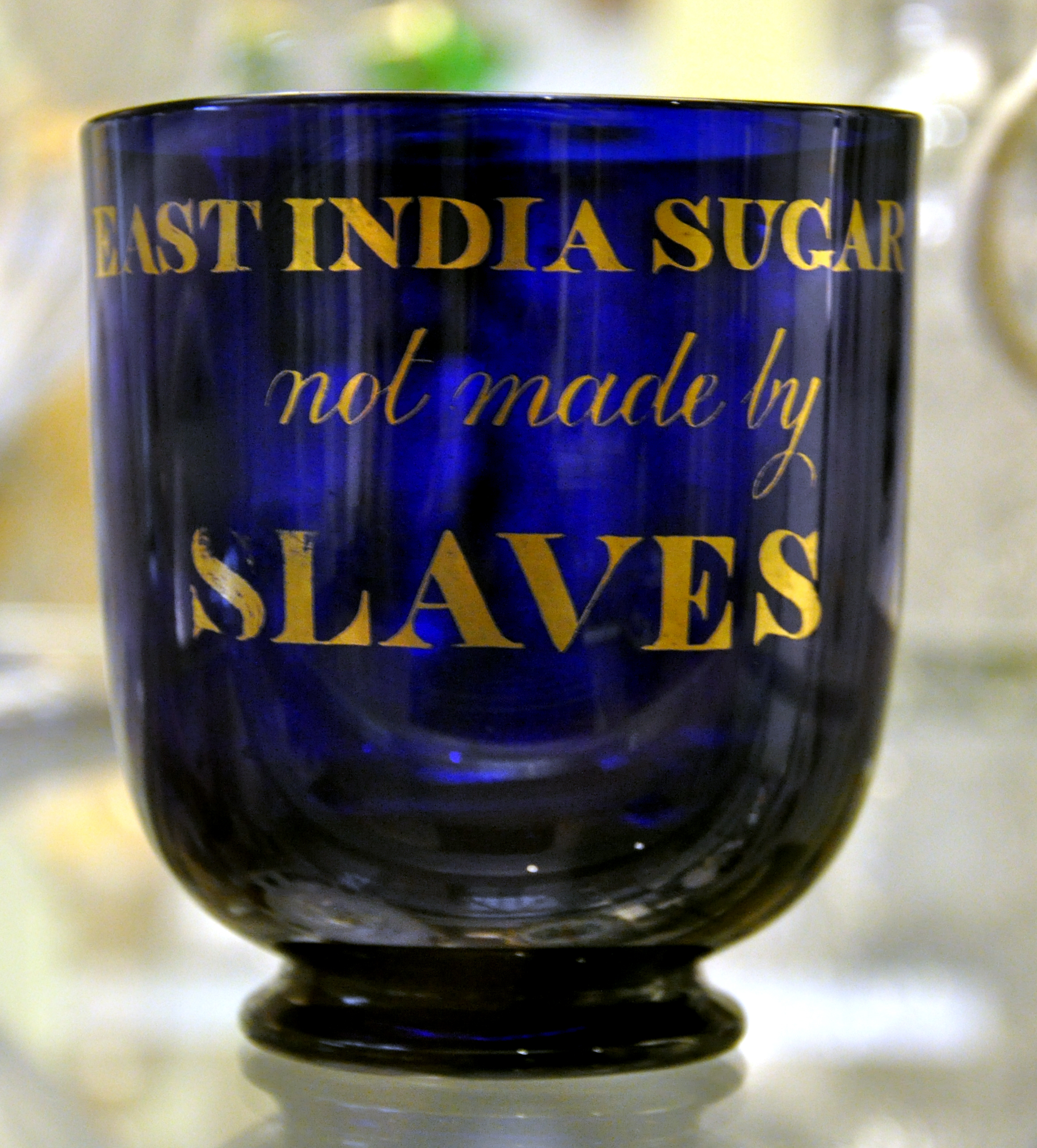
Glass sugar bowl with the message "East India Sugar not made by slaves"

The Motts, seeking to make slavery unprofitable, boycotted products made by enslaved people. They formed a free-produce society that banned the purchase of cotton, molasses, rice, tobacco, and other relevant products. Mott weathered the difficult years of the War of 1812 and the Panic of 1819, after which he became a textile merchant in 1822. He began by dealing in cotton, but like other people who had become Hickite Quakers, he hated that cotton was produced by enslaved people. Following the call to only deal in free produce, he began selling free cotton by 1829 and then by 1830 sold only wool, which was produced without the labor of slaves.

== Abolitionist ==
Mott was one of the first people to support William Lloyd Garrison. In 1833, he was a member of the American Anti-Slavery Society. The same year, he was one of the founders of the Philadelphia Anti-Slavery Society, and Lucretia attended as a guest. He helped found the Pennsylvania Anti-Slavery Society with Lucretia and he was the president of the organization for several years. In 1840, Mott and his wife were delegates of the World's Anti-Slavery Convention in London, which decided they would not admit women to the proceedings. He was part of the "agitation" to admit women delegates. In 1841, he published Three Months in Great Britain, an account of the journey he took with Lucretia to attend the London convention.

Frederick Douglass attended an anti-slavery meeting in Norristown, Pennsylvania at the First Baptist Church in 1842. People in the sanctuary were hit by stones thrown by pro-slavery rioters. Mott was threatened by the mob until freedmen and abolitionists got the better of the situation.

The Christiana Riot erupted on September 11, 1851, which resulted in the death of Edward Gorsuch, a slaveholder from Maryland. A trial was held in November of that year at Independence Hall in Philadelphia. Judge Robert C. Grier stated, "The guilt of this foul murder rests not alone on the deluded individuals who were its immediate perpetrators, but the blood taints with even deeper dye the skirts of those who promulgated doctrines subversive of all morality and all government," which implicated James Mott and Thaddeus Stevens, a defense attorney. Lucretia attended the trial, during which she knitted in red, white, and blue yarn, "display[ing] cool abolitionist sentiment."

The Harrisburg Telegraph said Mott was an "inveterate enemy of American slavery" in his obituary.

== Underground Railroad ==
Like his paternal grandparents Mary Underhill and James Mott, and his Underhill great-grandparents, Mott helped Black people escape slavery. His grandparents helped people who arrived at Hempstead Harbor, Long Island, near a boat landing site near their home and provided transportation to New Rochelle, New York. Mott's elders helped formerly enslaved people before the Underground Railroad was established.

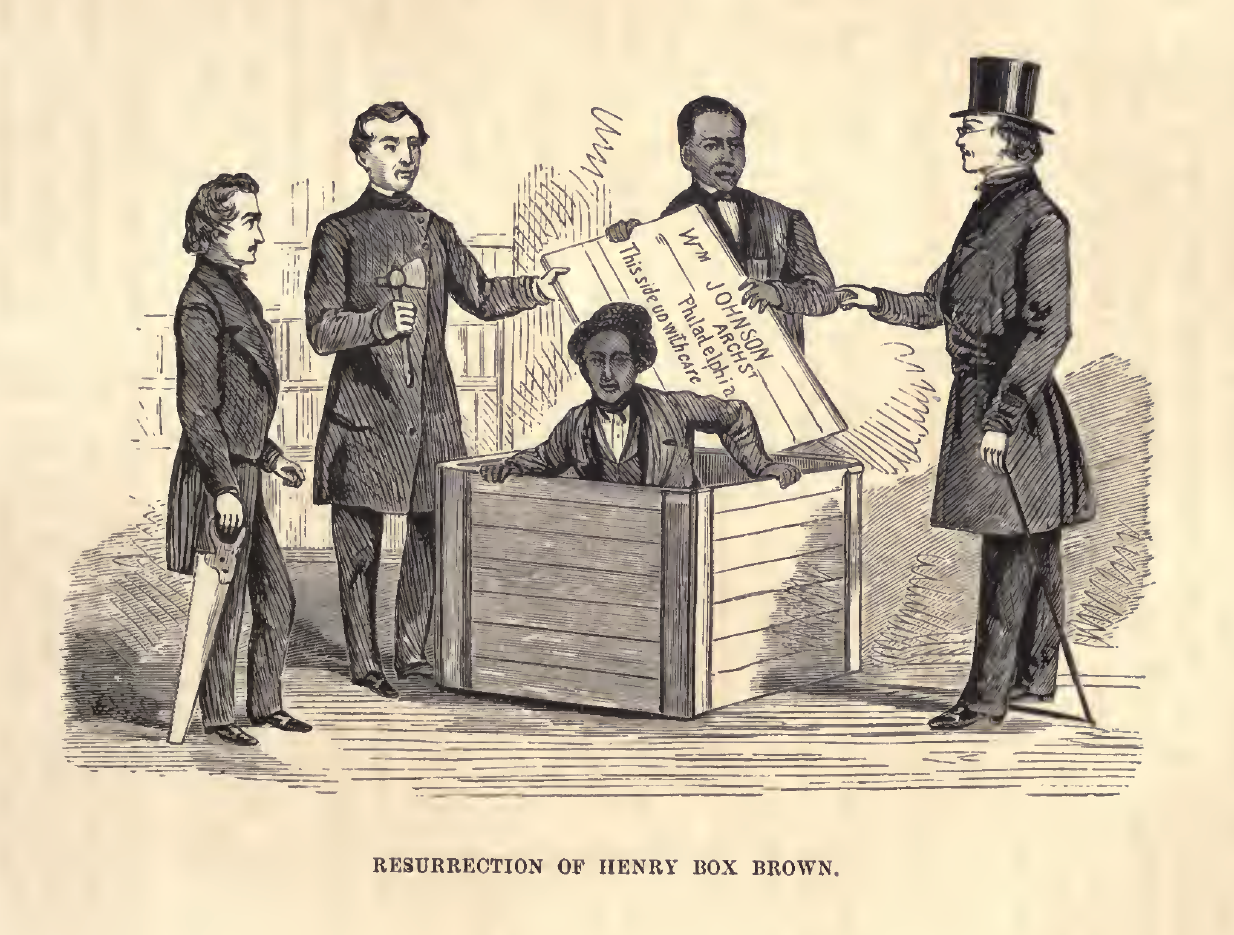
Another "Resurrection of Henry Box Brown" published with an account of the story in William Still's 1872 book The Underground Railroad

James Mott, operated an Underground Railroad depot at their house at 338 Arch Street in Philadelphia, Pennsylvania with the help of his family members. People that came through the Mott house were also aided on their journey by Isaac Hopper and Hannah Cox. He aided and his family aided Henry "Box" Brown in 1849. Brown was packed in a wooden crate and was sent from Richmond, Virginia to Philadelphia, after which the Motts concealed Brown for his safety.

Passmore Williamson, an attorney, helped Jane Johnson attain her freedom from her slaveholder, John Hill Wheeler of North Carolina. A trial was held in Philadelphia against Williamson on August 29, 1855. Mott, Reverend James Miller McKim, and an agent escorted Johnson to the trial so that she could testify.

== Women's rights ==
James chaired the Seneca Falls Convention, the first women's rights convention, held in Seneca Falls, New York in 1848 on July 19 and 20 at which his wife was the main speaker. He was the only male to have chaired a women's rights convention.

== Swarthmore College ==
From 1865 to 1869, Mott helped found Swarthmore College in Pennsylvania. It was one of the first coeducational colleges in the United States.

== Sources ==
- Faulkner, Carol (May 10, 2011). Lucretia Mott's Heresy: Abolition and Women's Rights in Nineteenth-Century America. University of Pennsylvania Press. ISBN 978-0-8122-0500-8.
- Snodgrass, Mary Ellen (2008). The Underground Railroad : an encyclopedia of people, places, and operations. Armonk, N.Y. : M.E. Sharpe. ISBN 978-0-7656-8093-8.
