= Edward Mott Moore =

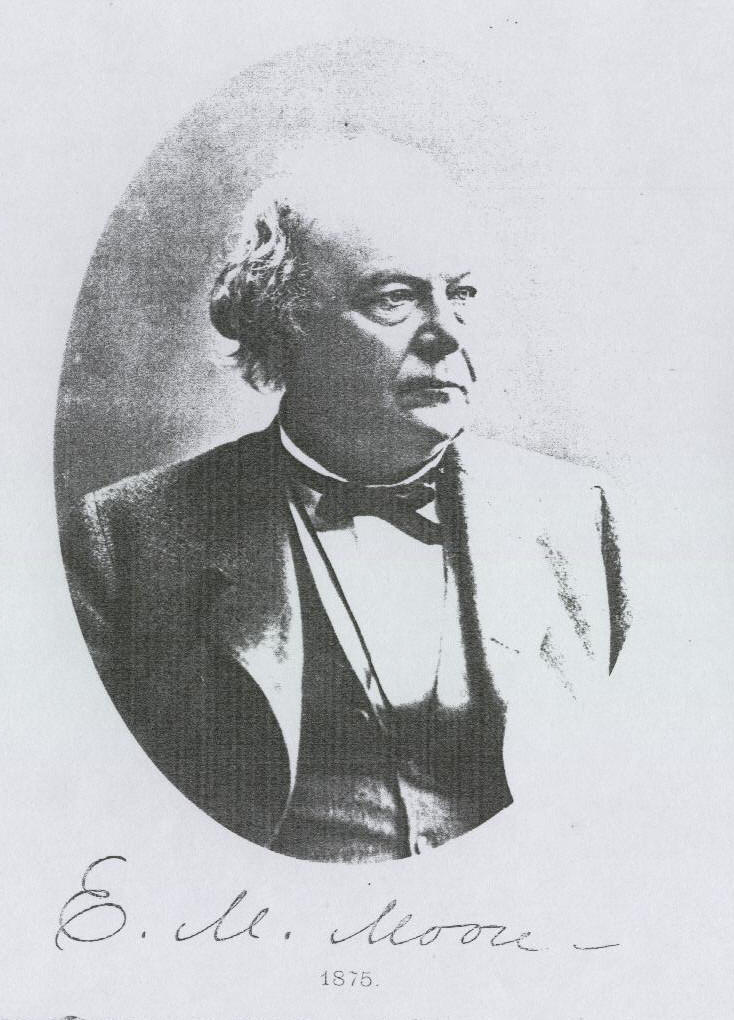

Edward Mott Moore (1814–1902) was an American surgeon. He served as president of the American Medical Association and as president of the Board of Trustees of the University of Rochester. One type of radial fracture is named for him.

== Biography ==
Moore was born in Rahway, New Jersey to Lindley Murray Moore and Abigail Mott, abolitionists, educators, and women's rights activists, of Quaker and Huguenot descent. His mother's sister-in-law was Lucretia Coffin Mott, the abolitionist and pioneer of the civil rights movement in the United States. His maternal uncle was Richard Mott who was elected to the Thirty-fourth and the Thirty-fifth Congresses. His paternal uncle was Elias Moore, who was elected to the Twelfth and Thirteenth Parliaments of Upper Canada. In 1847, Edward married Lucy Prescott of Windsor, Vermont. They were active in St. Luke's Episcopal Church, Rochester, New York.

He received his medical education in New York City and in Philadelphia (MD, University of Pennsylvania, 1838). His family had settled in Rochester, New York, and it was there that he made his permanent residence. With the title of professor of surgery, he gave lectures at medical colleges – at Woodstock, Vermont (1842–1854), at Berkshire, Massachusetts (1855), at Starling Medical College (the predecessor of The Ohio State University College of Medicine), Columbus, Ohio (1857), and at Buffalo Medical College (1859–83). He was president of the Medical Society of the State of New York (1874), of which society he was one of the founders, of the American Surgical Association (1883), and of the American Medical Association (1890).

For many years he was president of the board of trustees of the University of Rochester, and he is remembered as the "father" of the Rochester park system. In 1883, two great nurserymen, George Ellwanger and Patrick Barry, offered 19 hilltop acres of their nursery grounds to the City of Rochester for a memorial park. The city officials at the time refused the offer, but by 1888 Bishop Bernard McQuaid, Dr. Moore, and Councilman George W. Elliot persuaded them to accept the land and establish the Rochester Park Commission. Moore became the first president of the commission. The commission's next big decision was to hire Frederick Law Olmsted, the pioneer of American landscape architecture, to design a system of parks along the waterways in Rochester.

A large statue was placed in Genesee Valley Park in his honor. “At dedication ceremonies held October 19, 1927, Dr. George W. Goler delivered an address, portions of which are interesting in describing Dr. Moore as a physician and as a man. 'He was never a money-getter. Notwithstanding his great physique he was as delicately organized and as tender as a child. He avoided pain wherever and whenever possible. He never spared himself. In the early period of his Rochester career, when roads were bad and the income meager, he would frequently ride on horseback a distance of eighteen or twenty miles and back to make a single visit or perform a surgical operation. He had a dignified, even a majestic presence. He was simple of manner and easy of approach. His appearance in the sick room, where the patient was in pain and the family in tears, seldom failed to bring that calm which denoted the presence of a great physician. He relied more upon his powers of simple exposition and encouragement than he did upon the use of drugs. Not only as a practitioner but as a consultant was his opinion sought both in this as well as neighboring states'.”

The Monroe County Medical Society presents the Edward Mott Moore Award to a physician and to a layperson whose lives reflect the qualities embodied by Moore.

== Eponymous ailment ==
Moore's fracture – fracture of the lower end of the radius with dislocation of the head of the ulna and imprisonment of the styloid process beneath the annular ligaments. (The American Illustrated Medical Dictionary, 1938)
