= Kim Hawtrey =

Australian economist

Kim Hawtrey is an Australian economist, who has written on economics and on Christianity.

== Biography ==
He earned his doctorate at the University of New South Wales and studied at Moore Theological College. He has been Economist with the Reserve Bank of Australia, Chief Economist at Colonial State Bank, and a professor at Macquarie University in Sydney and Hope College in the United States.

He is a Fellow of Macquarie University and a Senior Fellow of the FINSIA Financial Services Institute of Australia.

== Publications ==
- K. Hawtrey, 2009, Affordable Housing Finance, Studies in Banking and Finance Institutions Series, London: Palgrave Macmillan (ISBN 978 0 230 55518 1)
- J. Juttner and K. Hawtrey, 1997, Financial Markets, Money and Risk, Addison -Wesley Longman: Melbourne (ISBN 0 582 80650 X)
- K. Hawtrey, 1991, Life After Debt, Albatross Books: Sutherland (ISBN 0 86760 136 1)
