= Charles Hawtrey =

Charles Hawtrey may refer to:

- Charles Hawtrey (actor, born 1858) (1858–1923), British stage (and early silent film) actor, producer and theatre manager
- Charles Hawtrey (actor, born 1914) (1914–1988), British film and television actor, born George Hartree, best known for the Carry On films
