= John Moore House (Sparta, Ontario) =

Coordinates: 42.7025°N 81.0795°W

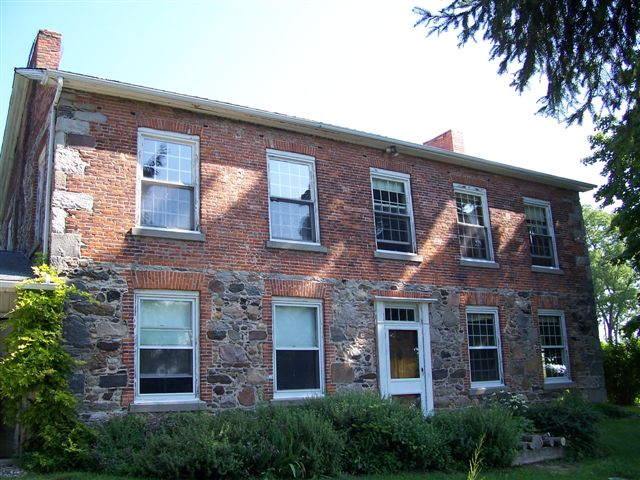
John Moore House, Sparta, ON

John Moore House is a pioneer home built in 1824 north of the village of Sparta, Ontario on land inherited from the builder's father, Samuel Moore U.E. It is considered a good example of pioneer architecture and construction in Elgin County, and a valuable relic of early settlement days in Southwestern Ontario, if not in the province.

It is an example of Georgian architecture, a two-storey structure of stone and brick, it features a symmetrical five bay front façade with a central door and two sets of flanking windows on the main floor, and five on the second storey.

Fieldstone chimneys rise from the end gables and connect to fireplaces on each floor. This house, "similar to many early Quaker homes in the Township of Norwich, was built into the side of a hill to accommodate a basement kitchen. This feature provided more space in an otherwise small home and was suitable for baking in the heat of the summer as well as the chill of winter."

With the house built into the Sparta moraine, the back of the second storey opens to the ground level. Local legend has it that this feature allowed one of the rebels of the Rebellions of 1837 to escape pursuing Loyalist forces.

Whether or not that story is true, it is documented that John Moore, though a United Empire Loyalist and a Quaker, became a leading advocate of reform in the turbulent 1830s, and was charged with treason in the aftermath of the failed rebellion. John’s son, Joseph, was also arrested and died in prison from an infection related to the squalid living conditions. John was released and continued on as a prominent farmer in the Yarmouth Township area. One brother Elias Moore was the area MPP in the 12th Parliament of Upper Canada and the 13th Parliament of Upper Canada. A third brother, Enoch, was also sentenced to hang for his part in the rebellions.

Around this same time, John's younger brother, Lindley Murray Moore was founding an Anti-Slavery Society in Rochester, N.Y..

The bricks used in the John Moore house were made on his farm, one of the five springs there supplying water to form a shallow pool, where oxen trod the clay to proper consistency to use as mortar for the walls and foundations. Lime was secured by burning stopes found on the hillside, and it is more than probable that John Moore was the first to use Elgin lime for building purposes. The size, shape and pale strawberry tint, prove beyond doubt the old hand-made brick, so easily distinguished from the later product of brickyards of larger size and deeper red as to colour. The stones used in combination with bricks were gathered from the farm, and the solid face this old home presents to the world today makes this an outstanding example of the skills and determination of Ontario's early pioneers.
