= Richard Mott (politician) =

American politician

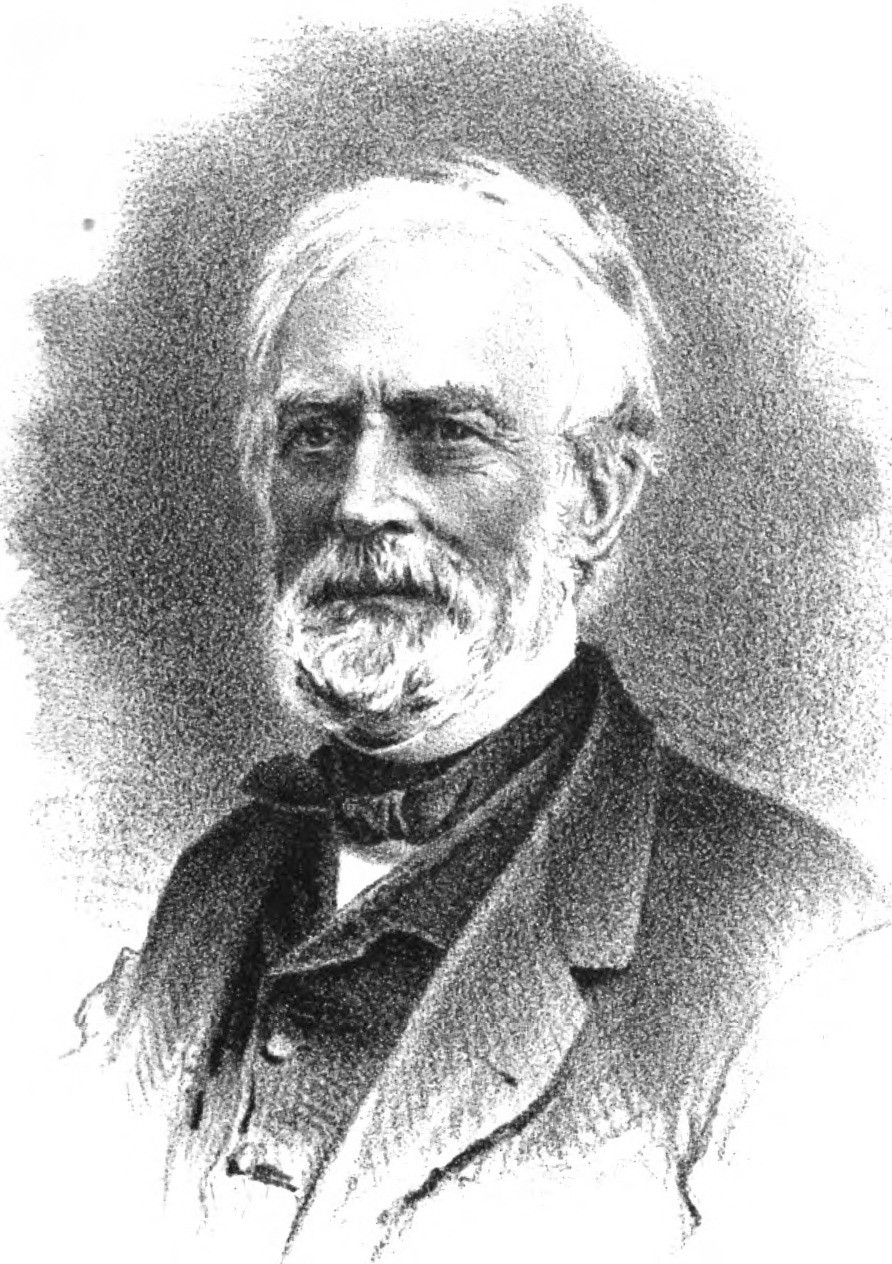
- circa 1872

Member of the U.S. House of Representatives from Ohio's 5th district
- In office March 4, 1855 – March 3, 1859
- Preceded by: Alfred Edgerton
- Succeeded by: James Mitchell Ashley

6th Mayor of Toledo, Ohio
- In office 1845–1846
- Preceded by: George B. Way
- Succeeded by: Emery D. Potter

Personal details
- Born: Richard Mott; July 21, 1804 Mamaroneck, New York, US
- Died: January 22, 1888 (aged 83) Toledo, Ohio, US
- Resting place: Mount Hope Cemetery Rochester, New York
- Party: Anti-Nebraska, Republican
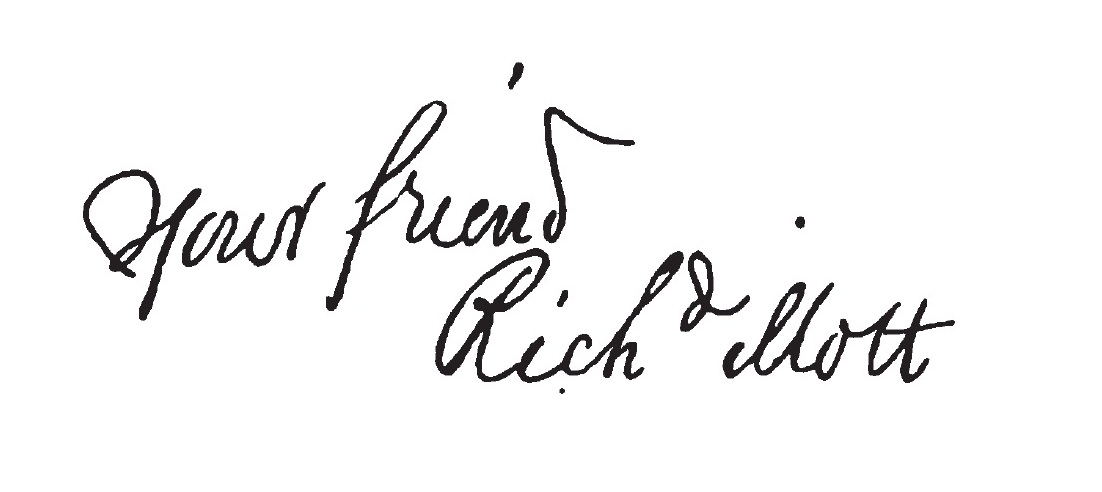
- Signature

Richard Mott (July 21, 1804 – January 22, 1888) was an American businessman and politician who served as mayor of Toledo, Ohio and as a two-term U.S. representative from Ohio from 1855 to 1859.

== Biography ==
Born to Quaker parents in Mamaroneck, New York, Mott attended a Quaker boarding school and seminary in Dutchess County, New York.

=== Business career ===
In 1815, he moved with his parents to New York City, in 1818 became a clerk in a store, and in 1824 engaged in banking. He moved to Toledo, Ohio, in 1836 and engaged in the real estate business and other enterprises. He assisted in building the first railroad west of Utica, from Toledo to Adrian, and served as mayor of Toledo in 1845 and 1846.

=== Congress ===
Mott was a Democrat in politics until 1848, when he entered actively into the antislavery movement. He was elected as an Anti-Nebraska candidate to the Thirty-fourth, and reelected as a Republican to the Thirty-fifth Congresses (March 4, 1855 – March 3, 1859). He was not a candidate for renomination in 1858. He returned to Toledo, and engaged in banking and the real estate business. He served as chairman of the citizens' military committee during the Civil War. Mott was also an advocate of woman suffrage.

=== Death ===
He died in Toledo on January 22, 1888. He was interred in Mount Hope Cemetery in Rochester, New York.

== Family ==
He was the brother of James Mott and brother-in-law of the American female agitator, Lucretia Mott and brother-in-law to abolitionist Lindley Murray Moore.

== Notes ==
U.S. House of Representatives
Preceded by Alfred Edgerton	Member of the U.S. House of Representatives from Ohio's 5th congressional district 1855–1859	Succeeded by James M. Ashley
