= Elias Moore =

Canadian politician (1776–1847)

Elias Moore (March 1, 1776 – October 13, 1847) was a Loyalist politician in Upper Canada. Born into a Quaker family in New Jersey just after the American Revolution began, he and his family eventually emigrated to Upper Canada. He later became a member of the Legislative Assembly of Upper Canada, and he is notable for being one of the first Quakers to take an elected seat in Canada.

His family was traumatised "by the persecution Quakers suffered for their neutral stand during the American Revolution," and they soon moved to a Loyalist refugee camp in New York City. They then evacuated about 1784, to the Annapolis Valley in Nova Scotia where his father, Samuel, became a leader in the Quaker Community.

As a young adult, Moore returned to his home state of New Jersey, and his family followed later. His family had deep roots there, an ancestor, Samuel Moore having held many offices in the early colony of East Jersey right after it had been settled in the 1660s.

In 1811, James Brown drove a team to take Moore, his wife and five children, from Elizabethtown, New Jersey, to the County of Norfolk, in Upper Canada. There were three other teams, and Brown reportedly led the van through the Grand River Swamp, the first team that ever went through after the brush was cleared away. The party reached Norfolk County in July.

Moore was farming in the township of Norwich until 1818, when he moved with James Brown to Yarmouth, then in the County of Middlesex, now Elgin. Brown later became the first mayor of Kincardine, Ontario. While living in Norwich, Elias assisted Peter Lossing to assemble details for Gourlay's Statistical Account of Upper Canada, which was published in 1822.

The Yarmouth Friends soon applied to the Norwich monthly meeting to be allowed to establish a preparatory meeting. On First Days, Friends met alternately at the houses of John Kipp and Moore. Similarly, the first temperance lecture in the Yarmouth district is said to have been given in Moore's home by David Burgess, a neighbour, and founder of the Methodist congregation at Union, Ontario. Moore was instrumental in building the first meeting house of the Yarmouth Friends, and sat on the committee charged with establishing a school in the community.

In 1834, Moore and Thomas Parke, a Wesleyan Methodist from London, won the two seats in the Middlesex riding for the Reformers in the 12th Parliament of Upper Canada. Moore was one of the first Quakers in the Canada to take a seat in an elected house of government. Before 1833, Quakers were not allowed to hold office because they would not swear the oath required by law from elected members before they could take their seats. In 1833, the British Parliament passed an act that also applied to the colonies and that accepted affirmations in lieu of oaths. Then living west of Sparta, Moore stood again as a Reform candidate in the crucial election of 1836, as did Parke. Both retained their seats, in the last Parliament of Upper Canada, but the Tories returned to power nevertheless.

Groups of radicals met in Sparta in September 1837, and prepared to assist a rebellion should one occur. Some 50 men left Yarmouth to assist the western rebels who were gathered at the village of Scotland in present-day Brant County. But the rebellion miscarried when the rebels disbanded and fled. Many were arrested and rewards were offered for the capture of their leader Dr. Charles Duncombe, plus David Anderson, Joshua Doan and others. Some of the suspects from the Sparta area, George Lawton, Dr. John T. Wilson, Joshua and Joel Doan, escaped to the United States. Joshua Doan was captured after engaging in a foolhardy attack against the village of Windsor in December 1838. Along with other exiles captured in the raid, Doan was tried, found guilty, and hanged. A memorial plaque at the edge of the Friends' Cemetery on the west of Sparta village recalls Doan's fate. Moore was also arrested for treason but, as the witness absconded, he was not tried. His brothers, John and Enoch, were retained in jail and convicted of treason. One of Elias' nephews died in captivity. (See John Moore House and Enoch Moore (Loyalist turned rebel)).

Around this same time, Elias's younger brother, Lindley Murray Moore was founding an Anti-Slavery Society in Rochester, N.Y..

Moore continued to serve in the 13th Parliament of Upper Canada until it was prorogued in February, 1840. His seat-mate, Thomas Parke, was elected to the new Legislative Assembly of the Province of Canada in 1841. "His party came into power and Mr. Parke was appointed Surveyor-General." He became embroiled in a debate over patronage and was forced to run as an independent in the next election in which he could only gather 46 votes out of a total of 2039. He did manage to split the Liberal vote, and the Conservative candidate, Edward Ermatinger, won the seat.

Up until his death, Moore served as clergy reserve inspector, helping to implement one of the post-rebellion recommendations of Lord Durham, that land set aside for the Church of England be sold off, as no other denomination had been granted land. The abuse, by the Family Compact, of clergy reserves and the income from them had been one of the sorest points for inciting the rebellions.

Moore's granddaughter, Isabella Sprague, married Thomas Scatcherd, who sat in the Province of Canada Legislative Assembly for West Middlesex, beginning in 1861.
