= Enoch Moore (loyalist turned rebel) =

Canadian politician

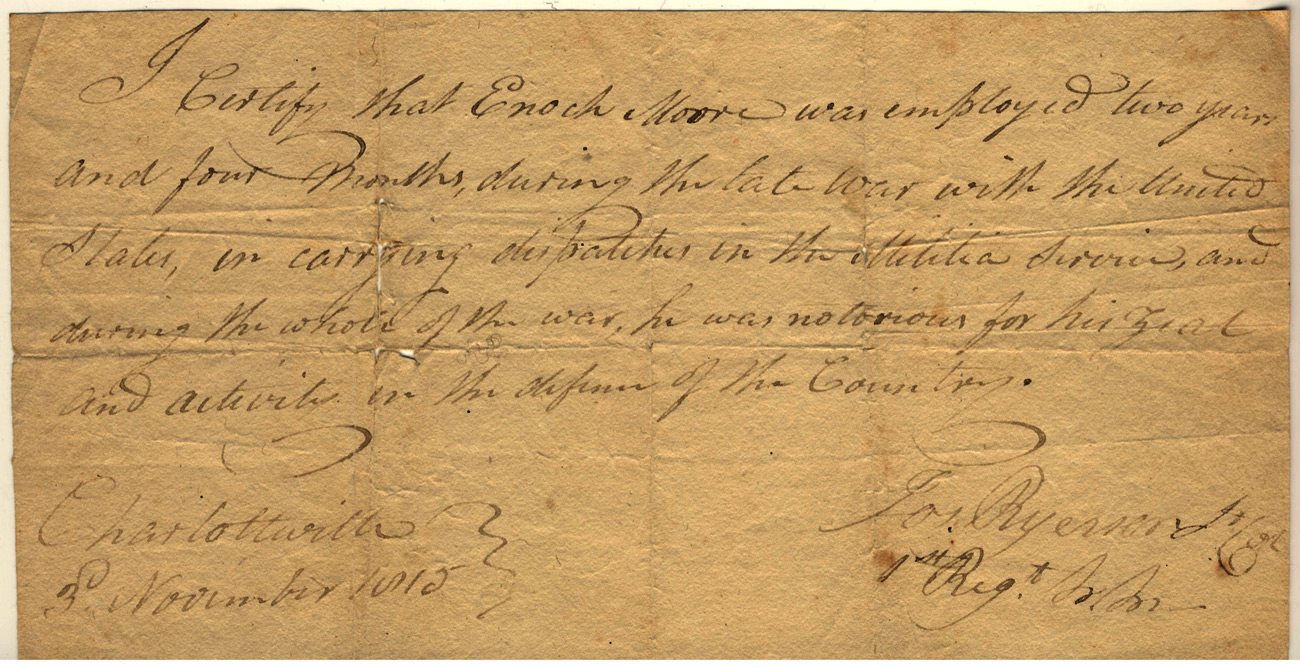

Enoch Moore (April 16, 1779– August 1841) was involved in political matters in British North America, and was convicted of high treason and sentenced to hang. His sentence was first commuted to transport to Van Diemen's Land, and then to parole. He eventually returned to, and died in, the United States of America.

Moore was the son of Samuel Moore U.E. and Rachel Stone, married Elizabeth Smith, daughter of James Smith and Hannah Hawksworth, on March 30, 1803, in Old Holy Trinity Church, Lower Middleton, Annapolis County, Nova Scotia.

Moore's political alignment seemed to swing from one extreme to the other throughout his lifetime. He was born in a Loyalist refugee camp in New York City and was evacuated with his Quaker family, about 1784, to the Annapolis Valley, Nova Scotia where his father, Samuel Moore, became a leader in the Quaker community. He moved to Upper Canada about 1811, where he served as a dispatch rider in the Canadian militia during the War of 1812 against the Americans. His commanding officer was Col. Joseph Ryerson. By 1830, Enoch Moore had gained the status of school trustee. One of the teachers in his employ was Egerton Ryerson son of Col. Joseph Ryerson, who became the founder of the public school system in Ontario. Moore's first son, James Moore, was buried beside Col. Joseph Ryerson in the Methodist cemetery in Woodhouse Township, Norfolk County, Ontario.

Even though he was raised in a Loyalist and Quaker home, Moore was elected Captain of the rebels at Malahide, Ontario, during the Rebellions of 1837. Moore and his brothers comprised one of the most active Loyalist families to join the rebels. Court records show that Enoch was arrested and jailed in London on Dec. 21, 1837, convicted of high treason, sentenced to death, then reprieved on May 19, 1838. Hundreds of his neighbours signed the petition for clemency in the case of Enoch, his brother John, and neighbour Harvey Bryant. His sentence was first commuted to transportation to a penal colony on Van Diemen's Land for life, and then relaxed to 14 years of penal servitude but he was eventually pardoned and released on a peace bond on Oct. 5, 1838. His brother, Elias Moore, was released after a short stay in jail because the key witness absconded. Elias then returned to his seat in the 13th Parliament of Upper Canada.

Around this same time, Moore's younger brother, Lindley Murray Moore was founding an Anti-Slavery Society in Rochester, New York.

Moore and his wife and nine of their 11 children immigrated to the United States in July 1840, settling in Ogle County, Illinois. Moore died the next year in Rockford.

His brother, John Moore, built a fine home in Sparta, Ontario, that is still standing, now known as the John Moore House.
