= Norwich, Ontario =

Township in Ontario, Canada

Norwich
- Township (lower-tier)
- Township of Norwich
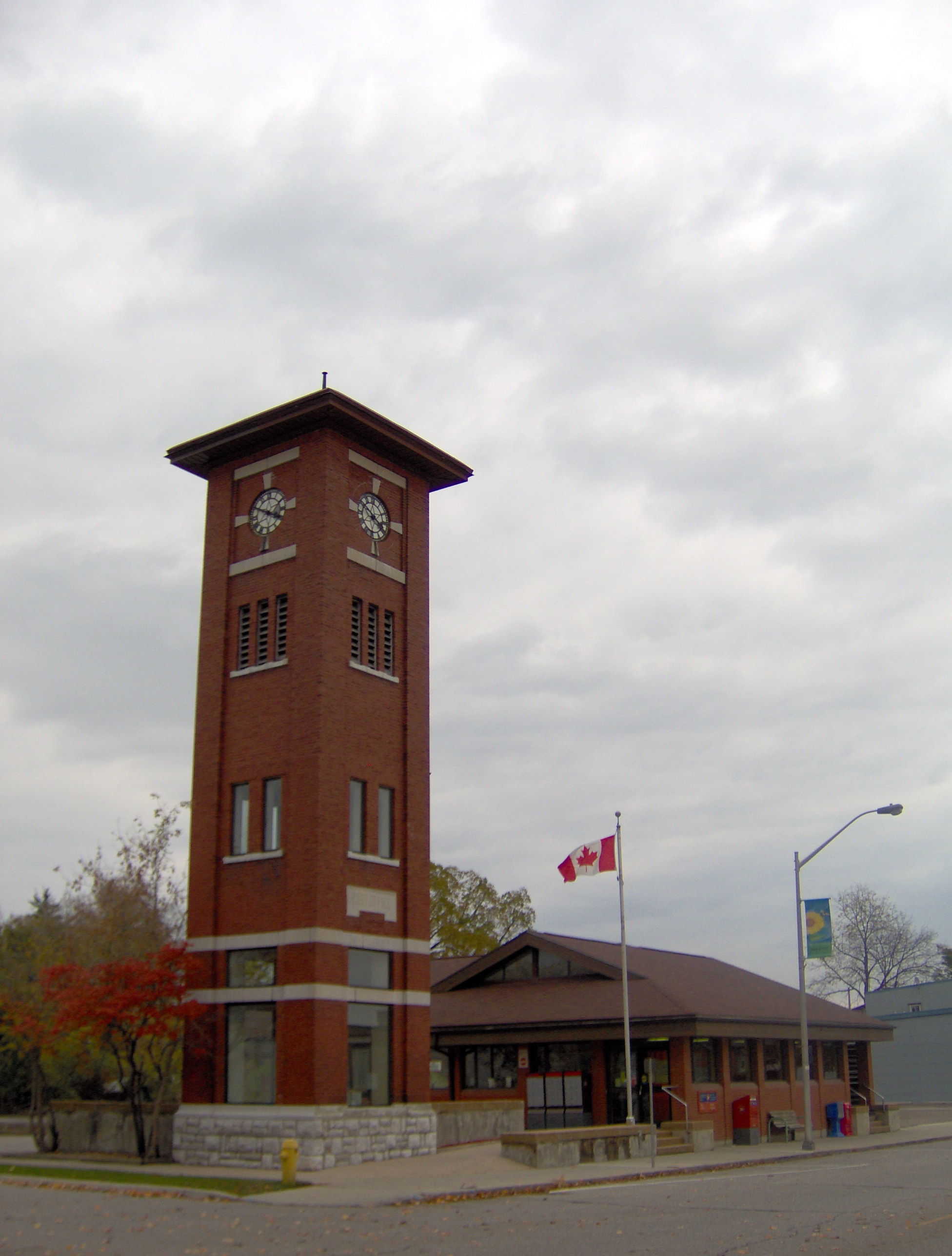
- Motto: Beautiful, Agricultural, Historical
- Location within Southern Ontario
- Coordinates: 42°59′N 80°36′W
- Country: Canada
- Province: Ontario
- County: Oxford

Government
  - Mayor: Jim Palmer
  - Councillors: List: Ward 1: Karl Toews; Ward 2: Lynne DePlancke; Ward 3: Shawn Gear; Ward 4: Adrian Couwenberg
  - MPs: Arpan Khanna
  - MPPs: Ernie Hardeman

Area
  - Land: 431.27 km^{2} (166.51 sq mi)

Population (2016)
  - Total: 11,001
  - Density: 25.5/km^{2} (66/sq mi)
- Time zone: UTC−05:00 (EST)
  - Summer (DST): UTC−04:00 (EDT)
- Postal Code: N0J 1P0, N0J 1P1, N0J 1P2
- Area codes: 519, 226, 548
- Website: www.norwich.ca

Norwich is a municipality located in Oxford County in Southwestern Ontario, Canada. At the centre of the Township of Norwich is the community of Norwich. The preferred pronunciation of the town name is /ˈnɔːrwɪtʃ/ NOR-witch, which differs from the pronunciation /ˈnɒrɪdʒ/ NORR-ij used for the city of Norwich, England. The origin of Norwich, Ontario, is more likely Norwich in upper New York State, the area from which the pioneering families emigrated in the early 19th century, where the community was known as Norwichville.

Oxford County Road 59 (formerly Highway 59) is the major north–south highway through much of the township, including the Town of Norwich.

The local economy is largely agricultural, based on corn, soybean, and wheat production with dairy farming in the north part of the township and tobacco, vegetable, and ginseng farming to the south. Slowly, ginseng and traditional cash crops are replacing the former cash crop - tobacco, as demand shrinks.

== Communities ==
Formerly East Oxford, North and South Norwich Townships, modern Norwich includes the communities of Beaconsfield, Bond's Corners, Brown's Corners, Burgessville, Cornell, Creditville, Curries, Eastwood, Hawtrey, Hink's Corners, Holbrook, Milldale, Muir, Newark, New Durham, Norwich, Oriel, Otterville, Oxford Centre, Rock's Mills, Rosanna, Springford, Summerville, Blows, and Vandecar.

== History ==
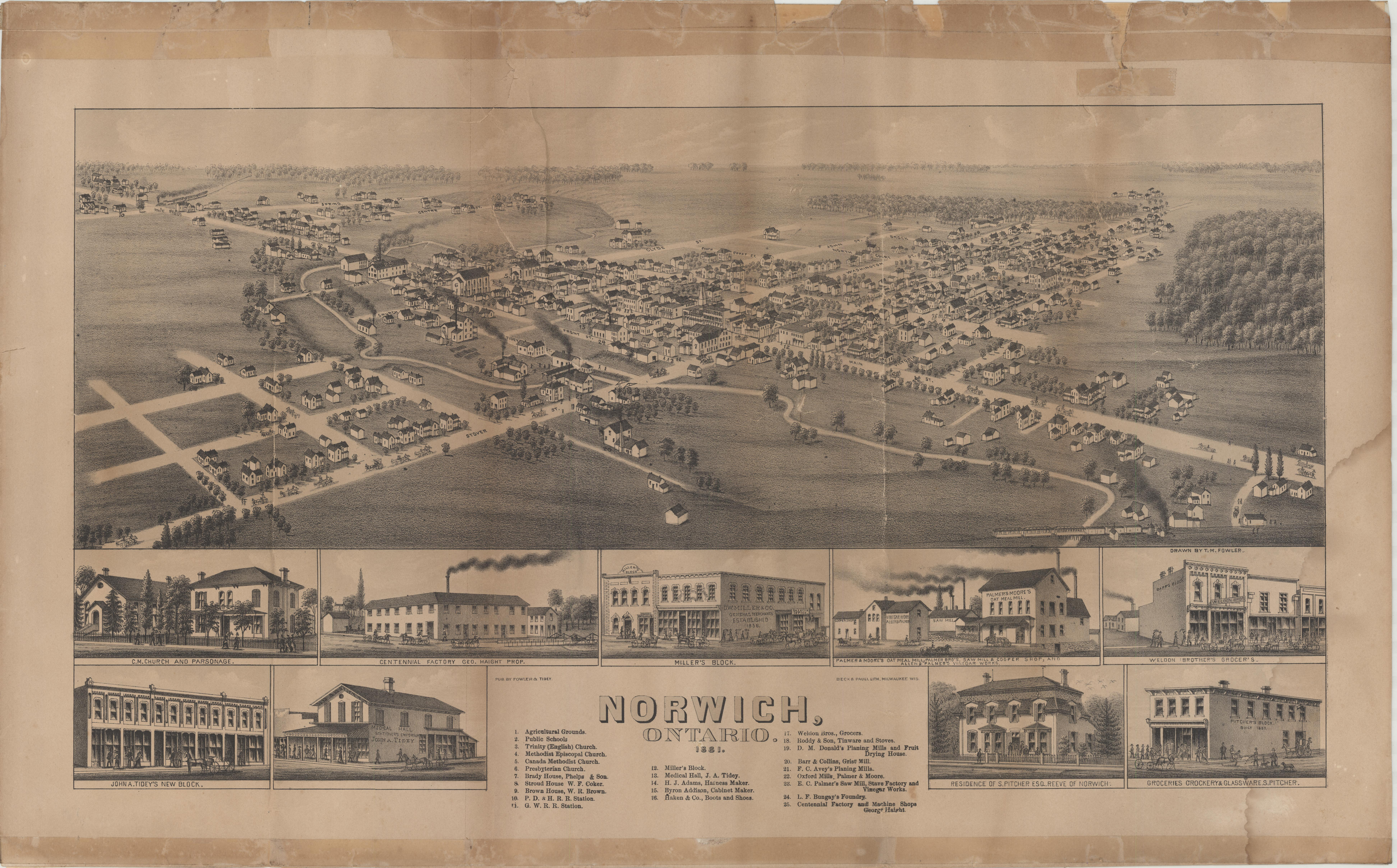
A pictorial bird's-eye view of the Town of Norwich in 1881, with drawings of notable buildings.

Upon his arrival in the province in 1792, the first proclamation issued by John Graves Simcoe, the Lieutenant Governor of Upper Canada while still at Kingston, announced the names and boundaries he had decided upon as political boundaries for Upper Canada. For areas lying to the west of Kingston, he decided that county names would be a "mirror of Britain". To accomplish this, the sequence of names for counties along Lake Ontario became Northumberland, Durham, York and Lincoln, and for counties along Lake Erie, the names became Norfolk, Suffolk, Essex and Kent. (This was the same sequence of county names in place along the eastern seacoast of England, running from the Scottish boundary down to the English Channel.) The proclamation defined the northern boundary of Norfolk County as being the Thames River. Norwich and Dereham townships were originally within the land area designated as belonging to Norfolk County in Upper Canada, and were named after the towns of Norwich and Dereham in Norfolk County in England.

Gov. Simcoe with several other government officers, guided by a party of Six Nations warriors, conducted a wilderness tour on foot down and back up the length of the Thames River in 1793 and decided to assign additional place names to mirror those they knew along the Thames River in England. Middlesex County was the name assigned to the area around a town site reserved at the "lower forks" in the river, to be called London; Dorchester was the name for a town site at the "middle forks", and the area around the "upper forks" was to be Oxford - the same sequence of names as found along the Thames in England. When legislation was passed in Upper Canada in 1798 to implement these new divisions, Norwich and Dereham were separated from Norfolk County and added to the new Oxford County, which included also Burford, Blenheim, Blandford and Oxford townships - names drawn from Oxfordshire in England.

Shortly after returning from this tour, Simcoe received in March 1793 a petition from Thomas Ingersoll and associates asking for grant of a township to which they promised to bring settlers from New England. Simcoe was impressed that the list of associates in the group was headed by the name of Gideon Bostwick, a well-known Church of England (Anglican) missionary in Massachusetts, and the group was granted the township of Oxford-on-the-Thames. The only way to bring settlers into such a wilderness area township was to first build a road from Brantford up to the Thames River, a distance of 30 mi (48 km), and Thomas Ingersoll arranged that work over the course of the next two years, involving numerous journeys back and forth by those involved. In all of this, the first ones to become permanently settled in the township were likely Samuel Canfield Sr. and his wife and sons, who agreed to make their new home into a half-way stopping point for travellers along the road, at what became known as Oxford Centre. This is commemorated with plaques at the cemetery there and in front of the elementary school a short distance to the east along what is now known as "The Old Stage Road".

The Bostwicks, Ingersolls and Canfields were all New England families who had made their start in the New World in the 1600s, and frontier living had been second nature to them for generations. The Bostwicks and Canfields were kinfolk by marriage and as community leaders in several places. Samuel Canfield Sr. was particularly valuable to the Oxford settlement because he had already lived the life of starting a new settlement in the mountains of New Hampshire. In the early 1770s he and wife Lucy joined a group of Connecticut families who had been granted the wilderness township of Marlow there, and Samuel soon became a town leader, elected one of the selectmen for the community and appointed captain of the local militia company. When the War of Independence came, he rallied the company to support the Continental Army. For this he is still revered as a local hero in Marlow.

For he and his family, however, the Marlow years also brought sorrow, because three daughters died and are buried there, two of them lost together in a house fire in 1789. Samuel complained of hearing voices which eventually drove him to quit Marlow, and the family was living in southern Vermont by the time Gideon Bostwick was traveling his Anglican mission circuit which reached there, spreading word of the township grant which had been received in far-away Oxford.

Samuel and family agreed to join the new venture, but he brought with him his own faith as a Baptist. He had been a Baptist preacher in Marlow, a community which had been drawn to a missionary named Caleb Blood in the early 1770s, and Caleb Blood became the first Baptist missionary in western Upper Canada thirty years later.

Settlement in the former Norwich Township came more than fifteen years after Oxford Township. The Norwich settlement was founded by two men: Peter Lossing and Peter De Long. Both were from New York. Peter Lossing's house was the first one in Norwich. It now stands by the old Quaker Meeting House. Both men where Quakers. The town of Norwich commenced as a completely Quaker settlement.

In 1799, the Township of Norwich was laid out by surveyor William Hambly into lines and concessions and 200-acre (0.81 km^{2}) lots. The post office dates from 1829 onward. The township was divided into North and South Norwich Townships in 1855.

=== The Norwich Quaker Settlement ===
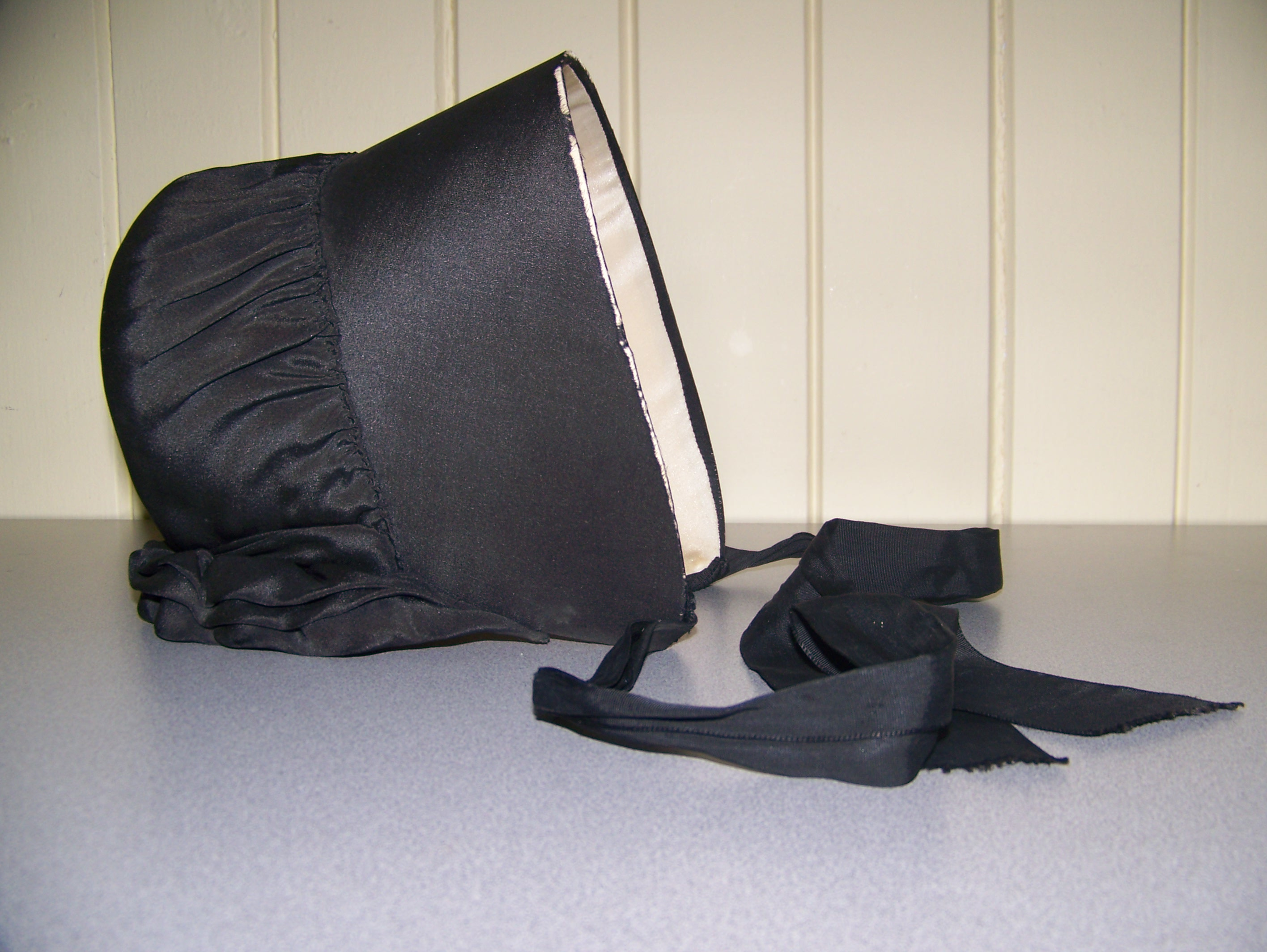
Quaker Cap

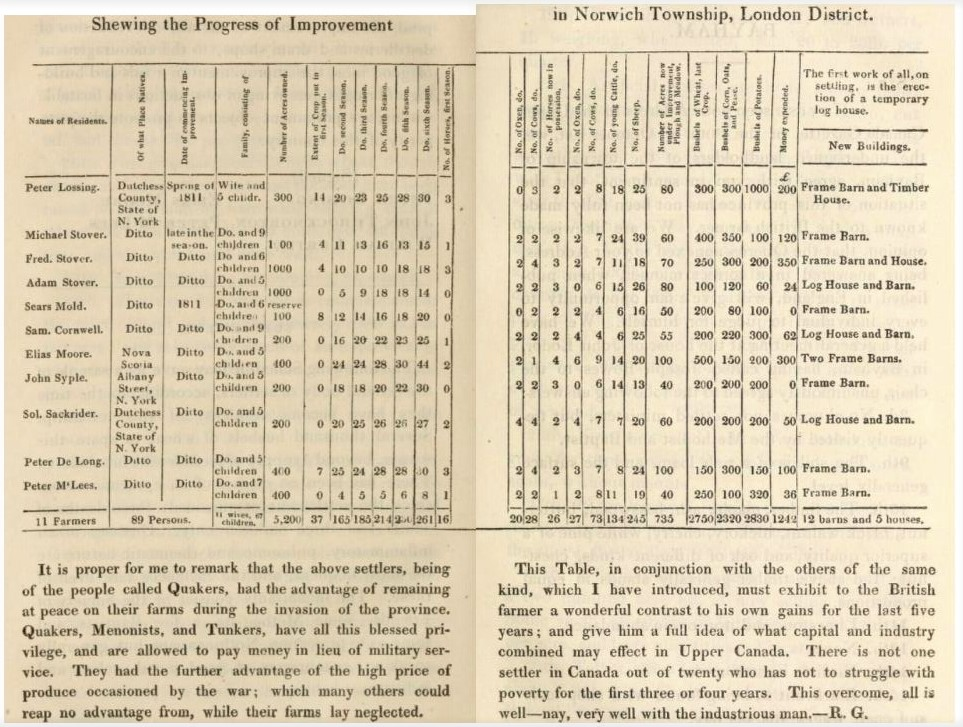
Description of Quaker settlement in Norwich township, from Gourlay's Statistical Account of Upper Canada, published in 1822

In 1809 Peter Lossing, a member of the Society of Friends from Dutchess County, New York, visited Norwich Township, and in June, 1810, with his brother-in-law, Peter De Long, purchased 15,000 acres (61 km^{2}) of land in this area. That autumn Lossing brought his family to Upper Canada and early in 1811 settled in Norwich Township. The De Long family and nine others, principally from Dutchess County, joined Lossing the same year and by 1820 an additional group of about fifty had settled within the tract. Many were Quakers and a frame meeting house, planned in 1812, was erected in 1817. These resourceful pioneers founded one of the most successful Quaker communities in Upper Canada.

=== The Otterville grist mill and Otter Creek sawmills ===
The first mill on the site was built, in 1807, by partners John Earle and Paul Averill Jr. The Averill family was from the Great Barrington area in Massachusetts, where Thomas Ingersoll had lived before coming to Oxford. Paul Averill Sr. had developed mills in Townsend township in the 1790s. John Earle married Paul's daughter Mary and with Paul Averill Jr. managed the Townsend mills. In 1806, Earle purchased the land surrounding the mill site at Otterville and with his brother-in-law Paul (sometimes referred to as Paul Avery) built the first grist mill on the site. The mill standing today, built in 1845 by Edward Bullock and Herbert Hilliard Cameron Tufford, is run by water power supplied by a dam on the river. The South Norwich Historical Society, on a lease basis, maintains this historic site and offers tours on request. Located in the centre of the village, the mill and its surrounding meadow is the site of an annual barbecue.

The pioneers of Oxford Township were slow to develop mills because of lack of any easy mode of transportation to send products to market, but Norwich township had the natural benefit of Otter Creek running through the township on a course which flowed south to Lake Erie and what became the harbour at Port Burwell. By the 1820s there were several sawmills along the creek in Norwich Township, supplying not only local needs but also rafting sawn timber and lumber down the creek to Port Burwell, for export to New York state.

=== Dairy farming and cheese factories ===
Oxford Township's pioneer farms were already famous for butter and cheese-making before the War of 1812, and Norwich Township's Quaker pioneers were quick to follow. In response to a questionnaire from author and agitator Robert Gourlay in 1817, Norwich farmers submitted a detailed chart showing the progress in the Quaker settlement in its first five years, which Gourlay published in his book about conditions in Upper Canada (see chart on this page). It shows that the 11 pioneer Quaker families brought with them more cows (28) than horses or oxen, and after five years had nearly tripled the number of cows being kept.

By the 1840s, dairy farmers in Oxford, Norwich and Dereham townships were competing each year for top honours at agricultural fairs around the province for butter and cheese-making prizes. In the 1860s, Norwich farmers were the first in Canada to adopt the American factory system for cheese-making, with two different approaches competing for acceptance. Andes Smith took the approach of contracting with other farmers to buy their milk and haul it to a factory on his farm using a tanker wagon. Whatever profit or loss came from manufacturing cheese was his own. Harvey Farrington was a cheese factory specialist who had come to Norwich from New York state, and at his factory outside Norwichville he contracted with farmers to haul their milk to him and receive payment based on what came from cheese sales after Farrington deducted two cents per pound for his services in running the factory and making the cheese. Smith was first and was the more innovative one, gaining international recognition in 1865 for manufacturing a 4,000 lb (1,800 kg) cheese, but he went bankrupt the following year. Farrington's co-op system became the good news story that ended up being immortalized in published histories and on historical plaques.

=== S. Allen Apple Work ===
S. Allen Apple Work, today known as Allen’s Apple Juice, was established in Norwich in the 1880s by Solomon Allen.

The company first produced cider vinegar before expanding into apple cider in 1891–1892. As apple cider grew in popularity, Solomon purchased the largest steam-powered cider mill press available. At its peak, the mill produced 115 barrels per day. Today, the Norwich Public Library sits on the site of the old mill.

Mr. Allen was an innovative businessman who developed a way to use pomace from the apple press as an energy source to help power the steam press. In addition to apple juice, Allen also produced “applejack,” an alcoholic beverage.

Allen and his company were well-loved in Norwich and continued to prosper until 1939, when the Canada Vinegar Company purchased the business from the family. Canada Vinegar later moved production to Toronto.

=== Amalgamation ===
In 1975, Oxford County underwent countywide municipal restructuring. The Village of Norwich and the Townships of East Oxford, North Norwich and South Norwich were amalgamated to create the Township of Norwich.

=== The Tornado of 1979 ===
On August 7, 1979, at around 7:00 pm, Norwich was struck by the Woodstock Tornado, one of the largest tornadoes ever to occur in Southern Ontario. The storm cut a path of destruction across Norwich Township from Blows to New Durham, leaving the community of Oxford Centre in a state of total destruction. Several homes, the General Store, Anglican church and the Community Hall were levelled. The United Church at the top of the hill had its roof taken completely off and extensive interior damage, but all seven stained glass windows were left intact. One of the homes damaged was that of the last Ingersoll family member resident in the county, and narrowly missed destroying a cherished family keepsake album, which afterwards underwent conservation work at the Oxford County Archives and is now proudly displayed at the museum in Ingersoll. Two people lost their lives that day and one senior succumbed a few months later, never returning from hospital. All that remained of Oxford Centre's Anglican church was the foundation and one door hanging from its frame. Neighbours, even people from miles away were kind enough to return little bits of the original church, which was built in 1867. A silver paten and silver flagon, the communion rail, a credenza and parts of two of the stained glass windows along with a few other artifacts were recovered and are now displayed in the Narthex. The Church was soon rebuilt to the original plans. The F4 tornado, which had its beginning north west of Woodstock cut a swath all the way to Waterford of approximately 60 km and at its widest point near Oxford Centre was about 400m wide.

=== The Norwich Tornado of 1998 ===
On the afternoon of June 2, 1998, a severe weather outbreak affected Southern Ontario. At around 3:50 pm, there was a report of a tornado touching down in Holbrook and heading straight for Norwich. The tornado hit Norwich around 4:05 pm, damaging trees, farm equipment, barns, houses, and the wooden Holy Trinity Anglican Church (1867). Three people were injured, and the next day, Environment Canada confirmed that an F2 or F3 tornado had hit the village. Following a decision by the parish, Holy Trinity Anglican Church was not rebuilt as the congregation opted to join with St. John's Anglican Church, Otterville. However, a stone monument commemorating the church continues to mark the site.

== Demographics ==
In the 2021 Census of Population conducted by Statistics Canada, Norwich had a population of 11,151 living in 3,761 of its 3,892 total private dwellings, a change of 2.9% from its 2016 population of 10,835. With a land area of 424.01 km^{2} (163.71 sq mi), it had a population density of 26.3/km^{2} (68.1/sq mi) in 2021.

Canada census – Norwich community profile

	2021	2016	2011
Population	11,151 (+2.9% from 2016)	11,001 (2.6% from 2011)	10,721 (2.3% from 2006)
Land area	424.01 km^{2} (163.71 sq mi)	431.27 km^{2} (166.51 sq mi)	431.28 km^{2} (166.52 sq mi)
Population density	26.3/km^{2} (68/sq mi)	25.5/km^{2} (66/sq mi)	24.9/km^{2} (64/sq mi)
Median age	36 (M: 36, F: 36)	35.7 (M: 34.9, F: 36.4)	38.8 (M: 35.1, F: 36.5)
Private dwellings	3,760 (total)	3,715 (total)	3719 (total)
Median household income

References: 2021 2016 2011

Population trend:

- Population in 2016: 11,001
- Population in 2011: 10,721
- Population in 2006: 10,481
- Population in 2001: 10,478
- Population in 1996: 10,611 (or 10,560 when adjusted to 2001 boundaries)
- Population in 1991: 10,146

== Local government ==
The township government, Norwich Township Council, consists of four councillors based on wards and a mayor. Norwich has four wards: Ward 1 is South Norwich including Otterville. Ward 2 consists of the Village of Norwich. Ward 3 is North Norwich which is the middle portion of township including Burgessville but excluding Norwich village. Ward 4 is East Oxford, it consists of the northern portion of township, including Oxford Centre. As of 2024, the elected council consists of:

Mayor: Jim Palmer

Councillors:

- Ward 1: Karl Toews
- Ward 2: Lynne DePlancke
- Ward 3: Shawn Gear
- Ward 4: Adrian Couwenberg

The Township offices, opened in January 2015, are located on Airport Road in the community of Norwich.

For provincial and federal elections, Norwich is included in the riding of 'Oxford'. Currently, the Federal MP of Oxford is Arpan Khanna and the Provincial MPP is Ernie Hardeman.

Norwich federal election results
Year	Liberal		Conservative		New Democratic		Green	
2021	13%	738	56%	3,286	11%	662	2%	114
2019	12%	663	60%	3,337	14%	779	5%	301

Norwich provincial election results
Year	PC		New Democratic		Liberal		Green	
2022	50%	2,283	14%	626	8%	352	4%	159
2018	69%	3,280	21%	1,009	4%	168	3%	156

== Attractions ==
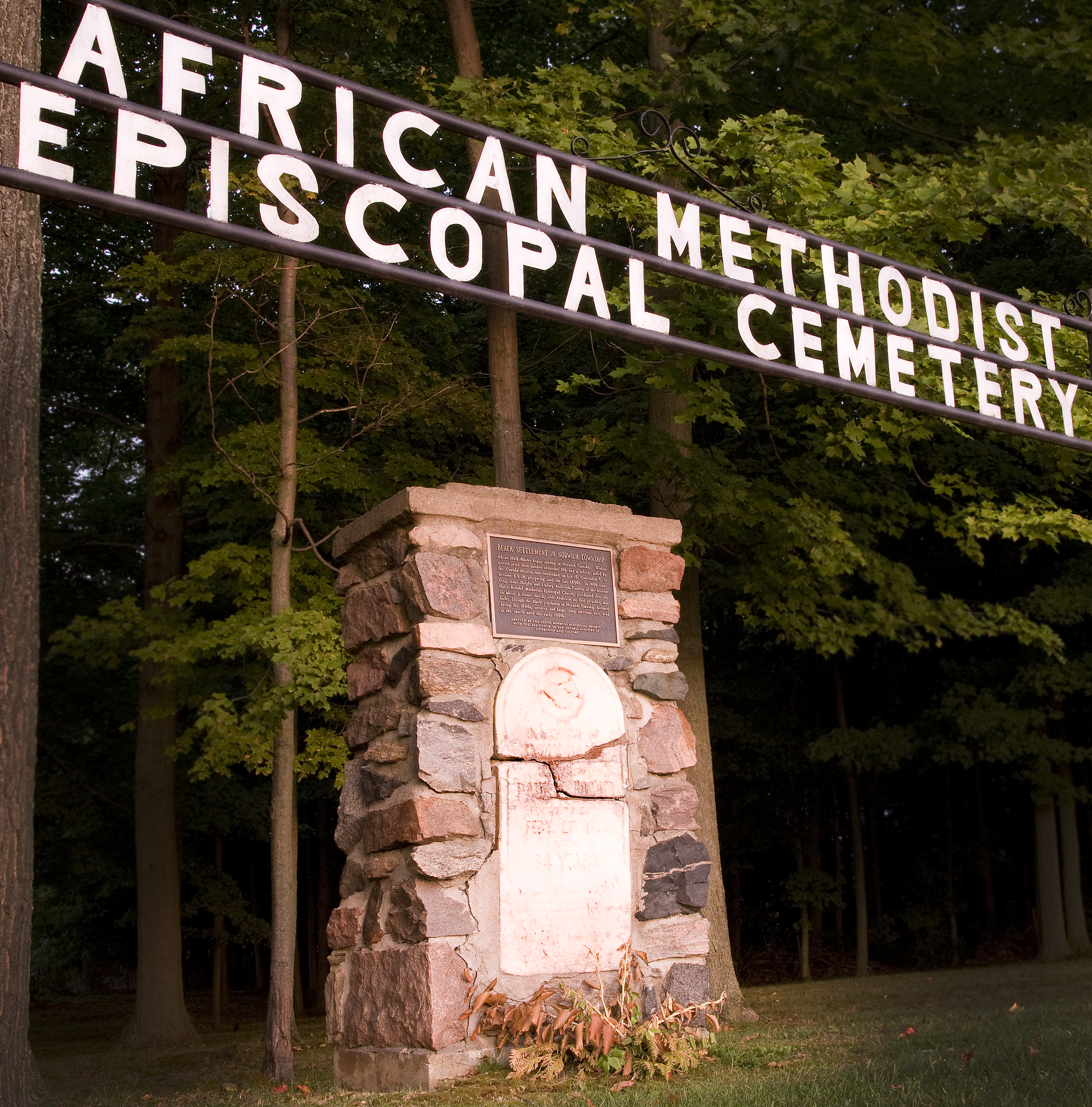
Underground Railway Cemetery

- The Norwich and District Museum: The Norwich and District Museum is one of Ontario's longest operating rural community museums and contains a collection of artifacts relating to the agricultural and social history of the area. The museum is actually housed inside a former meeting house (built in 1889) which was donated by The Society of Friends to the Pioneer Society for this purpose.
- Emily Stowe Public School : Opened in late 2012, the school now consists of kindergarten to grade 8.
- Norwich District High School : Norwich District High School, home to the Norwich Knights, was opened in 1952 in the south end of the village of Norwich. On October 28, 2008, Thames Valley District School Board trustees made the decision to close Norwich District High School due to declining enrollment in the area and the school board at large. A reunion for past NDHS alumni was held on June 5–6, 2010. The school is now called Emily Stowe Public School.
- Grand Trunk Railway Station Museum and Blacksmith Shop: The South Norwich Historical Society has restored this 1875 station to its condition as an 1881 Grand Trunk Railway station. The waiting room and office are restored authentically, the baggage room is an interpretation room for displays of the area's history. Permanent displays feature railway construction of the 1880s with many artifacts of all periods. The Underground Railroad and early Black settlement of the area is another highlight, as well as the story of early Quaker heritage in the area.
- Early black settlement cemetery: In 1982 during the 175th celebrations of the community, a plaque was placed at the cemetery to commemorate the black settlement of freed families who made their homes in this area.
- Otterville Park: Just north of the main corner, and through the stone gates, is 10 acres (40,000 m^{2}) of parklands graced with tall pines, with a swimming pool, ball diamond, horseshoe pitch, tennis and basketball courts, and children's playground.

=== Historical schools ===
- East Oxford P.S.: 505767 Old Stage Road. A plaque commemorates Old Stage Road. Governor Simcoe inherited this Indian trail known as the Detroit Path. Both American and British troops used it during the War of 1812 travelling between Detroit and Ancaster. Sections of the trail can still be travelled in East and West Oxford.
- Norwich District High School : Stover St. S (Oxford Road 59), Norwich. Built in 1952. Norwich Cenotaph: "Weeping Lady." This monument typifies the Quaker response of pacifism and the futility of war. The High school has now been converted to a public school (Emily Stowe Public School).
- Norwich P.S. : 12 Washington St, Norwich. Originally built in 1896 but replaced in 1973. The school is now closed and removed making the way for new townhomes.
- Otterville P.S. : 318 Main St W, Otterville. The facade is all that remains of the original 1927 building. However, there is a plaque with the old school bell at the front of the school.

=== Plaques and monuments ===
- Bell with historic plaque: At the Otterville firehall.
- Emily Howard Jennings Stowe, M.D.: On the ground of the Norwich and District Historical Museum and Archives
- Establishment of Free Rural Mail Delivery: At the Springfield Community Centre.
- Harold Adams Innis, economic historian: At his birthplace, Innisfree Farm, on County Road 19, 3 km east of Otterville
- The Norwich Quaker Settlement: At the Quaker Pioneer Cemetery, Quaker Street and Concession Road 3
- Otterville African Methodist Episcopal Church and Cemetery: At the entrance to the cemetery, on the west side of Church Street, in Otterville

== Cultural resources ==
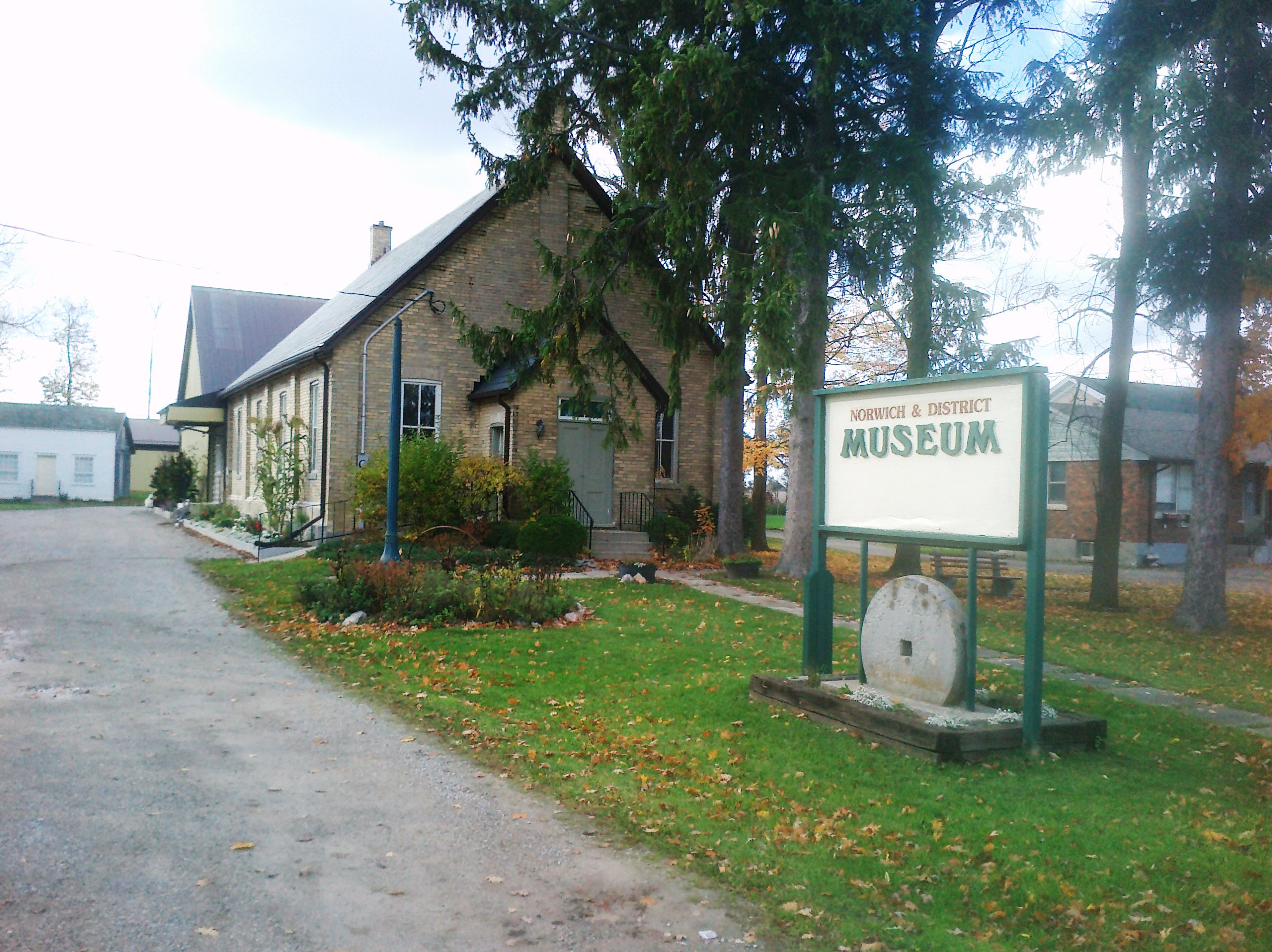
The Norwich and District Museum

- Norwich and District Historical Society Museum & Archives: 89 Stover St N, RR#3, Norwich, ON N0J 1P0
- Burgessville Public Library: 604 Main St S, Burgessville, ON N0J 1C0
- Norwich Public Library: 10 Tidey St, Norwich, ON N0J 1P0
- Otterville Public Library: 218 Main St W, Norwich, ON N0J 1R0
- Ross Butler Studio and Agricultural Gallery
- South Norwich Historical Society Museum (GTR)
- Thames Valley Museum School
- Woodlawn Community Centre

== Notable residents ==
- Ross Butler (1907-1995) Farmer, photographer, songwriter, livestock judge, cattle and poultry breeder, pioneer of cattle artificial insemination, painter and sculptor of farm animals, as well as an author (the autobiographical, My Father's Farm). Commissioned in 1939 to paint over 500 "Standard Type" paintings of Canadian livestock to be placed in schools across Canada. See link for other notable accomplishments.
- Cassie L. Chadwick (1857-1907), born Elizabeth Bigley in the Norwich Township community of Eastwood, moved to Cleveland, Ohio, became Madam and infamous fraudster
- Ronald C. Davidson (1941-2016), physicist and first director of the MIT Plasma Science and Fusion Center
- Harold Innis, (1894-1952), political economist, born and raised in the Norwich Township community of Bookton
- William Melville Martin (1876-1970) Second Premier of Saskatchewan
- James Beech Moore (1842-1931), longest serving minister in the Canadian Baptist movement, at the time of his death the oldest Canadian veteran of the American Civil War
- Eddie Oatman (1889-1973) Ten-time PCHA All-Star, and member of the Quebec Bulldogs of the NHA. Won the Stanley Cup with the Bulldogs in 1912, and played professional hockey for 32 full seasons.
- Emily Stowe, (1831-1903), first woman doctor to practice medicine in Canada, and Augusta Stowe-Gullen, her daughter, first woman to earn a medical degree in Canada

== Media ==
Norwich's local newspaper, the Norwich Gazette, was shuttered by publisher PostMedia in July 2018.

== See also ==
- List of townships in Ontario
