= Lindley Murray Moore =

American abolitionist

Lindley Moore
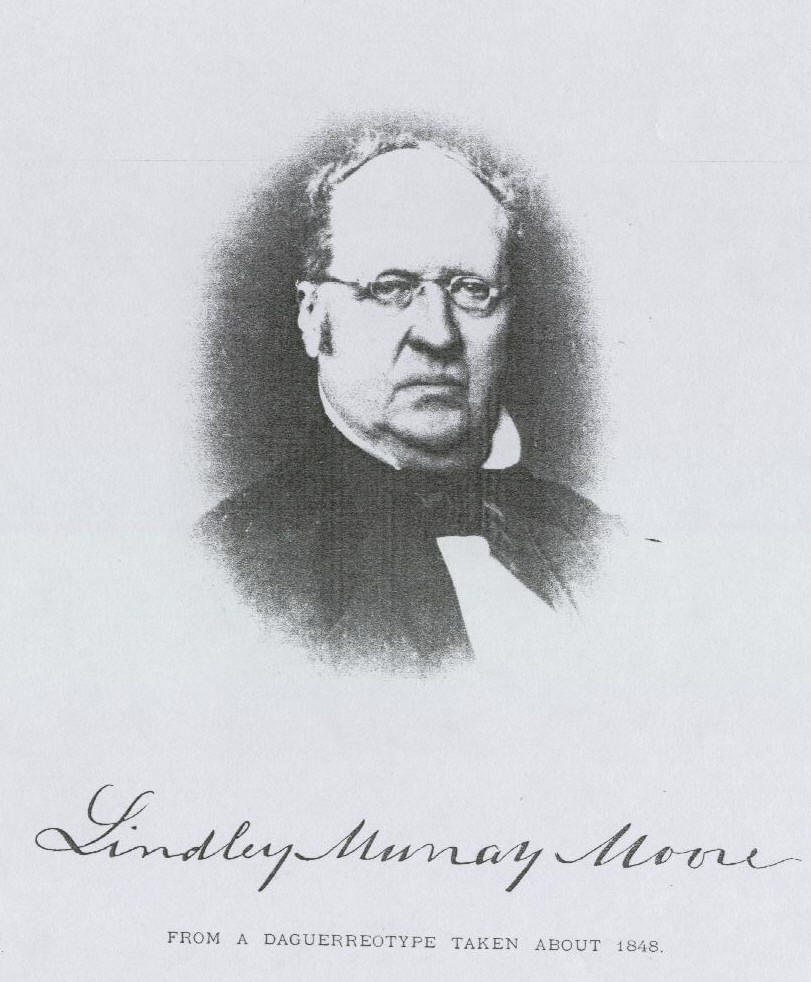
- Born: Lindley Murray Moore; May 31, 1788; Annapolis Valley, Nova Scotia, Canada
- Died: August 14, 1871 (aged 83); Rochester, New York, US
- Occupations: Educator and farmer
- Known for: Abolitionist
- Spouse: Abigail Mott
- Children: Edward Mott Moore (son); Ann M. Haines (daughter)
- Relatives: Samuel Moore (father); Elias Moore (brother); Enoch Moore (brother); John Moore (brother); James Mott (brother-in-law); Lucretia Mott (sister-in-law)

Lindley Moore (May 31, 1788 – August 14, 1871), was a Canadian-American abolitionist, educator, and farmer. With Frederick Douglass, he coordinated travel plans on the Underground Railroad and they gave speeches at anti-slavery assemblies. Moore worked with Hiram Wilson to identify and make education available for formerly enslaved people who had made it across the United States-Canadian border.

Moore operated private schools in the New York City area and was a superintendent and a teacher at Haverford College. In Rochester, New York, he operated a 170-acre farm in the 1830s and then returned to teaching. His wife, Abigail Mott Moore was the niece of Lucretia Mott.

== Early life ==
Lindley Murray Moore was born May 31, 1788, in Annapolis Valley, Nova Scotia, Canada into a Quaker family. (Note: His birthday is stated as May 30, 1788 in his obituary.) His parents were Rachel Stone and Samuel Moore. His father, born in New Jersey, named him after his friend Lindley Murray.

Before Lindley's birth, Samuel Moore, his wife, and their children had lived in the United States. During the American Revolutionary War, the family became concerned about being attacked by American soldiers and left their New Jersey home for New York City. Lindley's father was considered a loyalist and his property was confiscated by the patriots. (Note: The book A History of Haverford College for the First Sixty Years of its Existence states that his father's name is Thomas. The article for Samuel Moore states that Lindley is his son, which is backed up by an article titled Samuel Moore's Notable Sons) Samuel's wife and children were taken from their residence and sent to the British line at Amboy (in New Jersey) under a flag of truce. From there, they moved to Nova Scotia. After living in Canada, the family visited New Jersey. Lindley Murray Moore stayed in the United States while his father and siblings moved to Upper Canada (Ontario). (Note: Moore's brothers, Elias, Enoch, and John were politicians.)

At about the age of 17, Lindley attended a school in Sandwich, Massachusetts. He then worked as a teacher so that he could save money to pay for further education.

== Marriage and family ==
Lindley married Abigail Lydia Mott on August 19, 1813. (Note: Abigail's brother James Mott was married to Lucretia Coffin Mott, the Quaker reformer. Richard Mott, another brother, was a Congressman.) Their son Edward Mott Moore, who became a physician, was born on July 15, 1814, in Rahway, New Jersey. He died on March 3, 1902, in Rochester, New York. Gilbert Hicks Moore was born in 1816 and died in 1868. Their daughter Ann Mott Moore was born in 1818.

After living and working in the New York City area, the Moores moved to Rochester, New York in 1830. The following year, they bought a farm and built a two-story Greek Revival style house on it. Moore and his wife were members of the Orthodox Farmington Quarterly Meeting by November 1836. (Note: The meeting published a pamphlet titled, An Address from Farmington Quarterly Meeting of Friends, to its Members on Slavery.) In addition to his anti-slavery efforts, Moore was vice-president of the Rochester Temperance Society.

== Career ==
Moore pursued a career as an educator and is also said to have been a preacher. After completing his education, he taught at Nine Partners Boarding School in New York. He and his wife, Abigail Lydia Mott, operated a Quaker school in Rahway, New Jersey for several years. In 1815, they operated a school on Pearl Street in New York City that was administered by the Friends Monthly Meeting. In the spring of 1821, they had opened a boarding school for boys in Flushing, (Note: They are also said to have opened the school in Flushing by 1820.) and in 1827 the school was moved to Westchester Village, New York. Moore purchased a 170-acre farm in what is now Rochester, New York. In 1836, he sold his farm and then lost all of his property. He returned to teaching at the Rochester high school. From 1848 to 1850, Moore was a teacher and superintendent of Haverford College.

== Abolitionism ==
In 1838, Moore founded the Rochester Anti-Slavery Society with Asa Anthony. Moore was the organization's first president. Moore delivered a speech entitled Autographs for Freedom at the Independence Day celebration of 1852 in Rochester, New York. Like other instances, Moore shared the stage with Frederick Douglass, whose topic was What to the slave is the Fourth of July? Moore wrote the essay "Religious, Moral and Political Duties" in the 1853 collection titled Autographs for Freedom.

== Underground Railroad ==
Moore helped Madison Washington by concealing him during his flight for freedom, as did Hiram Wilson. Moore raised funds so that Washington could retrieve his wife, but he was captured in the process and was believed to be sold to a slaveholder in the Deep South. Moore learned about Washington through Frederick Douglass. Moore identified formerly enslaved people (in Upper Canada) who were interested in obtaining education and Rev. Hiram Wilson provided the funding.

== Later years and death ==
Abigail died on September 4, 1846, of tuberculosis at her home in Rochester, New York. About 1850, Moore retired. He lived with his son, Edward Mott Moore in Rochester, until his death on August 14, 1871. At the time of his death, he also had a daughter, Ann M. Haines of Buffalo, New York.

== Sources ==
- Haverford College Alumni Association (1892). A History of Haverford College for the First Sixty Years of Its Existence. Porter & Coates.
- Moore, Bob (2010). "Samuel Moore's Notable Sons" (PDF). Canadian Quaker Historic Journal. 75.
