= Samuel Charles Blackwell =

British-born American abolitionist (1823-1901)

Samuel Charles Blackwell (1823–1901) was a British-born American abolitionist.

== Biography ==
Blackwell was born in England, the son of Bristol sugar refiner Samuel Blackwell (c. 1790–August 7, 1838) and Hannah Lane, who moved their family of eight children to the United States in 1832. They first lived in New York City, and later in New Jersey. Samuel Blackwell senior, an anti-slavery campaigner and Congregationalist who wanted his daughters educated as well as his sons, passed his interest in social reform on to his children. In 1838, the year he died, the family was living in Cincinnati, Ohio.

Samuel Charles Blackwell's wife was Antoinette Brown, the first woman ordained in a recognized church in the United States, and prominent speaker in the Abolitionism and Women's Rights Movements. Blackwell was also an abolitionist and was, like his wife, a Unitarian. He married Brown at her home in Henrietta, New York in 1856. At that time, Blackwell was in the hardware business and also invested in real estate. The couple next lived in New York City and then for many years in New Jersey. Blackwell helped care for their children (seven, of whom two died young), each of them given the "double" name Brown Blackwell.

At the time of his death in 1901, Samuel Charles Blackwell was 78 years old and had worked as the Treasurer of the Mexican and South American Telegraph Company for 20 years, where he took great interest in reform movements.

His brother, Henry B. Blackwell, was the husband of Lucy Stone, a friend of Antoinette Brown at Oberlin College. (Stone was a noted abolitionist and worker for women's suffrage.) His sisters included Elizabeth Blackwell, the first women to receive an MD in United States and the first to practice medicine, and Emily Blackwell, the third female graduate of a U.S. medical school, as well as writer/biographer Sarah Ellen Blackwell, and Anna Blackwell, who translated George Sand and Alan Kardec.

== Sources ==
- Encyclopedia of New Jersey (eds. Marc Mappen, Maxine N. Lurie)
- Antoinette Brown Blackwell, uua.org.
- Oxford Dictionary of National Biography (article on Elizabeth Blackwell)
