= Anna Blackwell =

British writer and journalist (1816–1900)

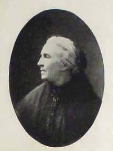
- Born: 21 June 1816; Bristol, England, UK
- Died: 4 January 1900 (aged 83); Hastings, England, UK
- Occupations: writer, journalist, translator
- Relatives: Henry Browne Blackwell (brother); Samuel Charles Blackwell (brother); Elizabeth Blackwell (sister); Emily Blackwell (sister); Antoinette Brown Blackwell (sister-in-law)
- Writing career
- Pen name: Fidelitas
- Genres: correspondent, poetry, fairy tales, essays
- Subject: occult

Anna Blackwell (pseudonym, Fidelitas; 21 June 1816 – 4 January 1900) was a British writer, journalist, and translator who focused on spiritual and social issues. She had a long and successful career as Parisian correspondent of leading colonial papers. She also wrote poetry, fairy tales, and essays on occult subjects. As a teacher and journalist, she exercised a wide influence in the U.S. and in France.

== Early life and education ==
Anna Blackwell was born at Bristol on 21 June 1816. Her parents were Samuel Blackwell and Hannah (Lane) Blackwell. Her brother, Henry, was an American advocate for social and economic reform who co-founded the Republican Party and the American Woman Suffrage Association. Her brother, Samuel, was an abolitionist. There were two other brothers, John and George. Of the sisters, Elizabeth was the first woman to receive a medical degree in the United States, while Emily was the second. Sarah was an artist. Their sister-in-law, Antoinette Brown Blackwell, was the first woman to be ordained as a mainstream Protestant minister in the United States.

Governesses provided her education.

== Career ==
In 1832, she removed to the United States with her family. Between 1838 and 1842, Blackwell and two of her sisters ran a school in Cincinnati.

She then removed to France, where (in Paris) she resided as a newspaper correspondent for forty-two years. She contributed to Once a Week, English Woman's Journal, The Ladies' Repository, and other publications. In later life, Blackwell she lived at Triel, France.

Blackwell was an Associationist being conversant with the social reorganization theories of Charles Fourier, and advocated cooperative methods as opposed to individual and competitive enterprise. She also became a member of the Brook Farm community, near Boston, Massachusetts.

It was in 1842 that I spent some weeks at Brook Farm, a period I look back to as the happiest of my life. We were about a hundred, and all had brought to the scheme the most desperate devotion. Some of our number were rich, some poor, the former keeping up the place, the latter earning their livelihood; none paid for board and lodging and all performed a certain amount of manual labor. We were, too, of all ages and conditions -- the young, the old, the married, the single. Hawthorne often visited the place, but never resided there. We had among us an amateur shoemaker, also a carpenter, baker, etc., every branch of labor being shared by both sexes. In was a principle of Fourier that in so far as it was practicable, men and women should work togethere. The daily programme was arrange according to Fourier's group system, each member choosing the group that best suited him. I worked in no less than eleven, but could not get into the favorite one, that of the washing-up. I must now tell you of my own groups. One of these was the lamp cleaning and dressing department. We had seventy-two lamps and each process had its group. Thus one set of workers collected the lamps, another cleaned them, a third-myself among the number- trimmed the wicks, a fourth filled the receptacles with oil, and so on. I also belonged to the 'baby' group', being fond of babies. One hour daily I attended to the infant Phalansterians. Then I belonged to the 'waiter group'. We had no paid servants, and, after being waited on at table ourselves, we waited on others. ... My own connection with it ended in this way. At the time of my stay I had under my care a young sister, and, as there was no room for her, I felt compelled to leave on my charge's account.

Blackwell was a spiritualist. In 1873, the Eclectic Magazine announced that Blackwell had printed for private circulation a pamphlet entitled "Spiritualism and Spiritism", which contained what the magazine described as "some rather strange revelations". The publication went on to say that Blackwell informed the editors that she had authentic evidence, revealed to her by two spirits, that so far back as the year 3543 B.C. she held the distinguished position of a Princess of Abyssinia. It was her father of that date who first communicated this to her, and the intelligence has since been confirmed by another spirit.

In 1875, the Spiritualist Association of Great Britain offered two prizes for essays upon 'the Probable Effect of Spiritualism upon the Social, Moral, and Religious Condition of Society', the first of which was won by Blackwell. She also translated Allan Kardec's works from the French, besides writing in the spiritual press numerous articles explaining and defending reincarnation, many years prior to the advent of Helena Blavatsky. Chapman and Hall published a volume of her poems which illustrate the spirit and aspirations of her life, especially those entitled "The Bishop's Banquet" and "A Vision--of human life as it is, and might, and should be". Blackwell also wrote and translated several works on social questions, her last book, entitled Whence and Whither having been published by G. Redway in 1898. Spence's Encyclopædia of Occultism (1920) mentions her briefly, only stating that Blackwell endeavoured without success to establish the doctrine of reincarnation in England.

== Death and legacy ==
Blackwell died on 4 January 1900 in Hastings. Some of her correspondence and that of other family members is held in Blackwell family papers collection at Duke University.

== Selected works ==
=== Books ===
- Philosophy of Existence, 1871
- The Perfect Way or the Finding of Christ, 1882
- Poems, 1883
- Whence and Whither? Or, Correlation between Philosophic Convictions and Social Forms., 1898

=== Translations ===
- The Spirits' Book, by Allan Kardec
- The Medium's Book, by Allan Kardec
- Heaven and Hell, by Allan Kardec
- Jacques, George Sand
- The Little Gypsy, Elie Sauvage

=== Essays ===
- "The Probable Effect of Spiritism Upon the Social, Moral, and Religious Condition of Society"
- "The Church of the Future"

=== Pamphlets ===
- "Spiritualism and Spiritism"
