= Henry Browne Blackwell =

American activist (1825–1909)

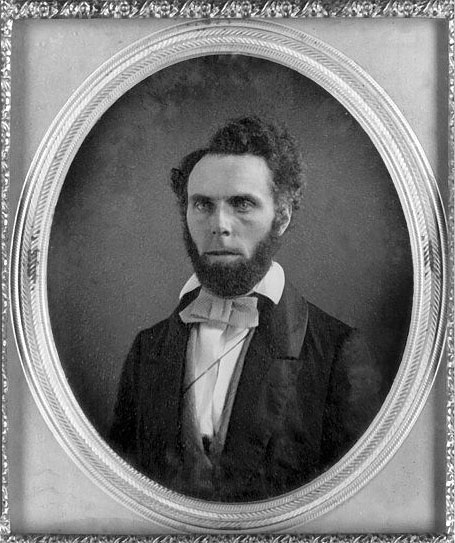
- Born: May 4, 1825; Bristol, England
- Died: September 7, 1909 (aged 84); Dorchester, Massachusetts, United States
- Occupation: Activist
- Spouse: Lucy Stone (m. 1855; died 1893)
- Children: Alice Stone Blackwell

Henry Browne Blackwell (May 4, 1825 – September 7, 1909), (Note: Sometimes written Brown) was an American advocate for social and economic reform. He was involved in the nascent Republican Party and the American Woman Suffrage Association. He published Woman's Journal, starting in 1870 in Boston, Massachusetts, with wife, Lucy Stone.

== Early life ==
Henry Blackwell was born May 4, 1825, in Bristol, Gloucestershire, England, the seventh of nine children of Samuel Blackwell and Hannah Lane Blackwell. Blackwell's father, a sugar refiner whose livelihood conflicted with his abolitionist principles, experimented with making beet sugar as an alternative to slave-grown cane sugar. In 1832, the family – including eight children and their father's sister Mary – emigrated to the United States. The family settled first in New York, where Blackwell's father established a sugar refinery and the ninth child was born, and then just outside New York in Jersey City. Blackwell's father took an interest in the nascent abolition movement. William Lloyd Garrison and other leaders of the movement were visitors in the family's home. Blackwell's eldest sister, Anna, participated in the emerging agitation for women's rights, attending the 1837 Anti-Slavery Convention of American Women and drafting its letter to John Quincy Adams thanking him for his support of women's right to petition.

After fire destroyed the refinery and the Panic of 1837 destroyed remaining resources, the family moved to Cincinnati in 1838, where Blackwell's father intended to establish another refinery. However, within months of their arrival, he died, leaving the family destitute. Blackwell's mother, aunt, and three elder sisters opened a school in their home, while thirteen-year-old Henry and his brother Sam took clerking jobs. In 1840 Blackwell was sent to the short-lived Kemper College in St. Louis with the intent that he should become a lawyer. But financial difficulties forced him to return home and resume clerking. Around 1845, he became a partner in a flour mill business, in which he managed operations of three mills. Within a year he had made enough profit to purchase a small brick house in Cincinnati's Walnut Hills section, which remained the Blackwell family home until they moved east in 1856.

Seeking a business in which he might achieve financial independence, Blackwell next tried sugar refining. When that failed, a visiting English cousin persuaded him to accept a loan with which he and brother Sam purchased half interest in a Cincinnati wholesale hardware business. In 1850, at the age of twenty-four, Blackwell became the traveling partner of Coombs, Ryland, and Blackwells, making semi-annual two-month-long horseback journeys through Ohio, Indiana, and Illinois, selling hardware to country merchants and collecting payments due the firm.

All the Blackwell siblings had been imbued with a philosophy of personal improvement and working for the betterment of mankind, as well as a deep interest in literature, languages, music, and art. Possessing a special passion for literature, Henry Blackwell wrote poetry in his spare time and always carried several books with him to make every spare moment "useful" and "self-improving." He was a founding member of the Literary Club of Cincinnati, whose members discussed literature and debated issues of the day. He and fellow club member Ainsworth R. Spofford made business trips together, during which they relieved the tedium of slow travel by reading aloud to each other the works of Bacon, Shakespeare, Aristotle, and Plato. Through this club, whose early members included not only Spofford, who would become chief librarian of the Library of Congress, but also Rutherford B. Hayes and Salmon P. Chase, Blackwell formed lasting friendships with men who played prominent roles in the history of Ohio and the nation.

== Blackwell siblings ==
Henry Blackwell's eldest sister, Anna Blackwell (1816–1900), became a poet, translator, and journalist. She was a member of the Brook Farm community in 1845 but settled in France thereafter, where she translated the works of the French socialist Fourier and the novels of George Sand. She was also a contributing correspondent for several newspapers in the United States, India, Australia, South Africa, and Canada.

Marian Blackwell (1818–1897) taught school in her younger years but became a semi-invalid and lived with and looked after other family members.

The best-known of Blackwell's siblings was Elizabeth Blackwell (1821–1910), the first woman to earn a medical degree in the United States. In 1853 she founded the New York Dispensary for Poor Women and Children, and in 1857, with sister Emily and Maria Zakrzewska, established the New York Infirmary for Indigent Women and Children.

Samuel Charles Blackwell (1823–1901), only a year and a half older than Henry, was bookkeeper and businessman, best known as the husband of Antoinette (Brown) Blackwell, the first woman ordained as a minister in the United States and prominent speaker and suffragist.

Henry had four younger siblings. Emily Blackwell (1826–1910), who was the third woman to earn a medical degree in the United States. In addition to co-founding the New York Infirmary, she helped organize the Women's Central Association of Relief, which selected and trained nurses for service in the Civil War.

Sarah Ellen Blackwell (1828–1901) was an artist and author best known for writing the first full-length biography of Anna Ella Carroll.

(John) Howard Blackwell (1831–1866) returned to England and worked in iron manufacturing with a cousin, then joined the East India Company. His death at the age of 36 was a blow to the entire family.

George Washington Blackwell (1832–1912), the only Blackwell sibling born in the United States, became a land agent under Henry's tutelage in the 1850s, studied law in New York City, and took over Henry Blackwell's real estate business in the late 1860s.

== Courtship and marriage ==
Blackwell was smitten by Lucy Stone when he heard her speak at an antislavery meeting in New York in May 1853, moving her audience to tears with what became known as her "fugitive mother" speech. He followed her to Massachusetts and obtained a formal letter of introduction from William Lloyd Garrison. Although Stone gladly accepted him as a friend, she rejected him as a suitor because she believed marriage would require her to surrender control over herself and prevent her from pursuing her chosen work. But Blackwell, not having been rejected personally, determined to convince Stone that marriage to him would require sacrifice of neither individuality nor career. He maintained that a marriage based on equality would enable each of them to accomplish more than they could alone. He, too, wanted to work for the good of humanity, but believed he must wait until he had attained the freedom to command his own time and action—"pecuniary independence," which he expected to achieve in three years.

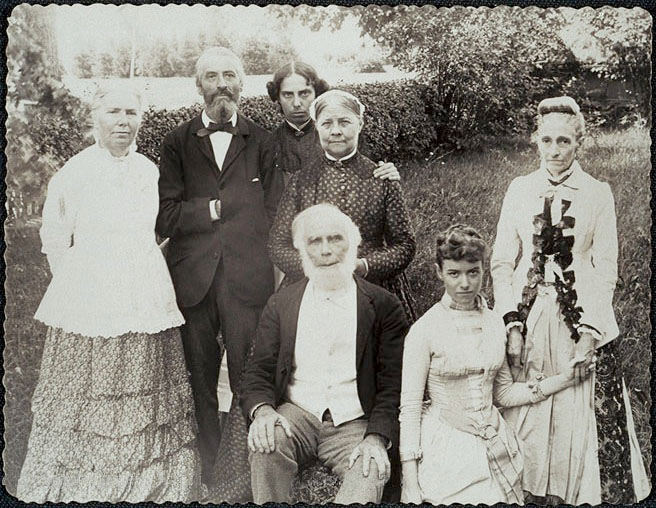
Blackwell with his family, c. 1890

Through correspondence over the summer, Blackwell and Stone discussed the nature and faults of the marriage institution and the benefits of a true, ideal marriage. Then, eager to demonstrate how he could help Stone accomplish more, Blackwell offered to arrange a lecture tour for her in the west (then the mid-western states of Indiana, Illinois, and western Ohio and Kentucky). She accepted, and he wrote to business acquaintances to engage halls and place newspaper notice while personally printing and mailing broadsides for posting. From mid-October 1853 through the first week of January 1854, Stone lectured on women's rights in more than ten cities in five states, including Cincinnati, Louisville, Indianapolis, St. Louis, and Chicago. Newspaper reports described her enthusiastic reception by the largest audiences ever assembled in some of the cities, as well as the deep influence she was having on those who heard her. During an intimate rendezvous before she returned east, Stone expressed not only her deep gratitude to Blackwell for making her success possible, but also a genuine affection. Nevertheless, she remained resolute about never placing herself in the legal position occupied by a married woman.

As the long-distance courtship continued, Blackwell shifted his arguments to how couples could shape their own marriages, regardless of society's laws. After nine additional months of correspondence and brief meetings, Blackwell met Stone in Pittsburgh for a clandestine three-day rendezvous, after which Stone agreed to marry him.

Through continued correspondence the couple set the terms of a private agreement aimed at protecting Stone's financial independence and personal liberty. Blackwell proposed that their marriage be like a business partnership in monetary matters, with husband and wife being "joint proprietors of everything except the results of previous labors." Neither would have claim to lands belonging to the other, nor any obligation for the other's costs of holding them. While married and living together they would share earnings, but if they should separate, they would relinquish claim to the other's subsequent earnings. Each would have the right to will their property to whomever they pleased unless they had children. Blackwell advised Stone to secure all her money in the hands of a trustee for her benefit. Stone agreed to everything except the issue of marital support. She refused to be supported by Blackwell and insisted on paying half of their mutual expenses. Despite Blackwell's strenuous objection, Stone remained adamant.

In addition to financial independence, Blackwell and Stone agreed that each would enjoy personal independence and autonomy: "Neither partner shall attempt to fix the residence, employment, or habits of the other, nor shall either partner feel bound to live together any longer than is agreeable to both." And Blackwell agreed that Stone would choose "when, where and how often" she would "become a mother." This was Blackwell's way of agreeing that Stone would control their sexual relations as advocated by Henry C. Wright, a copy of whose book Marriage and Parentage; Or, The Reproductive Element in Man, as a Means to His Elevation and Happiness, Stone had earlier given to Blackwell and asked him to accept its principles as what she considered the relationship between husband and wife should be.

=== Protest against marriage laws ===
Blackwell also proposed that as part of their marriage ceremony, he would "renounce all the privileges which the law confers upon me which are not strictly mutual" and "pledge myself to never avail myself of them under any circumstances." The wedding took place at Stone's home in West Brookfield, Massachusetts, on May 1, 1855, with Stone's close friend and coworker Thomas Wentworth Higginson officiating. During the ceremony, Blackwell read the protest that both had signed:

While acknowledging our mutual affection by publicly assuming the relationship of husband and wife, yet in justice to ourselves and a great principle, we deem it our duty to declare that this act on our part implies no sanction of or promise of voluntary obedience to such of the present laws of marriage as refuse to recognize the wife as an independent, rational being, while they confer upon the husband an injurious and unnatural superiority, investing him with legal powers which no honorable man should possess. We protest especially against the laws which give the husband:

1. The custody of the wife's person.
2. The exclusive control and guardianship of their children.
3. The sole ownership of her personal and use of her real estate, unless previously settled upon her or placed in the hands of trustees, as in the case of minors, idiots, and lunatics.
4. The absolute right to the product of her industry.
5. Also against laws which give to the widower so much larger and more permanent interest in the property of the deceased wife than they give to the widow in that of the deceased husband.
6. Finally, against the whole system by which the legal existence of the wife is suspended during marriage, so that, in most States, she neither has a legal part in the choice of her residence, nor can she make a will, nor sue or be sued in her own name, nor inherit property.

We believe that personal independence and equal human rights can never be forfeited except for crime; that marriage should be an equal and permanent partnership and so recognized by law; that until it is so recognized, married partners should provide against the radical injustice of present laws by every means in their power.
We believe that where domestic difficulties arise, no appeal should be made to legal tribunals under existing laws, but that all difficulties should be submitted to the equitable adjustment of arbitrators mutually chosen.
Thus, reverencing law, we enter our protest against rules and customs which are unworthy of the name since they violate justice, the essence of law.

News of the Stone-Blackwell marriage sped across the country after Higginson sent an announcement and copy of their protest to the Worcester Spy. While it drew amused ridicule from some commentators who viewed it as a protest against marriage itself, it inspired other couples to make similar protests part of their wedding ceremonies.

On Sunday, September 14, 1857, Blackwell was at home for the birth of the couple's daughter, Alice, delivered by Blackwell's sister Emily. Two years later, while the family was living temporarily in Chicago, Stone miscarried and they lost a baby boy.

== Business and investments ==
In January 1856, Blackwell and his brother Sam sold their interests in the hardware company, and the entire family moved east. In October, Blackwell took a position with C. M. Saxton and Company, publisher of agricultural books. During his first year with the company, as he traveled through the west selling books to farmers’ libraries, he developed a new venture for the company – selling a collection of books suitable as a basic library for district schools. After consulting with the Illinois superintendent of schools, he compiled a list of appropriate books, arranged for special terms from publishers, and obtained a contract from the state of Illinois authorizing the firm to sell to school districts. However, when the Panic of 1857 threatened the firm's survival, Blackwell withdrew until the company could reorganize. During the interlude, he worked as a bookkeeper for the Vanderbilt steamship line. When he returned to the book company at the end of August 1857, Augustus Moore had taken sole ownership and the firm was renamed the A.O. Moore Company. Moore put Blackwell in charge of the "school libraries" enterprise, and in the spring of 1858 Blackwell established an office in Chicago from which he obtained endorsements, arranged publicity, corresponded with school officials in each of the state's one hundred counties, and hired agents to canvass the state. So successful was the venture that Blackwell contacted school officials in other states about introducing the books there and Moore doubled his salary to $3,000. The following year, Stone and their daughter accompanied him to Chicago, where the family lived for nine months while Blackwell managed the school libraries venture. When they returned in the fall of 1859, Moore's failing health forced him to sell the company, and Blackwell left as well.

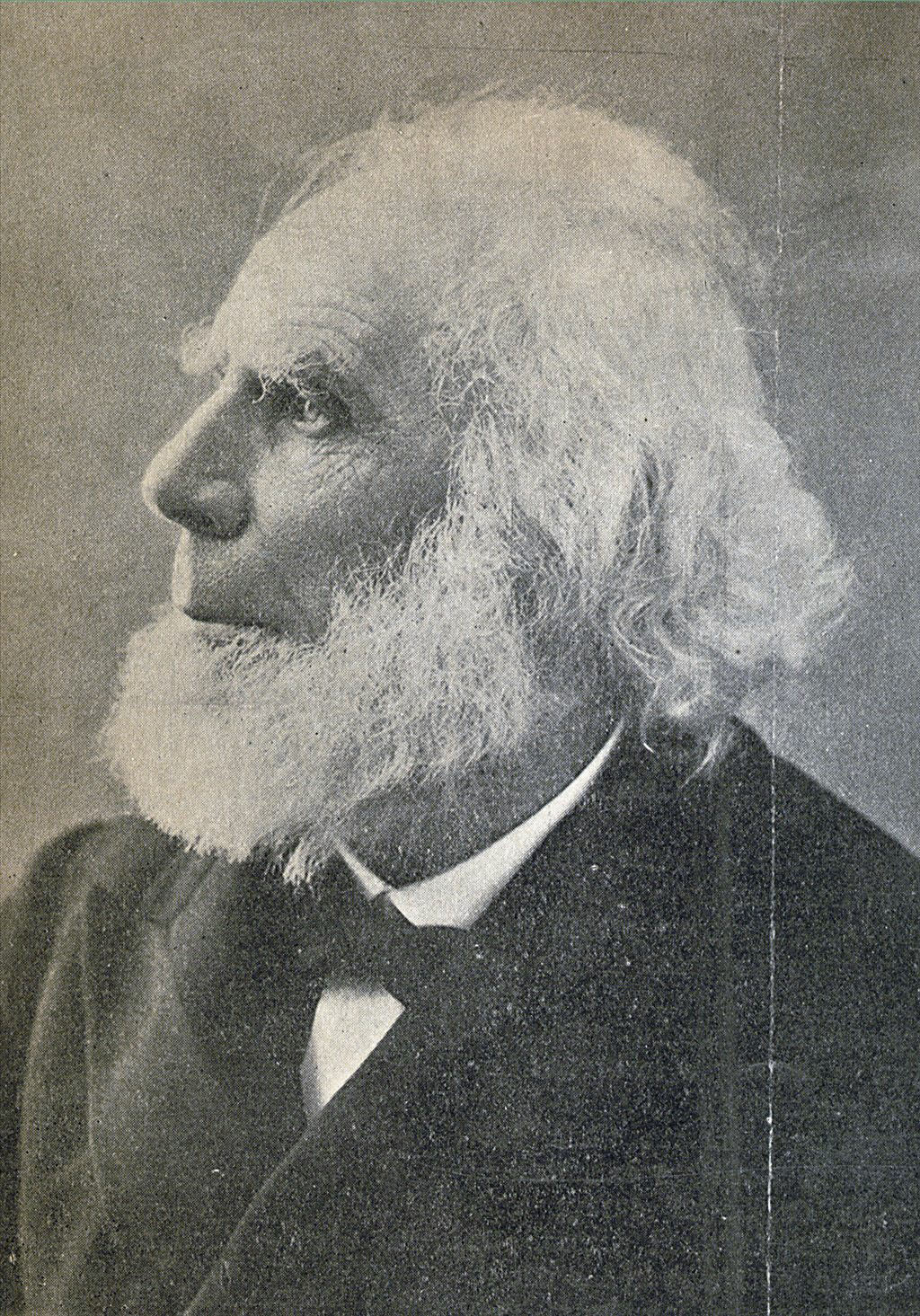
Blackwell c. 1909

During the 1850s land boom, the entire Blackwell family were avid land speculators, purchasing land first in Illinois and later in Wisconsin, Iowa, and Minnesota. In December 1853, a group of Cincinnati businessmen hired Blackwell to be their agent in purchasing 640-acre sections of land in Wisconsin, which the government was selling on easy terms. As compensation, Blackwell received ten percent of the land he registered. By the time he married in the spring of 1855, Blackwell owned more than forty-eight hundred acres of Wisconsin land in addition to land he had purchased elsewhere.

When Lucy Stone married into the Blackwell family, she became an eager investor too but kept her purchases and accounts separate from her husband's. In 1857 they took equal ownership in a house in Orange, New Jersey, for which they traded western lands. They later sold the house to make a down payment on a farm in Montclair, New Jersey, and traded more western land to purchase a neighboring tract. After their return from Illinois in September 1859, Blackwell opened a real estate business, through which, in addition to selling and trading for clients, he traded western land for eastern properties. In this way both he and Stone became owners of a string of rental properties. While they were "land rich," they were "cash poor," so to raise funds for tax and interest payments, Blackwell briefly sold kitchen stoves manufactured by fellow abolitionist Cornelius Bramhill and then, from 1862 to 1864, was bookkeeper for the sugar refining business of one of his father's former employees.

In the summer of 1864, Blackwell sold a large property whose proceeds allowed him to pay off all his debt, including the mortgage on a house he and brother George had purchased for their mother, as well as purchase property on Martha's Vineyard and invest a large sum in government bonds. Additional land trades over the next few years and the rental income they produced gave Blackwell, as his daughter termed it, a "competence" that enabled him "to devote himself fully to the progressive causes which he always had at heart." Around 1872, Stone told Francis J. Garrison in confidence that she and Blackwell could live on their income and thus "cheerfully give" their time and effort to the Woman's Journal. Blackwell continued to dabble in business that interested him. In 1871 he was part of a presidential committee sent to Santo Domingo to explore commercial ramifications of a possible annexation, and even after annexation failed he continued to promote a model commercial base in the country. Blackwell continued to be keenly interested in developing a successful alternative to cane sugar as a means of combating slavery in the West Indies. After obtaining a patent for a new refining method, he established the Maine Sugar Beet Company in 1878. Although early in its operation he telegraphed Stone: "Beet sugar manufacture a success. Slavery in Cuba is doomed," he and his partners found it impossible to obtain the quantity of sugar beets to keep the enterprise going, and shut the operation down in 1882.

== Work for Woman Suffrage ==
In the early years of Blackwell's marriage to Lucy Stone, he assisted her work whenever his business schedule permitted. In 1855, he lectured with her in and around Cincinnati during the summer, helped her manage the National Woman's Rights Convention held in Cincinnati that fall, and arranged winter lecture engagements for her in Wisconsin, Indiana, and Ohio. In 1856, he lectured with her in the region around their summer residence in Viroqua, Wisconsin. In the winter of 1857, when the tax bill came for their newly purchased house in Orange, New Jersey, Stone refused to pay on the basis of "no taxation without representation." After submitting to a public auction of household items to pay the tax and attendant court costs, Blackwell and Stone lectured together in Orange on "Taxation without Representation." It was in these February 1858 speeches that Blackwell first argued that woman suffrage was politically expedient no matter a party's principles or goals: Enfranchising women, he said, would allow Republicans to more than double their influence toward abolishing slavery, the American Party to double the number of native-born voters, and Democrats to give votes to labor.

=== Reconstruction issues ===
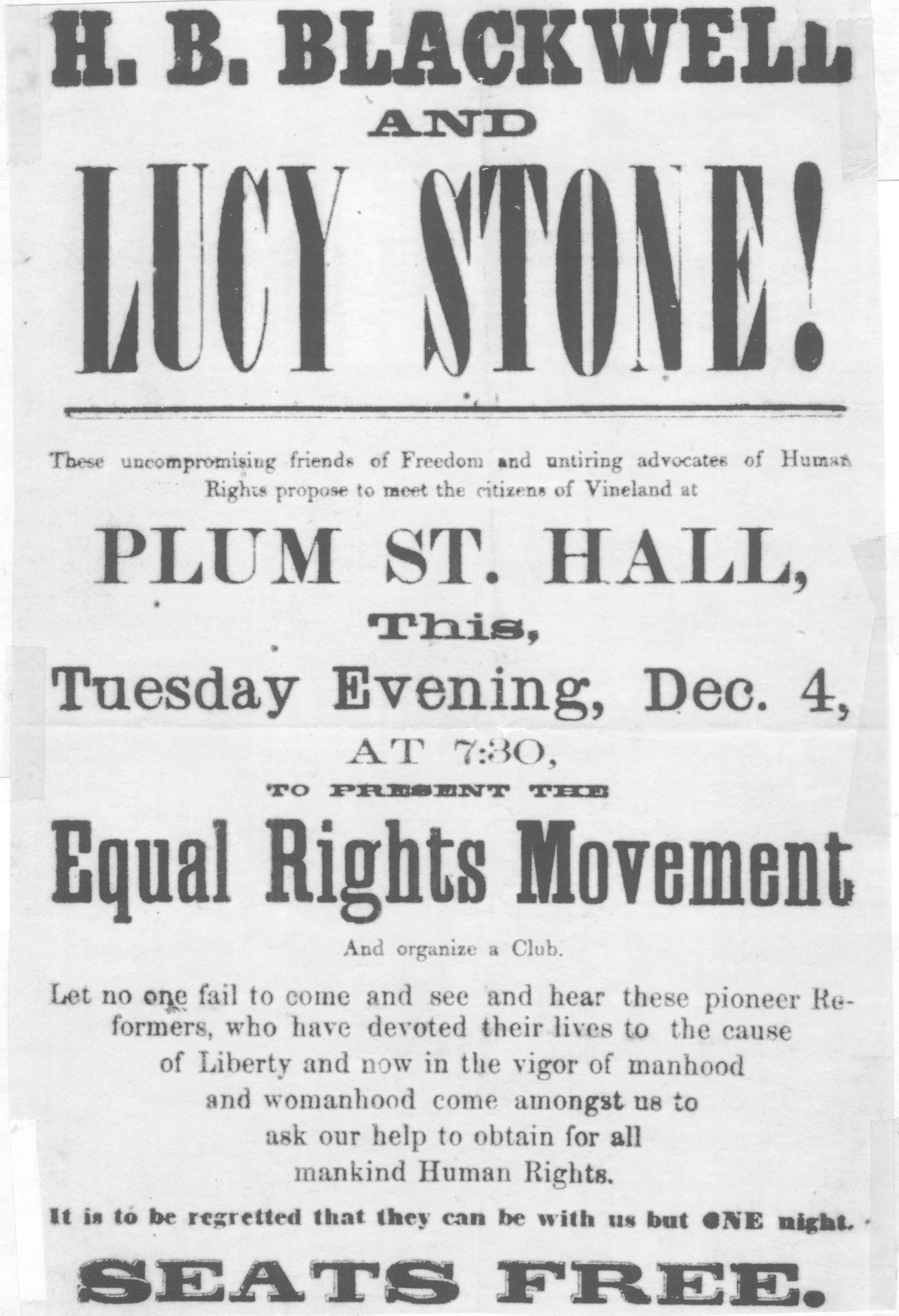
Announcement of Blackwell/Stone speaking engagement in Vineland, New Jersey, in 1866

In 1866, the National Woman's Rights Convention, meeting for the first time since before the Civil War, voted itself into the American Equal Rights Association (AERA) to work for universal suffrage – the vote for both blacks and women. Blackwell served as secretary of this organization during its three-year existence. In the winter of 1866–67, Blackwell and Stone lectured together on universal suffrage and formed local Equal Rights Leagues in New York and New Jersey. They also traveled to Washington, D.C., to lobby Charles Sumner against inclusion of the word "male" in the proposed Fourteenth Amendment, which would penalize states for denying black suffrage but not woman suffrage. Unsuccessful in persuading Northern politicians to use this opportunity to extend the franchise to women, Blackwell published an open letter to Southern legislators titled "What the South Can Do," again arguing that woman suffrage was politically expedient no matter a party's (or in this case, a region's) goals or fears. Using estimated figures of a white male and female electorate and a black male and female electorate, he argued that the vote of white Southern women would counterbalance the combined vote of black men and women.

In the spring of 1867, the AWSA received an appeal for help from Kansas, where voters would face two suffrage referendums in the fall: one for removing the word "male" from voter qualifications, along with one for removing the word "white." Blackwell and Stone left for Kansas in March and opened the campaign. They canvassed the state for two months, returned east full of optimism, and raised funds to send more speakers and tracts.

After their return, Blackwell and Stone also addressed a committee of the Connecticut Legislature in support of removing the word "male" from the state constitution's voter qualifications. Blackwell served a second speaking stint in Kansas in the fall, during which defeat became apparent. Upon his return east, he and Stone turned their full attention to creating a demand for woman suffrage apart from the AERA's call for universal suffrage. After holding a series of woman's rights meetings across New Jersey, they called a state convention to form a state woman suffrage society. The object of the New Jersey Woman Suffrage Association that formed in November 1867 with Lucy Stone as president was to use all available means to secure woman suffrage.

At the AERA convention in May 1868, Stone presented two forms of petition to Congress, one for woman suffrage in the District of Columbia and territories, which could be established by an Act of Congress, and the second for a separate woman suffrage amendment to the federal Constitution. As the petitions circulated in both the east and the west during the following months, Blackwell and Stone continued organizing a woman suffrage movement separate from the AERA and its auxiliaries. In November 1868 they helped found a New England Woman Suffrage Association and in December they helped organize state societies in Rhode Island and New Hampshire. Believing their best chance for winning an amendment to a state constitution lay in Massachusetts, Blackwell spearheaded a movement to form Liberty Leagues across the state – local organizations of male suffragists who pledged to vote only for pro-woman suffrage candidates to the legislature.

After passage of the Fourteenth Amendment, Congressional Republicans began drafting a Fifteenth Amendment to explicitly prohibit states from denying the vote to black men. Again Blackwell and Stone traveled to Washington to lobby for the inclusion of woman suffrage, and again their efforts failed. Meanwhile, Elizabeth Cady Stanton and Susan B. Anthony mounted a campaign opposing any suffrage amendment that did not enfranchise women – seen by many as overt opposition to the Fifteenth Amendment. Disagreement over that amendment divided the May 1869 convention of the AERA. The convention rejected resolutions opposing the Fifteenth Amendment, and when Stanton and Anthony then proposed that the AERA reorganize as a woman suffrage society, the convention accepted Stone's motion that it wait until after ratification of the Fifteenth Amendment so as not to give the appearance of opposition.

Nevertheless, two days later Stanton and Anthony formed the National Woman Suffrage Association, which immediately came out as opposed to the Fifteenth Amendment. With no notice having been given that such a society was to be formed, their critics thus excluded, and no representation from state and local woman suffrage associations then in existence, many long-time suffragists did not view the organization as legitimately "national." The New England Woman Suffrage Association appointed a committee, headed by Stone, to call a convention to form a "truly national" woman suffrage organization with delegates from each state. The American Woman Suffrage Association was formed by a national convention meeting in Cleveland, Ohio, on October 24 and 25, 1869. Blackwell drafted its constitution and was elected recording secretary.

=== The Woman's Journal ===
The New England Woman Suffrage Association also established the Woman's Journal, a weekly woman suffrage newspaper that became the organ of the American, New England, and Massachusetts woman suffrage associations. Henry Blackwell donated the first $1,000 of the $10,000 raised to start the paper, was one of three trustees under whom the joint stock company was incorporated, and was always the paper's largest shareholder.[44] In 1872, both he and Stone became editors and thereafter edited the Woman's Journal together, joined by their daughter, Alice Stone Blackwell, in 1881. After Stone's death in 1893, Blackwell continued editing until his death in 1909. He never took a salary for his work on the Woman's Journal, which became the longest-running suffrage paper in the nation (1870–1917).

=== Campaigner and Strategist ===
Blackwell was an officer of the American Woman Suffrage Association (AWSA) for many years, including being its president in 1880. He was also an officer of the New England and Massachusetts Woman Suffrage Associations, all of which shared offices with the Woman's Journal in Boston. Through involvement in Republican politics, he obtained a strong endorsement of woman suffrage from the Massachusetts Republican Party in 1872. As one of the American wing's most effective orators, Blackwell spoke on organizing tours, before state and local suffrage meetings and conventions, at hearings before state legislatures and constitutional conventions, and at hearings before Congressional committees. He and Stone worked together on several state campaigns, including Colorado in 1877 and Nebraska in 1882. After frail health kept Stone from traveling, Blackwell continued on without her, campaigning in Rhode Island in 1887 and South Dakota in 1890. One scholar characterized their work saying, "In the annals of the suffrage movement, Lucy Stone and Henry Blackwell were as much a team as Elizabeth Cady Stanton and Susan B. Anthony." Stone thanked Blackwell for the "abundant and unselfish work [he did] for women," saying, "Few men would have done it, leaving business, friends, pleasure for it."

Blackwell originated the AWSA's strategy of seeking partial suffrage by legislative action. Noting that state legislatures could establish women's right to both municipal suffrage (the right to vote in city elections) and presidential suffrage (the right to vote for presidential electors) through statute, he argued that such measures might be more readily gained than constitutional amendments, which after passage by a legislature had to then be ratified by the populace. He also noted that no constitutional amendment was required for Congress to establish full woman suffrage in either the District of Columbia or the territories. Believing that achieving such measures would undercut arguments against women's voting and become a permanent wedge for full suffrage, he urged that "every point gained is a great step forward."

The AWSA campaigned widely for municipal and presidential suffrage, especially during the 1880s and 1890s. After the merger of the American and National wings in 1890, Blackwell was made chair of the united association's Committee on Presidential Suffrage. Before the woman suffrage amendment to the federal Constitution passed in 1920, eleven states had established presidential suffrage, and four of those had granted municipal suffrage at the same time.

Another strategy Blackwell devised was aimed at constitutional conventions. In 1889 when the territories of North Dakota, Montana, and Washington began drafting state constitutions for entry into the Union, the AWSA mobilized to press for inclusion of woman suffrage. But Blackwell realized the chances for success were slim and devised a backup plan – persuading pro-suffrage delegates, if and when it became apparent a suffrage provision would fail, to push for a clause that would enable a future state legislature to extend suffrage to women by statute. Blackwell obtained endorsements for the strategy from leading politicians and judges in other states, traveled to the constitutional conventions, lobbied their leaders, got his resolution introduced, and was given a hearing at each one. Though the effort failed, North Dakota and Montana came very close to adopting it.

== Death ==
Blackwell died of inflammation of the bowels in 1909.

== Legacy ==
Alice Stone Blackwell, the daughter of Blackwell and Lucy Stone, helped her parents in editing the Woman's Journal; she became another leader for women's rights as well as for the Temperance movement and Prohibition.

== Writings ==
- "Equal Suffrage vs. Prostitution"
- "The Lesson of Colorado" (1877)
- "Objections to Woman Suffrage Answered"

== See also ==
- List of suffragists and suffragettes
- List of women's rights activists
- Timeline of women's suffrage

== Bibliography ==
- Blackwell, Alice Stone. Lucy Stone: Pioneer of Woman's Rights. 1930. Reprint, University Press of Virginia, 2001. ISBN 0-8139-1990-8
- Blackwell, Alice Stone. "What I Owe to My Father." Holt, 1931, pp. 35–48. Reprint, with an introduction by Peter C. Engleman, Alice Stone Blackwell Trust: 1999.
- Hays, Elinor Rice. Morning Star: A Biography of Lucy Stone 1818–1893. Harcourt, Brace & World, 1961. ISBN 0-374-93756-7, OCLC 500879
- Hays, Elinor Rice. Those Extraordinary Blackwells: The Story of a Journey to a Better World. Harcourt, 1967. ASIN BOO1EVC4CG
- Kerr, Andrea Moore. Lucy Stone: Speaking Out for Equality. New Jersey: Rutgers University Press, 1992. ISBN 0-8135-1860-1
- Million, Joelle. Woman's Voice, Woman's Place: Lucy Stone and the Birth of the Women's Rights Movement. Praeger, 2003. ISBN 0-275-97877-X
- Wheeler, Leslie. Loving Warriors: Selected Letters of Lucy Stone and Henry B. Blackwell, 1853–1893. Dial Press, 1981. ISBN 0-8037-9469-X
