= Lucy Stone =

American abolitionist and suffragist (1818–1893)

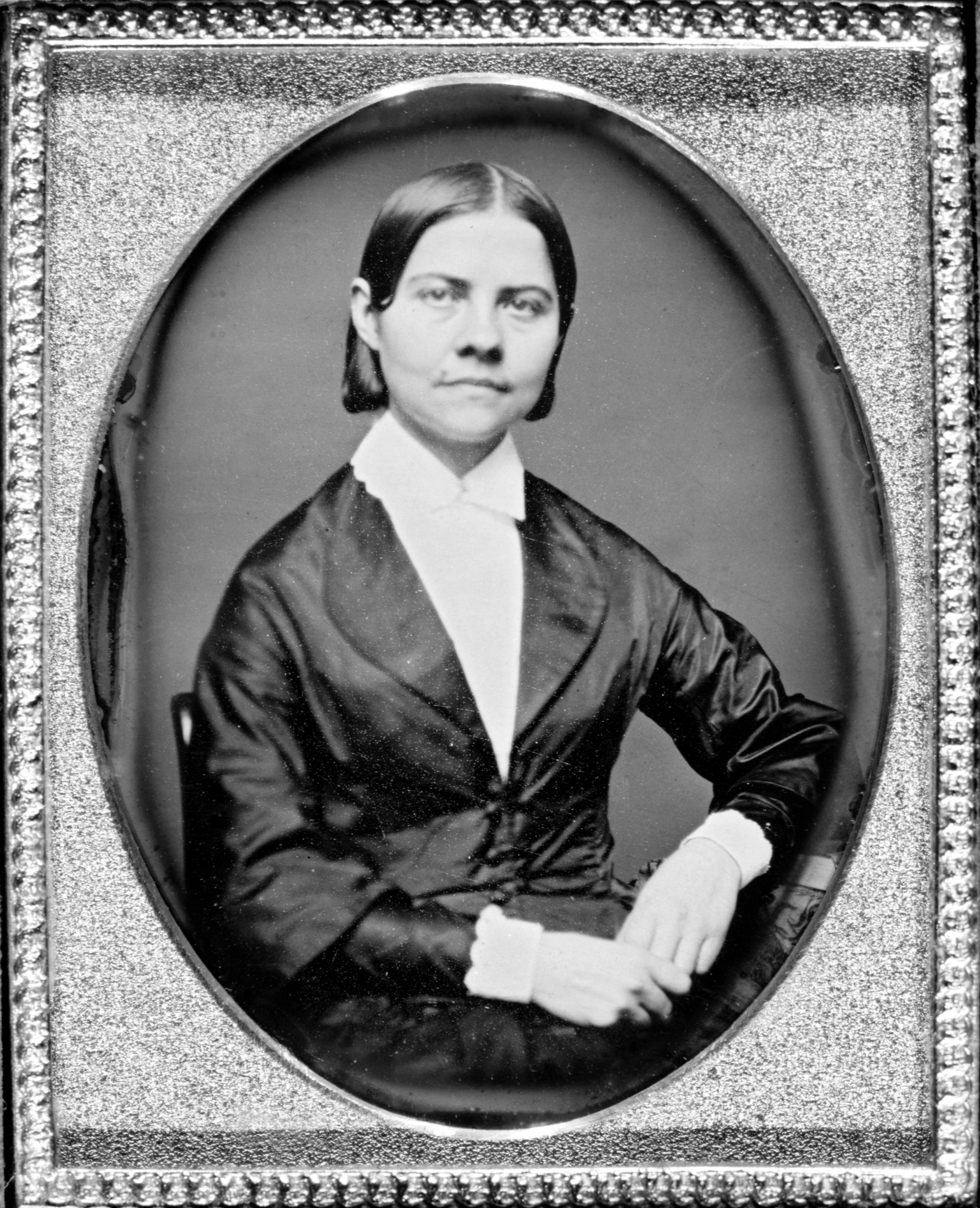
- Daguerreotype of Lucy Stone, c. 1840–1860
- Born: August 13, 1818; West Brookfield, Massachusetts, U.S.
- Died: October 18, 1893 (aged 75); Boston, Massachusetts, U.S.
- Education: Oberlin College (BA)
- Known for: Abolitionist; Suffragist; Women's rights activist
- Spouse: Henry Browne Blackwell (m. 1855)
- Children: Alice Stone Blackwell

Lucy Stone (August 13, 1818 – October 18, 1893) was an American orator, abolitionist and suffragist who was a vocal advocate for and organizer of promoting rights for women. In 1847, Stone became the first woman from Massachusetts to earn a college degree. She spoke out for women's rights and campaigned against slavery. Stone was known for using her birth name, after marriage, contrary to the custom of women taking their husband's surname.

Stone's organizational activities for the cause of women's rights yielded tangible gains in the difficult political environment of the 19th century. Stone helped initiate the first National Women's Rights Convention in Worcester, Massachusetts, and she supported and sustained it, annually, along with a number of other local, regional, and state activist conventions. Stone spoke in front of a number of legislative bodies, to promote laws giving more rights to women. She assisted in establishing the Woman's National Loyal League to help pass the Thirteenth Amendment and thereby abolish slavery, after which she helped form the American Woman Suffrage Association (AWSA), which built support for a woman suffrage Constitutional amendment by winning woman suffrage at the local and state levels.

Stone wrote, extensively, about a wide range of women's rights, publishing and distributing speeches by herself and others, and convention proceedings. In the long-running and influential Woman's Journal, a weekly periodical that she founded and promoted, Stone aired both her own and differing views about women's rights. Called "the orator", the "morning star," and the "heart and soul" of the women's rights movement, Stone influenced Susan B. Anthony to take up the cause of women's suffrage. Elizabeth Cady Stanton wrote that "Lucy Stone was the first person by whom the heart of the American public was deeply stirred on the woman question." Together, Anthony, Stanton, and Stone have been called the 19th-century "triumvirate" of women's suffrage and feminism.

== Early life and influences ==
Lucy Stone was born on August 13, 1818, on her family's farm at Coy's Hill in West Brookfield, Massachusetts. She was the eighth of nine children born to Hannah Matthews and Francis Stone. She grew up with three brothers and three sisters, two siblings having died before her own birth. Another member of the Stone household was Sarah Barr, known as "Aunt Sally" to the children, who was a sister of Francis Stone who had been abandoned by her husband and left dependent on her brother. Although farm life was hard work for all and Francis Stone tightly managed the family resources, Lucy remembered her childhood as one of "opulence,” the farm producing all the food the family wanted and enough extra to trade for the few store-bought goods they needed.

When Stone recalled that "There was only one will in our family, and that was my father's", she described the family government characteristic of her day. Hannah Stone earned a modest income through selling eggs and cheese but was denied any control over that money, sometimes denied money to purchase things Francis considered trivial. Believing she had a right to her own earnings, Hannah sometimes stole coins from his purse or secretly sold a cheese. As a child, Lucy resented instances of what she saw as her father's unfair management of the family's money. But she later came to realize that custom was to blame, and the injustice only demonstrated "the necessity of making custom right, if it must rule."

From the examples of her mother, Aunt Sally, and a neighbor neglected by her husband and left destitute, Stone early learned that women were at the mercy of their husbands' good will. When she came across the biblical passage "and thy desire shall be to thy husband, and he shall rule over thee,” she was distraught over what appeared to be divine sanction of women's subjugation, but then, she reasoned that the injunction applied only to wives. Resolving to "call no man my master,” she determined to keep control over her own life by never marrying, obtaining the highest education she could, and earning her own livelihood.

One of her biographers, Andrea Moore Kerr, writes, "Stone's personality was striking: her unquestioning willingness to take responsibility for other people's actions; her 'workaholic' habits; her self doubt; her desire for control."

=== Teaching at "a woman's pay" ===
At age 16, Stone began teaching in district schools, as her brothers and her sister, Rhoda, also did. Her beginning pay of $1.00 a day was much lower than that of male teachers, and when she substituted for her brother, Bowman, one winter, she received less pay than he received. When she protested to the school committee that she had taught all the subjects Bowman had, it replied that they could give her "only a woman's pay." Lower pay for women was one of the arguments cited by those promoting the hiring of women as teachers: "To make education universal, it must be at moderate expense, and women can afford to teach for one-half, or even less, the salary which men would ask." Although Stone's salary increased along with the size of her schools, until she finally received $16 a month, it was always lower than the male rate.

=== The "woman question" ===
In 1836, Stone began reading newspaper reports of a controversy raging throughout Massachusetts that some referred to as the "woman question" – what was woman's proper role in society; should she assume an active and public role in the reform movements of the day? Developments within that controversy, over the next several years, shaped her evolving philosophy on women's rights.

A debate over whether women were entitled to a political voice had begun, when many women responded to William Lloyd Garrison's appeal to circulate antislavery petitions and sent thousands of signatures to Congress, only to have them rejected, in part, because women had sent them. Women abolitionists responded by holding a convention in New York City to expand their petitioning efforts and declaring that "as certain rights and duties are common to all moral beings,” they would no longer remain within limits prescribed by "corrupt custom and a perverted application of Scripture." After sisters Angelina and Sarah Grimké began speaking to audiences of men and women, instead of women-only groups as was acceptable at the time, a state convention of Congregational ministers issued a pastoral letter condemning women's assumption of "the place of man as a public reformer" and "itinerat[ing] in the character of public lecturers and teachers." Stone attended the convention as a spectator and was so angered by the letter that she determined, "if ever [I] had anything to say in public, [I] would say it, and all the more, because of that pastoral letter."

Stone read Sarah Grimké's "Letters on the Province of Woman" (later republished as "Letters on the Equality of the Sexes"), and told a brother they only reinforced her resolve "to call no man master." She drew from these "Letters," when writing college essays and later, her women's rights lectures.

Having determined to obtain the highest education she could, Stone enrolled at Mount Holyoke Female Seminary in 1839, at the age of 21. But she was so disappointed in Mary Lyon's intolerance of antislavery and women's rights that she withdrew after only one term. The very next month, she enrolled at Wesleyan Academy (later Wilbraham & Monson Academy), which she found more to her liking: "It was decided by a large majority in our literary society the other day," she reported to a brother "that ladies ought to mingle in politics, go to Congress, etc. etc." Stone read a newspaper account of how a Connecticut antislavery meeting had denied the right to speak or vote to Abby Kelley, recently hired as an antislavery agent to work in that state. Refusing to relinquish her right, Kelley had defiantly raised her hand every time a vote was taken. "I admire the calm and noble bearing of Abby K," Stone wrote to a brother, "and cannot but wish there were more kindred spirits."

Three years later, Stone followed Kelley's example. In 1843, a deacon was expelled from Stone's church for his antislavery activities, which included supporting Kelley by hosting her at his home and driving her to lectures that she gave in the vicinity. When the first vote for expulsion was taken, Stone raised her hand in his defense. The minister discounted her vote, saying that, though she was a member of the church, she was not a voting member. Like Kelley, she stubbornly raised her hand for each of the remaining five votes.

After completing a year at coeducational Monson Academy in the summer of 1841, Stone learned that Oberlin Collegiate Institute in Ohio had become the first college in the nation to admit women and had bestowed college degrees on three women. Stone enrolled at Quaboag Seminary in neighboring Warren, where she read Virgil and Sophocles and studied Latin and Greek grammar, in preparation for Oberlin's entrance examinations.

== Oberlin ==
In August 1843, just after she turned 25, Stone traveled by train, steamboat, and stagecoach to Oberlin College in Ohio, the country's first college to admit both women and African Americans. She entered the college believing that women should vote and assume political office, that women should study the classic professions, and that women should be able to speak their minds in a public forum. Oberlin College did not share all of these sentiments.

In her third year at Oberlin, Stone befriended Antoinette Brown, an abolitionist and suffragist who came to Oberlin in 1845 to study to become a minister. Stone and Brown would eventually marry abolitionist brothers and thus become sisters-in-law.

=== Equal pay strike ===
Stone hoped to earn most of her college expenses through teaching in one of the institute's lower departments. But because of its policy against employing first-year students as teachers, the only work Stone could get other than teaching at district schools during the winter break was housekeeping chores through the school's manual labor program. For this, she was paid three cents an hour—less than half of what male students received for their work in the program. Among measures taken to reduce her expenses, Stone prepared her own meals in her dormitory room. In 1844, Stone was given a position teaching arithmetic in the Ladies Department, but, again, received reduced pay because of her sex.

Oberlin's compensation policies required Stone to do twice the labor a male student had to do to pay the same costs. Stone frequently rose at two o'clock to fit in work and study, and she found her health declining. In February 1845, having decided to submit to the injustice no longer, she asked the Faculty Board for the same pay given two lesser-experienced male colleagues. When her request was denied, she resigned her position. Pleading with the faculty to restore Stone, her former students said they would pay Stone "what was right," if the college would not. Stone had planned to borrow money from her father when funds ran out, but Francis Stone, moved by his daughter's description of her struggles, promised to provide money when needed. Help from home was not needed, however, because after three months of pressure, the faculty yielded and hired Stone back, paying both her and other women student teachers at the same rate they paid male student teachers.

=== Public speaking ===
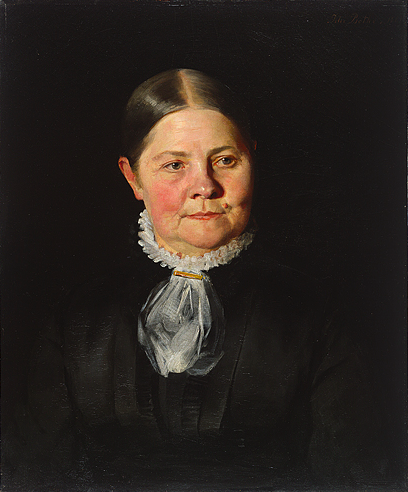
1881 portrait of Lucy Stone

In February 1846, Stone intimated to Abby Kelley Foster that she was thinking of becoming a public speaker, but not until the following summer when a storm of controversy over Foster's speaking at Oberlin would the matter be decided for her. Faculty opposition to Foster ignited impassioned discussion of women's rights among the students, especially of a woman's right to speak in public, which Stone vigorously defended in a joint meeting of the men's and women's literary societies. She followed that campus demonstration by making her first public speech at Oberlin's August 1 commemoration of Emancipation in the West Indies.

In the fall of 1846, Stone informed her family of her intention to become a women's rights lecturer. Her brothers were, at once, supportive, and her father encouraged her to do what she considered her duty. Her mother and her only remaining sister, however, begged her to reconsider. To her mother's fears that she would be reviled, Stone said she knew she would be disesteemed and even hated, but she must "pursue that course of conduct which, to me, appears best calculated to promote the highest good of the world."

Stone, then, tried to gain practical speaking experience. Although women students could debate each other in their literary society, it was considered inappropriate for them to participate in oral exercises with men; women members of the collegiate rhetoric class were expected to learn by observing their male classmates. So, Stone and first-year student Antoinette Brown, who also wanted to develop skill in public speaking, organized an off-campus women's debating club. After gaining a measure of competence, they sought and received permission to debate each other before Stone's rhetoric class. The debate attracted a large student audience, as well as attention from the Faculty Board, which, thereupon, formally banned women's oral exercises in coeducational classes. Shortly thereafter, Stone accepted a challenge from a former editor of a county newspaper to a public debate on women's rights, and she soundly defeated him. She, then, submitted a petition to the Faculty Board, signed by most members of her graduating class, asking that women chosen to write graduation essays be permitted to read them, themselves, as men so honored did, instead of having them read by faculty members. When the Faculty Board refused and Stone was elected to write an essay, she declined, saying she could not support a principle that denied women "the privilege of being co-laborers with men in any sphere to which their ability makes them adequate."

Stone received her baccalaureate degree from Oberlin College on August 25, 1847, becoming the first female college graduate from Massachusetts.

== Antislavery apprenticeship ==
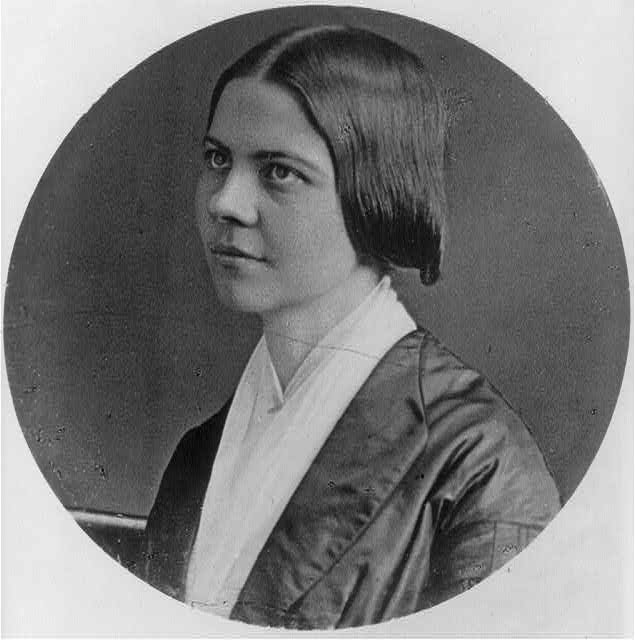
Lucy Stone as a young woman

Stone gave her first public speeches on women's rights in the fall of 1847, first at her brother Bowman's church in Gardner, Massachusetts, and later in Warren. Stone became a lecturing agent for the Massachusetts Anti-Slavery Society in June 1848, persuaded by Abby Kelley Foster that the experience would give her the speaking practice she still felt she needed, before beginning her women's rights campaign. Stone immediately proved to be an effective speaker, reported to wield extraordinary persuasive power over her audiences. She was described as "a little meek-looking Quakerish body, with the sweetest, modest manners, and yet, as unshrinking and self-possessed as a loaded cannon." One of her assets, in addition to a storytelling ability that could move audiences to tears or laughter as she willed, was said to be an unusual voice that contemporaries compared to a "silver bell," and of which it was said, "no more perfect instrument had ever been bestowed upon a speaker."

In addition to helping Stone develop as an orator, the antislavery agency introduced her to a network of progressive reformers within the Garrisonian wing of the abolition movement who assisted her women's rights work. In the fall of 1848, she received an invitation from Phoebe Hathaway of Farmington, New York, to lecture for the women who had organized the Seneca Falls women's rights convention and the Rochester women's rights convention, earlier that summer. These rights conventions provided continuity for the woman's rights movement, even though no official organization was actually formed, prior to the Civil War. Most of the well-known leaders, at the time, attended these conventions, except for those who were ill or sick. The best-known of them, Elizabeth Cady Stanton, Susan B. Anthony, and Lucy Stone, met and worked together harmoniously, as they wrote, discussed, and circulated petitions for the woman's rights movement. Although Stone accepted and expected to begin working for them in the fall of 1849, the agency never materialized. In April 1849, Stone was invited to lecture for the Philadelphia Female Anti-Slavery Society, and Lucretia Mott took advantage of her presence to hold Pennsylvania's first women's rights meeting on May 4, 1849. With the help of abolitionists, Stone conducted Massachusetts's first petition campaigns for the right of women to vote and hold public office. Wendell Phillips drafted the first petitions and accompanying appeals for circulation, and William Lloyd Garrison published them in The Liberator for readers to copy and circulate. When Stone sent petitions to the legislature in February 1850, over half were from towns where she had lectured.

== National Woman's Rights Convention ==
In April 1850, the Ohio Women's Convention met in Salem, Ohio a few weeks before a state convention met to revise the Ohio state constitution. The women's convention sent a communication to the constitutional convention requesting that the new constitution secure the same political and legal rights for women that were guaranteed to men. Stone sent a letter praising their initiative and said, "Massachusetts ought to have taken the lead in the work you are now doing, but if she chooses to linger, let her young sisters of the West set her a worthy example; and if the 'Pilgrim spirit is not dead,' we'll pledge Massachusetts to follow her." Some of the leaders asked Stone and Lucretia Mott to address the constitutional convention on their behalf, but believing such appeals should come from residents of the state, they declined.

Women's rights conventions up to this point had been organized on a regional or state basis. During the annual convention of the American Anti-Slavery Society in Boston in 1850, with the support of Garrison and other abolitionists, Stone and Paulina Wright Davis posted a notice for a meeting to consider the possibility of organizing a women's rights convention on a national basis. The meeting was held at Boston's Melodeon Hall on May 30, 1850. Davis presided while Stone presented the proposal to the large and responsive audience and served as secretary. Seven women were appointed to organize the convention, with Davis and Stone assigned to conduct the correspondence needed to solicit signatures to the call and recruit speakers and attendance.

A few months before the convention, Stone contracted typhoid fever while traveling in Indiana and nearly died. The protracted nature of Stone's illness left Davis as the principal organizer of the first National Women's Rights Convention, which met on October 23–24, 1850, in Brinley Hall in Worcester, Massachusetts, with an attendance of about a thousand. Stone was able to attend the Worcester convention, but her frail health limited her participation, and she made no formal address until the closing session. The convention decided not to establish a formal association but to exist as an annual convention with a standing committee to arrange its meetings, publish its proceedings, and execute adopted plans of action. Stone was appointed to the Central Committee of nine women and nine men. The following spring, she became secretary of the committee, and, except for one year, she retained that position until 1858. As secretary, Stone took a leading part in organizing and setting the agenda for the national conventions, throughout the decade.

== Woman's rights orator ==
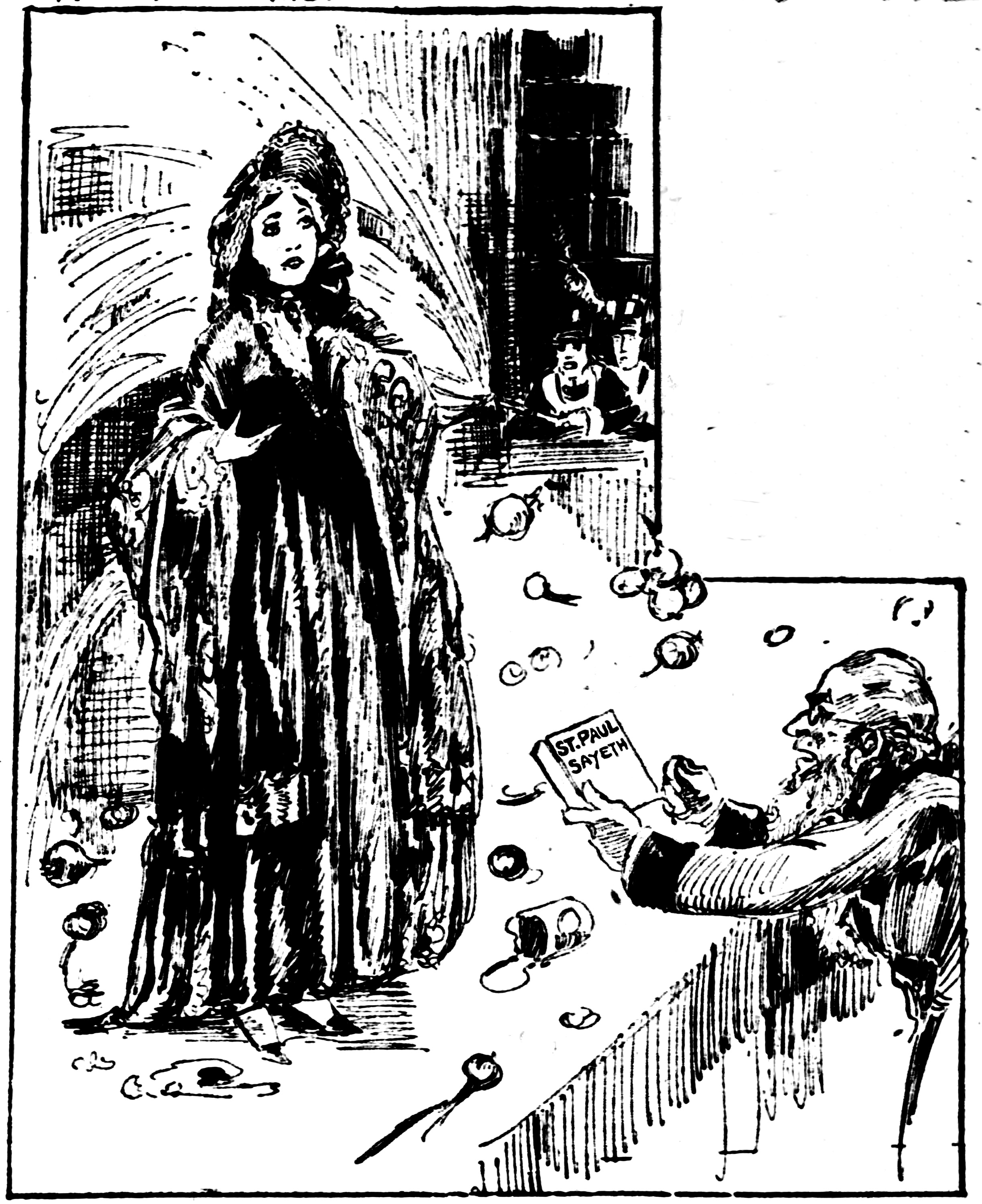
Fanciful 1919 drawing by Marguerite Martyn of Lucy Stone as a young woman being pelted with vegetables as she speaks. At right, jeering men spray her with a hose, and another man displays a book titled St. Paul Sayeth.

In May 1851, while in Boston attending the New England Anti-Slavery Society's annual meeting, Stone went to the exhibit of Hiram Powers's statue The Greek Slave. She was so moved by the sculpture that when she addressed the meeting that evening, she poured out her heart about the statue being emblematic of all enchained womanhood. Stone said the society's general agent, Samuel May, Jr., reproached her for speaking on women's rights at an antislavery meeting, and she replied, "I was a woman, before I was an abolitionist. I must speak for women." Three months later, Stone notified May that she intended to lecture on women's rights full-time, and she would not be available for antislavery work. Stone launched her career as an independent women's rights lecturer on October 1, 1851. When May continued to press antislavery work upon her, she agreed to lecture for the Massachusetts Anti-Slavery Society on Sundays. Arranging women's rights lectures around these engagements, she used pay for her antislavery work to defray expenses of her independent lecturing until she felt confident enough to charge admission.

=== Dress reform ===
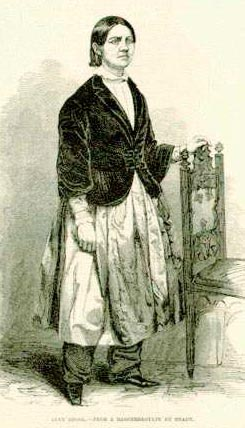
An engraving of Lucy Stone wearing bloomers was published in 1853.

When Stone resumed lecturing in the fall of 1851, she wore a new style of dress that she had adopted during her winter convalescence, consisting of a loose, short jacket and a pair of baggy trousers, which were under a skirt that fell a few inches below the knees. The dress was a product of the health-reform movement and intended to replace the fashionable French dress of a tight bodice over a whalebone-fitted corset and a skirt that dragged several inches on the floor worn over several layers of starched petticoats with straw or horsehair sewn into the hems. Ever since the fall of 1849, when the Water-Cure Journal urged women to invent a style of dress that would allow them to use their legs freely, women across the country had been wearing some form of pants and short skirt, generally called the "Turkish costume" or the "American dress." Most wore it as a walking or gardening dress, but a letter writer to the National Woman's Rights Convention urged women to adopt it as common attire.

By the spring of 1851, women in several states were wearing the dress in public. In March, Amelia Bloomer, editor of the temperance newspaper The Lily, announced that she was wearing it and printed a description of her dress, along with instructions on how to make it. Soon, newspapers dubbed it the Bloomer dress, and the name stuck. The Bloomer became a fashion fad during the following months, as women from Toledo to New York City and Lowell, Massachusetts, held reform-dress social events and festivals. Supporters gathered signatures to a "Declaration of Independence from the Despotism of Parisian Fashion" and organized dress-reform societies. A few Garrisonian supporters of women's rights took prominent part in these activities, and one offered silk to any of his friends who would make it into a short skirt and trousers for a public dress. Stone accepted the offer.

When Stone lectured in the dress in the fall of 1851, hers was the first Bloomer most of her audiences had ever seen. But by then, the dress had become controversial. Although newspapers had initially praised the practicality of the new style, they soon turned to ridicule and condemnation, now viewing the trousers as a usurpation of the symbol of male authority. Many women retreated in the face of criticism, but Stone continued to wear the short dress exclusively for the next three years. She also wore her hair short, cut just below her jaw line. After Stone lectured in New York City in April 1853, the report of her speeches in the Illustrated News was accompanied by this engraving of Stone in the Bloomer dress.

Stone found the short skirt convenient during her travels, and she defended it against those who said it was a distraction that hurt the women's rights cause. Nevertheless, she disliked the instant attention it drew whenever she arrived in a new place. In the fall of 1854, she added a dress a few inches longer for occasional use. In 1855, she abandoned the dress altogether, and she was not involved in the formation of a National Dress Reform Association in February 1856. Her resumption of long skirts drew the condemnation of such dress-reform leaders as Gerrit Smith and Lydia Sayer Hasbrouk, who accused her of sacrificing principle for the sake of pleasing a husband.

=== Expulsion from church ===
Stone's anti-slavery work included harsh criticism of churches that refused to condemn slavery. Her own church in West Brookfield, the First Congregational Church of West Brookfield, was one of those, having expelled a deacon for anti-slavery activities. In 1851, the church expelled Stone herself. Stone had already moved significantly away from that church's Trinitarian doctrines. While at Oberlin, Stone had arranged for her friend, Abby Kelley Foster, and her new husband, Stephen Symonds Foster, to speak there on the abolition of slavery. Afterwards, Charles Finney, a prominent professor of theology at Oberlin, denounced the Fosters for their Unitarian beliefs. Intrigued, Stone began to engage in classroom discussions about the Trinitarian-Unitarian controversy and ultimately decided that she was a Unitarian. Expelled from her childhood church, she affiliated with the Unitarian church.

=== Issues of divorce ===
Before her own marriage, Stone felt that women should be allowed to divorce drunken husbands, to formally end a "loveless marriage" so that "a true love may grow up in the soul of the injured one from the full enjoyment of which no legal bond had a right to keep her. Whatever is pure and holy, not only has a right to be, but it has a right, also, to be recognized, and further, I think it has no right not to be recognized." Stone's friends often felt differently about the issue; "Nettee" Brown wrote to Stone, in 1853, that she was not ready to accept the idea, even if both parties wanted divorce. Stanton was less inclined to clerical orthodoxy; she was very much in favor of giving women the right to divorce, eventually coming to the view that the reform of marriage laws was more important than women's voting rights.

In the process of planning for women's rights conventions, Stone worked against Stanton to remove the formal advocacy of divorce from any proposed platform. Stone wished to keep the subject separate, to prevent the appearance of moral laxity. She pushed "for the right of woman to the control of her own person as a moral, intelligent, accountable being." Other rights were certain to fall into place, after women were given control of their own bodies. Years later, Stone's position on divorce would change.

=== Differences with Douglass ===
In 1853, Stone drew large audiences with a lecture tour through several southern states. Former slave Frederick Douglass rebuked her in his abolitionist newspaper, accusing her of achieving success by putting her anti-slavery principles aside and speaking only of women's rights. Douglass, later, found Stone at fault for speaking at a whites-only Philadelphia lecture hall, but Stone insisted that she had replaced her planned speech that day with an appeal to the audience to boycott the facility. It took years before the two reconciled.

=== Western tour ===
On October 14, 1853, following the National Woman's Rights Convention held in Cleveland, Ohio, Stone and Lucretia Mott addressed Cincinnati's first women's rights meeting, arranged by Henry Blackwell, a local businessman from a family of capable women, who had taken an interest in Stone. After that successful meeting, Stone accepted Blackwell's offer to arrange a lecture tour for her in the western states – considered, then, to be those west of Pennsylvania and Virginia. Over the following thirteen weeks, Stone gave over forty lectures in thirteen cities, during which a report to the New York Tribune said she was stirring the West on women's rights "as it is seldom stirred on any subject, whatsoever." After four lectures in Louisville, Kentucky, Stone was begged to repeat the entire course and told she was having more effect there than she could have anywhere else. An Indianapolis newspaper reported that Stone "set about two-thirds of the women in the town crazy, after women's rights, and placed half the men in a similar predicament." St. Louis papers said her lectures attracted the largest crowds ever assembled there, filling the city's largest auditorium beyond its capacity of two thousand. Chicago papers praised her lectures as the best of the season and said they were inspiring discussion and debate in the city's homes and meeting places. When Stone headed home, in January 1854, she left behind incalculable influence.

From 1854 through 1858, Stone lectured on women's rights in Massachusetts, Maine, New Hampshire, Vermont, Connecticut, Rhode Island, New York, Pennsylvania, Delaware, New Jersey, Washington, D.C., Ohio, Indiana, Illinois, Michigan, Wisconsin and Ontario. Elizabeth Cady Stanton would later write that "Lucy Stone was the first speaker who really stirred the nation's heart on the subject of woman's wrongs."

== Petitioning and hearings ==
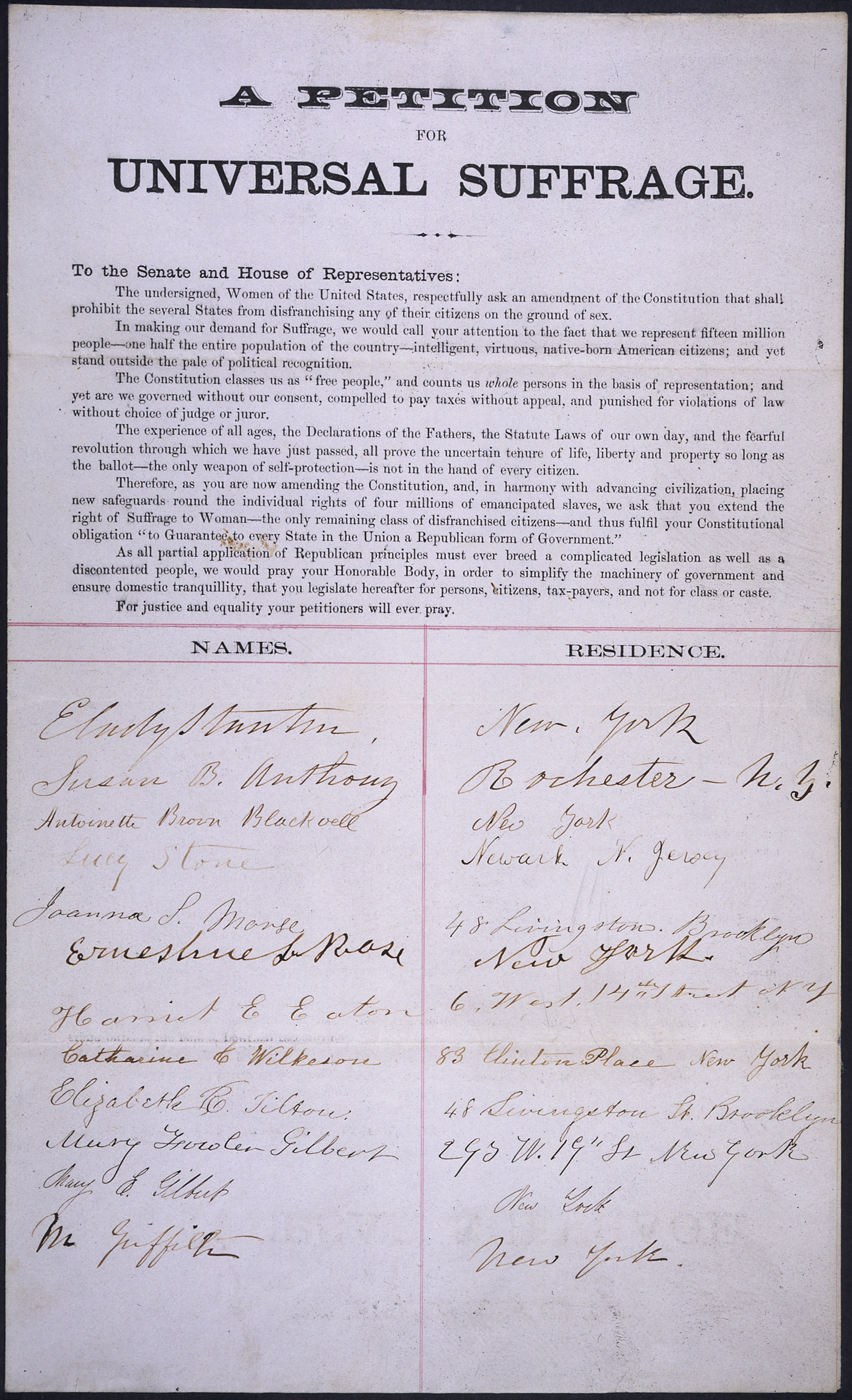
Petition signed by E. Cady Stanton, Susan B. Anthony, Lucy Stone, and others

In addition to being the women's rights movement's most prominent spokesperson, Lucy Stone led the movement's petitioning efforts. She initiated petition efforts in New England and several other states and assisted the petitioning efforts of state and local organizations in New York, Ohio, and Indiana.

=== Massachusetts ===
After petitioning the Massachusetts legislature from 1849 through 1852 for the right of women to vote and serve in public office, Stone aimed her 1853 petitions at the convention that would meet on May 4, 1853, to revise the state constitution. Wendell Phillips drafted both the petition, asking that the word "male" be stricken wherever it appeared in the constitution, and an appeal urging Massachusetts citizens to sign it. After canvassing the state for nine months, Stone sent the convention petitions bearing over five thousand signatures. On May 27, 1853, Stone and Phillips addressed the convention's Committee on Qualifications of Voters. In reporting Stone's hearing, the Liberator noted: "Never before, since the world was made, in any country, has woman publicly made her demand in the hall of legislation to be represented in her own person, and to have an equal part in framing the laws and determining the action of government."

=== Multi-state campaigns ===
Stone called a New England Woman's Rights Convention in Boston on June 2, 1854, to expand her petitioning efforts. The convention adopted her resolution for petitioning all six New England legislatures, as well as her proposed form of petition, and it appointed a committee, in each state, to organize the work. In a speech before the second New England Woman's Rights Convention, held in June 1855, Stone urged that one reason women needed suffrage was to protect any gains achieved, reminding them that "the next Legislature may undo all that the last have done for women." The convention adopted a resolution calling the ballot "woman's sword and shield; the means of achieving and protecting all other civil rights" and another urging the national convention to make suffrage petitioning its priority.

The next National Woman's Rights Convention met in Cincinnati on October 17 and 18, 1855. It was here that Stone delivered impromptu remarks that became famous as her "disappointment" speech. When a heckler interrupted the proceedings, calling female speakers "a few disappointed women,” Stone retorted that yes, she was, indeed, a "disappointed woman." She said, "In education, in marriage, in religion, in everything, disappointment is the lot of woman. It shall be the business of my life to deepen this disappointment in every woman's heart, until she bows down to it no longer." The convention adopted Stone's resolution calling for the circulation of petitions and saying it was "the duty of women in their respective States to ask the legislators for the elective franchise." Following the convention, suffrage petitioning took place in the New England states, New York, Ohio, Indiana, Illinois, Michigan, Wisconsin and Nebraska, with resultant legislative hearings or action in Nebraska and Wisconsin. Amelia Bloomer, recently moved to Iowa near the Nebraska border, took up the work in that area, while the Indiana Woman's Rights Society, at least one of whose officers was at the Cincinnati convention, directed the work in Indiana. Stone had helped launch the New York campaign at a state woman's rights convention in Saratoga Springs in August, and recruited workers for it at the Cleveland convention, as well as for the work in Illinois, Michigan and Ohio. Stone took charge of the work in Ohio, her new home state, drafting its petition, placing it in Ohio newspapers and circulating it during lectures across southern Ohio while her recruit worked in the northern part of the state. Stone also lectured in Illinois and Indiana in support of the petition drives there, and she personally introduced the work in Wisconsin, where she found volunteers to circulate the petition and legislators to introduce them in both houses of the legislature.

At the national convention of 1856, Stone presented a new strategy suggested by Antoinette Brown Blackwell to send a memorial to the various state legislatures signed by the officers of the National Woman's Rights Convention. Antoinette Brown had married Samuel Charles Blackwell on January 24, 1856, becoming Stone's sister-in-law in the process. Stone, Brown Blackwell, and Ernestine Rose were appointed a committee to carry out the plan. Stone drafted and printed the appeal, and Brown Blackwell mailed it to twenty-five state legislatures. Indiana and Pennsylvania referred the memorial to select committees, while both Massachusetts and Maine granted hearings. On March 6, 1857, Stone, Wendell Phillips and James Freeman Clarke addressed the Judiciary Committee of the Massachusetts senate, and on March 10, Stone and Phillips addressed a select committee of the Maine legislature.

On July 4, 1856, in Viroqua, Wisconsin, Stone gave the first women's rights and anti-slavery speech delivered by a woman in the area.

=== Tax protest ===
In January 1858, Stone staged a highly publicized protest that took the issue of taxation without representation across the nation. The previous summer she and Blackwell had purchased a house in Orange, New Jersey, and when the first tax bill came, Stone returned it unpaid with the explanation that taxing women while denying them the right to vote was a violation of America's founding principles. On January 22, 1858, the city auctioned some of her household goods to pay the tax and attendant court costs. The following month, Stone and Blackwell spoke on taxation without representation before two large meetings in Orange, and circulated petitions asking the New Jersey legislature for woman's suffrage. Stone's protest inspired other tax-paying women to action: some followed her example and refused to pay taxes, with one case reaching the Massachusetts Supreme Court in 1863, while others went to the polls to demand their right as taxpayers to vote.

== Marriage ==
Henry Blackwell began a two-year courtship of Stone in the summer of 1853. Stone told him she did not wish to marry because she did not want to surrender control over her life and would not assume the legal position occupied by a married woman. Blackwell maintained that despite the law, couples could create a marriage of equal partnership, governed by their mutual agreement. They could also take steps to protect the wife against unjust laws, such as placing her assets in the hands of a trustee. He also believed that marriage would allow each partner to accomplish more than he or she could alone. In order to show how he could help advance Stone's work, he arranged her highly successful western lecturing tour in 1853. Over an eighteen-month courtship conducted primarily through correspondence, Stone and Blackwell discussed the nature of marriage, actual and ideal, as well as their own natures and suitability for marriage. Stone gradually fell in love and in November 1854 agreed to marry Blackwell.

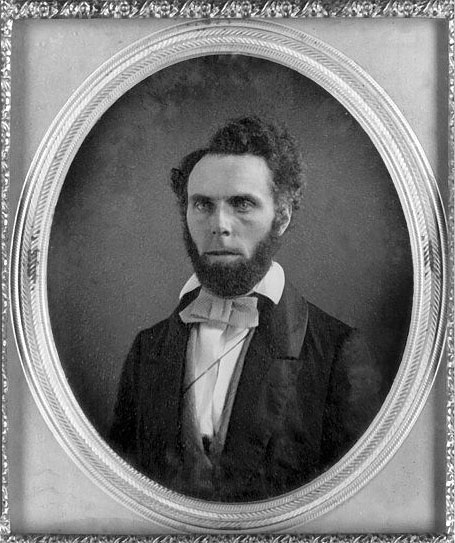
Henry Browne Blackwell

Stone and Blackwell developed a private agreement aimed at preserving and protecting Stone's financial independence and personal liberty. In monetary matters, they agreed that the marriage be like a business partnership, with the partners being "joint proprietors of everything except the results of previous labors." Neither would have claim to lands belonging to the other, nor any obligation for the other's costs of holding them. While married and living together they would share earnings, but if they should separate, they would relinquish claim to the other's subsequent earnings. Each would have the right to will their property to whomever they pleased unless they had children. Over Blackwell's objections, Stone refused to be supported and insisted on paying half of their mutual expenses. In addition to financial independence, Stone and Blackwell agreed that each would enjoy personal independence and autonomy: "Neither partner shall attempt to fix the residence, employment, or habits of the other, nor shall either partner feel bound to live together any longer than is agreeable to both." During their discussion of marriage, Stone had given Blackwell a copy of Henry C. Wright's book Marriage and Parentage; Or, The Reproductive Element in Man, as a Means to His Elevation and Happiness, and asked him to accept its principles as what she considered the relationship between husband and wife should be. Wright proposed that because women bore the results of sexual intercourse, wives should govern a couple's marital relations. In accordance with that view, Blackwell agreed that Stone would choose "when, where and how often" she would "become a mother." In addition to this private agreement, Blackwell drew up a protest of laws, rules, and customs that conferred superior rights on husbands and, as part of the wedding ceremony, pledged never to avail himself of those laws.

The wedding took place at Stone's home in West Brookfield, Massachusetts, on May 1, 1855, with Stone's close friend and co-worker Thomas Wentworth Higginson officiating. Higginson sent a copy of Stone and Blackwell's Protest to the Worcester Spy, and from there it spread across the country. While some commentators viewed it as a protest against marriage itself, others agreed that a woman should not resign her legal existence when she marries. It inspired other couples to make similar protests part of their wedding ceremonies.

=== Keeping her name ===
Stone viewed the tradition of wives abandoning their own surname to assume that of their husbands as a manifestation of the legal annihilation of a married woman's identity. Immediately after her marriage, with the agreement of her husband, she continued to sign correspondence as "Lucy Stone" or "Lucy Stone – only." But during the summer, Blackwell tried to register the deed for property Stone purchased in Wisconsin, and the registrar insisted she sign it as "Lucy Stone Blackwell." The couple consulted Blackwell's friend, Salmon P. Chase, a Cincinnati lawyer and future Chief Justice of the U.S. Supreme Court, who was not immediately able to answer their question about the legality of her name. So, while continuing to sign her name as Lucy Stone in private correspondence for eight months, she signed her name as Lucy Stone Blackwell on public documents, and she allowed herself to be so identified in convention proceedings and newspaper reports. But upon receiving assurance from Chase that no law required a married woman to change her name, Stone made a public announcement at the May 7, 1856, convention of the American Anti-Slavery Society in Boston that her name remained Lucy Stone. In 1879, when Boston women were granted the franchise in school elections, Stone registered to vote. But officials notified her that she would not be allowed to vote unless she added "Blackwell" to her signature. She refused to do so, and therefore was not able to vote. Because her time and energy were consumed with suffrage work, she did not challenge the action in a court of law.

=== Children ===
Stone and Blackwell had one daughter, Alice Stone Blackwell, born September 14, 1857, who became a leader of the suffrage movement and wrote the first biography of her mother, Lucy Stone: Pioneer Woman Suffragist. In 1859, while the family was living temporarily in Chicago, Stone miscarried and lost a baby boy.

== Waning activism ==
After her marriage, from the summer of 1855 until the summer of 1857, Stone continued a full lecturing, petitioning, and organizing schedule.

In January 1856, Stone was a defense witness in the case of Margaret Garner, a slave of the Gaines family in Kentucky, who had escaped with her husband and children across the frozen Ohio River into the free state of Ohio. When slave catchers and U.S. Marshals surrounded her cousin's house where the fugitives hid, Garner reportedly declared she would kill each of her children before allowing them to be taken back to Kentucky. Garner's defense attorney wanted to test rights Garner might have under the Fugitive Slave Act of 1850, which her owner had used to track her into the free state. However, by legal rules of the day, Garner could not testify, so, Stone testified on her behalf about Garner's sexual exploitation by her new master. She additionally testified to rebut a rumor put forward by the prosecution that Stone gave Garner the lethal weapon so that Garner could kill herself if she was forced to return to slavery. Stone was referred to by the court as "Mrs. Lucy Stone Blackwell" and was asked if she wanted to defend herself; she preferred to address the assembly off the record after adjournment, saying "...With my own teeth, I would tear open my veins and let the earth drink my blood, rather than wear the chains of slavery. How, then, could I blame her for wishing her child to find freedom with God and the angels, where no chains are?" The Ohio court did not decide the case by referring to the Fugitive Slave Act, but instead, it returned Garner and her family to Gaines, who returned to Kentucky before any legal decision was issued. This led to outrage among Ohio abolitionists. Garner's surviving daughter died during the family's steamboat journey south, and Garner was sold in New Orleans and died in bondage of typhoid fever in Mississippi.

The birth of her daughter in September 1857, however, began to reduce the level of Stone's activism. Stone had made preliminary arrangements for the 1857 national convention to be held in Providence, but because she would not be able to attend it, she handed responsibility to Susan B. Anthony and Thomas Wentworth Higginson. When the Panic of 1857 disrupted Anthony's plan to move the convention to Chicago, Stone made the announcement that the next National Woman's Rights Convention would be in May 1858. Anthony helped Stone arrange the 1858 convention and then took sole responsibility for the 1859 meeting. Elizabeth Cady Stanton took charge of the 1860 convention.

Stone hired a nursemaid to help care for her daughter, who was in poor health for several years, but she did not trust her ability to provide proper care when Stone was absent. Stone eventually withdrew from most public work to stay at home with her child. She resigned from the Central Committee, which organized the annual women's rights conventions. She began to suffer from self-doubt and a lack of drive, in addition to the debilitating headaches that had plagued her for years. She made only two public appearances during the Civil War (1861–1865): to attend the founding convention of the Women's Loyal National League and the celebration of the thirtieth anniversary of the American Anti-Slavery Society, both in 1863. Stone began to increase her reform activities back to a normal level, after the Civil War had ended.

As a lifelong believer in nonresistance, Stone could not support the war effort as so many of her friends did. She could support the drive to end slavery, however, which the war had made into a realistic possibility. In 1863, Elizabeth Cady Stanton and Susan B. Anthony organized the Women's Loyal National League, the first national women's political organization in the U.S. It collected nearly 400,000 signatures on petitions to abolish slavery in the largest petition drive in the nation's history up to that time. Despite her reduced public activity, Stone agreed to preside over the League's founding convention, and later, she agreed to manage its office for two weeks to give Anthony a badly needed break. She declined, however, to go on lecture tours for the League.

For years, Henry Blackwell had worked with real estate investments. In 1864, amid wartime inflation, his investments began to pay off handsomely. Stone was enormously relieved to have the family freed from the debts that had been contracted to buy investment property. This major improvement in the family's finances enabled Blackwell to scale back his business efforts and devote more of his time to social reform activities.

Beginning to ease back into public activity, Stone embarked on a lecture tour on women's rights in New York and New England in the autumn of 1865. She was still experiencing periods of self-doubt a year later, but, with Blackwell's encouragement, she traveled with him on a joint lecture tour in 1866.

== National organizations ==
=== American Equal Rights Association ===
Slavery was abolished in December 1865 with the ratification of the Thirteenth Amendment to the U.S. Constitution, which raised questions about the future role of the American Anti-Slavery Society (AASS). In January 1866, Stone and Anthony traveled to an AASS meeting in Boston to propose a merger of the anti-slavery and women's movements into one that would campaign for equal rights for all citizens. The AASS, preferring to focus on the rights of African Americans, especially the newly freed slaves, rejected their proposal.

In May 1866, Anthony and Stanton organized the Eleventh National Women's Rights Convention, the first since before the Civil War began. In a move similar to the proposal that had been made earlier to anti-slavery forces, the convention voted to transform itself into a new organization called the American Equal Rights Association (AERA), whose purpose was to campaign for the equal rights for all, especially the right of suffrage. Stone did not attend the AERA's founding convention, most likely for fear of the recent cholera outbreak in New York City, the meeting's location. She was, nevertheless, elected to the new organization's executive committee. Blackwell was elected as the AERA's recording secretary.

In 1867, Stone and Blackwell opened the AERA's difficult campaign in Kansas in support of referendums in that state that would enfranchise both African Americans and women. They led the effort for three months, before turning the work over to others and returning home. Neither of the Kansas referendums was approved by the voters. Disagreements over tactics used during the Kansas campaign contributed to a growing split in the women's movement, which was formalized after the AERA convention in 1869.

=== Split within the women's movement ===
The immediate cause of the split was the proposed Fifteenth Amendment, which would prohibit the denial of suffrage because of race. In one of their most controversial moves, Anthony and Stanton campaigned against the amendment, insisting that women and African Americans should be enfranchised at the same time. They said that by effectively enfranchising all men while excluding all women, the amendment would create an "aristocracy of sex" by giving constitutional authority to the idea that men were superior to women.

Stone supported the amendment. She had expected, however, that progressive forces would push for the enfranchisement of African Americans and women at the same time and was distressed when they did not. In 1867, she wrote to Abby Kelley Foster to protest the plan to enfranchise black men first. "O Abby", she wrote, "it is a terrible mistake you are all making... There is no other name given by which this country can be saved, but that of woman." In a dramatic debate with Frederick Douglass at the AERA convention in 1869, Stone argued that suffrage for women was more important than suffrage for African Americans. She, nevertheless, supported the amendment, saying, "But I thank God for that XV. Amendment, and I hope that it will be adopted in every State. I will be thankful, in my soul, if any body can get out of the terrible pit. But I believe that the safety of the government would be more promoted by the admission of woman as an element of restoration and harmony than the negro." Stone and her allies expected that their active support for the amendment to enfranchise black men would lead their abolitionist friends in Congress to push for an amendment to enfranchise women as the next step, but that did not happen.

Blackwell, who would be an important figure in the suffrage movement in the coming years, also supported the amendment. His special interest which he pursued for decades, however, was in convincing southern politicians that the enfranchisement of women would help to ensure white supremacy in their region. In 1867, he published an open letter to southern legislatures, assuring them that if both blacks and women were enfranchised, "the political supremacy of your white race will remain unchanged" and "the black race would gravitate, by the law of nature, toward the tropics." Stone's reaction to this idea is unknown.

The AERA essentially collapsed after its acrimonious convention in May 1869, and two competing woman suffrage organizations were created in its aftermath. Two days after the convention, Anthony, Stanton and their allies formed the National Woman Suffrage Association (NWSA). In November 1869, Lucy Stone, Julia Ward Howe, and their allies formed the competing American Woman Suffrage Association (AWSA). The AWSA initially was the larger of the two organizations, but it declined in strength during the 1880s.

Even after the Fifteenth Amendment was ratified in 1870, differences between the two organizations remained. The AWSA worked almost exclusively for women's suffrage, while the NWSA initially worked on a wide range of issues, including divorce reform and equal pay for women. The AWSA included both men and women, among its leadership, while the NWSA was led by women. The AWSA worked for suffrage, mostly, at the state level, while the NWSA worked more at the national level. The AWSA cultivated an image of respectability, while the NWSA sometimes used confrontational tactics.

=== Divorce and "free love" ===
In 1870, at the twentieth anniversary celebration of the first National Women's Rights Convention in Worcester, Massachusetts, Stanton spoke for three hours, rallying the crowd for women's right to divorce. By then, Stone's position on the matter had shifted significantly. Personal differences between Stone and Stanton came to the fore on the issue, with Stone writing "We believe in marriage for life, and deprecate all this loose, pestiferous talk in favor of easy divorce." Stone made it clear that those wishing for "free divorce" were not associated with Stone's organization AWSA, which was headed at that time by Henry Ward Beecher. Stone wrote against 'free love:' "Be not deceived—free love means free lust."

This editorial position would come back to haunt Stone. Also in 1870, Elizabeth Roberts Tilton told her husband Theodore Tilton that she had been carrying on an adulterous relation with his good friend Beecher. Theodore Tilton published an editorial saying that Beecher "has, at a most unseemly time of life, been detected in improper intimacies with certain ladies of his congregation." Tilton also informed Stanton about the alleged affair, and Stanton passed the information to Victoria Woodhull. Woodhull, a free love advocate, printed innuendo about Beecher, and began to woo Tilton, convincing him to write a book of her life story from imaginative material that she supplied. In 1871, Stone wrote to a friend "my one wish, in regard to Mrs. Woodhull, is that [neither] she, nor her ideas, may be so much as heard of at our meeting." Woodhull's self-serving activities were attracting disapproval from both centrist AWSA and radical NWSA. To divert criticism from herself, Woodhull published a denunciation of Beecher in 1872, saying that he practiced free love in private while speaking out against it from the pulpit. This caused a sensation in the press and resulted in an inconclusive legal suit and a subsequent formal inquiry lasting well into 1875. The furor over adultery and the friction between various camps of women's rights activists took focus away from legitimate political aims. Henry Blackwell wrote to Stone from Michigan, where he was working toward putting woman suffrage into the state constitution, saying "This Beecher-Tilton affair is playing the deuce with [woman suffrage] in Michigan. No chance of success, this year, I fancy."

== Voting rights ==
In 1870, Stone and Blackwell moved from New Jersey to Dorchester, Massachusetts, which is a neighborhood of Boston just south of downtown as of 2026. There, they purchased Pope's Hill, a seventeen-room house with extensive grounds and several outbuildings. Many of the town's women had been active in the Dorchester Female Anti-Slavery Society, and, by 1870, a number of local women were suffragists.

=== New England Woman Suffrage Association ===
At her new home, Stone worked closely with the New England Woman Suffrage Association (NEWSA), the first major political organization in the U.S. with women's suffrage as its goal. Two years earlier, she had traveled to Boston to participate in its founding convention and had been elected to its executive committee. In 1877, she became its president, and served in that position until her death in 1893.

=== Woman's Journal ===
In 1870, Stone and Blackwell founded the Woman's Journal, an eight-page weekly newspaper based in Boston. Originally intended primarily to voice the concerns of the NEWSA and the AWSA, by the 1880s, it had become an unofficial voice of the suffrage movement as a whole. Stone edited the journal for the rest of her life, assisted by her husband and their daughter, Alice Stone Blackwell. Stone did not collect a salary for her work on the paper, which required continual financial support. One of her greatest challenges was raising money to keep it going. Its circulation reached a peak of 6,000, although in 1878, it was 2,000 less than it had been two years earlier.

After the AWSA and NWSA merged to form the National American Woman Suffrage Association (NAWSA) in 1890, the Woman's Journal became its official voice and eventually the basis for a newspaper with a much wider circulation. In 1917, at a time when victory for women's suffrage was coming closer, Carrie Chapman Catt, leader of the NAWSA, said, "There can be no overestimating the value to the suffrage cause of the Woman's Journal... The suffrage success of today is not conceivable, without the Woman's Journal's part in it.

=== "The Colorado Lesson" ===
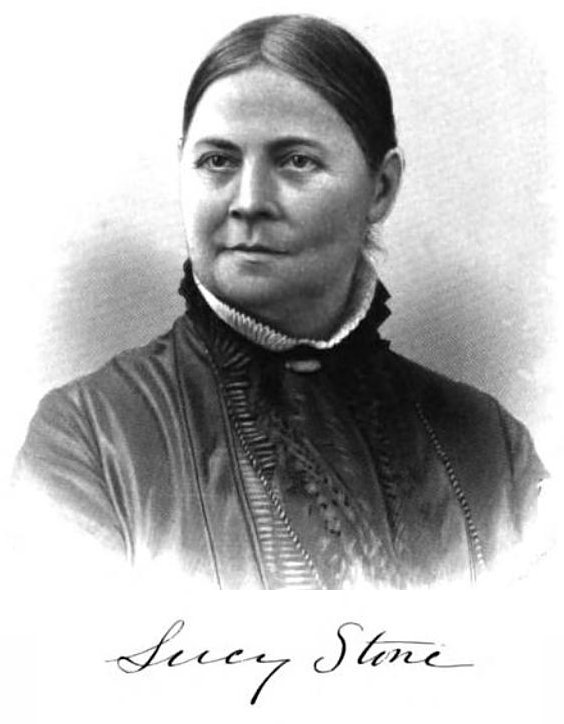
Lucy Stone's portrait as it appeared in History of Woman Suffrage, Volume II, in 1881

In 1877, Stone was asked by Rachel Foster Avery to assist Colorado activists in the organization of a popular referendum campaign, with the aim of gaining suffrage for Coloradan women. Together, Stone and Blackwell worked the northern half of the state in late summer, while Susan Anthony traveled the less-promising rough-and-tumble southern half. Patchwork and scattered support was reported by activists, with some areas more receptive. Latino voters proved largely uninterested in voting reform; some of that resistance was blamed on the extreme opposition to the measure voiced by the Roman Catholic bishop of Colorado. All but a handful of politicians in Colorado ignored the measure or actively fought it. Stone concentrated on convincing Denver voters during the October ballot, but the measure lost heavily, with 68% voting against it. Married working men showed the greatest support, and young single men the least. Blackwell called it "The Colorado Lesson,” writing that "Woman suffrage can never be carried by a popular vote, without a political party behind it."

=== School board vote ===
In 1879, after Stone organized a petition by suffragists across the state, Massachusetts women were given strictly delimited voting rights: a woman who could prove the same qualifications as a male voter was allowed to cast her vote for members of the school board. Lucy Stone applied to the voting board in Boston but was required to sign her husband's surname as her own. She refused and never participated in that vote.

== Reconciliation ==
In 1887, eighteen years after the rift formed in the American women's rights movement, Stone proposed a merger of the two groups. Plans were drawn up, and, at their annual meetings, propositions were heard and voted on, then passed to the other group for evaluation. By 1890, the organizations resolved their differences and merged to form the National American Woman Suffrage Association (NAWSA). Stone was too weak with heart problems and respiratory illness to attend its first convention, but was elected chair of the executive committee. Stanton was president of the new organization, but Anthony, who had the title of vice president, was its leader in practice.

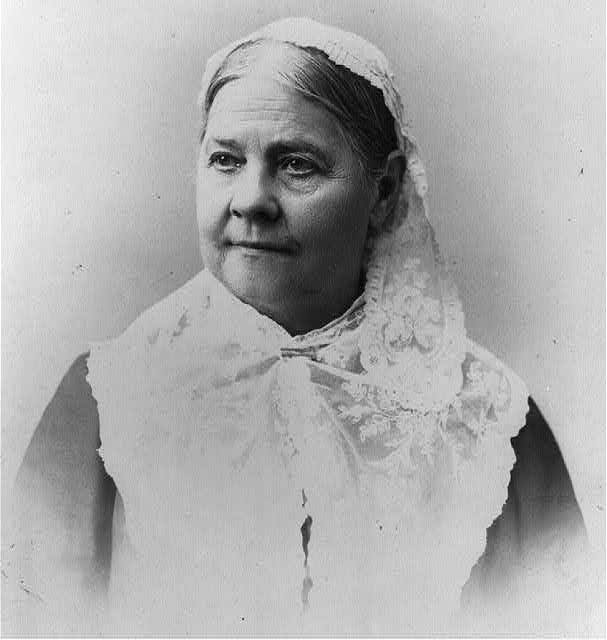
Lucy Stone in old age

Starting early in January 1891, Carrie Chapman Catt visited Stone repeatedly at Pope's Hill for the purpose of learning from Stone about the ways of political organizing. Stone had previously met Catt at an Iowa state woman's suffrage convention in October 1889 and had been impressed at her ambition and sense of presence, saying "Mrs. Chapman will be heard from yet, in this movement." Stone mentored Catt for the rest of that winter, giving her a wealth of information about lobbying techniques and fundraising. Catt later used the teaching in order to lead the final drive to gain women the vote in 1920.

Catt, Stone, and Blackwell went together to the January 1892 NAWSA convention in Washington, DC. Along with Isabella Beecher Hooker, Stone, Stanton, and Anthony, the "triumvirate" of women's suffrage, were called away from the convention's opening hours by an unexpected woman suffrage hearing before the United States House Committee on the Judiciary. Stone told the assembled congressmen "I come before this committee with the sense which I always feel, that we are handicapped, as women, in what we try to do for ourselves by the single fact that we have no vote. This cheapens us. You do not care so much for us, as if we had votes." Stone argued that men should work to pass laws for equality in property rights between the sexes. Stone demanded an eradication of coverture, the folding of a wife's property into that of her husband. Stone's impromptu speech was preceded by a speech by Stanton. Stone later published Stanton's speech in its entirety in the Woman's Journal as "Solitude of Self". Back at the NAWSA convention, Anthony was elected president, with Stanton and Stone becoming honorary presidents.

== Final appearance ==
In 1892, Stone was convinced to sit for a portrait in sculpture rendered by Anne Whitney, a sculptor and poet. Stone had previously protested the proposed portrait for more than a year, saying that the funds to engage an artist would be better spent on suffrage work. Stone finally yielded to pressure from Frances Willard, the New England Women's Club and some of her friends and neighbors in the Boston area, and sat while Whitney produced a bust. In February 1893, Stone invited her brother Frank and his wife Sarah to come see the bust before it was shipped to Chicago for display at the upcoming World's Columbian Exposition.

Stone went with her daughter to Chicago in May 1893 and gave her last public speeches at the World's Congress of Representative Women, where she saw a strong international involvement in women's congresses, with almost 500 women from 27 countries speaking at 81 meetings, and attendance topping 150,000 at the week-long event. Stone's immediate focus was on state referendums under consideration in New York and Nebraska. Stone presented a speech she had prepared entitled "The Progress of Fifty Years" wherein she described the milestones of change, and said "I think, with never-ending gratitude, that the young women of today do not and can never know at what price their right to free speech and to speak at all in public has been earned." Stone met with Catt and Abigail Scott Duniway to form a plan for organizing in Colorado, and Stone attended two days of meetings about getting a woman suffrage drive restarted in Kansas. Stone and her daughter returned home to Pope's Hill on May 28.

Those who knew Stone well thought her voice was lacking strength. In August, when she and her husband wanted to take part in more meetings at the Exposition, she was too weak to go. Stone was diagnosed as suffering from advanced stomach cancer in September. She wrote final letters to friends and relatives. Having "prepared for death with serenity and an unwavering concern for the women's cause", Lucy Stone died on October 18, 1893, at the age of 75. At her funeral three days later, 1,100 people crowded the church, and hundreds more stood silently outside. Six women and six men served as pallbearers, including sculptor Anne Whitney, and Stone's old abolitionist friends Thomas Wentworth Higginson and Samuel Joseph May. Mourners lined the streets for a sight of the funeral procession, and front-page banner headlines ran in news accounts. Stone's death was the most widely reported of any American woman's up to that time.

According to her wishes, her body was cremated, making her the first person cremated in Massachusetts, though a wait of over two months was undertaken while the crematorium at Forest Hills Cemetery could be completed. Stone's remains are interred at Forest Hills; a chapel there is named after her.

== Legacy ==
Stone's portrait was used in Boston on a political button between 1900 and 1920.

Lucy Stone's refusal to take her husband's name as an assertion of her own rights was controversial at the time, and it is largely what she is remembered for today. Women who continue to use their maiden name after marriage are still occasionally known as "Lucy Stoners" in the United States. In 1921, the Lucy Stone League was founded in New York City by Ruth Hale, described in 1924 by Time as the "'Lucy Stone'–spouse" of Heywood Broun. The League was re-instituted in 1997.

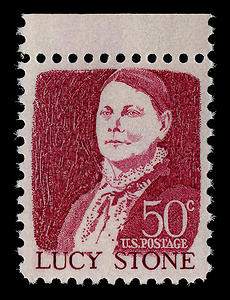
50-cent United States Postal Service stamp honoring Stone

In 1876, Susan B. Anthony, Elizabeth Cady Stanton, Matilda Joslyn Gage, and Ida Husted Harper began to write the History of Woman Suffrage. They planned to write one volume but finished four before the death of Anthony in 1906, and they completed two more afterward. The first three volumes chronicled the beginnings of the women's rights movement, including the years that Stone was active. Because of differences between Stone and Stanton that had been highlighted in the schism between NWSA and AWSA, Stone's place in history was marginalized in the work. The text was used as the standard scholarly resource on 19th-century U.S. feminism for much of the 20th century, causing Stone's extensive contribution to be overlooked in many histories of women's causes.

On August 13, 1968, the 150th anniversary of her birth, the U.S. Postal Service honored Stone with a 50-cent postage stamp in the Prominent Americans series. The image was adapted from a photograph included in Alice Stone Blackwell's biography of Stone.

In 1986, Stone was inducted into the National Women's Hall of Fame.

In 1999, a series of six tall marble panels with a bronze bust in each was added to the Massachusetts State House; the busts are of Stone, Florence Luscomb, Mary Kenney O'Sullivan, Josephine St. Pierre Ruffin, Sarah Parker Remond, and Dorothea Dix. Two quotations from each woman are etched on their marble panel, and the wall behind the panels has wallpaper depicting six government documents related to a cause of one or more of the women.

In 2000, Amy Ray of the Indigo Girls included a song entitled Lucystoners on her first solo recording, Stag.

An administration and classroom building on Livingston Campus at Rutgers University in New Jersey is named for Lucy Stone. Warren, Massachusetts, contains a park named for her along the Quaboag River. Anne Whitney's 1893 bust of Lucy Stone is on display in Boston's Faneuil Hall.

She is featured on the Boston Women's Heritage Trail.

On September 19, 2016, the U.S. Secretary of the Navy Ray Mabus announced the name of the fifth ship of a six-unit construction contract as USNS Lucy Stone (T-AO 209). This ship is part of the John Lewis class of fleet replenishment oilers, each named in honor of a U.S. civil and human rights activist, currently under construction at General Dynamics NASSCO in San Diego, California.

== Home ==
Stone's birthplace, the Lucy Stone Home Site, is owned and managed by The Trustees of Reservations, a non-profit land conservation and historic preservation organization dedicated to preserving natural and historic places in the Commonwealth of Massachusetts. The site includes 61 acres of forested land on the side of Coys Hill in West Brookfield, Massachusetts. Although the farmhouse in which Stone was born and married burned to the ground in 1950, its ruins are at the center of the property. At the time of Stone's wedding, both her parents and a married brother and his family lived in the two-and-one-half-story house, and family descendants continued to live there until 1936. In 1915, a pilgrimage of suffragists placed a memorial tablet on the house, which read: "This house was the birthplace of Lucy Stone, pioneer advocate of equal rights for women. Born August 13, 1818. Married May 1, 1855, died October 18, 1893. In grateful memory Massachusetts suffragists placed this tablet August 13, 1915." That tablet, which was severely damaged but survived the 1950 fire, is now in the Quaboag Historical Society Museum. After the fire, the surrounding farmland was abandoned and left to revert to forest, and it is now used for hunting and harvesting timber. The Trustees acquired the home site in 2002 and have been maintaining the property ever since.

== See also ==
- First-wave feminism
- History of feminism
- List of civil rights leaders
- List of suffragists and suffragettes
- Lucy Stone League
- Timeline of women's suffrage
- Women's suffrage organizations
- Women's suffrage in the United States
