= Sarah Ellen Blackwell =

American author and artist (1828–1901)

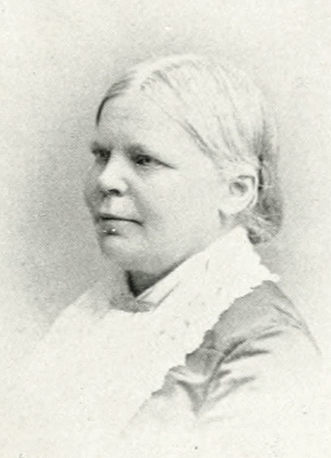
Photo of Sarah Ellen Blackwell, ca. 1893

Sarah Ellen Blackwell (1828–1901) was an American author, biographer, and artist.

== Early years and education ==
Sarah Ellen Blackwell was the youngest daughter of Hannah (Lane) Blackwell and Samuel Blackwell, a sugar refiner and lay preacher. She was born in Bristol, England, and her family emigrated to the United States four years later, eventually settling in Cincinnati, Ohio. Her father died when she was a child, and she was educated in part by her older sisters, the physicians Elizabeth Blackwell and Emily Blackwell. Other siblings included the abolitionist Samuel Charles Blackwell, the social reformer Henry Browne Blackwell, and the writer, Anna Blackwell.

Blackwell was interested in the arts, and around 1850 she began studying art at the newly opened Philadelphia School of Design for Women; she also took classes in New York. In 1855, she went to Europe to continue her training, studying design in Paris before moving on to study painting in London with John Ruskin. She funded her trip in part by writing weekly letters for two Philadelphia newspapers, an opportunity that opened up after one of her stories won a prize in a magazine contest.

== Career ==
On her return to New York after four years in Europe, she opened a studio and began teaching painting and drawing. She eventually closed this studio in order to work with her physician sisters, though she continued to write for magazines and newspapers. She published a series of letters about Anna Ella Carroll, whose role as an adviser to President Lincoln's cabinet during the American Civil War was being much discussed at the time by feminists. In 1891, she published the first full-length biography of Carroll, the well-researched but partisan A Military Genius: Life of Anna Ella Carroll. More recent biographies and analyses generally take a more moderate view of Carroll's accomplishments than Blackwell did.

Blackwell was active in the anti-vivisection movement.

She died in 1901, and many of her letters are held among the Blackwell family papers at Radcliffe College's Schlesinger Library.

== Family ==
Blackwell raised three adopted children on her own — Cornelia, Paul, and Susie — and often looked after Anna, Emily's adopted daughter.
