= American Woman Suffrage Association =

19th-century political organization

- Abbreviation: AWSA
- Successor: National American Woman Suffrage Association (NAWSA)
- Formation: 1869
- Dissolved: 1890
- Key people: Lucy Stone, Frances Ellen Watkins Harper, Henry Brown Blackwell, Julia Ward Howe, Mary Livermore, Josephine Ruffin, Henry Ward Beecher

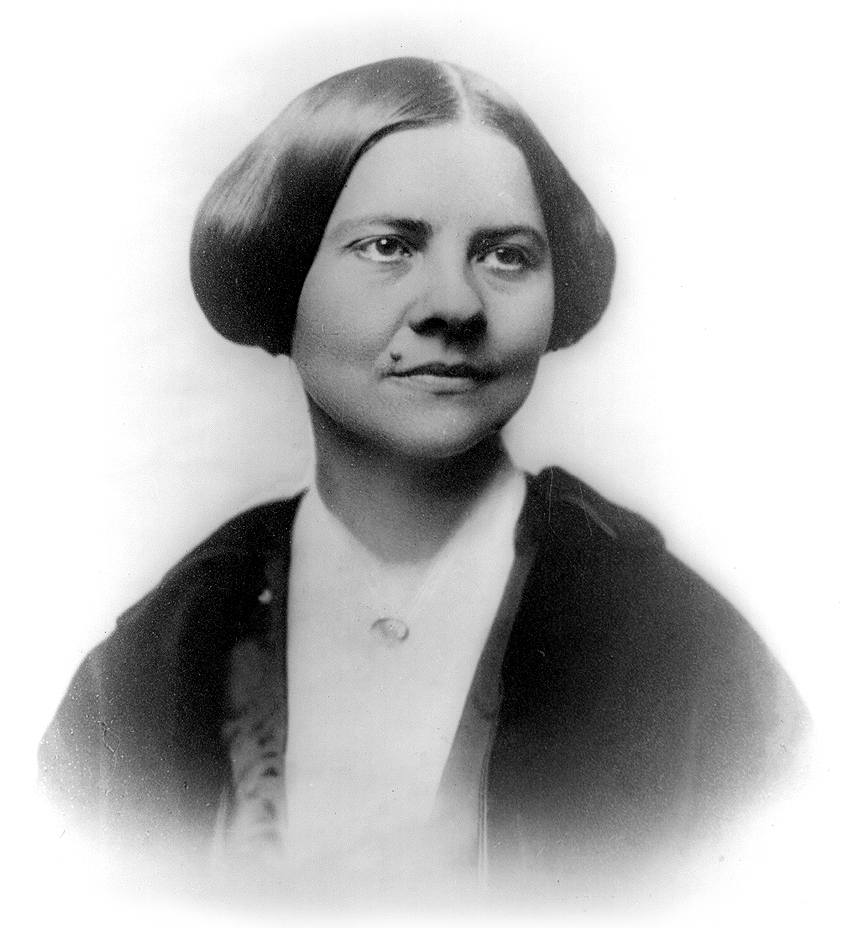
Lucy Stone, the founder of the American Woman's Suffrage Association

The American Woman Suffrage Association (AWSA) was a single-issue national organization formed in 1869 to work for women's suffrage in the United States. The AWSA lobbied state governments to enact laws granting or expanding women's right to vote in the United States. Lucy Stone, its most prominent leader, began publishing a newspaper in 1870 called the Woman's Journal. It was designed as the voice of the AWSA, and it eventually became a voice of the women's movement as a whole.

In 1890, the AWSA merged with a rival organization, the National Woman Suffrage Association (NWSA). The new organization, called the National American Woman Suffrage Association, was initially led by Susan B. Anthony and Elizabeth Cady Stanton, who had been the leaders of the NWSA.

== Origins ==
Following the Civil War, in 1866, leaders of the abolition and suffrage movements founded the American Equal Rights Association (AERA) to advocate for citizens' right to vote regardless of race or sex. Divisions among the group's members, which had existed from the outset, became apparent during the struggle over the ratification of two amendments to the United States Constitution. The proposed Fourteenth Amendment, which guaranteed equal protection of the laws to all citizens, regardless of race, color, creed, or previous condition of servitude, added the word "male" to the Constitution for the first time. The proposed Fifteenth Amendment extended franchise to African American men, but not to women. Following its contentious convention in May 1869, the AERA effectively dissolved. In its aftermath, two rival organizations were formed to campaign for women's suffrage. The National Woman Suffrage Association (NWSA) was formed at a hastily organized meeting two days after the last AERA convention. Preparations for the formation of the rival American Woman Suffrage Association (AWSA) began soon afterward.

The AWSA was founded in November 1869 at a convention in Cleveland following the issuance of a call signed by more than 100 people from 25 states. It was organized by leaders of the New England Woman Suffrage Association (NEWSA), which had been created in November 1868 as part of the developing split within the women's movement. The AWSA and the NEWSA operated separately with somewhat overlapping leadership.

Wanting to differentiate themselves from NWSA leaders who had expressed hostility to male political influence, the AWSA founders made a point of inviting prominent male abolitionists and Republican politicians to sign the call to its founding convention. The first slate of officers consisted of equal numbers of men and women, and the convention agreed to alternate the presidency of the organization between a woman and a man. Henry Ward Beecher was the first president of the AWSA, and Lucy Stone was chair of the executive committee. Its headquarters were in Boston.

African Americans attended the AWSA's founding convention and played important roles in the organization. Robert Purvis was elected vice president for Pennsylvania at that convention. Frances Ellen Watkins Harper, also a founding member of the AWSA, gave the closing address at the annual conventions in 1873 and 1875.

Suffrage activists who hoped to prevent a split in the movement convinced Susan B. Anthony, one of the leaders of the NWSA, to attend the AWSA's founding convention. She was given a seat on the platform where she heard speeches voicing a determination to replace the NWSA. She rose to speak immediately after Lucy Stone's speech, offering to cooperate with the AWSA and saying the movement was more important than any one organization. The split, however, continued for many years.

NWSA, led by Elizabeth Cady Stanton and Susan B. Anthony, condemned the Fifteenth Amendment as an injustice to women. In her The Revolution newsletter, Stanton periodically appealed to racism and ethnocentrism in order to distinguish female suffrage from black male suffrage: “ 'Patrick and Sambo and Hans and Yung Tung, who do not know the difference between a monarchy and a republic,' declared Stanton, had no right to be “making laws for [feminist leader] Lucretia Mott.” ' The AWSA, which included Lucy Stone, Frances Ellen Watkins Harper, Henry Blackwell, Julia Ward Howe and Josephine Ruffin, strongly supported the Republican Party and the Fifteenth Amendment, which they felt would not win congressional approval if it included the vote for women. Another member was abolitionist and women's rights advocate Sojourner Truth.

In 1870, Lucy Stone, the leader of the AWSA, began publishing an eight-page weekly newspaper called the Woman's Journal as the voice of the AWSA. Eventually it became a voice of the women's movement as a whole.

== Formation of the National American Woman Suffrage Association ==
The AWSA was initially larger than the NWSA, but it declined in strength during the 1880s. Stanton and Anthony, the leading figures in the NWSA, were more widely known as leaders of the women's suffrage movement during this period and more influential in setting its direction.

During the 1880s, it became increasingly clear that group rivalries were counterproductive to the goal of votes for women. Conversations about a merger between the AWSA and NWSA began in 1886. After several years of negotiations, the organizations officially joined in 1890 to form the National American Woman Suffrage Association (NAWSA). The leaders of this new organization included Elizabeth Cady Stanton, Susan B. Anthony, Carrie Chapman Catt, Frances Willard, Mary Church Terrell, Matilda Joslyn Gage and Anna Howard Shaw. Stanton served in a largely ceremonial capacity as the NAWSA's first president while Anthony was its leading force in practice. The suffrage movement distanced itself from labor groups and kept its focus on the more affluent levels of society.

The first three volumes of the six-volume History of Woman Suffrage were written by the leaders of the NWSA prior to the merger. It included a 107-page chapter on the history of the AWSA, the NWSA's bitter rival, but provided much more information about the NWSA itself that was written from its own point of view. This unbalanced portrayal of the movement influenced scholarly research in this field for many years. Not until about the middle of the 20th century did the AWSA begin to receive adequate scholarly attention.

== Lucy Stone ==
Lucy Stone was born on August 13, 1818 in West Brookfield Massachusetts. She began her career as a teacher in order to save enough money to pay for her college education, eventually at the age of 25 she had earned enough to begin school at Oberlin, which was the only college that would admit women during the early 1800s.

Stone gave her first public speech at Oberlin, but received a great amount of backlash from the Ladies Board, calling her actions "unwomanly" and "unscriptural." Stone graduated from Oberlin in 1847, and gave her first woman's right lecture the same year. Stone's early work consisted of a mix between woman's rights and anti-slavery lectures, but eventually resigned from the Anti-Slavery Society in order to devote herself to the fight for woman's rights.

Stone began her fight for suffrage alone, as no suffrage associations had been established at the time, she received a great deal of backlash from the public, still she continued to travel across the United States to give her lectures, and was greeted with a large audience at almost every lecture. She managed to have control over her crowds and they began to respect her efforts even if they didn't necessarily agree with her. Stone married Henry Blackwell in 1855 who felt strongly about woman's rights and was an abolitionist. Stone never changed her name throughout the 40 years they were happily married. The two of them lectured together and took part in a multitude of campaigns where suffrage amendments had been submitted for the popular vote.

In 1866 Stone helped organize The Equal Rights Association which advocated from equal rights among African Americans and women. She then went on to organize the American Woman's Suffrage Association, sitting as chairman for its executive branch for almost twenty years. Then with the money she earned through her work she funded the Woman's Journal in 1870, working on it with her husband to give woman a space to advocate for themselves, the journal was passed down to her daughter and continued to thrive as a space of change for women across the United States of America.

== Comparison to NWSA ==
After Reconstruction, the AWSA began to differ from the NWSA in several other ways:

- The AWSA included both men and women. The NWSA was all-female.
- The AWSA chose not campaign on other issues related to gender equality, focusing its efforts on suffrage. The NWSA also took positions on a number of other women's rights issues, including improved property rights for married women and laws that would make it easier for married women to obtain a divorce.
- The AWSA believed success could be more easily achieved through state-by-state campaigns. As a part of this strategy, the group adopted a federated structure, establishing state and local chapters throughout the nation, and particularly in the East and Midwest. The early NWSA advocated for securing woman suffrage through a federal constitutional amendment, although its work also moved to the state level during the 1880s.
- The AWSA supported traditional social institutions, such as marriage and religion. The NWSA criticized aspects of these institutions that they felt were unjust to women.
- The AWSA employed less militant lobbying tactics, such as petition drives, testifying before legislatures, and giving public speeches. The NWSA used litigation and other confrontational tactics.

The author of a study of African American women in the suffrage movement lists nine who participated in the AWSA during the 1870s and six who participated in the NWSA. Elizabeth Cady Stanton and additional NWSA members employed racism in order to distinguish female suffrage from black male suffrage. In contrast, Lucy Stone and AWSA members countenanced the absence of a female suffrage clause in the Fifteenth Amendment, while arguing that suffrage for women would be more beneficial to the country than suffrage for black men.

== Policy victories ==
Several modest but significant gains for women suffrage occurred during the twenty-year period of AWSA activity. Women in two Western states, Wyoming and Utah, won the right to vote. The AWSA used their state to state campaigning tactic across these western states in order to gain support for woman's suffrage. This allowed the campaign to gain traction on more local and state levels, but not on a national level. An average of 4.4 states per year considered, but did not adopt woman suffrage. Eight additional states also considered referendums on the issue; none, however, were successful.

Along with their success in western states, the AWSA also played a vital role in the passage of the 19th amendment which granted white woman the right to vote under constitutional law. Their efforts to promote Woman's Suffrage on more local and state levels through conferences, debates, speeches and even publishing their own journal all helped to push the agenda of Woman's Suffrage and ultimately gave positive recognition to the cause. The attention the AWSA gave to woman's suffrage and their work to spread the message were all contributing factors that led to the passage of the 19th amendment in 1920.

== Woman's Journal ==
The Woman's Journal played a fundamental role in the AWSA's ability to get their message and wants out into the public sphere.

The Woman's Journal became the heart and soul of the AWSA's mission. Lucy Stone and Henry Blackwell founded the journal in 1870, their daughter Alice eventually joined the journal's staff by becoming the sole editor after her parents passing. The journal never had any immense financial success attached to it, but it received widespread attention which heavily contributed to the Woman's Suffrage Movement. The journal covered a number of topics including the information regarding local conventions and events and it reported back on speeches including those at the New England Woman's Tea Party. The journal offered updates and tracked progress across the US on woman's suffrage victories. It also offered insights from the readers including editorials, letters from supporters, debates on other woman's rights issues, short stories and poetry.

The journal was eventually sold to the Leslie Woman Suffrage Commission who was headed by Carrie Chapman Catt, the journal was renamed to The Woman Citizen, three years later the 19th amendment was passed, and there was a decline in activism regarding the general sphere of woman's rights. The journal continued to publish, but now only monthly compared to their weekly publications, this lasted for a little over a decade until the journal finally called an end to publication in 1931.

== See also ==
- List of suffragists and suffragettes
- List of women's rights activists
- Timeline of women's suffrage
- Timeline of women's colleges in the United States
- Women's suffrage in the United States
- Women's suffrage organizations

== Bibliography ==
- Library of Congress, One Hundred Years toward Suffrage: An Overview.
- Elizabeth Cady Stanton, Susan B. Anthony, and Matilda Joslyn Gage, eds. History of Woman Suffrage, vol. 2 (1881).
- Elizabeth Cady Stanton, Susan B. Anthony, and Matilda Joslyn Gage, eds. History of Woman Suffrage, vol. 3 (1886).
- Susan B. Anthony and Ida Husted Harper, eds. History of Woman Suffrage, vol. 4 (1902).
- Carrie Chapman Catt and Nettie Rogers Shuler. Woman Suffrage And Politics: The Inner Story Of The Suffrage Movement (1926).
- Alice Sheppard, Cartooning for Suffrage (University of New Mexico Press, 1994).
- Eleanor Flexner, Century of Struggle: The Woman's Rights Movement in the United States, Enlarged Edition (1959; Harvard University Press, 1996). ISBN 0-674-10653-9
