= Anna Ella Carroll =

American politician, pamphleteer, lobbyist (1815-1894)

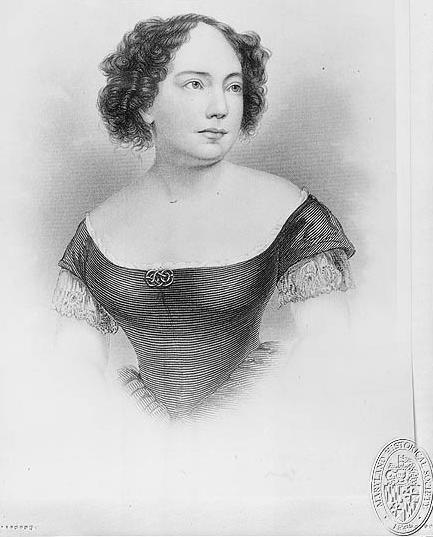
- Anna Ella Carroll, 1815–1894
- Born: Anna Ella Carroll; August 29, 1815 near Pocomoke City, Maryland
- Died: February 19, 1894 (aged 78); Washington, D.C.
- Resting place: Old Trinity Church, Church Creek, Maryland
- Occupations: Pamphleteer and advisor to 16th President Abraham Lincoln
- Parent(s): Thomas King Carroll and Julianna Stevenson

Anna Ella Carroll (August 29, 1815 – February 19, 1894) was an American political activist, pamphleteer and lobbyist. She wrote many pamphlets criticizing slavery. She played a significant role as an adviser to the Lincoln presidential cabinet during the American Civil War (1861–1865).

== Early life ==
Anna Carroll was born in 1815 on the Eastern Shore of Maryland into a prominent upper-class, religiously mixed Catholic-Protestant family. Her father was Thomas King Carroll, a planter who owned a 2,000-acre (8.1 km^{2}) tobacco plantation in Somerset County, and was the Governor of Maryland from 1830 to 1831. Her mother was the daughter of a Baltimore physician. She was also the eldest of eight children.

Anna was educated and trained by her father to be his aide. She was likely tutored in the law by him. This allowed her access into the male world of politics.

Anna contributed to her family's income by establishing a girls' school at their home of Kingston Hall. Little is known about her life between the ages of twenty and thirty-five.

== 1850s political career ==
Carroll entered the national political arena in the 1850s, following her father's appointment as Naval Officer for the District of Baltimore by Whig President Zachary Taylor. Shortly thereafter, Taylor died and Carroll's commission was signed by Millard Fillmore. In 1854, Carroll joined the American Party (the Know Nothing Party) following the demise of the Whigs. At the time much political realignment was going on nationwide. The same year the Republican Party was formed. The Southern pro-slavery Democrats took over control of their party's leadership in Congress due to the defeat of many Northern Democrats following the passage of the unpopular Kansas–Nebraska Act in May.

In Maryland, large numbers of immigrants, largely Irish and German Catholics, had flooded into Baltimore during the Great Famine in Ireland and the 1848 Revolutions in Germany. They took work in the port and railroad yards. Due to this rapid increase in population density, there was competition with free people of color for housing and jobs; street crime became a problem and relief rolls rose. At the same time, planters were a strong force in the state; many Catholic and Episcopalian planters resided on the Eastern Shore, which continued as primarily agricultural. In 1853, the Maryland Know Nothing party was formed, initially from three nativist groups. Yet beginning in February, it took in large numbers of striking laborers from the ironwork's factory in Baltimore, whom the Democratic Party had refused to support. In opposing the pro-slavery Democrats, the Know Nothings became a powerful, but divisive, party in the state. They were pro-Union, pro-labor, anti-Catholic, and anti-immigrant.

Along with other reformers, Anna Carroll campaigned by writing against urban machine corruption, crime, and what was perceived as the political threat of the power of the Catholic Church. In Maryland the Catholic planter/urban vote could combine to establish a pro-slavery state government. In 1856, the Whig Party split nationally into Northern and Southern factions due to the slavery issue. During the 1856 presidential election, Carroll supported and campaigned on behalf of Fillmore, the Know Nothing candidate. Carroll wrote many articles and pamphlets and she toured the Northeast on his behalf. Considered a moderate, Fillmore carried the state of Maryland, his only victory in the election.

For the 1856 campaign, Anna Carroll published two party books that greatly extended her political and press contacts: The Great American Battle, or, The Contest Between Christianity and Political Roman-ism and The Star of the West, and influential pamphlets such as "The Union of the States". The former book was a virulent criticism of the political influence of the Roman Catholic Church under the papacy of Pius IX (see anti-clericalism). In 1857 Carroll was the chief publicist for Governor Thomas H. Hicks of Maryland; he credited his victory to her writings. In 1858, she took up the cause of former Congressman John Minor Botts, a Unionist from Virginia, in his presidential bid. She published a series of articles in the New York Evening Express newspaper on the 1860 candidates under the pseudonym "Hancock." Others over time appeared in the influential National Intelligencer, among other venues.

== Secession role ==
With the election of Abraham Lincoln as president in 1860, Carroll freed her slaves. She began to work to oppose the secession of the Southern states and helped keep Maryland loyal to the Union. Lincoln's election set off the secession movement, which began with South Carolina's exit on December 20, 1860. The first six states to secede were those that held the largest number of slaves. In February 1861, the Confederate government was formed in Montgomery, Alabama. During this time Carroll was advising Governor Thomas H. Hicks on compromise efforts in the Congress. After Virginia seceded, she sent him intelligence on Confederate plans that might have resulted in a coup d'état of Washington, D.C., had Maryland seceded.

During the summer of 1861, Carroll wrote a political pamphlet in response to a speech given on the floor of the senate by the Hon. John C. Breckinridge of Kentucky. He had argued that Lincoln had acted in violation of the Constitution by mustering state militias into service following the bombardment of Fort Sumter, suspending the writ of habeas corpus, and imposing martial law and a naval blockade. In her reply pamphlet, which was widely circulated by the Lincoln administration, Carroll made informed legal arguments, later used by Attorney General Edward Bates, stating that Lincoln had acted in accordance with the Constitution. She noted that, as the chief enforcement officer of the nation, Lincoln could use all his powers to enforce federal law in the Southern states. Those powers included his role as commander-in-chief of the armed forces. Under an agreement made with the government, by 1862 Carroll had produced three more war powers pamphlets that presented able constitutional arguments supporting the federal government's actions. Governor Hicks wrote that her documents did more to elect a Union man as his successor than "all the rest of the campaign documents together."

== Wartime role ==
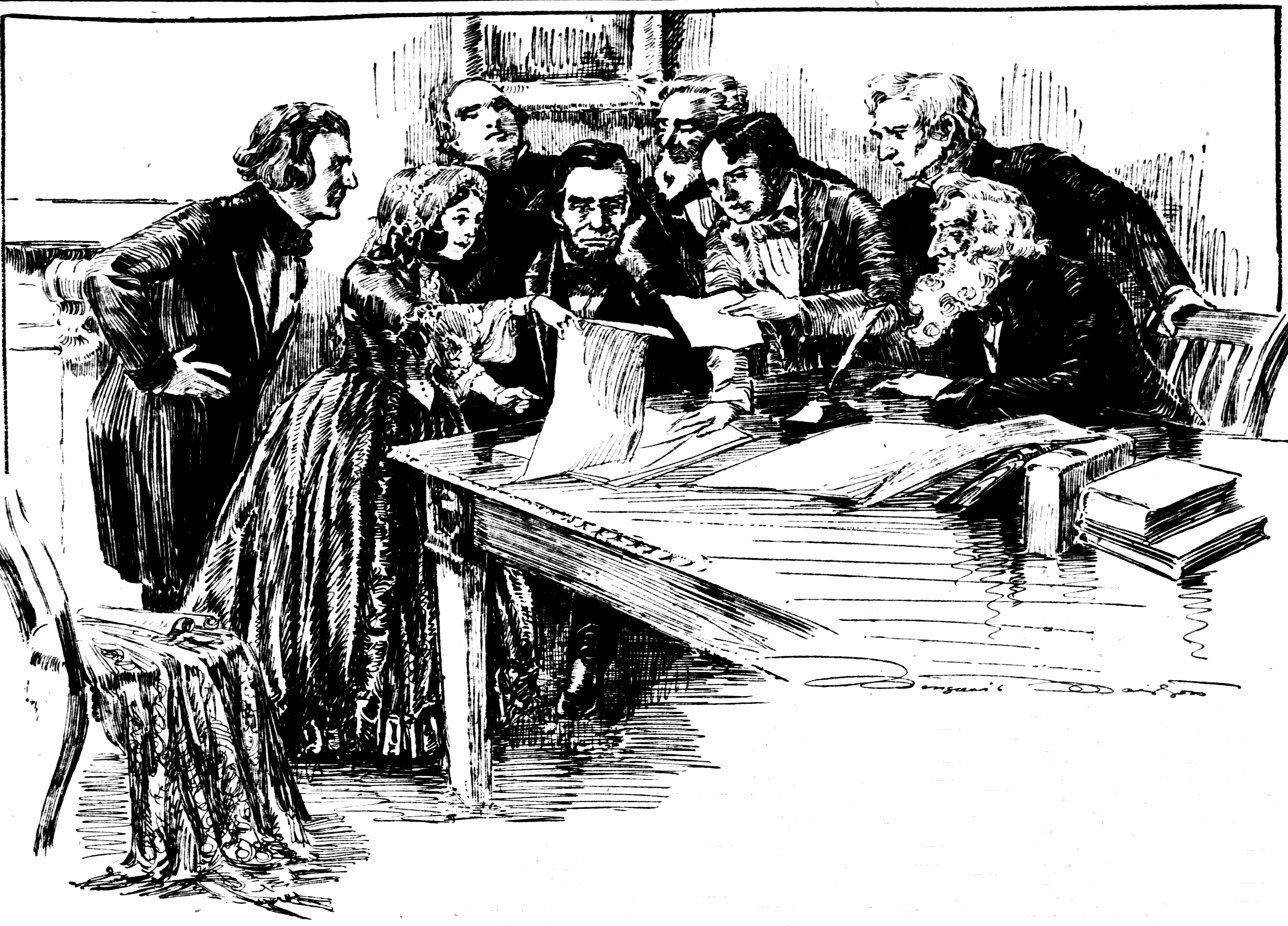
Carroll shows war plans to Lincoln and his cabinet in this imaginative 1918 drawing by Marguerite Martyn of the St. Louis Post-Dispatch.

In the fall of 1861, Carroll traveled to St. Louis to work with secret agent, Judge Lemuel Dale Evans, who had been appointed by Secretary of State William H. Seward to assess the feasibility of a Union invasion of Texas. Carroll worked on her second war powers paper at the Mercantile Library. She also gathered information from the head librarian, who was the brother of Confederate General Joe Johnston. She took military matters into her own hands when she initiated an interview with a riverboat pilot, Capt. Charles M. Scott, about the feasibility of the planned Union Mississippi River expedition. Scott told her that he and other pilots thought the advance ill-conceived because there were many defensible points on the Mississippi River that could be reinforced. It could take years just to open up the river to navigation by trying to broach those points. Carroll questioned Scott about the feasibility of using the Tennessee and Cumberland rivers for a Union invasion of the South. Scott provided Carroll with technical navigation details. Based on this information, Carroll wrote a memorandum to Assistant Secretary of War Thomas A. Scott and Attorney General Edward Bates in late November 1861, advocating that the combined army-navy forces change their invasion route from the Mississippi to the Tennessee and Cumberland rivers.

Meanwhile, in St. Louis, Major General Henry W. Halleck was planning the same movement without Lincoln's knowledge. Upon learning that Confederates were possibly sending reinforcements west from Virginia, Halleck ordered Brigadier General Ulysses S. Grant and Flag Officer Andrew Hull Foote to immediately move on Fort Henry and Fort Donelson on the Tennessee and Cumberland rivers in a telegram dated January 30. Scott was dispatched to the Midwest to mobilize reinforcements for Halleck on the night of January 29. On February 6, Fort Henry fell to Foote's gunboats and on February 13, Fort Donelson fell to Grant's and Foote's combined forces. These comprised the first two "real victories" of the Civil War for the Union, as Gen. William Sherman wrote later. At the time Carroll's role in the effort was kept secret. Immediately following the war, she gave credit for the plan to Capt. Charles Scott in a letter printed in a leading Washington newspaper. Years later, Assistant Secretary of War Scott and Senator Wade testified to her critical role before Congress.

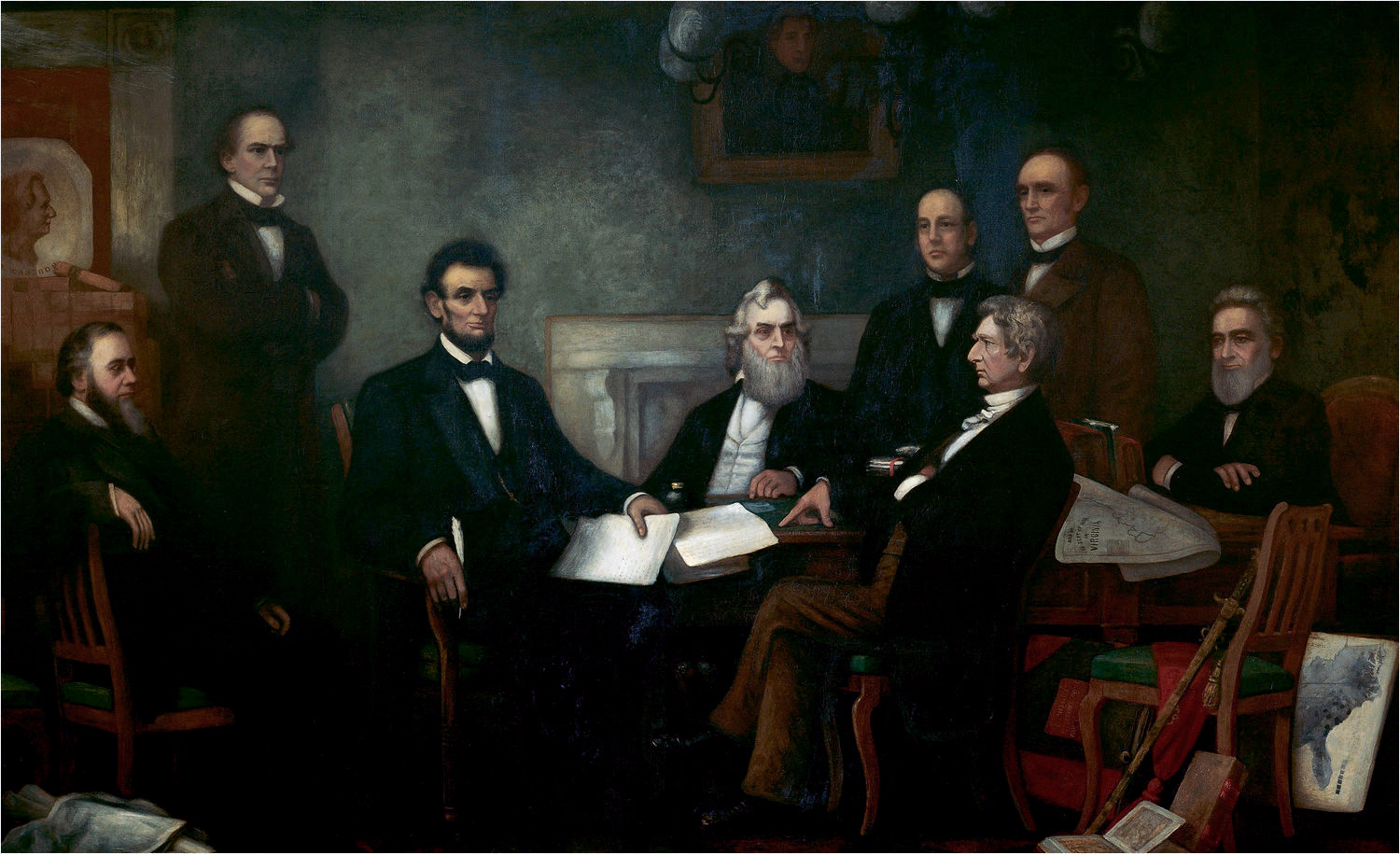
The signing of the Emancipation Proclamation by Francis Bicknell Carpenter, 1864. Showing the empty chair, believed by some to be an allusion to Carroll.

During the remainder of the war, Carroll worked with Lincoln on issues pertaining to emancipation and colonization of American slaves. She and Aaron Columbus Burr lobbied him to establish a colony of freedmen in British Honduras, today Belize. Although Carroll had freed her own slaves, she lobbied Lincoln against issuing the Emancipation Proclamation. She feared that this action would cost the support of Southern Unionists and resistance to the Union would be stiffened. But, she wrote that Lincoln did have the constitutional right to free the slaves as a temporary war measure under his power as commander-in-chief, since the proclamation would help cripple the organized forces of the rebellion. Yet the measure was not a transfer of title and would have to be suspended once the war emergency ended. To free the slaves required a constitutional amendment.

== Postwar life and death ==
In the postwar years, Carroll traveled with Lemuel Evans to report on his role in the Texas constitutional convention to draw up a new state constitution. She was active in the Republican Party in Maryland and continued her political writing career. After 1870, however, she had to devote much time to trying to gain payment for $5,000 (~$127,303 in 2025) which she insisted that the government still owed her for her wartime publications. She went through twenty years of congressional hearings. Every military committee but one voted in her favor, but no bills passed the Congress. She filed a claim in the United States Court of Claims in 1885, but was denied. Justice J. Nott wrote that the documents she used to back up her claim were "impressive" but "valueless as blank paper" because "they establish no judicial fact." Despite the rulings against her claim—or, more likely, because of those negative rulings—Carroll received support from women's and suffrage organizations. The suffragists commissioned a biography of her in 1891 by Sarah Ellen Blackwell.

Anna Ella Carroll died of Bright's disease, a kidney ailment, on February 19, 1894, at the age of 79. She is buried at Old Trinity Church, near Church Creek, Maryland, beside her parents and other members of her family. The epitaph on her grave reads, "A woman rarely gifted; an able and accomplished writer."

In 1959, the state historical society unveiled a monument to Carroll with the words, "Maryland's Most Distinguished Lady. A great humanitarian and close friend of Abraham Lincoln. She conceived the successful Tennessee Campaign and guided the President on his constitutional war powers." The gravestone was inscribed with 1893 as the year of her death, but a Washington, D.C., death certificate lists the correct death year of 1894. Surviving letters in her writing exist from that year before her death.

== Later evaluation ==
Well into the 20th century, Carroll was hailed as a feminist heroine whose contributions were denied because of her sex. Some scholars, however, have attempted to discredit her tale, arguing that she was more a "relentless self-promoter" than the "woman who saved the Union," as novelists, playwrights, and suffragists called her. Carroll had condemned the Emancipation Proclamation and recommended colonization of blacks. Yet research published in 2004 unveiled new sources, primarily Maryland political histories and Lincoln administration records, that analyze the Maryland Know Nothing party in a new progressive light. These materials generally support (but slightly diminish) Carroll's role in the Tennessee River campaign. A plan nearly identical to Carroll's was printed in the New York Times two weeks prior to the date Carroll said she sent her plan to the War Department in Washington; a similar version was printed in late December. Original sources found in Carroll's papers, housed in the Maryland State Archives, remain problematic as source material. Many of them, purportedly from leading politicians of the time, are in her handwriting, a distinctive scrawl.

== See also ==
- Carroll family

== Bibliography ==
- Baltimore, Maryland. Maryland Historical Society, Library, Manuscripts Department, A. E. Carroll papers, 1822–1890, MS 1224; Carroll, Cradock, Jensen family papers, 1738–1968, MS 1976.
- Blackwell, Sarah Ellen. A Military Genius: Life of Anna Ella Carroll of Maryland, ("the great unrecognized member of Lincoln's cabinet"). Vol. 1. Washington, D. C.: Judd & Detweiler printers, 1891.
- Carroll, Anna Ella. "Hancock" [pseud.] series, written for the 1860 presidential election, New York Evening Express, 23 June 1859, 8 July 1859, 15 July 1859, 5 September 1859.
- ——. Reply [to the speech of the Hon. John C. Breckinridge, delivered in the U.S. Senate, 16 July 1861]. Washington, D. C.: Henry Polkinhorn, 1861.
- ——. The Constitutional Power of the President to Make Arrests and Suspend the Writ of Habeas Corpus Examined, in Blackwell, Vol. 2, The Life and Writings of Anna Ella Carroll.
- ——. The Great American Battle, or, the Contest between Christianity and Political Romanism. New York and Auburn, N. Y.: Miller, Orton & Milligan, 1856.
- ——. The Relation of the National Government to the Revolted Citizens Defined. Washington, D.C.: Henry Polkinhorn, 1862.
- ——. The Star of the West, or, National Men and National Measures. 3rd rev. ed. New York: Miller, Orton & Milligan, 1857.
- ——. The War Powers of the General Government. Washington, D. C.: Henry Polkinhorn, 1861.
- Coryell, Janet L. "Anna Ella Carroll and the Historians," Civil War History 35 (June 1989): 120–137.
- ——. "Duty with Delicacy: Anna Ella Carroll of Maryland," Women in American Foreign Policy: Lobbyists, Critics and Insiders, ed. Edward Crapol. Westport, CT: Greenwood Press, 1987.
- ——. Neither Heroine Nor Fool: Anna Ella Carroll of Maryland. Kent, OH: Kent State University Press, 1990.
- Greenbie, Sydney, and Marjorie Barstow Greenbie, Anna Ella Carroll and Abraham Lincoln, Tampa: University of Tampa Press, 1952.
- Washington, D. C., National Archives, Legislative Records Section, Anna Ella Carroll file (plus Carroll's claims and memorials submitted to Congressional committees, printed privately by her).
- Lincoln's and Stanton's papers, Congressional records, biographies of Thomas H. Hicks and Thomas A. Scott, and the official records of the U. S. Army and Navy during the Civil War, and more.
