= List of women's suffrage publications =

== Publications ==
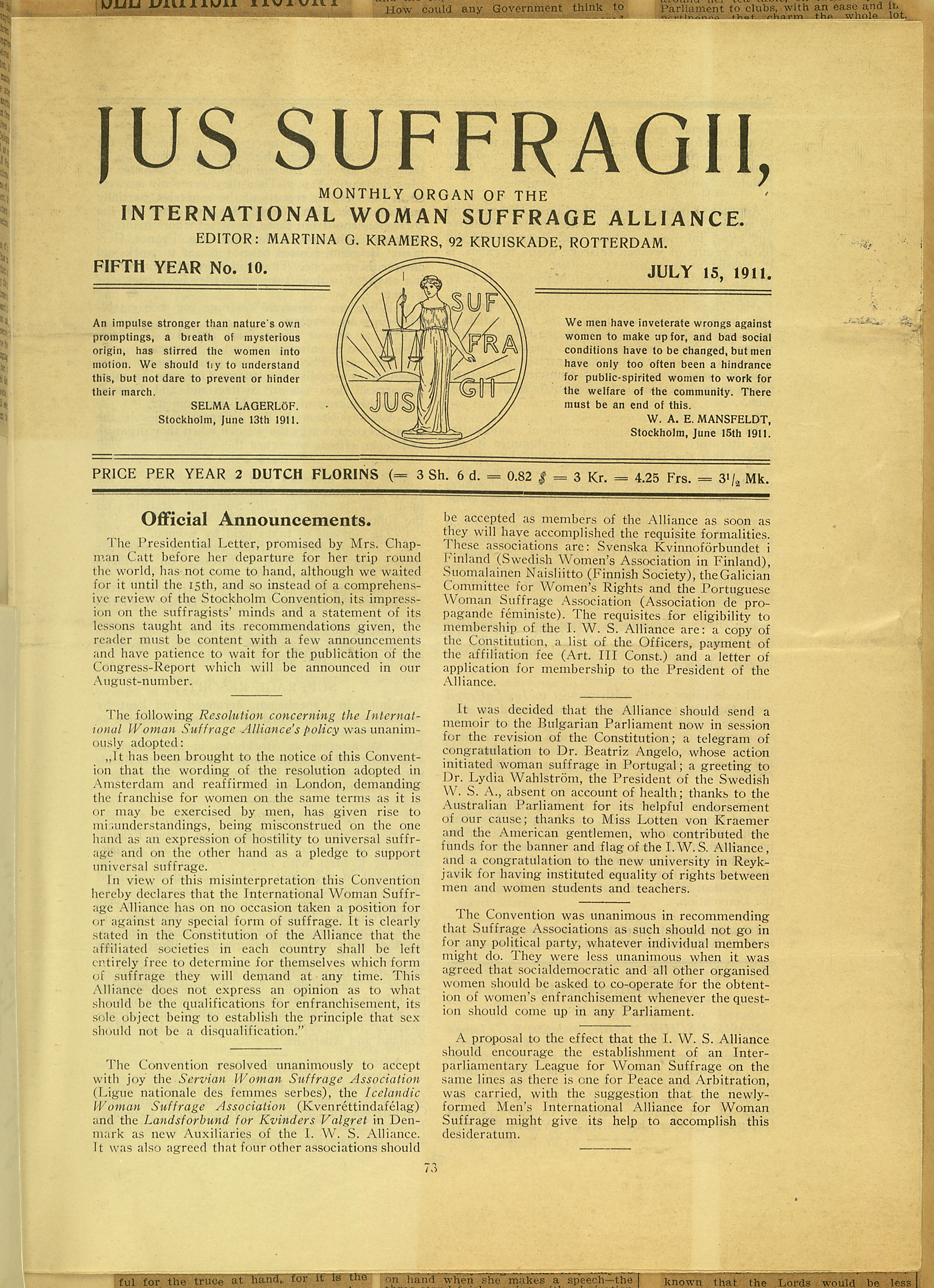
- Jus Suffragii, 1911
  History of Woman Suffrage – six books produced from 1881 to 1922 by Elizabeth Cady Stanton, Susan B. Anthony, Matilda Joslyn Gage and Ida Husted Harper.
- Suffragette Sally – a 1911 suffrage novel by Gertrude Colmore.

=== International ===
- Jus Suffragii – official journal of the International Woman Suffrage Alliance, published monthly from 1906 to 1924.

=== Belgium ===
- Ligue belge du droit des femmes (1892–1914)

=== China ===
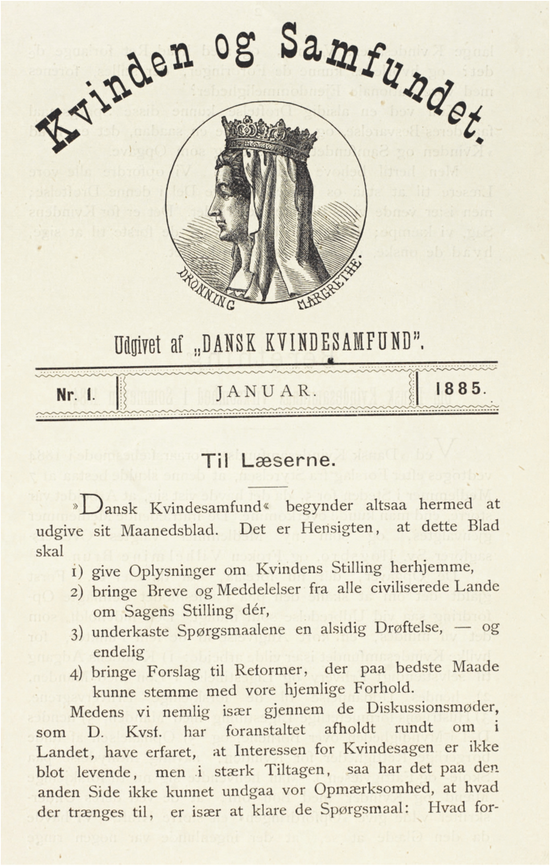
- Cover of the first issue of Kvinden & Samfundet, January 1885
  Women's Times (Chinese: 女子倍), founded by Lin Zongsu in Shanghai to publish information about suffrage and the Women's Suffrage Comrades Alliance (Chinese: 女子参政同志会).

=== Denmark ===
- Kvinden & Samfundet (Woman & Society), founded 1885 by the Danish Women's Society.

=== France ===
- L'Union nationale des femmes (National Union for the Vote for Women), French journal, which advocated for women's right to vote and equal rights (1927-1964)

=== Russia ===
- Women's Union (Союз женщин), published by the Union for Women's Equality, 1907–1909.

=== Sweden ===
- Dagny, 1886–1914
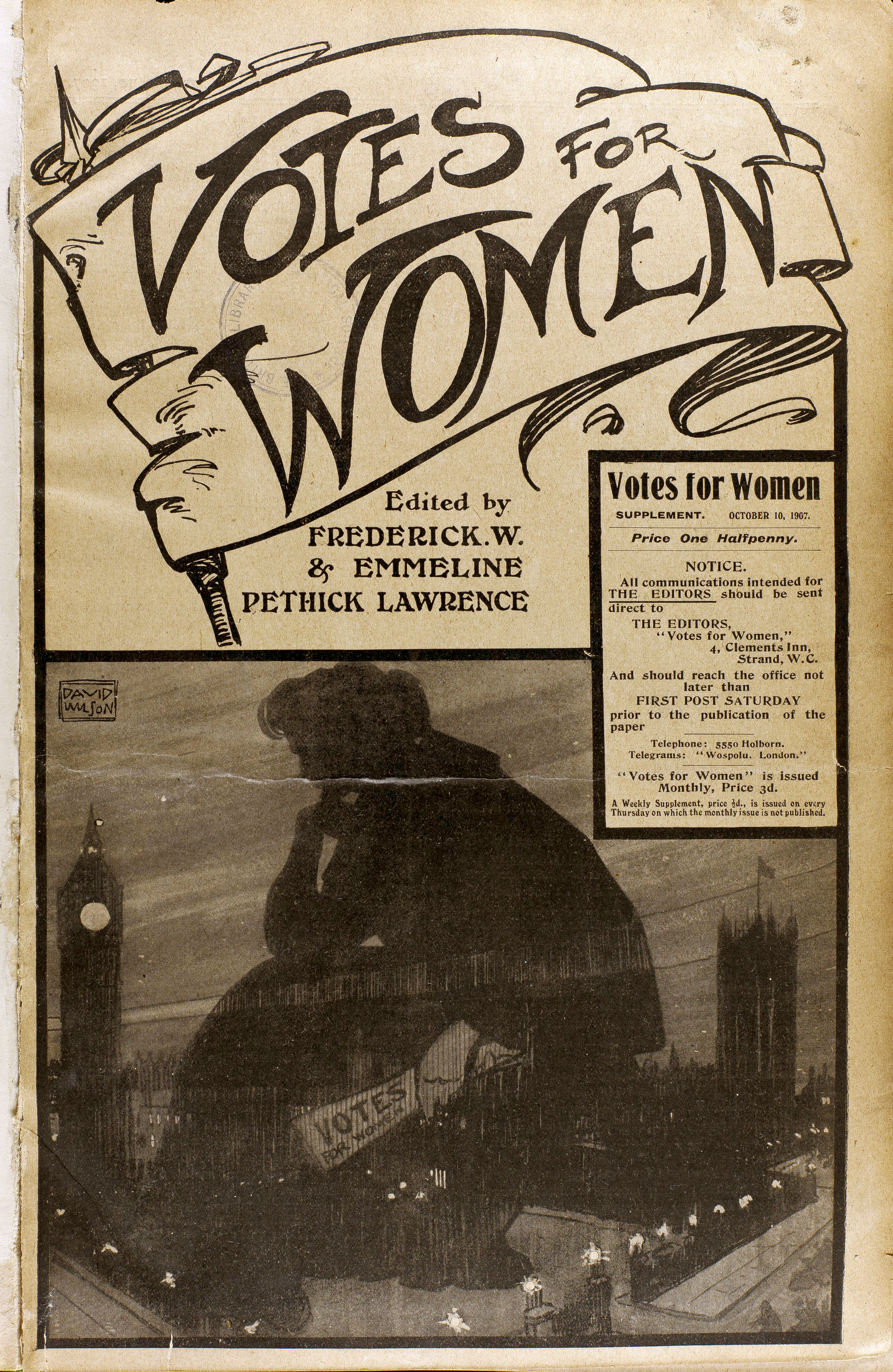
  Votes for Women newspaper, 1907
- Hertha, 1914–1990s, named after Swedish writer and feminist Fredrika Bremer's novel Hertha

=== United Kingdom ===
- Suffrage Atelier – publishing collective in England, founded in 1909.
- The Common Cause – weekly publication that supported the National Union of Women's Suffrage Societies from 1909 to 1920. Founded by Margaret Ashton.
- The Freewoman – feminist weekly which, among other topics, covered the suffrage movement; published between November 1911 and October 1912 and edited by Dora Marsden and Mary Gawthorpe.
- The Free Church Suffrage Times – monthly nonconformist Christian newspaper associated with the women's suffrage movement, published between 1913 and 1916.
- The Irish Citizen – the official publication of the Irish Women's Franchise League, published between 1912 and 1920.
- Suffragette Sally – 1911 suffrage novel by Gertrude Colmore.
- The Vote – publication of British Women's Freedom League.
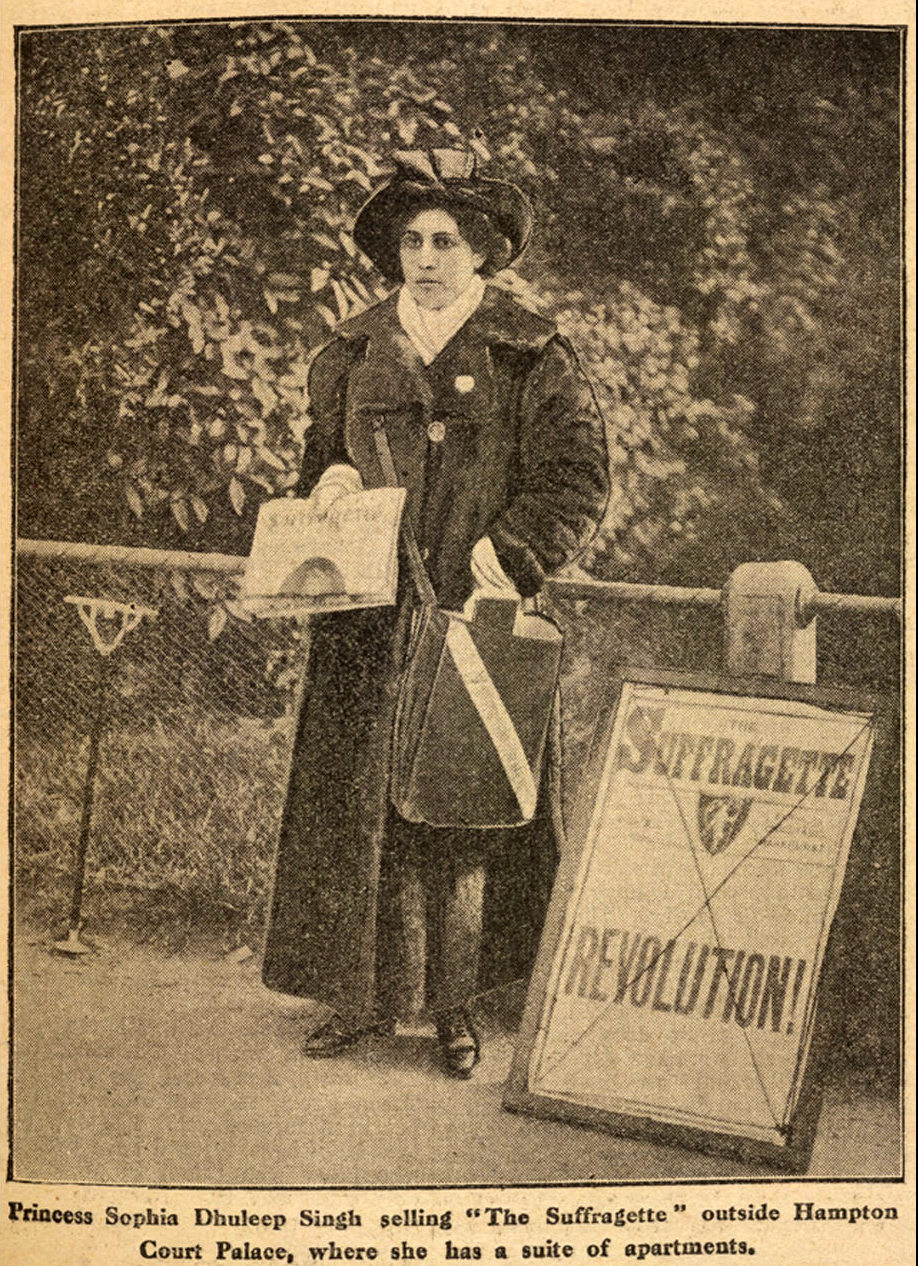
  Princess Sophia Duleep-Singh selling copies of The Suffragette
- Votes for Women – 1907–1918 newspaper, the official paper of the Women's Social and Political Union, United Kingdom. It was succeeded by The Suffragette in 1912, which was edited by Christabel Pankhurst and managed by Agnes Lake.
- The Women's Dreadnought - official publication of the East London Federation of Suffragettes, began publishing in 1914.
- Women's Suffrage Journal – magazine published 1871–1890 in the United Kingdom.

=== United States ===
- Nineteenth Amendment to the United States Constitution – giving women the right to vote in the United States, ratified in 1920.
- Declaration of Sentiments – major statement for women's rights, including the right to vote, passed and signed at the Seneca Falls Convention in 1848; mainly written by Elizabeth Cady Stanton.
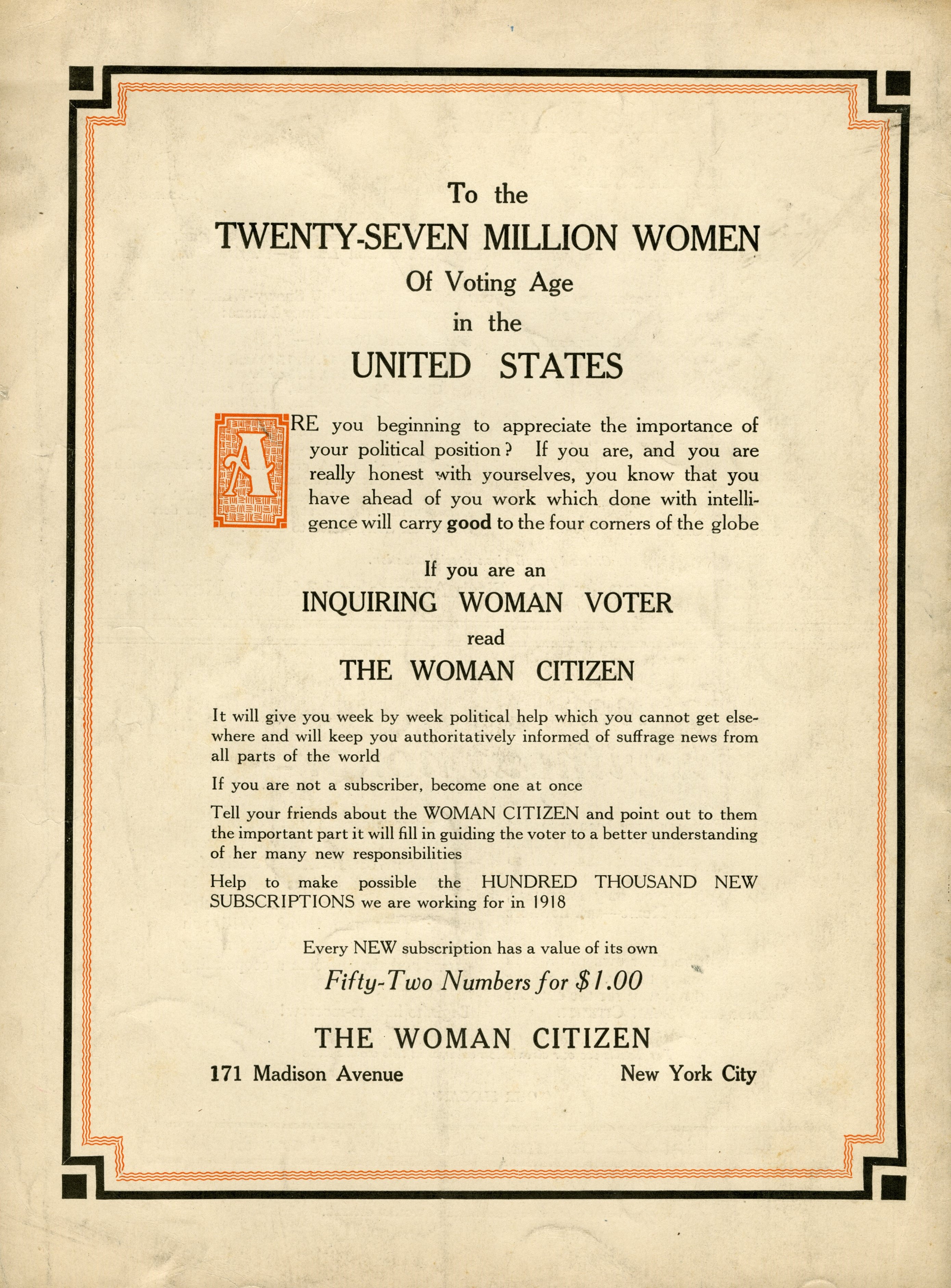
- Back cover of The Woman Citizen magazine from January 19, 1918
  History of Woman Suffrage – six books produced from 1881 to 1922 by Elizabeth Cady Stanton, Susan B. Anthony, Matilda Joslyn Gage and Ida Husted Harper.
- The Forerunner -- United States journal created by Charlotte Perkins Gilman, supporting feminism and women's suffrage.
- The Liberator – weekly newspaper published by William Lloyd Garrison which, although primarily supporting abolition of slavery, also took up the suffrage cause from 1838 until it closed in 1865.
- The Lily—published between 1849 and 1856 and edited by Amelia Bloomer.
- Lucifer, the Light-Bearer—publication in the U.S. supporting women's rights from 1883 to 1907.
- Maryland Suffrage News—Founded in 1912 for the Just Government League of Maryland.
- The Revolution – weekly US newspaper, 1868–1872; official publication of the National Woman Suffrage Association.
- The Suffragist – 1913–1920 newspaper of the Congressional Union for Woman Suffrage.
- The Una – 1853 paper devoted to the enfranchisement of woman, owned and edited by Paulina Wright Davis, and first published in Providence, Rhode Island. The Una was the first paper focused on woman suffrage, and the first distinctively woman's rights journal.
- Woman's Journal and Suffrage News – major weekly newspaper founded by Lucy Stone and Henry Blackwell in 1870, eventually absorbed other suffrage publications.
- The Woman's Tribune – newspaper published from 1883 to 1909 by Clara Bewick Colby.
- The Woman Voter—U.S. publication first published in 1910 by the Woman Suffrage Party.
- Woodhull & Claflin's Weekly—women's rights newspaper in the United States.

== See also ==
- Women's suffrage
- List of suffragists and suffragettes
- List of women's suffrage organizations
- Timeline of women's suffrage
