= Rose Emmet Young =

American writer and suffragist

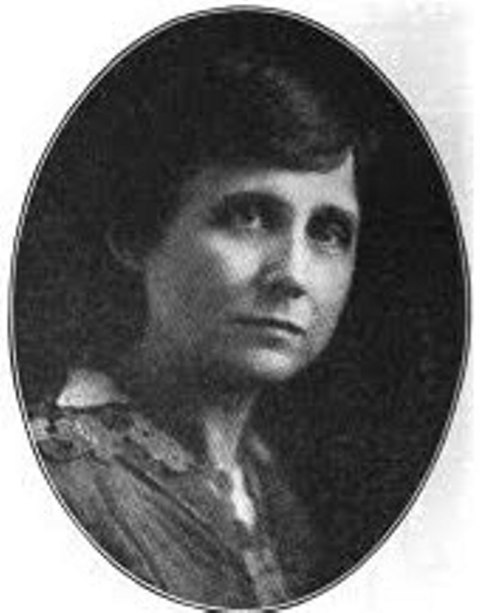
- Rose Emmet Young in 1919
- Born: 1869; Lexington, Missouri
- Died: 1941 (aged 71–72)
- Other names: Rose Young; Rose Emmet; R.E. Young
- Occupations: Writer, Suffragist

Rose Emmet Young (1869–1941; also known as Rose Young, Rose Emmet, or R.E. Young) was an American fiction and editorial writer, and an advocate for the suffrage movement.

== Background and early work ==
Rose Emmet Young was born in Lexington, Missouri and spent her childhood there. Prior to her work in the suffrage movement and as a writer, she ran a lumber company.

Young contributed to magazines and editorials under the pen name R.E. Young. Her fiction was published in Harper's, McClure's, The Century Magazine, Collier's and Atlantic Monthly; she was the literary and art editor for the University Publishing Co. for four years. Young moved to New York in 1899 and worked on the staff of the New York Evening Post. She spent much of her life in New York.

== Suffrage movement ==
In 1915, Young was hired by Carrie Chapman Catt to create and direct the Leslie Bureau of Suffrage Education, the press bureau for the Leslie Woman Suffrage Commission and the National American Woman Suffrage Association. The bureau was created with funds from an inheritance, valued at nearly one million dollars, left to the cause of women's suffrage by Miriam Leslie. The Bureau was a daily news service distributed in all fifty states that collected and distributed information about women's right to vote; Young's job was to compile and redistribute news, editorials, photographs, cartoons and statistics to newspapers across the United States to inform the public about efforts related to women's suffrage and advocate for its adoption. The Bureau claimed that its news service, through distribution by the Associated Press and other wire services, reached ten to twenty million readers.

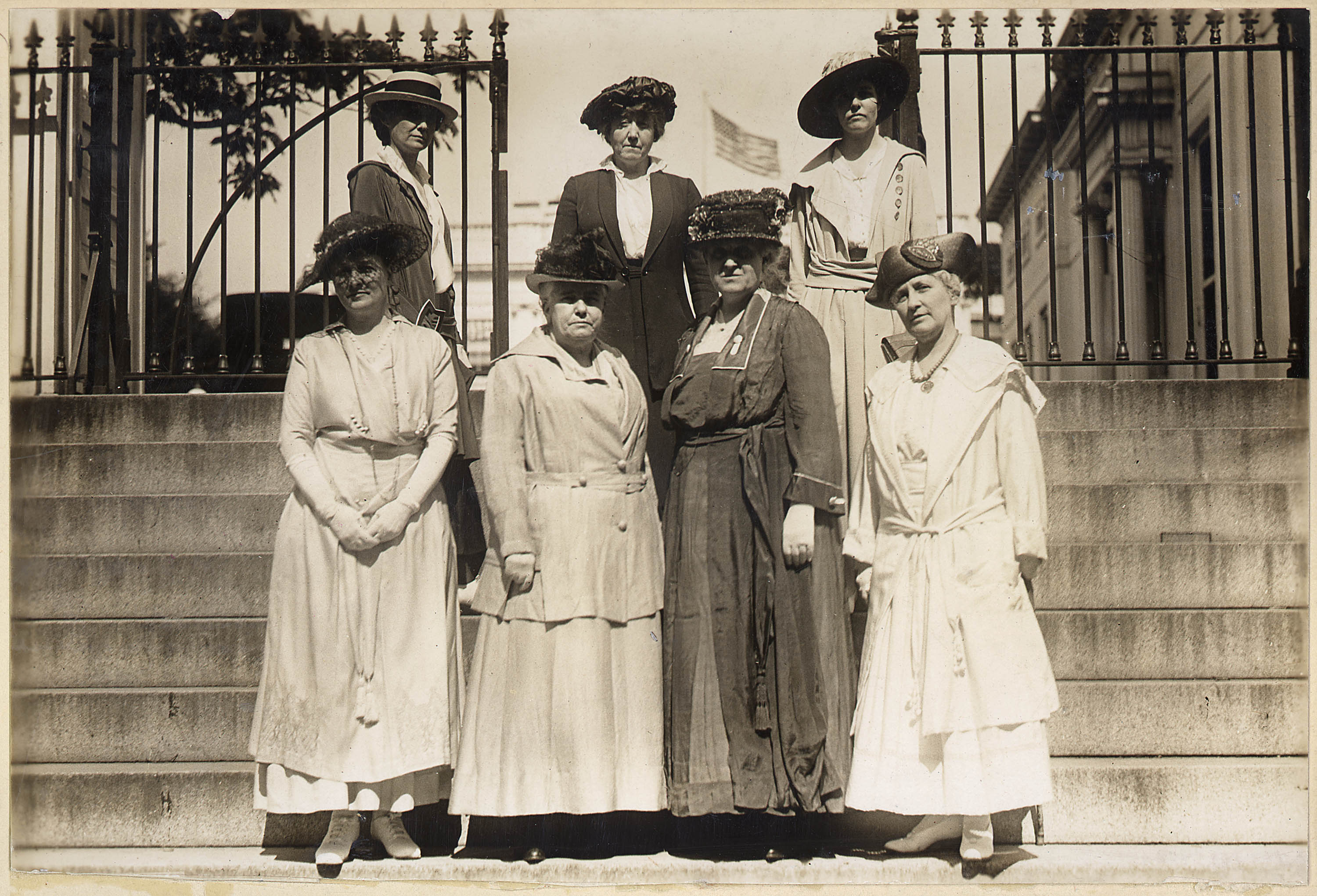
Rose Emmet Young (top row, first from left)

As an extension of that effort, Young created and was editor-in-chief of The Woman Citizen (later The Woman's Journal), a weekly newsletter for women that merged three existing publications: Woman's Journal, National Suffrage News, and The Woman Voter. This project extended the reach of the Leslie Bureau's research department for compiling statistics, lists of books, and editorial pieces. The Woman Citizen operated out of 171 Madison Avenue in New York City and on its own had a circulation of 20,000 readers.

Young also contributed to several magazines and newspapers by writing editorials advocating for the advancement of the cause of women's suffrage.

== Published works ==
=== Novels ===
- Sally of Missouri (1903)
- Henderson (1903)
- Murder at Mason’s (1927)

=== Short stories ===
- "Petticoat Push" (1906/1907), published in Harper's Bazaar
- "With Reluctant Feet" (1906/1907), published in Harper's Bazaar
- "The Substance of Things Hoped For" (1906/1907), published in Harper's Bazaar

=== Plays ===
- "The Cigar Smoker" (performed 1936), co-written with Marie Jenney Howe.

=== Non-fiction works ===
- The record of the Leslie woman suffrage commission, inc., 1917-1929 (1929)
- Why wars must cease (1935) (Editor; In collaboration with Carrie Chapman Catt and Eleanor Roosevelt)
