= History of Woman Suffrage =

Six-volume book published from 1881 to 1922

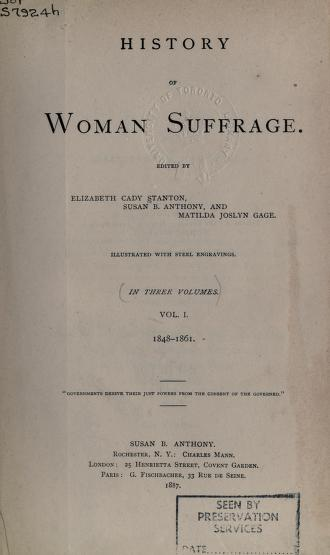
- Subject: Woman's suffrage movement
- Publication date: 1881

History of Woman Suffrage is a work begun by Elizabeth Cady Stanton, Susan B. Anthony, Matilda Joslyn Gage, and completed by Ida Husted Harper. Published in six volumes from 1881 to 1922, it is a history of the women's suffrage movement, primarily in the United States. Its more than 5700 pages are the major source for primary documentation of the women's suffrage movement from its beginnings through the ratification of the Nineteenth Amendment to the U.S. Constitution, which enfranchised women in the U.S. in 1920. Written from the viewpoint of the wing of the movement led by Stanton and Anthony, its coverage of other groups and individuals is limited.

Realizing that the project was unlikely to make a profit, Anthony used money from a bequest in 1885 to buy the rights from the other authors and also the plates from the publisher of the two volumes that had already been issued. As sole owner, she published the books herself and donated many copies to libraries and people of influence. In her will, Anthony bequeathed the plates for all the volumes together with the existing inventory to the National American Woman Suffrage Association.

== Writing and publishing ==
Susan B. Anthony and Elizabeth Cady Stanton, leaders of National Woman Suffrage Association (NWSA), initiated the project of writing a history of the women's suffrage movement in 1876. The project dominated their lives for much of the next decade, although Anthony in particular also maintained a busy schedule of lecturing and other women's suffrage activities. Originally envisioned as a modest publication that would take only four months to write, it evolved into a work of more than 5700 pages written over a period of 41 years. It was completed in 1922, long after the deaths of Stanton and Anthony in 1902 and 1906 respectively.

In the introduction to the first volume the authors wrote: "We hope the contribution we have made may enable some other hand in the future to write a more complete history of 'the most momentous reform that has yet been launched on the world—the first organized protest against the injustice which has brooded over the character and destiny of one-half the human race.'" The first volume, published in 1881, also states, “THESE VOLUMES ARE AFFECTIONATELY INSCRIBED TO THE Memory of Mary Wollstonecraft, Frances Wright, Lucretia Mott, Harriet Martineau, Lydia Maria Child, Margaret Fuller, Sarah and Angelina Grimké, Josephine S. Griffing, Martha C. Wright, Harriot K. Hunt, M.D., Mariana W. Johnson, Alice and Phebe Carey, Ann Preston, M.D., Lydia Mott, Eliza W. Farnham, Lydia F. Fowler, M.D., Paulina Wright Davis, Whose Earnest Lives and Fearless Words, in Demanding Political Rights for Women, have been, in the Preparation of these Pages, a Constant Inspiration TO The Editors”.

The first three volumes, which cover the history of the movement from its beginnings to 1885, were written and edited by Stanton, Anthony and Matilda Joslyn Gage. Volume 1 (1848–1861) appeared in 1881, Volume 2 (1861–1876) in 1882 and Volume 3 (1876–1885) in 1886. Some early chapters first appeared in Gage's newspaper, The National Citizen and Ballot Box.

Anthony had for years saved letters, newspaper clippings, and similar materials of historical value to the women's suffrage movement. In 1876 she shipped several trunks and boxes of these materials to the Stanton house in New Jersey and moved into that household herself to begin working on the project with Stanton. Anthony hated this type of work. In her letters, she said the project "makes me feel growly all the time... No warhorse ever panted for the rush of battle more than I for outside work. I love to make history but hate to write it." The work inevitably led to disagreements. Stanton's daughter Margaret reported that "Sometimes these disputes run so high that down go the pens, one sails out of one door and one out of the other, walking in opposite directions around the estate, and just as I have made up my mind that this beautiful friendship of forty years has at last terminated, I see them walking down the hill, arm in arm."

When Stanton was ill for several months in 1881, her daughter Harriot completed her editorial work for volume 2. Dismayed to learn that Anthony and Stanton had no plan for covering the history of the American Woman Suffrage Association (AWSA), a rival to their NWSA, Harriet Stanton also wrote that 107-page chapter herself with information gathered primarily from the Woman's Journal, a periodical published by the AWSA.

According to Ellen Carol DuBois, a historian of the women's movement, "The initial volumes are very broadly conceived, a combination of Stanton's broad philosophical range, Anthony's organizational energies and Gage's historical sensibilities." Anthony was the business manager. Stanton wrote much of the text, providing it with her distinct historical interpretation. Gage wrote several historical essays, including a long one that critically assesses Christianity's attitude toward women throughout history. Gage also provided a significant number of historical documents to the project and was adept at tracking down additional documentation in libraries.

In addition to chronicling the movement's activities, the initial volumes include reminiscences of movement leaders and analyses of the historical causes of the condition of women. They also contain a variety of primary materials, including letters, newspaper clippings, speeches, court transcripts and decisions, and conference reports. Volume three includes essays by local women's rights activists who provided details about the history of the movement at the state level. At Anthony's insistence, the volumes were indexed by a professional indexer and include many expensive steel engravings of women's rights leaders.

A bequest of $24,000 from Eliza Jackson Eddy to Anthony in 1885 provided financial assistance for the completion of these volumes. Recognizing that there was little chance of the project showing a profit, Anthony paid Stanton and Gage for their shares of the rights to the books. She issued Volume 3 in 1886, listing herself as publisher. She also bought the plates of Volumes 1 and 2, which had already been published, from Fowler and Wells, the publisher, and reprinted them in 1887, again listing herself as publisher. Anthony gave away over 1000 copies at her own expense, mailing them to political leaders and libraries in the U.S. and Europe. Publishing the first three volumes cost Anthony about $20,000.

Volume 4, which covers the period from 1883 to 1900, was published by Anthony in 1902, when she was 82 years old. Its editors are listed as Anthony and her younger protégé Ida Husted Harper, but Harper did most of the work." (Anthony also chose Harper to write her biography.) In an indication of the increased acceptance of the women's suffrage movement, Harvard University sent in an order for Volume 4. Less than twenty years earlier, when Anthony sent the school free copies of the first three volumes, Harvard had declined the gift and returned the books.

Publishing the volumes herself presented a variety of problems for Anthony, including finding space for the inventory. She was forced to limit the large number of books she was storing in the attic of the house she shared with sister because the weight was threatening to collapse the structure.

Volumes 5 and 6 were published in 1922 by the National American Woman Suffrage Association (NAWSA), long after Anthony's death in 1906. Edited by Harper, they are a pair of volumes that cover different aspects of the period from 1900 to 1920, the year that the Nineteenth Amendment to the U.S. Constitution was ratified. That amendment, popularly known as the Susan B. Anthony Amendment, prevents the denial of voting rights on the basis of sex.

The last three volumes include detailed information about the NAWSA, documenting its conventions, officers, committee reports and activities on both a national and state-by-state basis. The NAWSA was formed in 1890 by a merger of the National Woman Suffrage Association and the American Woman Suffrage Association. The former was led by Anthony and Stanton, while the latter was for twenty years its rival under the leadership of Lucy Stone. Anthony was the dominant figure in the merged organization. The last three volumes avoid discussion of conflicts within the women's movement during the period they cover. On the contrary, the narrative has a tone of the inevitability of the movement's victory under the leadership of a few talented leaders.

In her will, Anthony bequeathed the plates for the History of Woman Suffrage together with the existing inventory to the National American Woman Suffrage Association.

In 1978 Mari Jo Buhle and Paul Buhle condensed the most important parts of the massive History of Woman Suffrage into The Concise History of Woman Suffrage and published it as a single volume of fewer than 500 pages.

== Limitations ==
The History of Woman Suffrage provides only limited coverage to groups and individuals who competed with Susan B. Anthony and Elizabeth Cady Stanton for leadership of the women's suffrage movement. It only partially portrays the role of Lucy Stone, a pioneering women's rights advocate and a leader of the AWSA, a rival to the NWSA led by Stanton and Anthony. Stanton urged Stone to assist with the history project by writing an account of her own role in the movement, but Stone refused, saying the project should be left to a later generation because none of the leaders of the two rival groups would be able to write an impartial history. Stone accordingly provided Stanton with only minimal information about her activities and asked Stanton not to write a biographical sketch of her for inclusion in the history. A 107-page chapter on the history of the AWSA was included, however, compiled by Stanton's daughter Harriot Stanton Blatch in 1882. The History of Woman Suffrage provides only minimal coverage of the activities of the militant National Woman's Party, founded in 1913 by Alice Paul and other activists who were formerly members of the NAWSA.

According to historian Ellen Carol DuBois, the History of Woman Suffrage established for several decades the consensus view of the history of the women's movement, a "frozen account of the past, a history characterized by celebration, inevitability and canonization". Historian and biographer Lori D. Ginzberg said, "In that story, Stanton alone articulated the demand for woman suffrage, and Anthony led the charge; there was only one major organization (theirs); and the differences of principle that led to the division brooked no debate." Historian Lisa Tetrault said that Stanton and Anthony mapped a single, accessible narrative onto what had in fact been "a sprawling, multifaceted campaign". Tetrault said they placed themselves and their allies at the center of the story and minimized or ignored the roles of Stone and others who did not fit into their narrative. Scholarly research into women's history began to break out of this framework with the publication of Eleanor Flexner's Century of Struggle in 1959.

== Significance ==
In Woman Suffrage and Women's Rights, historian Ellen Carol DuBois said "There is nothing in the annals of American reform quite like History of Woman Suffrage, a prolonged, deliberate effort on the part of activists to ensure their place in the historical record." The Encyclopedia of Women's History in America described the History of Woman Suffrage as "the fundamental primary source for the women's suffrage campaign". In Elizabeth Cady Stanton: an American Life, Lori D. Ginzberg similarly described it as "the major, if not the definitive, collection of primary source materials on the nineteenth-century movement." Referring to the several volumes of the History, Tetrault said, "More than 125 years after their publication, they remain an indispensable source, having stood for much of that time as the richest repository of published, accessible documentary evidence of nineteenth century suffrage movements."

== Images of main contributors ==
The History of Woman Suffrage contains more than 80 images of women activists, including these images of its four main contributors:

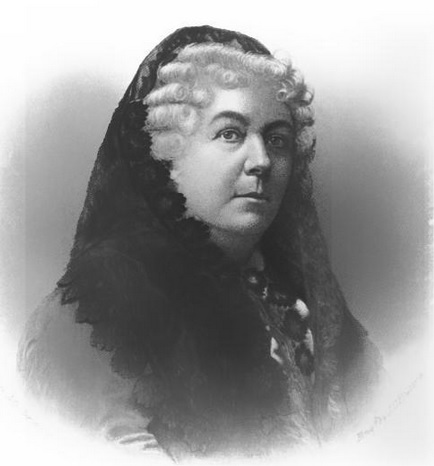
Elizabeth Cady Stanton

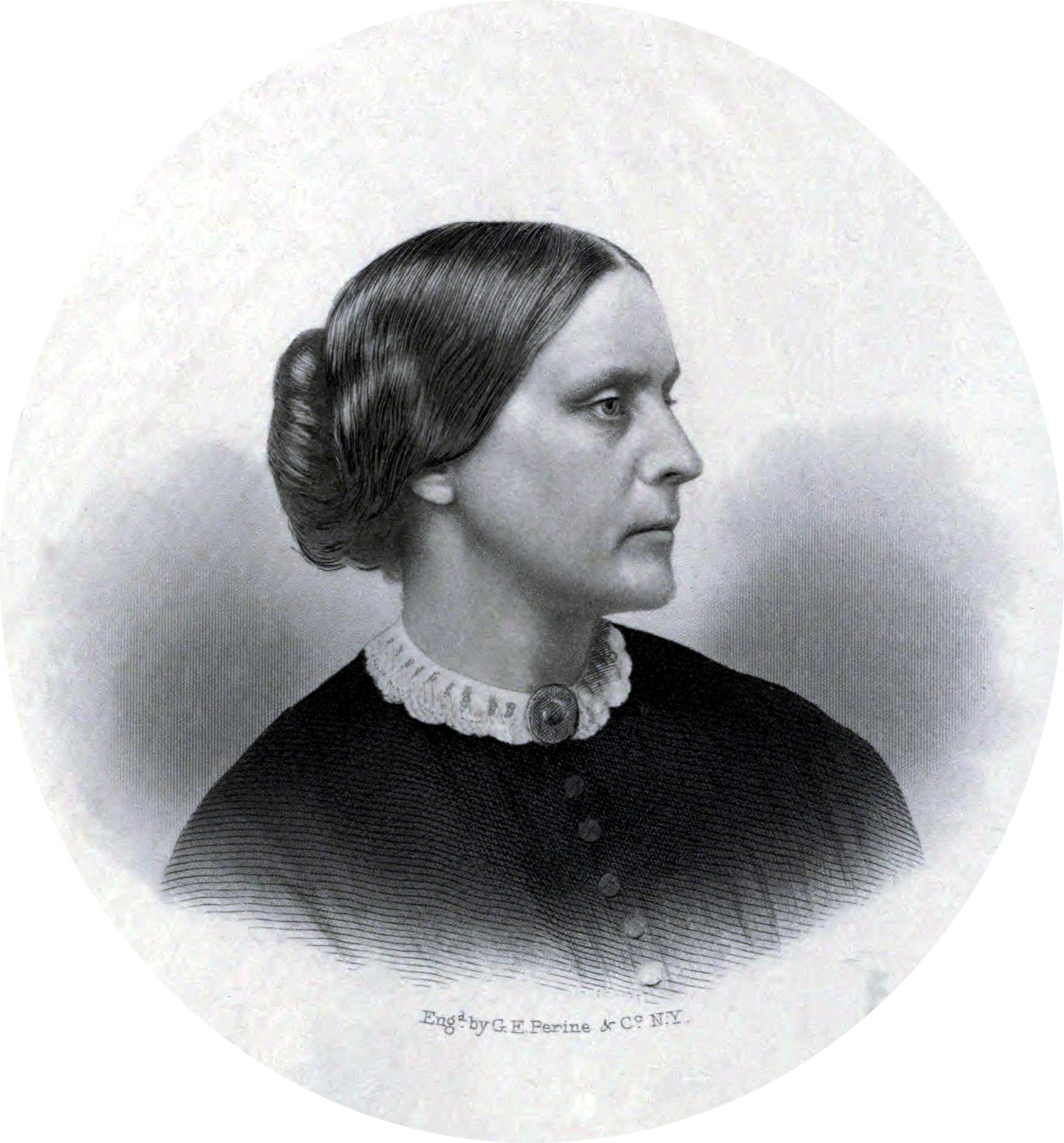
Susan B. Anthony

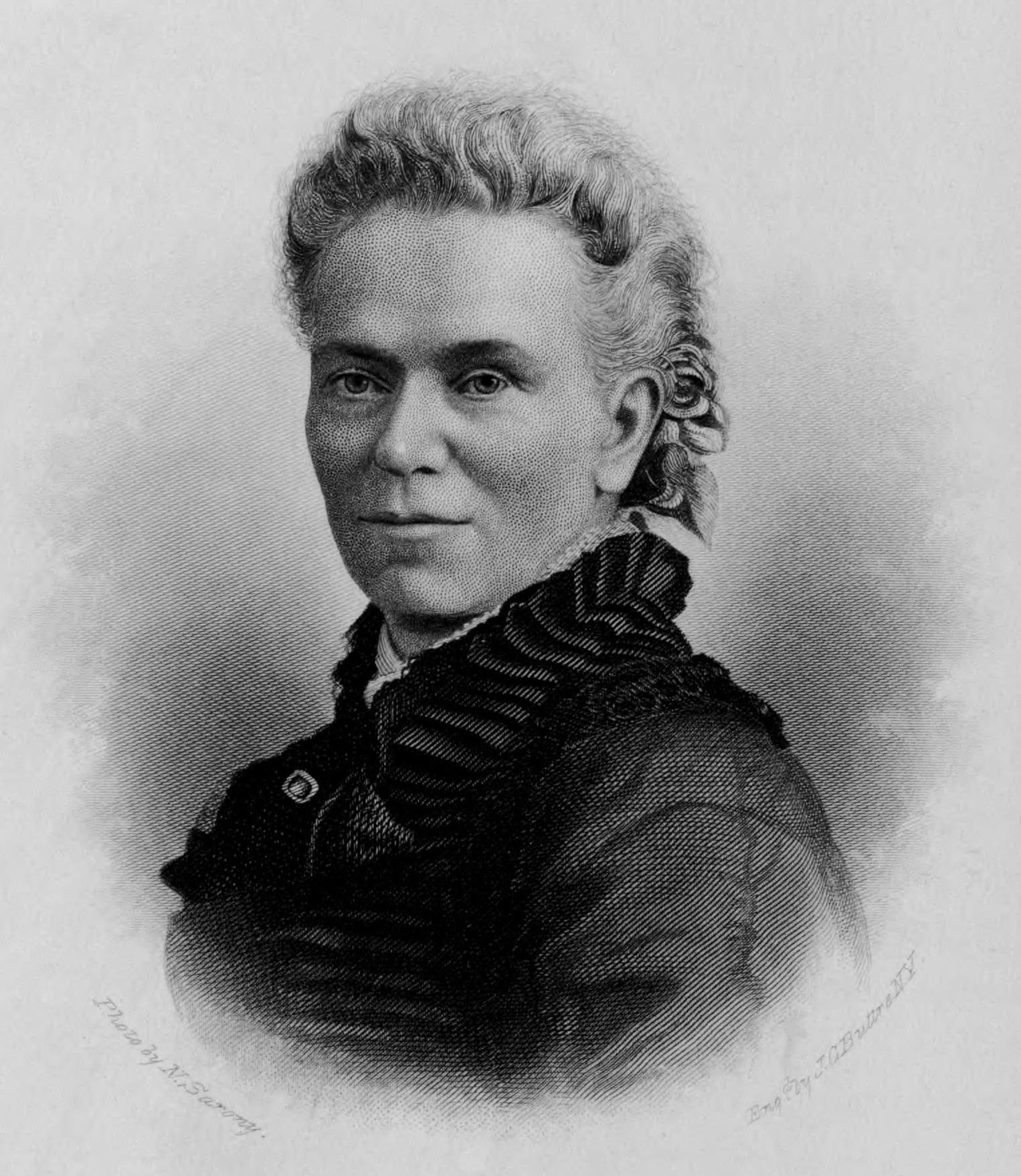
Matilda Joslyn Gage

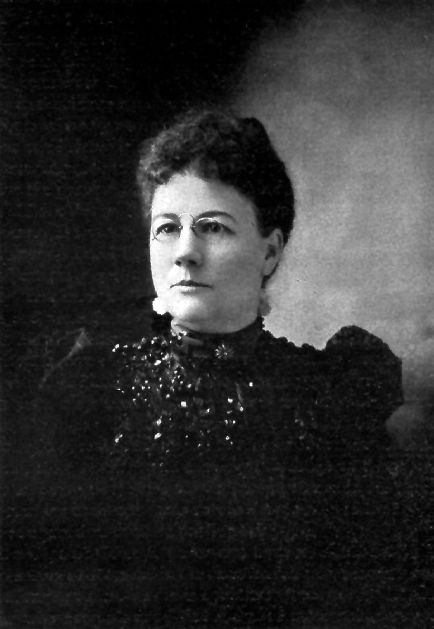
Ida Husted Harper

== See also ==
- List of suffragists and suffragettes
- List of women's rights activists
- Timeline of women's suffrage
- Women's suffrage organizations and publications
- Women's suffrage organizations
