= Suffragette Sally =

1911 novel by Gertrude Colmore

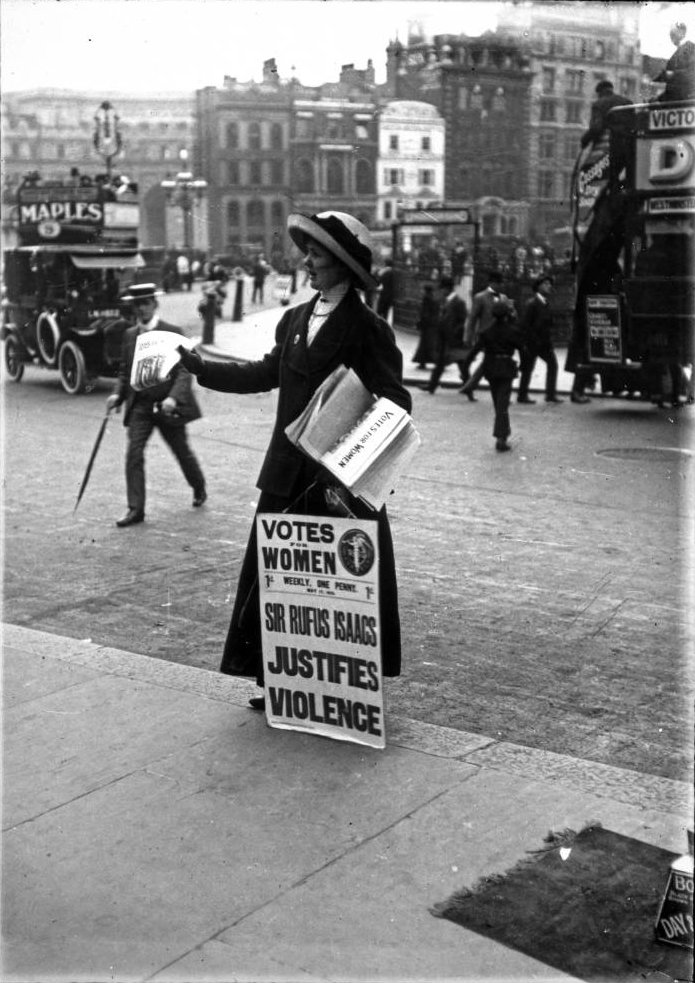
- Picture of a British suffragette used for cover of the Broadview edition
- Author: Gertrude Colmore (Getrude Baillie-Weaver)
- Language: English
- Genre: Political fiction Philosophical fiction
- Publisher: Stanley Paul and Co; Pandora; Broadview
- Publication date: 1911
- Publication place: United Kingdom
- Media type: Paperback (current edition)
- Pages: 375 pages (current edition, paperback)
- ISBN: 978-1-55111-474-3 (current edition, paperback)

Suffragette Sally is a suffrage novel by Gertrude Colmore i.e. Gertrude Baillie-Weaver (1855 – 1926) published in 1911. It is part of a string of novels written to further the cause of the women’s movement by gaining empathy from its readers. Following its three female protagonists through the militant campaign of the Women’s Social and Political Union, the novel examines both gender and class. The novel references many historic events and people, both by their known aliases and their real names.

== Publication and reception ==
Colmore’s novel was first published in 1911 by Stanley Paul and Co., London. At the time of publication the women’s movement had already been working and organizing for over 50 years. It was reviewed and advertised in the Suffrage newspaper Votes for Women and sold by the Women's Social and Political Union (WPSU) press.

'Gertrude Colmore' was the pen name for Gertrude Baillie-Weaver who also published The Life of Emily Davison in the same year.

Pandora republished it in 1984 under the title Suffragettes: A Story of Three Women. The Broadview Edition, released in 2007 and edited by Alison Lee, is intended for academic study, and uses the 1911 text together with Colmore’s original notes and with appendices on the women's suffrage movement.

== Plot summary ==
The novel mainly follows three women, Sally Simmonds, Edith Carstairs, and Geraldine Hill, and their involvement with the WSPU. Sally, a working class girl, attends a meeting where she hears Lady Hill speak and becomes entranced. Her quick conversion is contrasted to Edith Carstairs who undergoes a conversion from a polite Suffragist to a militant Suffragette. During the course of the novel Sally Simmonds risks everything she has: job, relationship, and life, enduring the hunger strike and subsequent abuse in prison. Edith navigates the social ramifications with outwardly charming Cyril Race, a deceptive politician. Lady Geraldine Hill does her part as an upperclass woman of title, disguising herself as a working class woman in order to participate in the hunger strike (having been released due to her title when she was previously incarcerated). The novel follows many historical events such as the hunger strike, Conciliation Bill, and Black Friday.

== Main characters ==
Sally Simmonds – A working class girl who is entranced by Lady Hill. She is a maid of all work at the home of the Bilkes family, whose patriarch is against suffrage and mock Sally upon discovering her affiliation. She is sent to Mrs. Carleton’s Home of Rest for Working Women and Girls where she becomes deeply involved with the movement, leaving her job and boyfriend to work for the WSPU. She is caught during a riot and sent to prison where she participates in the hunger strike and is forcibly fed and beaten. She embodies the WSPU motto, "Deeds not Words".

Edith Carstairs – a middle class girl who becomes involved in the suffrage movement with her mother. She draws an important distinction between suffragists – who support the cause, and suffragettes who are militant and "unwomanly". She undergoes a conversion, seeing the necessity of militancy after becoming involved with Lady Hill. She is fanciful, imagining fairies and fantasy heroes on the road with her, turning down an uninteresting suitor (who eventually becomes the doctor who force feeds Sally in prison) in favor of the charming and posh Cyril Race.

Lady Geraldine Hill – the wife of Lord Henry Hill and a leader of the militant suffragists. She works to further the cause by speech making, political networking, and social clout until she is arrested and quickly released because of her high standing. She then disguises her appearance to be treated as a working class girl and undergoes force feeding to tell the world what horrors are being enacted on women.

Lord Henry Hill – the husband of Geraldine who supports her suffrage involvement. After her time in prison he amends his original statement that he could only follow her 'so far', to encouraging her completely in her efforts.

Cyril Race – a handsome politician who shows romantic interest in Edith. However he cuts ties with her once she becomes a militant and eventually votes against the conciliation bill showing his true feelings.

Robbie Colquhoun – Edith’s friend from childhood who has been in love with her for years but does not earn her affection until she discovers he supports the suffrage cause.

Joe Whittle – Sally’s boyfriend who accompanies her to suffrage meetings but does not support the cause. Sally’s involvement becomes an irreconcilable difference between them, as he wants to get married and Sally does not. Sally is not overly hurt when he moves on.

Monty Cartairs – Edith’s brother who mocks the movement at first believing all militants to be unfeminine. He meets Lady Hill abroad and is taken aback by her grace and beauty believing her to be someone else. He attends a WSPU meeting to see her and is shocked to discover his companion is the women he had lambasted for being unwomanly. He then converts to the cause.

== Themes and historical content ==
The novel uses many real events both directly and indirectly. Many characters have real-life counterparts. Lady Geraldine Hill is meant to be Lady Constance Lytton, who disguises herself to experience forced feeding in prison. Christina Amherst is Christabel Pankhurst the daughter of Emmeline Pankhurst – leaders of the WSPU, and Annie Carney is Annie Kenney one of the women who interrupted the Liberal Party meeting to ask about women’s rights. Specific events such as Black Friday and the Conciliation Bills are also represented, at times mirroring Votes for Women or echoing speeches made by the real-life counterparts to characters.

The novel makes use of religious themes to create a conversion novel. Visceral experiences push Edith to revise her moral zeitgeist and social standards. The novel sets out to garner sympathy for the militant suffragettes by humanizing the movement and relating in a sentimental writing style already familiar to her readers. The novel combines sentimentalism and realism to contrast the women’s lives before and after involvement with the suffrage movement.

== See also ==
- Women's suffrage organizations and publications
