= List of women's suffrage organizations =

== Women's suffrage organizations ==
=== International ===
- British Dominions Women's Suffrage Union – founded in New Zealand as an organisation for the suffrage groups of the British colonies. Among its members were New Zealand, Australia, South Africa and Canada, active from 1913 to 1922
- International Alliance of Women – founded in 1904 to promote women's suffrage.
- Woman's Christian Temperance Union – active in the suffrage movement, especially in the U.S. and New Zealand.

=== Australia ===
- Victorian Women's Suffrage Society – founded in 1884, the local suffrage organisation of Victoria and the first suffrage organisation in Australia.
- Women's Suffrage League – founded in 1888, spearheaded the campaign for women's right to vote in South Australia.

=== Belgium ===
- Ligue belge du droit des femmes (Belgian League for the Rights of Women), founded 1892, concerned with voting rights from 1912.
- Union des femmes de Wallonie – Belgian organization founded in 1912 for women in the French-speaking province of Wallonia.

=== Brazil ===
- Federação Brasileira pelo Progresso Feminino (FBPF) – founded in 1922.

=== Bulgaria ===
- Bulgarian Women's Union (Bulgarskiat Zhenski Suyut) – active from 1901 to 1944.

=== Canada ===
- Canadian Women's Suffrage Association – founded 1877, name changed in 1883 to Toronto Women's Suffrage Association.

=== China ===
- Nüzi canzheng tongmenghui (Women's Suffrage Alliance) – founded in 1912

=== Cuba ===
- Club Femenino de Cuba – founded in 1917

=== Denmark ===
- Dansk Kvindesamfund (Danish Women's Society), founded 1871.
- Danske Kvindeforeningers Valgretsforbund (Danish Women's Society's Suffrage Union) – founded in 1898.
- Kvindelig Fremskridtsforening (Women's Progress Association), 1885–1893.
- Kvindevalgretsforeningen (Women's Suffrage Association), active from 1889–1898.
- Landsforbundet for Kvinders Valgret (National Association for Women's Suffrage), active from 1907–1915.

=== Egypt ===
- Egyptian Feminist Union – founded 1923, Egyptian organisation that fought for women's suffrage

=== Finland ===
- Suomen Naisyhdistys or Finsk kvinnoförening (Finnish Women's Organization), founded 1884.
- Naisasialiitto Unioni – founded 1892, Finnish arm of the International Alliance of Women

=== France ===
- Fédération Française des Sociétés Féministes (French Federation of Feminist Societies), 1891–1893.
- French Union for Women's Suffrage (Union française pour le suffrage des femmes, UFSF), 1909–1940.
- Ligue Française pour le Droit des Femmes (French League for Women's Rights), 1882–1950s.

=== Germany ===
- Deutscher Verband für Frauenstimmrecht (German Union for Women's Suffrage), 1902–1919.

=== Greece ===
- Greek League for Women's Rights (Σύνδεσμος για τα Δικαιώματα της Γυναίκας), founded 1920.

=== Guatemala ===
- Guatemalan Feminine Pro-Citizenship Union (Unión Femenina Guatemalteca Pro-ciudadanía)

=== Hungary ===
- Feministák Egyesülete (Feminist Association), active from 1904–1942.

=== Iceland ===
- Icelandic Women's Rights Association (Kvenréttindafélag Íslands), founded 1907.

=== Iran ===
- Democratic Organization of Iranian Women, founded 1943.
- New Path Society, founded 1955
- Women's party of Iran, founded 1942

=== Iraq ===
- Iraqi Women's League, founded 1952.

=== Ireland ===
- Dublin Women's Suffrage Association – major Irish organization.
- Irish Women's Franchise League – founded in 1908, more radical than the Dublin Association.
- Irish Women's Suffrage Society – founded by Isabella Tod as the North of Ireland Women's Suffrage Society in 1872, it was based in Belfast but had branches in other parts of the north.

=== Italy ===
- Associazione per la donna – early Italian organization founded in 1896 with an emphasis on defending women's rights.

=== Japan ===
- Fusen Kakutoku Dōmei (League for Women's Suffrage).
- Shin-fujin kyо̄kai (New Women's Association) – founded in 1919

=== Jordan ===
- Arab Women's Federation – founded in 1954

=== Lebanon ===
- Lebanese Women's Council – founded in 1952

=== Liechtenstein ===
- Komitée für das Frauenstimmrecht – founded in 1969

=== Liberia ===
- National Liberian Women's Social and Political Movement – founded in 1920 and campaigned without success for women's suffrage
- Liberian Women's Social and Political Movement – founded in 1946 and gained limited suffrage for the privileged Libero-American elite then universal women's suffrage

=== Lithuania ===
- Lithuanian Women's Association (Lietuvos moterų susivienijimas), active 1905.

=== Malta ===
- Women of Malta Association – founded 1944

=== Netherlands ===
- Vereeniging voor Vrouwenkiesrecht – active from 1894 to 1919.
- Nederlandsche Bond voor Vrouwenkiesrecht – active from 1907 to 1920.

=== New Zealand ===
- Women's Christian Temperance Union of New Zealand – led the petition campaign that successfully led in 1893 to the first self-governing nation to grant woman suffrage.

=== Norway ===
- Kvindestemmeretsforeningen (Women's Voting Rights Association), active from 1885–1913.
- Norwegian Association for Women's Rights, Norsk Kvinnesaksforening, founded 1884.
- National Association for Women's Suffrage (Landskvinnestemmerettsforeningen) – Norwegian organization from 1898 to 1913.

=== Poland ===
- Polish Women's League (Liga Kobiet Polskich), founded 1913.

=== Portugal ===
- League of Republican Women (Liga das Mulheres Republicanas), founded 1909.

=== Russia ===
- League for Women's Equality (Всероссийская лига равноправия женщин), 1907–1917
- Union for Women's Equality (Всероссийский союз равноправия женщин), 1905–1917

=== South Africa ===
- Women's Enfranchisement Association of the Union – founded 1911

=== Spain ===
- Asociación Nacional de Mujeres Españolas – 1918 to 1936.

=== Syria ===
- Union of Women's Societies in Damascus, founded in 1933

=== Sweden ===
- Fredrika Bremer Association (Fredrika Bremer Förbundet), founded 1884
- Gothenburg's Women's Association (Göteborgs Kvinnoförening), 1884–1891
- National Association for Women's Suffrage (Landsföreningen för kvinnans politiska rösträtt) – Swedish organization from 1902 to 1921

=== Switzerland ===
- Association internationale des femmes (International Association of Women), Geneva, 1868–1872

=== The Bahamas ===
- Women's Suffrage Movement, founded in 1951.

=== Turkey ===
- Türk Kadinlar Birligi – main suffrage organization in Turkey, founded 1924

=== United Kingdom ===
- Actresses' Franchise League – founded 1908
- Adult Suffrage Society – founded in 1906, supporters known as 'adultists'
- The Catholic Women's Suffrage Society – founded in 1911
- Church League for Women's Suffrage – founded in 1913
- Free Church League for Women's Suffrage – founded in 1910
- Gymnastic Teachers' Suffrage Society – founded in 1909
- Jewish League for Woman Suffrage – founded in 1912, thought to be the only Jewish suffrage group in the world.
- National Society for Women's Suffrage – Britain's first large suffrage organization, founded in 1867 by Lydia Becker.
- National Union of Women's Suffrage Societies – founded in 1897
- Suffrage Atelier – artists' collective campaigning for women's suffrage.
- Women's Franchise League – major British group created in 1889 by Emmeline Pankhurst.
- Women's Freedom League – British group founded in 1907 by 70 members of the Women's Social and Political Union in a breakaway following rules changes by Christabel Pankhurst.
- Women's Social and Political Union – militant organisation campaigning for women's suffrage, founded in 1903 (breakaway from the National Union for Women's Suffrage)

==== England ====
- Liverpool Women's Suffrage Society
- Manchester Society for Women's Suffrage
- Oxford Society for Women's Suffrage

==== Scotland ====
- Edinburgh National Society for Women's Suffrage
- Glasgow and West of Scotland Association for Women's Suffrage
- Orcadian Women's Suffrage Society – based in Orkney.
- Scottish Federation of Women's Suffrage Societies – founded 1910
- Shetland Women's Suffrage Society

=== United States ===
- Alpha Suffrage Club – believed to be the first black women's suffrage association in the United States, it began in Chicago, Illinois in 1913 under the initiative of Ida B. Wells-Barnett and Belle Squire.
- American Equal Rights Association – from 1866 to 1869, early attempt at a national organization by Lucy Stone, Susan B. Anthony and others.
- American Woman Suffrage Association – American suffrage organization formed in 1869 by Lucy Stone and Antoinette Brown Blackwell after a split in the American Equal Rights Association. It joined the National American Woman Suffrage Association (NAWSA) in 1890.
- College Equal Suffrage League – U.S. group founded in 1900 by Maud Wood Park and Inez Haynes Irwin to attract younger women to the movement. Merged with NAWSA in 1908.
- Congressional Union – radical U.S. organization formed in 1913 to campaign for a constitutional amendment for women's voting rights. Led by Alice Paul and Lucy Burns, In 1915 changed its name to National Woman's Party.
- Equal Franchise Society – created and joined by American women of wealth, a politically active organization conducted within a socially comfortable milieu.
- Leslie Woman Suffrage Commission, formed by Carrie Chapman Catt in March 1917 using funds willed for the purpose by Miriam Leslie. The commission, based in New York City, promoted woman's suffrage by educating the public and was affiliated with NAWSA.
- The Men's League, formed by Oswald Garrison Villard with Max Eastman. Also known as the Men's Equal Suffrage League, Men's League for Woman Suffrage and the National Men's League for Woman Suffrage.
- National American Woman Suffrage Association (NAWSA) – formed in 1890 by the joining of the American Woman Suffrage Association and the National Woman Suffrage Association.
- National Woman's Party – major United States organization founded in 1915 by Alice Paul and Lucy Burns to campaign for a constitutional amendment. Organized the Silent Sentinels. From 1913 to 1915 the same core group's name was the Congressional Union.
- National Women's Rights Convention – a series of major U.S. organizing conventions, held from 1850 to 1869.
- National Woman Suffrage Association – American organization founded in 1869 by Susan B. Anthony and Elizabeth Cady Stanton after the split in the American Equal Rights Association, joined NAWSA in 1890.
- New England Woman Suffrage Association (NEWSA) – formed in 1868 as the first major political organization with women's suffrage as its goal, active until 1920, principal leaders were Julia Ward Howe and Lucy Stone, played key role in forming the American Woman Suffrage Association.
- Silent Sentinels – Members of the National Woman's Party who picketed America's White House from January 1917 to June 1919 during Woodrow Wilson's presidency and until the 19th Amendment was passed, initiated and led by Alice Paul.
- Southern States Woman Suffrage Conference – group dedicated to winning voting rights for white women
- Woman's Christian Temperance Union – active in the suffrage movement, especially in the US and created the World WCTU which sent missionaries around the world, including to New Zealand
- Women's Trade Union League – American organization formed in 1903, later involved with the campaign for the 19th amendment.

==== California ====
- California Equal Suffrage Association

==== Indiana ====
- Indiana Woman's Suffrage Association – founded in 1852 to help women gain the right to vote.

==== Massachusetts ====
- Boston Equal Suffrage Association for Good Government – an American organization devoted to women's suffrage in Massachusetts, it was active from 1901 to 1920.

==== New York ====
- Woman Suffrage Party – inclusive New York suffrage party founded by Carrie Chapman Catt.

== See also ==
- List of suffragists and suffragettes
- List of women's suffrage publications
- Timeline of women's suffrage
- Timeline of first women's suffrage in majority-Muslim countries
- Women's suffrage in Australia
- Women's suffrage in Japan
- Women's suffrage in New Zealand
- Women's suffrage in the United Kingdom
- Women's suffrage in the United States
- Open Christmas Letter
- Seneca Falls Convention
- Suffrage Hikes
- Swimming suffragists
