= H. Baillie-Weaver =

English barrister and animal welfare campaigner (1861–1926)

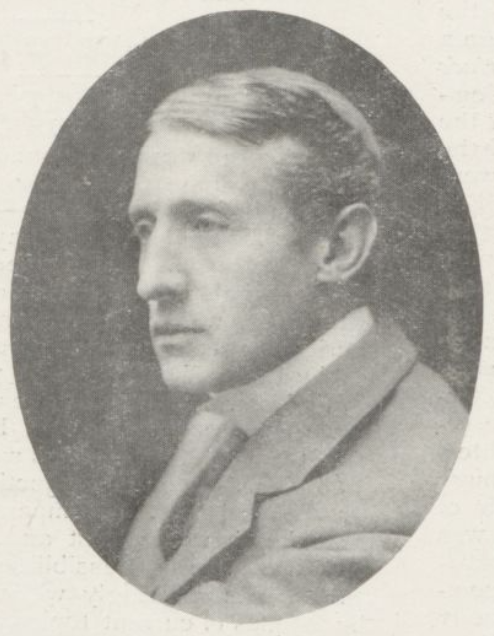
- Baillie-Weaver in 1914
- Born: Harold Baillie-Weaver; 1861; Yorkshire, England
- Died: 18 March 1926 (aged 65); Wimbledon, England
- Education: University of London (LL.B)
- Occupations: Barrister, activist
- Spouse: Gertrude Baillie-Weaver (m. 1901)

Harold Baillie-Weaver (1861 – 18 March 1926) was an English barrister, Theosophist and animal welfare campaigner. He co-founded the National Council for Animals' Welfare in 1922 with his wife Gertrude Baillie-Weaver.

== Biography ==
Baillie-Weaver was born in Yorkshire. He was the only son of Henry Edward Weaver. He studied law at the University of London where he graduated LL.B and was accepted as a student of the Inner Temple in 1885. He was called to the Bar by Lincoln's Inn on 28 January 1889.

He married Gertrude Baillie-Weaver in 1901. Baillie-Weaver was a member of the Men's League for Women's Suffrage. He was general secretary of the Theosophical Society from 1916 to 1921 and was chairman of the European Theosophical Federation. Baillie-Weaver was a member of the Order of the Star in the East and Order of Universal Co-Freemasonry. He was a pacifist and chairman of the Peace Council.

Baillie-Weaver was a member of the Animal Defence and Anti-Vivisection Society, National Canine Defence League, and Our Dumb Friends' League. He authored a pamphlet, Horses in Warfare (1912) with Ernest Bell which expressed concerns about the welfare of horses in the Second Boer War and called for an extension of the Geneva convention to include them. Baillie-Weaver was a vegetarian for ethical and spiritual reasons, believing that meat eating was an outrage to the Fatherhood of God, thus morally indefensible. In 1914, he was a speaker at a Vegetarian Society meeting in Cheltenham.

Baillie-Weaver and his wife lived in Newport, Essex where she was local secretary of National Canine Defence League and Our Dumb Friends' League. He met Jiddu Krishnamurti in 1915 and took him under his wing. Krishnamurti resided with Baillie-Weaver and his wife at their house in Wimbledon. In 1921, Baillie-Weaver was president of the Theosophical Fraternity in Education conference in Calais.

== National Council for Animals' Welfare ==
Baillie-Weaver and his wife founded the National Council for Animals' Welfare in 1922. Baillie-Weaver and his wife also instigated the Animal Welfare Week. In 1930, The Animals' Friend magazine was published by the National Council for Animals' Welfare in London. The editors in the 1940s were Yvonne A. M. Stott and J. Leonard Cather. The magazine was supportive of anti-vivisection and vegetarianism. In 1935, notable members of the organisation were Clare Annesley, Yvonne Arnaud, Robert H. Spurrier, Commander John Leonard Cather, J. Morewood Dowsett, Bertram Lloyd, H. V. Morton, Bindon Blood, D. Jeffrey Williams, Laurence Housman and Desmond Shaw. The organisation registered as a charity in 1964 and disbanded in 1983.

Copies of The Animal's Friend are archived in the Animal Rights and Animal Welfare Pamphlets Collection at the Special Collections Research Center in NC State University Libraries.

== Death ==
Baillie-Weaver was in ill health for a year before his death at the age of 65 on 18 March 1926 at his residence in Wimbledon. An obituary described him as "kindly, generous, courteous and the soul of chivalry. His splendid personality influenced all who came within his ken, and all those who knew him felt inspired and uplifted in his presence". His funeral was held at Golders Green Crematorium on 22 March.

A "Protecting the Defenceless" bronze statue sculptured by Charles Leonard Hartwell in 1931 in memory of Baillie-Weaver and his wife is located in the gardens of St John's Lodge, London.
