= Leslie Woman Suffrage Commission =

The Leslie Woman Suffrage Commission was an American woman's suffrage organization formed by Carrie Chapman Catt in March 1917 in New York City, based on funds willed for the purpose by publisher Miriam Leslie. The organization helped promote the cause of suffrage through increasing awareness of the issue and through education.

It established a 25-person press bureau that provided materials to newspapers across the country on this issue. This bureau also developed and distributed pamphlets to identify candidates for office who opposed women's suffrage. It was estimated that around $933,728.88 of the funds left by Leslie went directly to the cause of women's suffrage. The commission was dissolved in 1929, after passage of the 19th Amendment that enfranchised women. They voted for the first time in a presidential election in 1920.

== About ==
When Miriam Leslie died in 1914, she stipulated in her will that Carrie Chapman Catt should be a residual legatee, and receive money to promote and continue her work towards woman's suffrage. Leslie wanted Catt to decided how best to use the money. The will was contested by Leslie's family. Catt found a lawyer who would take the case on a contingency basis, willing to wait for payment until the case was won. The court awarded Catt $500,000 from Leslie's will in February 1917. Later, jewels belonging to Leslie and appraised at $34,785 were also given to Catt.

She organized the Leslie Woman Suffrage Commission from a meeting with suffrage leaders in New York in March 1917. The commission was headed by Catt and the secretary and treasurer was Gratia Goller. At the first meeting the women created by-laws for the organization. They also discussed how to use the $500,000 that Catt was given.

The commission promoted woman's suffrage by educating the public on this issue; it was affiliated with the National American Woman Suffrage Association (NAWSA). Rose Young was tasked with creating a bureau for the Leslie Commission to provide frequent press-releases to newspapers about the work of suffragists in the United States. The bureau was staffed with 25 people and was located in New York City on the fifteenth floor of a building at 171 Madison Avenue. The bureau also compiled statistics relating to suffrage, answered questions from the public, printed interviews with suffragists, and ways to challenge anti-suffragists. The Leslie Commission bureau also supported the publishing of The Woman Citizen journal. The group also created informational pamphlets for distribution in political races with candidates who opposed women having the vote. According to the Arizona Republic in 1920, the Leslie Commission had the "world's largest propaganda bureau run by women."

After the 19th Amendment to the US Constitution was passed, women first voted in a presidential election in 1920. The Leslie Commission worked to support women's suffrage movements in other countries. It also purchased books about the history of women's suffrage and donated them to public libraries in the United States. The commission was dissolved by its board on October 1, 1929.

== Notable members ==
- Alice Stone Blackwell
- Carrie Chapman Catt
- Mary Garrett Hay
- Anna Pennybacker
- Margaret Drier Robins
- Harriet Taylor Upton

== See also ==
- List of suffragists and suffragettes
- Women's suffrage in the United States
- Women's suffrage organizations and publications
