= Winnifred Harper Cooley =

American author and lecturer

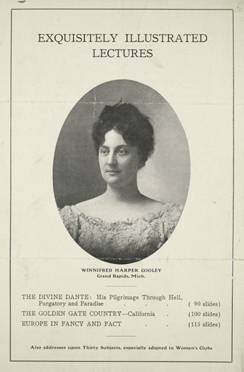
- Advertisement for Cooley's 1893 lecture series
- Born: October 2, 1874; Terre Haute, Indiana
- Died: October 20, 1967
- Occupation(s): Author and lecturer
- Notable work: The New Womanhood

Winnifred Harper Cooley (October 2, 1874 – October 20, 1967) was an American author and lecturer.

== Early life ==
Born in Terre Haute, Indiana, she was the daughter of Ida Husted Harper.

Cooley graduated in 1896 with an A.B. in Ethics from Stanford University.

== Personal life ==
In 1899, she married George Elliot Cooley, a Unitarian minister. The couple lived in Vermont and Michigan before finally settling in New York City. Cooley was widowed in 1926.

== Professional life ==
Cooley was a prolific writer. Her best known work is The New Womanhood (1904). In The New Womanhood, Cooley lists the achievements of the New Woman as 1- education (lower, higher, professional), 2- employment (industrial, commercial), and 3- recognition (legal and civil).

In "The Younger Suffragists" (1913), Cooley distinguishes herself and the "younger feminists" from the "older suffragists" and their idea that gaining the ballot will change the world for women. Although the term would become widespread in the 1960s and 1970s, only a small group of women called themselves feminists in the early 20th century. Cooley was among this first generation of self-proclaimed feminists. According to Cooley, "A feminist is always a suffragist, but a suffragist is not always a feminist." Cooley saw the suffragists as more conservative than the broader outlooked feminists. For feminists, suffrage was a path to complete social revolution.

Beginning in 1923, Cooley hosted a biweekly dinner forum facetiously called "The Morons" which drew as many as 300 attendees.
