= Free Church League for Women's Suffrage =

The Free Church League for Women’s Suffrage was a British nonconformist Christian organisation associated with the women's suffrage movement in the United Kingdom.

== History ==
The Free Church League for Women’s Suffrage was founded in 1910. In 1913, the League supported the "National Week of Prayer" organised by religious suffrage leagues, including The Catholic Women's Suffrage Society and the Jewish League for Woman Suffrage.

On 1 April 1913, the League began publication of The Free Church Suffrage Times (FCST). The first editorial of the newspaper outlined the aims of the Free Church League for Women's Suffrage:

"This league stands for the advocacy of the enfranchisement of women on the same basis that men are, or shall be enfranchised, believing the present system of government by one sex only to be un-Christian in principle, unjust in practice and indefensible from an economic or religious standpoint."

There were local branches of the League, such as in Penge, London, where a preacher emphasised "the spiritual side of the emancipation of women."

== Notable members ==
- Rev. Hatty Baker
- Edith Pickworth
- L. E. Turquand

== See also ==
- Timeline of women's suffrage
- Women's suffrage organisations
