= The Free Church Suffrage Times (newspaper) =

- Categories: Newspaper
- Frequency: Monthly
- Publisher: Unknown
- Founded: 1913
- First issue: 1 April 1913
- Final issue Number: 77
- Country: United Kingdom of Great Britain and Ireland
- Based in: London
- Language: English

The Free Church Suffrage Times (FCST) was a British nonconformist Christian newspaper associated with the women's suffrage movement. It also advocated for women's participation in the life and ministry of the nonconformist churches. It was succeeded by The Coming Day in 1916.

== History ==
The Free Church Suffrage Times was first issued in April 1913. It was published in London. by an unknown publisher, and was associated the nonconformist Christian Free Church League for Women's Suffrage.

The first editorial of the newspaper outlined the aims of the Free Church League for Women's Suffrage:

"This league stands for the advocacy of the enfranchisement of women on the same basis that men are, or shall be enfranchised, believing the present system of government by one sex only to be un-Christian in principle, unjust in practice and indefensible from an economic or religious standpoint."

The Free Church Suffrage Times covered inter-faith initiatives, including the combined protest of religious suffrage societies against the forcible feeding of suffragette prisoners and the Cat and Mouse Act. It praised a speech delivered at an inter-faith meeting in July 1913 by Joseph Hochmann, Rabbi of the New West End Synagogue in Bayswater, London.

The newspaper continued publishing after the outbreak of World War I.

The newspaper was succeeded by The Coming Day in 1916, which ran until June 1920. The Coming Day was then succeeded by The New Day.

== See also ==
- List of British suffragists and suffragettes
- List of women's suffrage publications
