= Ida Husted Harper =

American suffragist and writer (1851–1931)

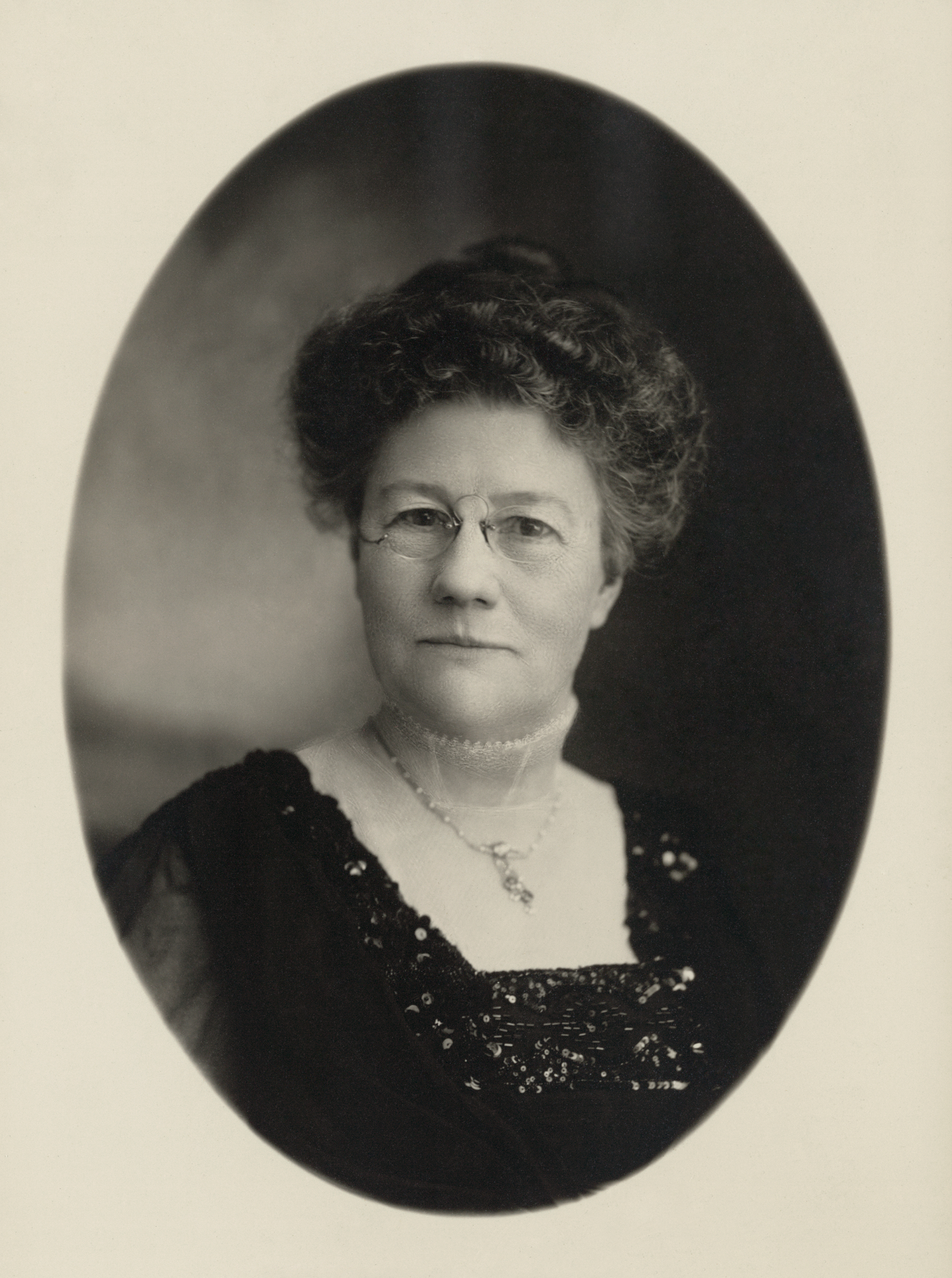
- Harper, c. 1910s
- Born: Ida A. Husted; February 18, 1851; Franklin County, Indiana, U.S.
- Died: March 14, 1931 (aged 80)
- Resting place: Muncie, Indiana
- Education: Muncie Central High School; Indiana University
- Occupations: author, journalist, suffragist
- Spouse: Thomas Winans Harper (m. 1871; div. 1890)
- Children: Winnifred Harper Cooley
- Writing career
- Language: English
- Genre: biographies
- Notable works: The Life and Work of Susan B. Anthony; History of Woman Suffrage, volume four (co-written with Susan B. Anthony), five, and six
- Literary movement: women's suffrage

Ida Husted Harper (February 18, 1851 – March 14, 1931) was an American author, journalist, columnist, and suffragist, as well as the author of a three-volume biography of suffrage leader Susan B. Anthony at Anthony's request. Harper also co-edited and collaborated with Anthony on volume four (1902) of the six-volume History of Woman Suffrage and completed the project by solo writing volumes five and six (1922) after Anthony's death. In addition, Harper served as secretary of the Indiana chapter of the National Woman Suffrage Association, became a prominent figure in the women's suffrage movement in the U.S., and wrote columns on women's issues for numerous newspapers across the United States. Harper traveled extensively, delivered lectures in support of women's rights, handled press relations for a women's suffrage amendment in California, headed the National American Woman Suffrage Association's national press bureau in New York City and the editorial correspondence department of the Leslie Bureau of Suffrage Education in Washington, D.C., and chaired the press committee of the International Council of Women.

== Early life and education ==
Ida A. Husted was born on February 18, 1851, in Fairfield Township, Franklin County, Indiana. "Of New England parentage", she was the eldest of Cassandra (Stoddard) and John Arthur Husted's three children. Her religious affiliation was Unitarian.

Around 1861, when Husted was about ten years old, the family moved to Muncie, Indiana, in search of better schools. "She showed in childhood a remarkable memory and marked literary talent. Her education was almost wholly received in private schools," although she graduated in from Muncie High School, a local public school. Husted entered Indiana University in Bloomington, Indiana, enrolling as a sophomore, but left in 1869 to become an educator and high school principal in Peru, Indiana.

== Marriage and family ==
On December 28, 1871, Husted married Thomas Winans Harper (1847–1908), a University of Michigan law school graduate and an American Civil War veteran from Ohio. The couple established their home in Terre Haute, Indiana, where he practiced law, was elected city attorney in 1879, and served for nearly twenty years as the chief legal counsel for the Brotherhood of Locomotive Firemen, a railroad union established by Eugene V. Debs, a socialist leader who also lived in Terre Haute. At her initiative, Harper and her husband divorced in February 1890.

The Harpers had one child, a daughter named Winnifred. Like her mother, Winnifred Harper Cooley became a writer and journalist.

== Career ==
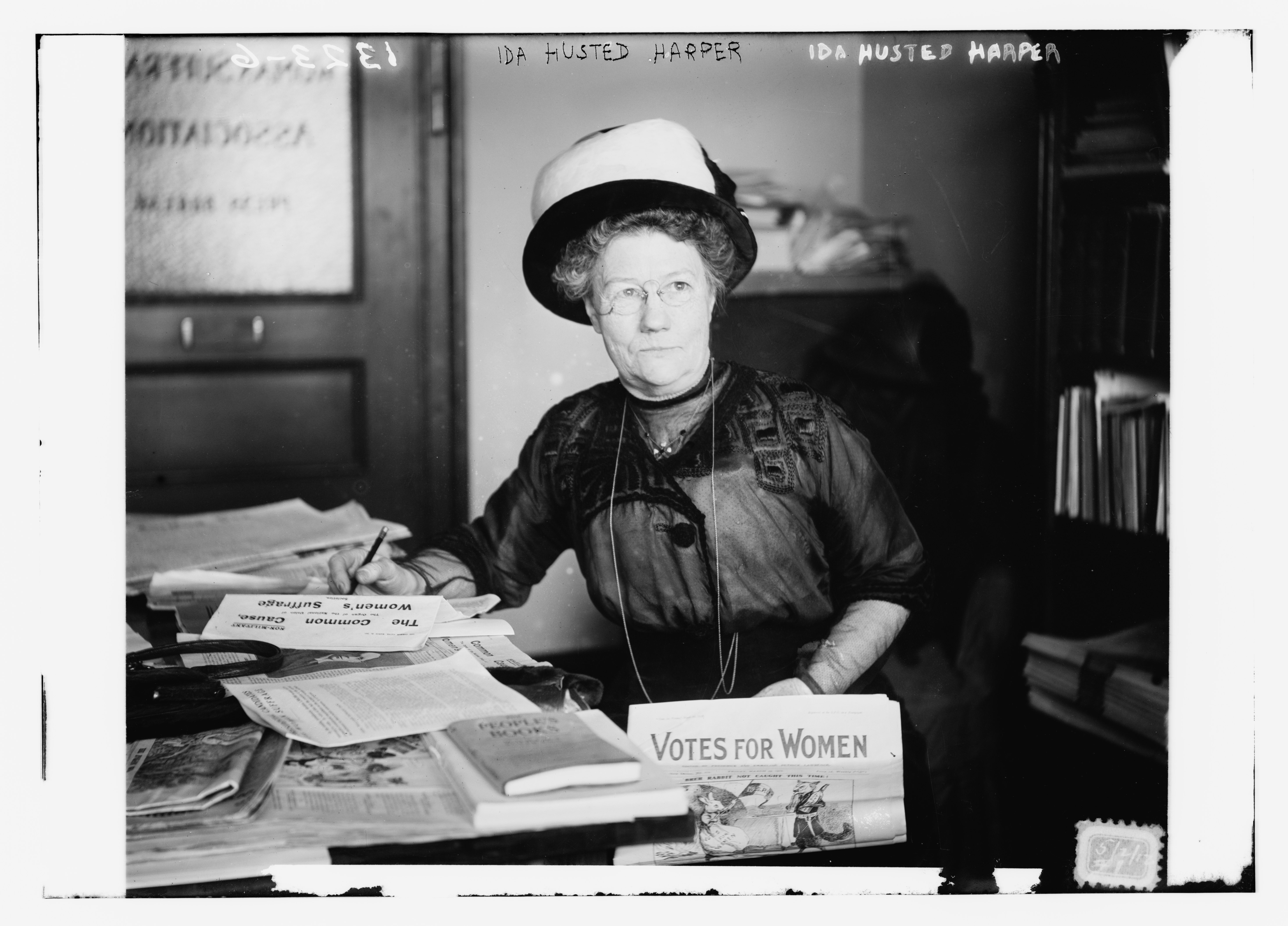
Ida Husted Harper

Harper began her prolific career as a journalist and women's suffrage advocate in Indiana. After securing a divorce in 1890 she later moved on to California, New York, and Washington, D.C., where she continued to write for newspapers across the country, deliver lectures in support of women's rights, and complete her major works, a three-volume biography, The Life and Work of Susan B. Anthony, and contributing to volumes four through six of the six-volume History of Woman Suffrage.

=== Indiana ===
Harper moved to Terre Haute, Indiana, with her husband after their marriage in 1871 and soon began her career as a journalist. Although her husband disapproved, she began writing articles for the Terre Haute Saturday Evening Mail, initially submitting her early articles in the early 1870s under the male pseudonym of "Mrs. John Smith." Her own name did not appear with her writings until September 1881. Harper's early writings also appeared in Indianapolis newspapers.

For thirteen years Harper wrote a column called "A Woman's Thoughts:, later named "A Woman's Opinions", for the Terre Haute Saturday Evening Mail that generally discussed traditional women's topics such as marriage, family, education, careers, food, and fashion, but her columns also discussed major issued such as temperance, women's rights, and women's suffrage. Harper's views on women's roles slowly evolved over time. Her writings often provided varied and conflicting views on marriage, household responsibilities, women in the workforce, and the value of education for women; however, she remained steadfast in her assertion that women had "the right to pursue whatever vocation in life she is best adapted for. . . ."

Harper met Susan B. Anthony, a leader of the National Woman Suffrage Association (NWSA), in 1878, when Debs sponsored Anthony's speech in Terre Haute. At that time the NWSA was one of two rival women's suffrage organizations that later merged into the National American Woman Suffrage Association under Anthony's leadership. The Harper and Anthony soon became friends and colleagues. From 1884 to 1893, at Debs's invitation, Harper also edited "The Woman's Department," a monthly column in Locomotive Firemen's Magazine, the house organ of the Brotherhood of Locomotive Firemen. In addition, Harper continued her advocacy for women's suffrage, including her election in 1887 as secretary of the Indiana chapter of the NWSA. In that capacity she coordinated thirteen district conventions in a drive to pass a statewide bill to allow women to vote in municipal elections.

In 1889 Harper was invited to take an editorial position at the Terre Haute Daily News. Two weeks after her divorce in 1890, she became the newspaper's managing editor, one of the first instance on record of a woman occupying the position of managing editor on a political daily paper. Although her service as editor-in-chief was brief, she led the newspaper through a lively municipal election. Harper and the newspaper successfully supported a bipartisan slate of reform candidates in the city election. During the campaign she wrote editorials and dictated the newspaper's positions, with each candidate on the bipartisan slate elected to office.

Harper resigned from the job in Terre Haute in May 1890 to move to Indianapolis to be with her daughter, Winnifred, who was attending the Girls' Classical School, a college preparatory school founded in 1881 by May Wright Sewall and her husband, Theodore Sewall. (May Wrigh Sewall, the school's principal, was also chair of the NWSA's executive committee.) While her daughter attended school, Harper worked for two years on the editorial staff of the Indianapolis News, a newspaper to which she continued to contribute long after her departure from Indiana.

=== California ===
By 1893 Harper had moved to California to join her daughter at Stanford University. Harper also enrolled at Stanford, but did not earn a degree. In 1896, while living in California she also joined the National American Woman Suffrage Association and became head of press relations for the NAWSA's campaign for a women's suffrage amendment in the state. The legislative effort failed, but Harper's friendship with Susan B. Anthony led to an invitation to assist Anthony with her writing. Anthony praised Harper's writing abilities, saying, "The moment I give the idea—the point—she formulates it into a good sentence—while I should have to haggle over it half an hour."

=== New York ===
In 1897 Anthony asked Harper to come to New York to write her official biography. Harper moved into Anthony's home in Rochester, New York, to sort through her papers and distill them into what eventually became a three-volume biography, The Life and Work of Susan B. Anthony. According to Harper's biography of Anthony, she found at Anthony's home "two large rooms filled, from floor to ceiling, with material of a personal and historical nature." In collaboration with Anthony, Harper published the first two volumes of the biography in 1898. Harper wrote the third volume, which was published in 1908, two years after Anthony's death. Harper also worked with Anthony to write and edit the fourth volume, published in 1902, of the six-volume History of Woman Suffrage. Harper was solo author of the fifth and sixth volumes, which were published in 1922.

Around the turn of the century Harper spent several years traveling extensively with Anthony, attending women's rights gatherings and delivering lectures. Harper also wrote for a large number of newspapers, including the Christian Union, Western Christian Advocate, Advance, Chicago Inter Ocean, Chicago Times, the Detroit Free Press," the Toledo Blade, the Boston Evening Traveller, The Cleveland Leader, the Indianapolis Journal and the Terre Haute Gazette and Express. Harper's weekly syndicated columns appeared in newspapers in several major cities, including Buffalo, New York; Chicago, Illinois; Indianapolis, Indiana; Philadelphia, Pennsylvania; and Washington, D.C. She also authored a woman's column in The New York Sun from 1899 to 1903 and a regular column titled "Votes for Women" for Harper's Bazaar from 1909 to 1913, which helped to make Harper a well-known name in as a newspaper columnist.

In addition to Harper's newspaper articles and lectures around the country, she became active in the International Council of Women, which Anthony had been instrumental in creating. From 1899 to 1902, Harper was chairwoman of the press committee of the ICW and wrote articles for International Suffrage News, which was published in Europe. In 1910 Harper became head of the NAWSA's national press bureau in New York City, supplying information and developing a market for articles about women's suffrage in magazines and newspapers around the country. She also testified in favor of women's suffrage before U.S. congressional committees.

=== Washington, D.C. ===
In 1916 Harper moved to Washington, D.C., to take charge of editorial correspondence at the Leslie Bureau of Suffrage Education (a part of the NAWSA's Leslie Woman Suffrage Commission) in and effort to improve public understanding of the women's suffrage movement and influence public opinion. Her department was responsible for responding to a steady stream of newspaper editorials about women's suffrage from all over the country, praising the editors when they supported suffrage and trying to answer their objections when they opposed it. The bureau's publicity contributed to the passage of the Nineteenth Amendment to the U.S. Constitution in 1919 that guarantees the right of women to vote. After the ratification of the Nineteenth Amendment, Harper completed writing the fifth and sixth volumes, published in 1922, of the History of Woman Suffrage.

== Later years ==
An active member of the American Association of University Women, she made her home in the last years of her life in that organization's headquarters building in Washington, D.C.

== Death and legacy ==
Harper died in Washington, D.C., on March 14, 1931, following a cerebral hemorrhage at the age of 80. Her remains are interred at Muncie, Indiana.

Harper's major legacy include the three-volume The Life and Work of Susan B. Anthony, her contributions to volumes four through six of the History of Woman's Suffrage, and the newspaper columns and magazine articles from the 1870s through the 1920s that outline her changing views on women's rights. Scholars familiar with Harper's life and work suggest that she was a product of her time, arguing that the contradictory content of her writings suggest Harper's views on women's rights evolved as she became more independent and active in the women's suffrage movement. Harper continued to pursue her career as a journalist despite her husband's objections. After she sought and secured a divorce at the age of thirty-nine, Harper struck out on her own, moved away from her long-time home in Indiana, and reestablished herself as a prolific writer and women's rights advocate in California, New York, and Washington, D.C.

The Archives and Manuscripts Division of the New York Public Library holds a collection of Harper's papers. Other collections of her newspaper articles and other related material are in the special collections of the Huntington Library at San Marino, California, and the Vigo County Public Library in Terre Haute, Indiana.

== Selected published works ==
=== Major works ===
- The Life and Work of Susan B. Anthony, three volumes (1898–1908)
- History of Woman Suffrage, edited volume four (1902), co-written with Susan B. Anthony; solo author of volumes five (1922) and six (1922).

=== Other ===
- The Associated Work of the Women of Indiana (1893)
- Suffrage a Right (1906)
- Woman Suffrage Throughout the World (1907)
- History of the Movement for Woman Suffrage in the United States (1907)
- How Six States Won Woman Suffrage (1912)
- Suffrage Snapshots (1915)
- A National Amendment for Woman Suffrage (1915)
- A Brief History of the Movement for Woman Suffrage in the United States (1917)
- Story of the National Amendment for Woman Suffrage (1919)
- Life of Dr. Anna Howard Shaw (1927)

== See also ==
- List of suffragists and suffragettes
- List of women's rights activists
- Timeline of women's suffrage
- Women's suffrage organizations
