= New Path Society =

Organization for women's rights in Iran

New Path Society (Jamʿīyat-e rāh-e now) was an organization for women's rights in Iran, founded in 1955.

== History ==
When the Shah returned to power in 1953, the women's movement became more active in Iran, and a number of women's groups were founded in the 1950s. The New Path Society (Jamʿīyat-e rāh-e now) was one of the most prominent of the many Iranian women's groups of the 1950s, which was a period of a very active, but also very fragmented women's movement.

The New Path Society was founded in 1955 by the first female ambassador of Iran, Mehrangīz Dawlatšāhī. The society provided women with different forms of social help and educational courses and opportunities. In 1956, there was a campaign for women's suffrage in Iran by the New Path Society, the Association of Women Lawyers (Anjoman-e zanān-e ḥoqūqdān) and the League of Women Supporters of Human Rights (Jamʿīyat-e zanān-e ṭarafdār-e ḥoqūq-e bašar). Women's suffrage was introduced by the 1963 Iranian referendum.

In 1967, the society participated in the creation of the Family Protection Law of 1967, which dramatically reformed women's rights in Iran.

== See also ==
- Women’s Organization of Iran
