= Alice Stone Blackwell =

American feminist, journalist and human rights advocate (1857–1950)

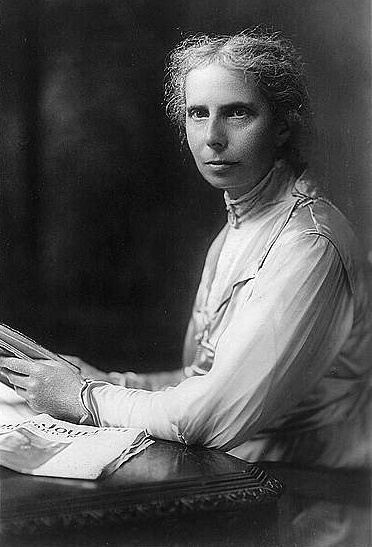
- Alice Stone Blackwell, between 1880 and 1900
- Born: September 14, 1857; Orange, New Jersey, US
- Died: March 15, 1950 (aged 92); Cambridge, Massachusetts, US
- Resting place: Forest Hills Cemetery, Boston, Massachusetts
- Education: Boston University
- Movement: Feminism; Radical socialism
- Parent(s): Lucy Stone; Henry Browne Blackwell

Signature
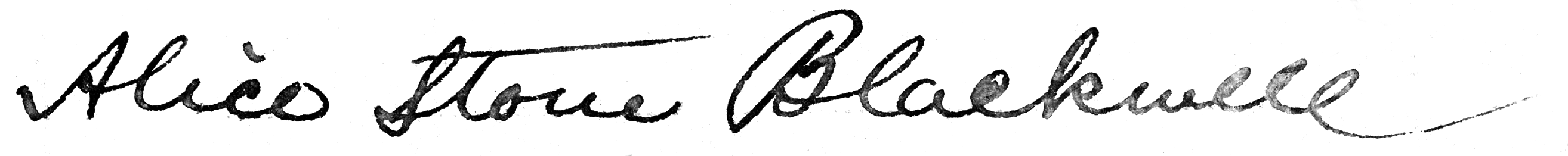

Alice Stone Blackwell (September 14, 1857 – March 15, 1950) was an American feminist, suffragist, journalist, radical socialist, and human rights advocate.

== Early life and education ==
Blackwell was born in East Orange, New Jersey to Henry Browne Blackwell and Lucy Stone, both of whom were suffrage leaders and helped establish the American Woman Suffrage Association (AWSA). She was also the niece of Elizabeth Blackwell, America's first female physician. Her mother introduced Susan B. Anthony to the women's rights movement and was the first woman to earn a college degree in Massachusetts, the first to keep her own last name after getting married, and the first to speak about women's rights full-time.

Blackwell was educated at the Harris Grammar School in Dorchester, the Chauncy School in Boston and Abbot Academy in Andover. She attended Boston University, where she was president of her class, and graduated in 1881, at age 24. She belonged to Phi Beta Kappa society.

== Career ==
Blackwell is well known for her work towards women's rights. At first resisting the cause of her mother and father, she later became a prominent reformer. After graduating from Boston University, Alice began working for the Woman's Journal, the paper started by her parents. By 1884, her name was alongside her parents on the paper's masthead. After her mother's death in 1893, Alice assumed almost sole editing responsibility of the paper.

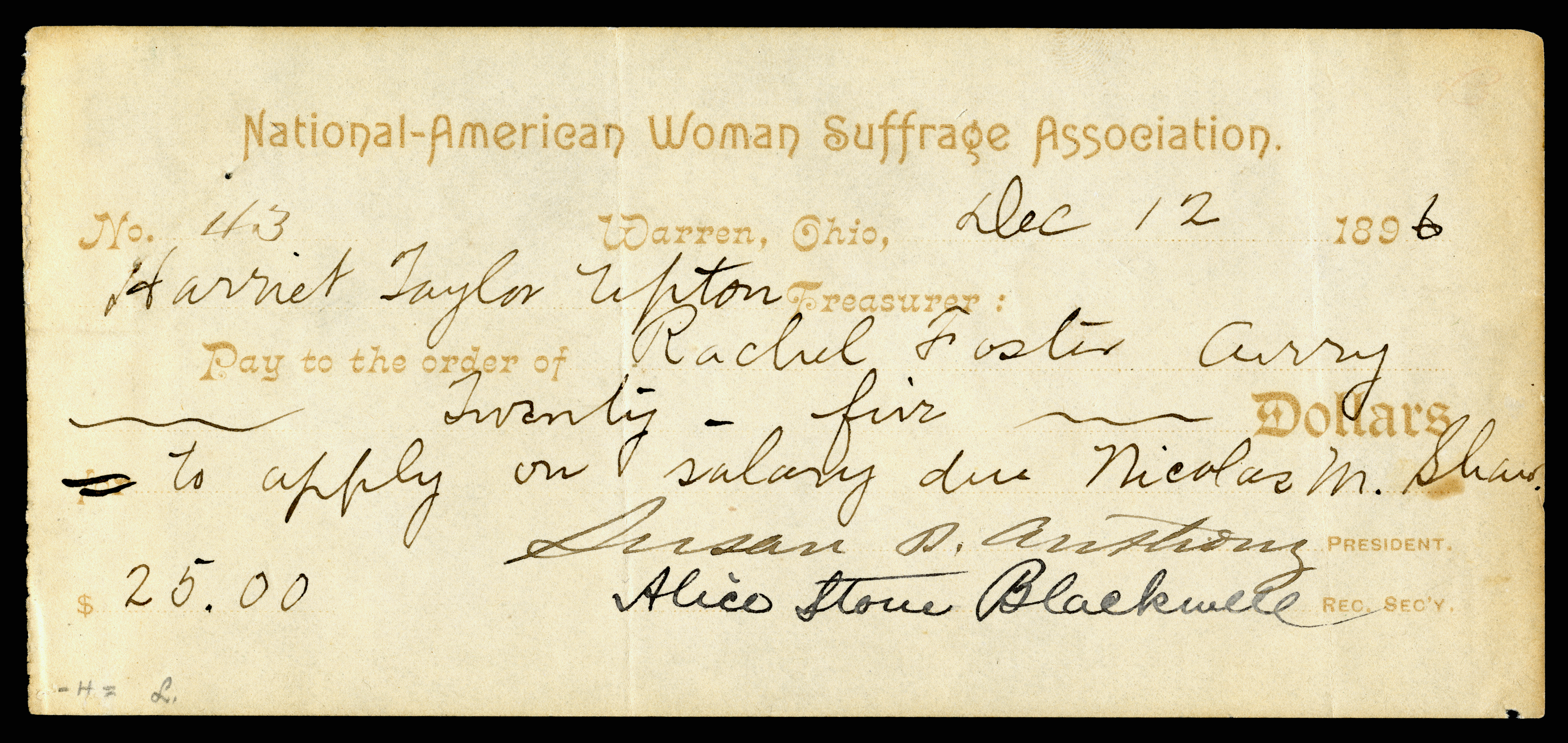
Susan B. Anthony and Alice Stone Blackwell signed NAWSA check, written by the group's treasurer Harriet Taylor Upton.

In 1890, she helped reconcile the American Woman Suffrage Association and National Woman Suffrage Association, two competing organizations in the women's suffrage movement, into the National American Woman Suffrage Association (NAWSA). The movement had become split in 1869 over disputes over the degree to which women's suffrage should be tied to African-American male suffrage. This split created the AWSA, which her parents helped organize, and the National Woman Suffrage Association (NWSA), headed by Susan B. Anthony and Elizabeth Cady Stanton. From 1890 to 1908, Alice Stone Blackwell was NAWSA's recording secretary and in 1909 and 1910 one of the national auditors. She was prominent in Woman's Christian Temperance Union activities. In 1903, she reorganized the Society of Friends of Russian Freedom in Boston.

She was also president of the New England and Massachusetts Woman Suffrage associations and honorary president of the Massachusetts League of Women Voters.

In later life, Blackwell went blind. She died March 15, 1950, at the age of ninety-two.

Her home in Uphams Corner is a site on the Boston Women's Heritage Trail.

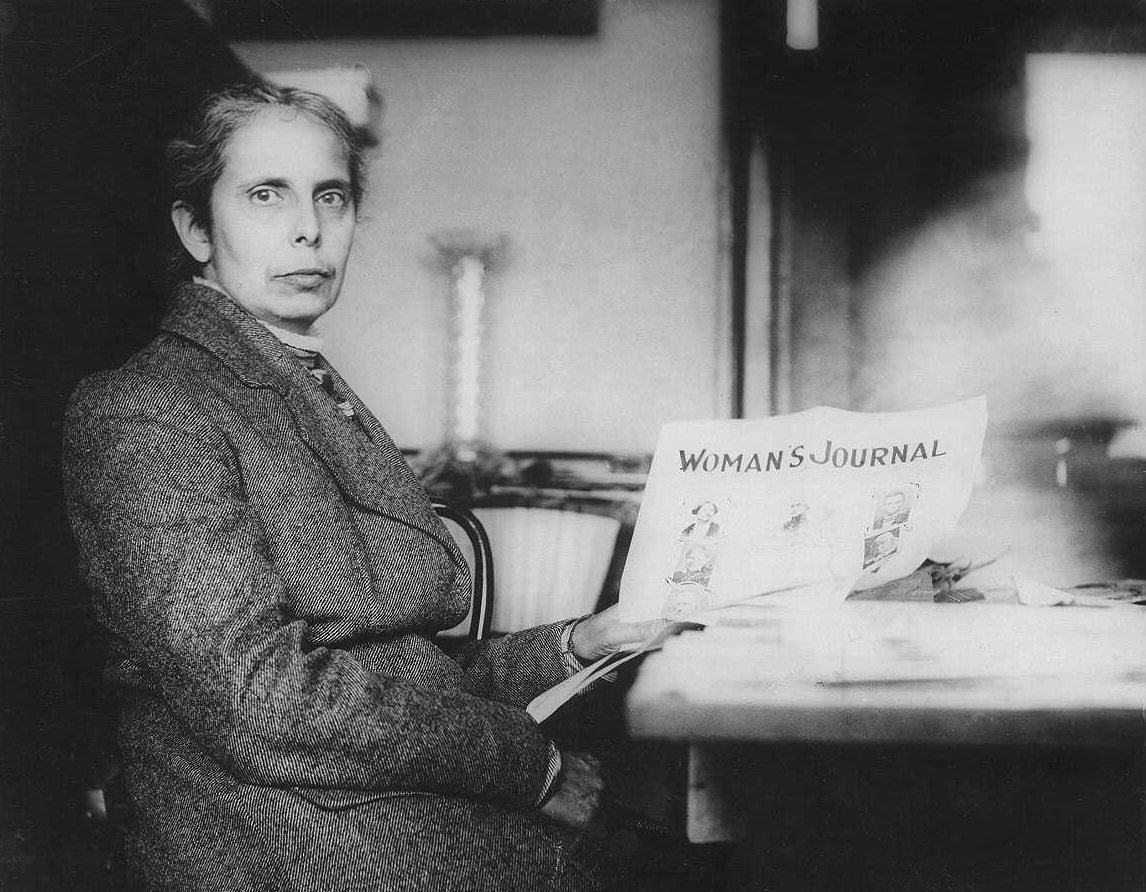
Blackwell holding a copy of Woman's Journal, around 1910.

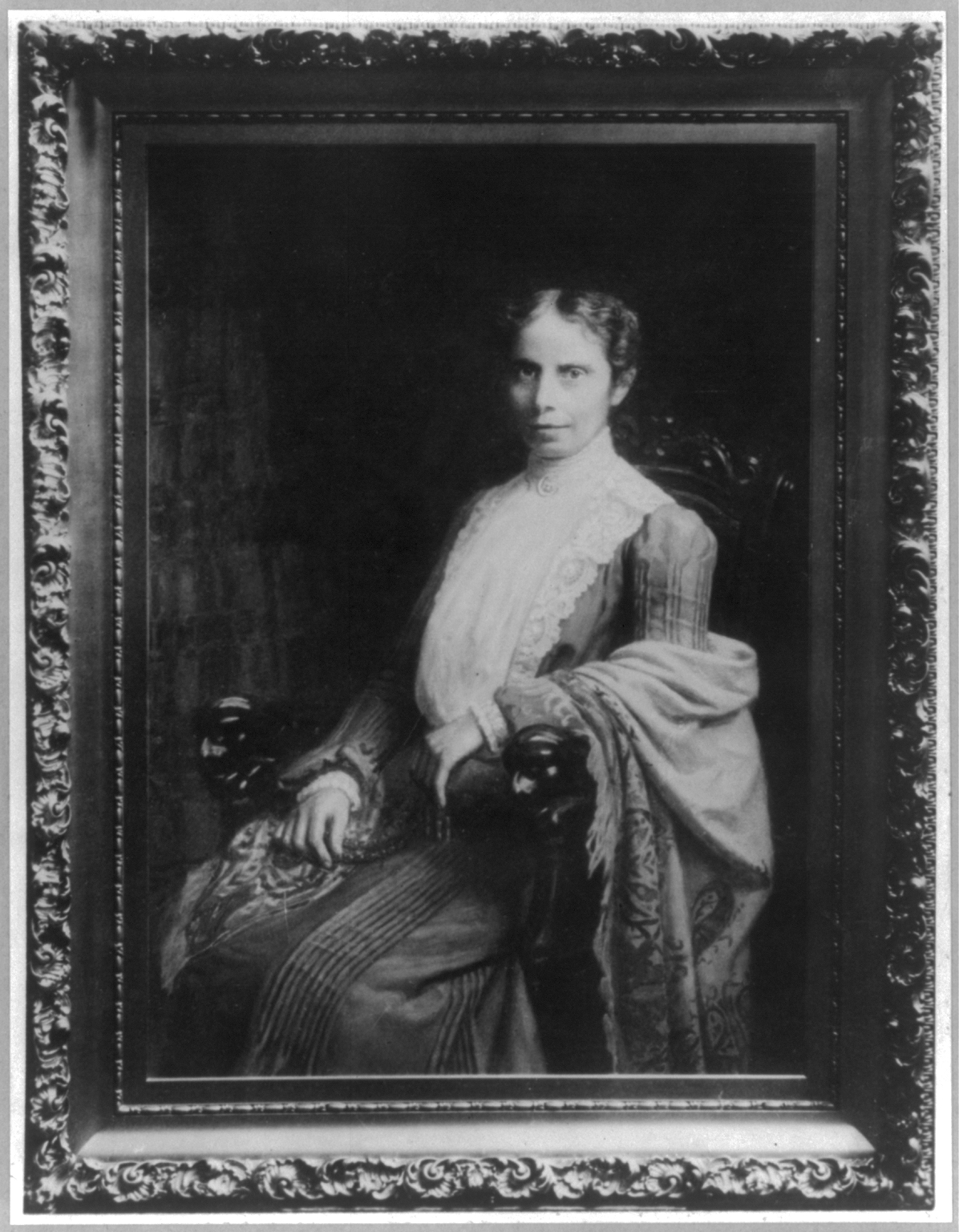
Alice Stone Blackwell

== Humanitarianism ==
Alice Stone Blackwell was also involved in humanitarian acts outside of the United States. In the 1890s, she traveled to Armenia, where she became passionately involved in the Armenian refugee community. She sold some of her possessions, particularly the oriental rugs from her house on Pope's Hill in Dorchester, to benefit the Armenians and feed their children, and she also provided assistance to adults looking for jobs. This is also when she discovered her interest in international literature. She translated many of the country's works into English in Armenian Poems (1896). She would continue translating literature into English, including works of Hungarian, Yiddish, Spanish, French, Italian, and Russian poetry.

== Publications ==
- Growing Up in Boston's Gilded Age: The Journal of Alice Stone Blackwell, 1872–1874
- Lucy Stone: Pioneer of Woman's Rights (published 1930, reprinted 1971)
- Some Spanish-American Poets translated by Alice Stone Blackwell (published 1929 by D. Appleton & Co.)
- Armenian Poems translated by Alice Stone Blackwell (1st vol., 1896; 2nd vol., 1917). OCLC 4561287.
- Songs of Russia (1906)
- Songs of Grief and Joy translated from the Yiddish of Ezekiel Leavitt (1908)

== See also ==
- List of suffragists and suffragettes
- List of women's rights activists
- Timeline of women's suffrage
- Timeline of women's rights (other than voting)
