= Gertrude Baillie-Weaver =

English suffragette and writer (1855–1926)

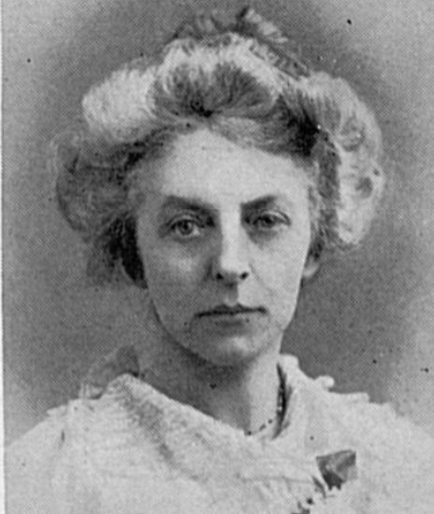
- Baillie-Weaver in 1909
- Born: Gertrude Renton; 8 June 1855; Kensington, London, England
- Died: 26 November 1926 (aged 71); Wimbledon, London, England
- Other name: Gertrude Colmore
- Occupations: Activist, writer
- Spouses: Henry Arthur Colmore Dunn (m. 1892; died 1896) Harold Baillie-Weaver (m. 1901; died 1926)

Gertrude Baillie-Weaver (née Renton; 8 June 1855 – 26 November 1926) was an English suffragette, Theosophist, Freemason and writer who published as Gertrude Colmore. She co-founded the National Council for Animals' Welfare and wrote in support of animal welfare and human rights. Her books about Suffragette Sally and Emily Wilding Davison were republished in the 1980s.

== Personal life ==
Gertrude Renton was born on 8 June 1855 in Kensington, London. Her parents were Elizabeth (née Leishman) and John Thomas Renton, a stockbroker. She had five older sisters. She was educated at Frankfurt am Main and worked as a governess in London and Paris.

In 1882, she married lawyer Henry Arthur Colmore Dunn, who died in 1896. In 1901, when she was in her forties, she married the barrister and theosophist Harold Baillie-Weaver, an advocate of animal welfare. Baillie-Weaver joined the London branch of the Theosophical Society in 1906. She was active in the Theosophical Order of Service and chairman of their League to Help the Woman's Movement. As with many British Theosophists of the time, she was also a Freemason in what was then called the Universal Order of Co-Masonry, which she found a source of order in a chaotic world.

== Activism and writing ==
Baillie-Weaver wrote under the pseudonyms Gertrude Colmore, Gertrude Renton Weaver and Mrs Gertrude Dunn. She published poetry, short stories and novels against vivisection and in support of theosophy and women's suffrage. Baillie-Weaver co-founded the National Council for Animals' Welfare with her husband in 1922. She was chairman of the National Council for Animals' Welfare Week which urged colleges, schools, churches and local committees to teach kindness to animals for a week.

In 1907 she published The Angel and the Outcast, a melodramatic novel regarding a Deptford slaughterhouse. The following year she published Priests of Progress, an anti-vivisection novel that was condemned by vivisectionists from the Research Defence Society. In 1908, she commented that the general public is "entirely ignorant of the horrors of vivisection". She served on the committee that managed Battersea General Hospital which was notably opposed to any experimentation using either animals or humans.

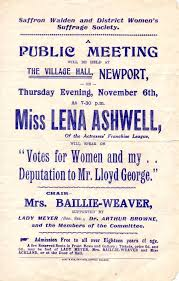
Saffrom Waldon suffragist Public-meeting

She supported women's suffrage by writing short stories for Votes for Women and The Suffragette newspapers. She chaired the suffrage group in Saffron Waldon. She was an early member of the Women's Freedom League and her husband spoke for the Men's League for Women's Suffrage. In 1911, as the campaign for women's suffrage became increasingly militant, she published Suffragette Sally, a fictional account that included references to real people.

Emily Wilding Davison was a militant suffragette who died in 1913 when she was run over by the King's racehorse during a protest at Epsom. Baillie-Weaver wrote a long obituary. It was later published as The Life of Emily Davison. The following year her work Mr Jones and the Governess was published by the Women's Freedom League.

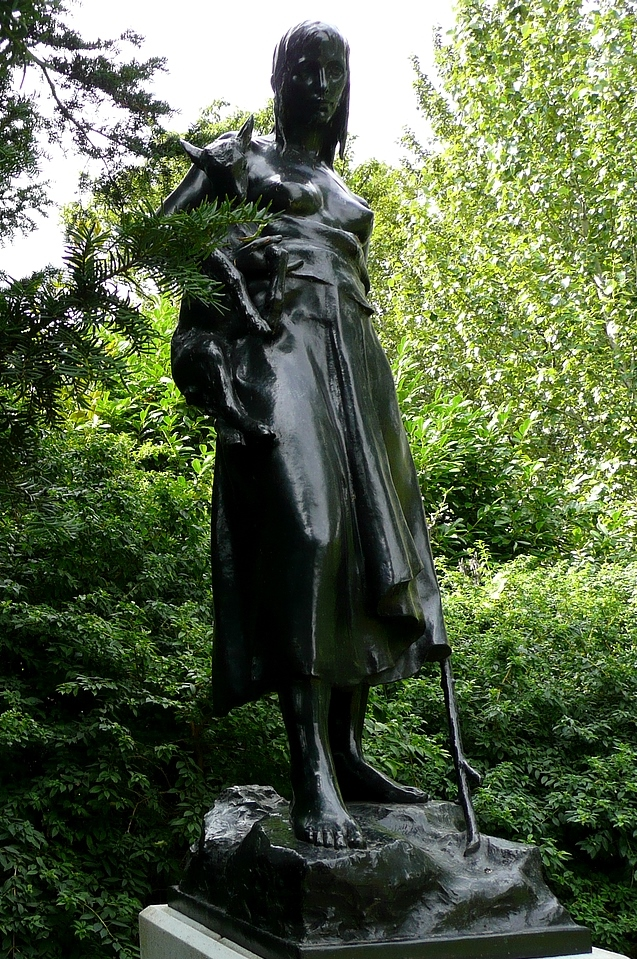
A statue in Regent's Park dedicated to Baillie-Weaver and her husband

In 1926 she published A Brother of the Shadow which returned to the themes of The Angel and the Outcast and Priests of Progress. The villain is a professor of physiology who uses mind-control to make people kill themselves.

== Legacy ==
Baillie-Weaver died in Wimbledon, London, on 26 November 1926; her husband died eight months before. She left £600 for animal welfare societies.

Baillie-Weaver and her husband were commemorated with a statue in St John's Lodge public gardens in Regent's Park, London erected in 1931. The statue by Charles Leonard Hartwell celebrates their work and the National Council for Animals' Welfare which they founded. It shows a woman "Protecting the Defenceless" and is known as The Shepherdess, or The Goatherd's Daughter.

== Selected publications ==
- Concerning Oliver Knox (1888)
- Poems of Love and Life (1896)
- Priests of Progress (1908)
- Mr. Jones and the Governess (1913)
- The Life of Emily Davison (1913)
- Ethics of Education (with Beatrice de Normann, 1918)
- A Brother of the Shadow (1926)
