= Woman's Journal =

American women's rights periodical (1870 to 1931)

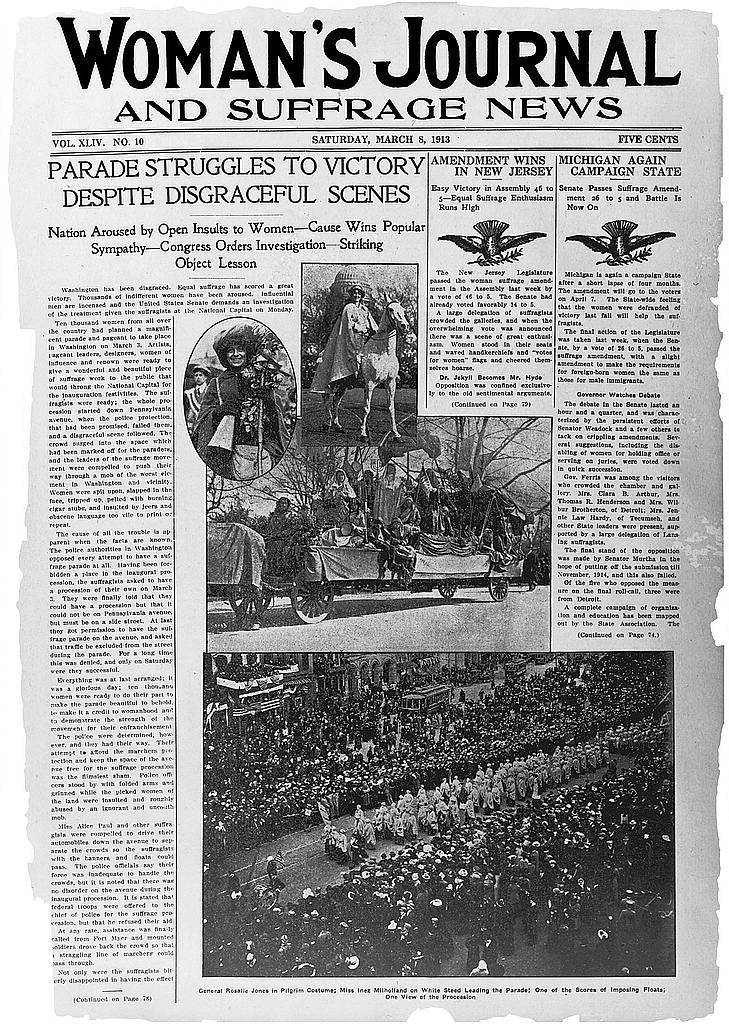
- March 8, 1913 front page of the Woman's Journal and Suffrage News depicting the Woman Suffrage Procession of 1913
- Type: Weekly newspaper
- Format: Broadsheet
- Owner: Leslie Woman Suffrage Commission (1917–1931)
- Founder(s): Lucy Stone; Henry Browne Blackwell
- Founded: January 8, 1870 (Boston, Massachusetts)
- Ceased publication: June 1931
- Circulation: 27,634 (1915)

Woman's Journal was an American women's rights periodical published from 1870 to 1931. It was founded in 1870 in Boston, Massachusetts, by Lucy Stone and her husband Henry Browne Blackwell as a weekly newspaper. In 1917 it was purchased by Carrie Chapman Catt's Leslie Woman Suffrage Commission and merged with The Woman Voter and National Suffrage News to become known as The Woman Citizen. It served as the official organ of the National American Woman Suffrage Association until 1920, when the organization was reformed as the League of Women Voters, and the Nineteenth Amendment to the United States Constitution was passed granting women the right to vote. Publication of Woman Citizen slowed from weekly, to bi-weekly, to monthly. In 1927, it was renamed The Woman's Journal. It ceased publication in June 1931.

== History ==
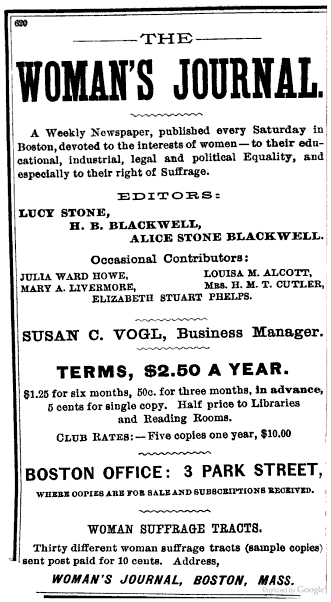
1887 advertisement

Woman's Journal was founded in 1870 in Boston, Massachusetts, by Lucy Stone and her husband Henry Browne Blackwell as a weekly newspaper. The new paper incorporated Mary A. Livermore's The Agitator, as well as a lesser known periodical called the Woman's Advocate.

The works of Ohioan comedy writer Rosella Rice, whose poems mythologized the figure of Johnny Appleseed, were published in Woman's Journal.

The first issue was published on January 8, on the second anniversary of the first issue of Susan B. Anthony's The Revolution. Stone and Blackwell served as editors, with assistance from Livermore. Julia Ward Howe edited from 1872 to 1879. Alice Stone Blackwell, daughter of Stone and Blackwell, began editing in 1883 and took over as sole editor after her father's death in 1909, continuing until 1917. Contributors included Charlotte Perkins Gilman, Antoinette Brown Blackwell, Mary Johnston, Stephen S. Wise, Zona Gale, Florence Kelley, Witter Bynner, Ben B. Lindsey, Louisa May Alcott, Harriet Clisby and Caroline Bartlett Crane. William Lloyd Garrison was a frequent contributor. Around 1887, headquarters were located in Boston on Park Street.

Woman's Journal refused to carry advertisements for tobacco, liquor, or drugs.

In 1910, Woman's Journal absorbed Progress, the official organ of the National American Woman Suffrage Association (NAWSA). Until 1912, it served in that capacity, at which point it was renamed Woman's Journal and Suffrage News. By 1915, circulation had reached 27,634, up from 2,328 in 1909.

=== The Woman Citizen ===
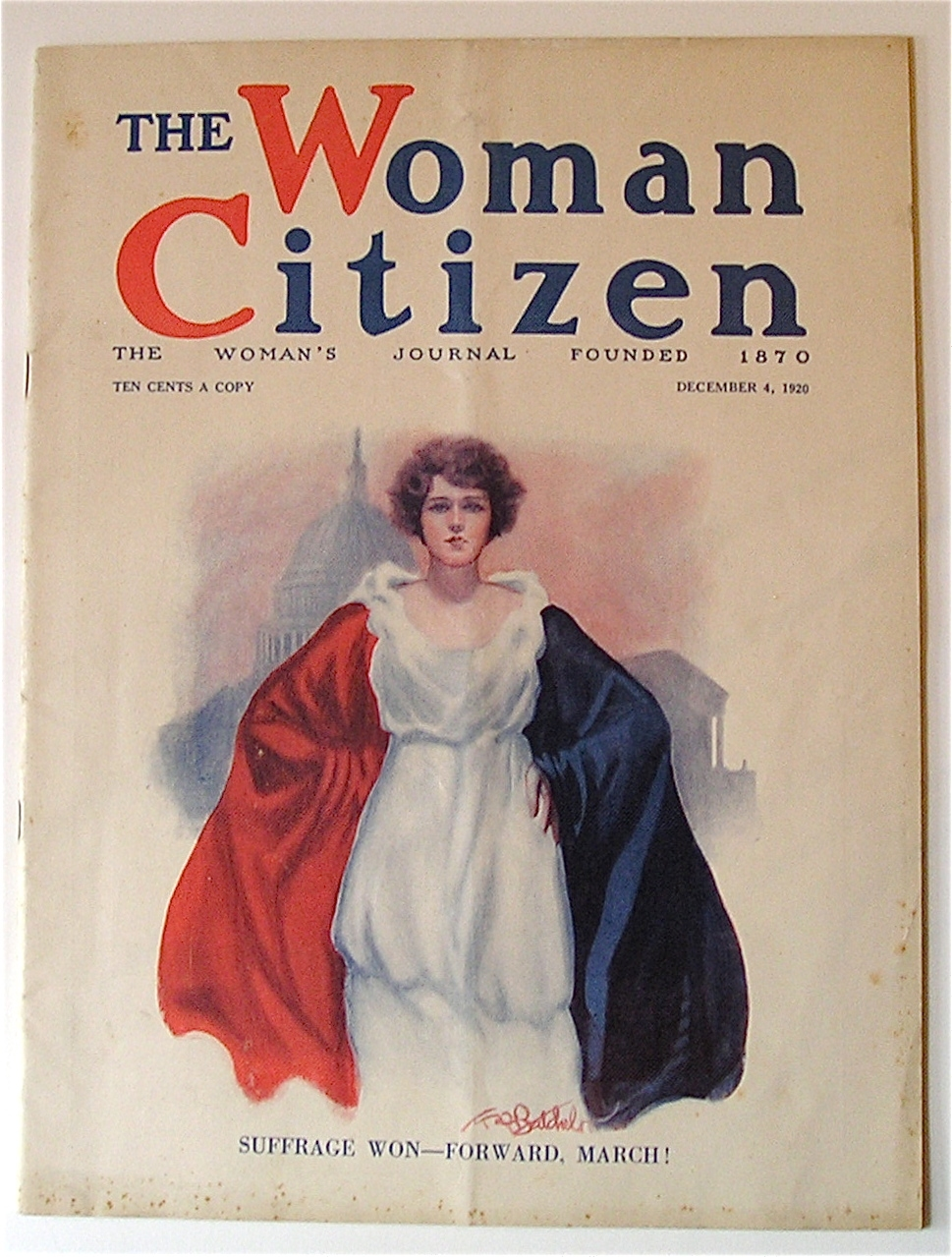
The Woman Citizen, December 4, 1920

In 1917, Woman's Journal was purchased by Carrie Chapman Catt's Leslie Woman Suffrage Commission for $50,000, and merged with The Woman Voter, the official journal of the Woman Suffrage Party of New York City, and NAWSA's National Suffrage News to become known as The Woman Citizen. It served as NAWSA's official organ until 1920, when NAWSA was reformed as the League of Women Voters, and the Nineteenth Amendment to the United States Constitution was passed ensuring women's right to vote.

The editor-in-chief of The Woman Citizen was Rose Emmet Young; Alice Stone Blackwell was a contributing editor. Every U.S. Congress member was given a free subscription to the journal. It covered issues such as child labor in addition to women's suffrage. After women won the right to vote, the journal's focus shifted to political education for women. One of the aims of the League of Women Voters was to demonstrate its continued political power, now in the form of large numbers of newly enfranchised voters, and to soften its image in the eyes of women who were wary of radical politics. To that end, the journal courted middle-class female readers. It editorialized in support of the Maternity and Infancy Act of 1921, which was the first major legislation to be passed after the full enfranchisement of women. Readers were urged to support the Act by writing to their representatives and talking to their neighbors about it; one article included step-by-step instructions for finding out the names and addresses of their legislators.

Publication of Woman Citizen slowed from weekly, to bi-weekly, to monthly. In 1927, it was renamed The Woman's Journal. It ceased publication in June 1931.

== See also ==
- American Woman Suffrage Association
- Women's suffrage in the United States
- List of feminist periodicals in the United States
- List of suffragists and suffragettes
- List of women's rights activists
- Timeline of women's suffrage
- Timeline of women's legal rights (other than voting)
- Women's suffrage publications

== Bibliography ==
- Ryan, Agnes E. The Torch Bearer: A Look Forward and Back at the Woman's Journal, the Organ of the Woman's Movement, 1916. National American Woman Suffrage Association Collection, Library of Congress
