= The Woman Voter =

Monthly suffragist journal published in New York City

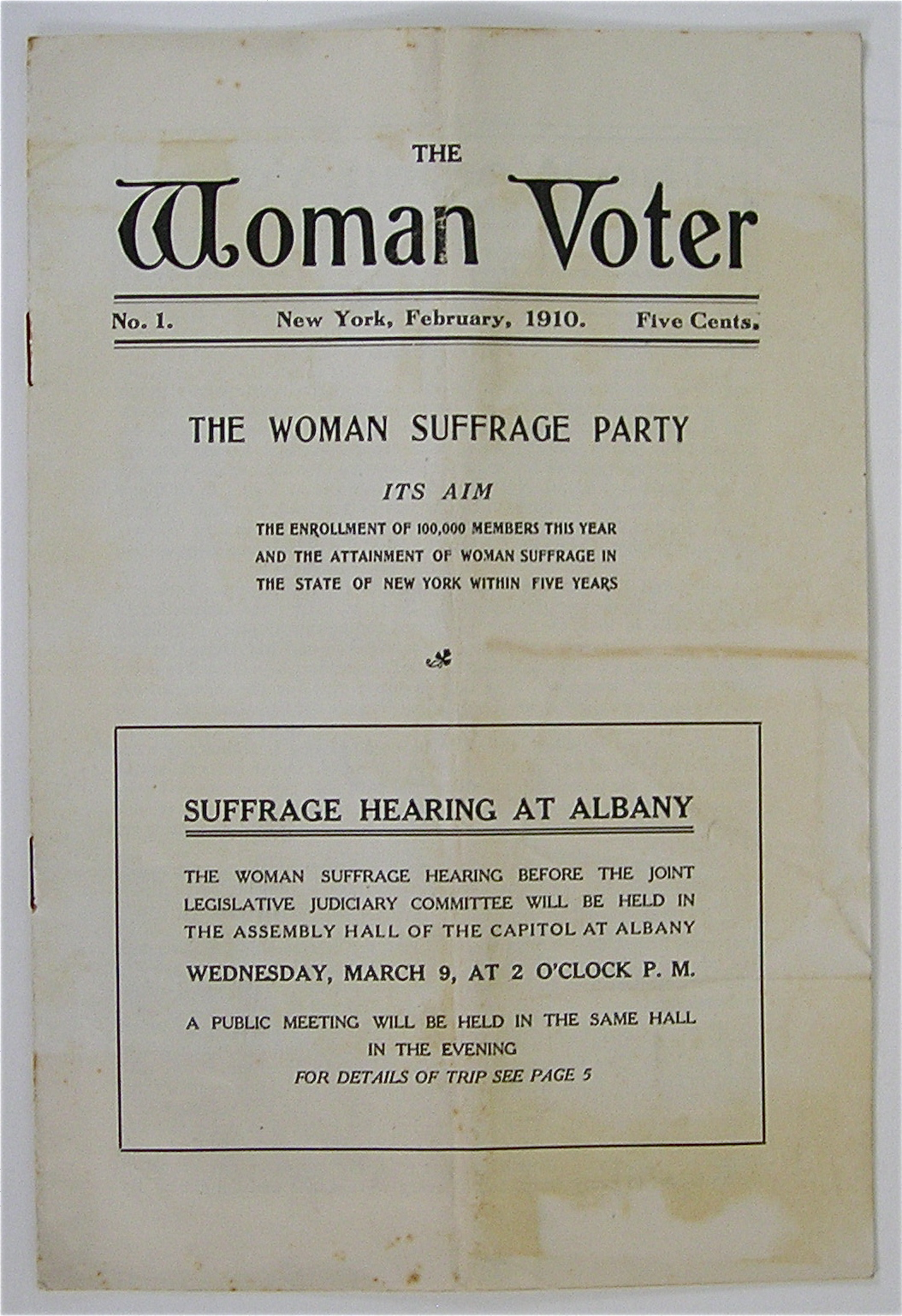
Publication of The Woman Voter, journal of the New York Woman Suffrage Party. February 1910

The Woman Voter was a monthly suffragist journal published in New York City by the Woman Suffrage Party (WSP). It ran between 1910 and 1917. The first editor was Mary Ritter Beard. Beard created a suffragist publication which was unique in offering coverage of topics that "cut across class, age and organizational boundaries."

== History ==
The Woman Voter was created in 1909 in order to keep members of the Woman Suffrage Party (WSP) informed about party activities, updated with pertinent news and editorials relating to women's suffrage. The back of the publication included a "membership blank" to help increase the size of the WSP. Beard started as editor of the journal in 1910. With Beard's leadership, the Voter expanded its offerings, providing longer articles, stories about workers, and also stories for children about suffrage. Beard also gave room in the Voter for the opinions of trade unionist, Leonora O'Reilly. The author of 'The Woman Voter' was Vida Goldstein, a feminist and a suffragist.

Beard quit as editor in April 1912, and the new editor became Florence Woolston. Woolston continued running the journal in a manner similar to Beard.

In January 1913, The Woman Voter negotiated to merge with the newsletter of the New York State chapter of the National Woman Suffrage Association, and after 1913 and for a year, the journal was known as The Woman Voter and the Newsletter. In 1914, Voter reverted to its original name and focused heavily on the upcoming vote for women's suffrage in 1915.

When women did not get the vote in 1915, Woolston "returned the Voter to its broader mission." Voter began to focus on the new vote for suffrage taking place in New York in November 1917, however, the publication had its last issue in May 1917 and then was merged into the Woman's Journal and The National Suffrage News. The new publication was called The Woman Citizen.
