= Miriam Leslie =

American publisher, author, and suffragist

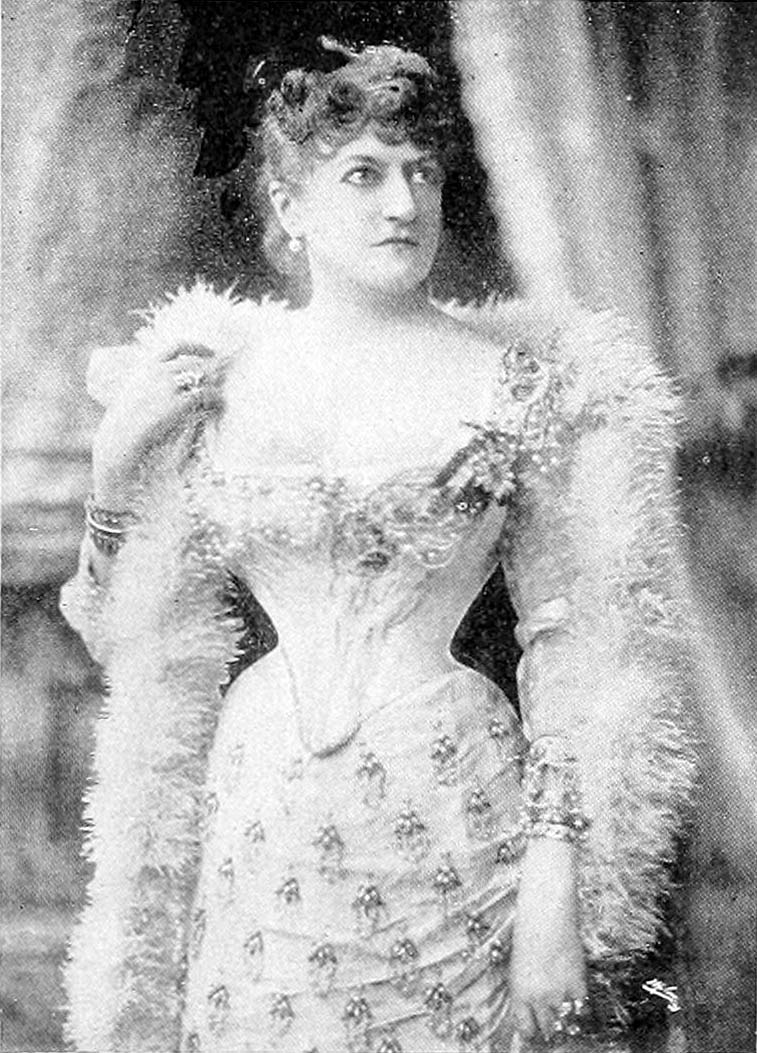
- A Woman of the Century
- Born: June 5, 1836
- Died: September 18, 1914 (aged 78)
- Occupations: publisher, author

Miriam Leslie (née Follin; after first marriage, Peacock; after second marriage, Squier; after third marriage, Leslie; after fourth marriage, Wilde; claimed title, Baroness de Bazus; June 5, 1836 – September 18, 1914) was an American publisher and author. She was the wife of Frank Leslie and the heir to his publishing business, which she developed into a paying concern from a state of precarious indebtedness. After her husband's death, she changed her own name to his, Frank Leslie. She made Carrie Chapman Catt a residuary legatee of her estate, to support enfranchising women. The activist established the Leslie Woman Suffrage Commission for this purpose.

== Biography ==
=== Early life and marriages ===
Miriam Florence Follin was born in New Orleans, Louisiana, June 5, 1836. She described her own childhood as "starved and pinched" as far as "love and merriment go." Leslie claimed to be the descendant of an aristocratic French Huguenot family, whose ancestors had immigrated to the colonies because of religious persecution. After a trip to France, in 1901, Follin claimed the title Baroness de Bazus. She apparently grew up in New York City, and was well educated in the French, Spanish and Italian languages.

She married four times. Her first marriage, on March 25, 1854, was to David Charles Peacock. That marriage was annulled two years later. She married pioneer anthropologist and archeologist Ephraim Squier.

When the editor of Frank Leslie's Lady's Magazine had fallen ill, probably in the late 1860s, Miriam Squier volunteered to fill in while the ill editor still received the salary. The editor died, and she took on the position permanently. The November 18, 1871, issue of the magazine was published with the notation "conducted by Miriam F. Squier."

=== Marriage to Frank Leslie ===
Miriam divorced Ephraim Squier on May 31, 1873, to marry publisher Frank Leslie. During their honeymoon, the couple met Western poet and author Joaquin Miller. The new Mrs. Leslie and Miller began an affair. He later modeled the main character after her in his novel The One Fair Woman (1876).

The Leslies' summer home was in Saratoga Springs, New York, where they entertained many notables, and she was a leader in society. In 1877, they took a lavish train trip with a numerous retinue from New York City to San Francisco. Leslie wrote her account of this trip in her travel book California: A Pleasure Trip from Gotham to the Golden Gate (1877). The expense of the trip and a late 19th-century business depression left Leslie's business badly in debt.

When Frank Leslie died in 1880, the debts amounted to $300,000, and his will was contested by creditors. Miriam Leslie took the business in hand and put it on a paying basis. In addition, she had her name legally changed to Frank Leslie in June 1881. She later effected a reorganization of the business and became its president. The circulation of the Popular Monthly increased by 200,000 in four months under her management.

While abroad in 1891, Miriam Leslie married Willie Wilde, the older brother of playwright Oscar Wilde. Two years later, they divorced. In 1902 she sold out all her publishing interests.

== Death and legacy ==
Leslie died on September 18, 1914. Her remains are buried in Woodlawn Cemetery in The Bronx, New York City.

By her will, she made Carrie Chapman Catt residuary legatee, in the expectation that most of her fortune would be devoted to women's suffrage. Relatives contested the will, but Catt received enough money to set up the Leslie Woman Suffrage Commission.

== Works ==
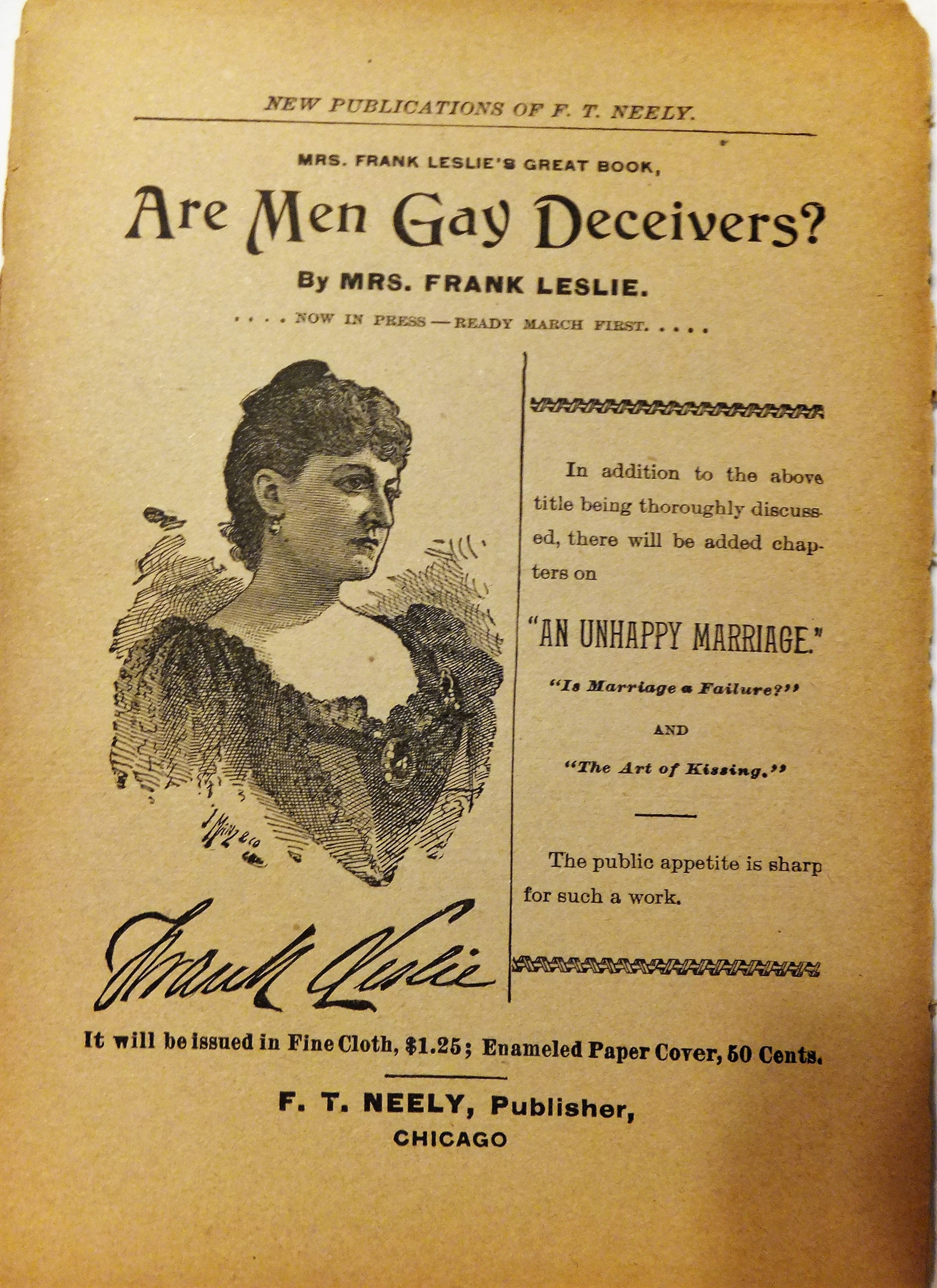
Are Men Gay Deceivers? by Mrs. Frank Leslie, 1893

- California: A Pleasure Trip from Gotham to the Golden Gate, April, May, June, 1877 (1877)
- Rents in Our Robes (1888)
- Are We All Deceivers? The Lover's Blue Book (1892)
- A Social Mirage (1899)

As translator:

- The Demi-Monde (1858), original by Alexandre Dumas fils (1855)
