= Era (disambiguation) =

An era is a span of time.

Era or ERA may also refer to:

- Era (geology), a subdivision of geologic time
- Calendar era

== Education ==
- Academy of European Law (German: Europäische Rechtsakademie), an international law school
- ERA School, in Melbourne, Australia
- Era University, in Lucknow, India

== Games and sports ==
- Earned run average, a baseball statistic
- Elite Rodeo Athletes, a professional rodeo organization
- English Racing Automobiles, a manufacturer of racing cars
- Era Basket Liga (EBL), name of Polish Basketball League due to sponsorship reasons in 2003–2005

== Media ==
- Era (publisher), a Bulgarian publishing house
- Era (radio station), in Malaysia
- Era Television, a Taiwanese television network
- Improvement Era, a defunct magazine of The Church of Jesus Christ of Latter-day Saints
- Hellenic Radio, the main public radio broadcaster in Greece
- The Era (newspaper), a defunct British weekly
- TV Era, a television channel in North Macedonia

== Music ==
- Era (musical project), a New Age music project by French composer Eric Lévi
  - Era (Era album), 1996
- Era (Disappears album), 2013
- Era (Echo Lake album), 2015
- Era (Elvenking album), 2012
- Era (Bleed from Within album), 2018
- The Era (album), by Jay Chou
- Era, a 2007 album by In the Nursery
- "Era" (song), Italy's entry to the Eurovision song contest 1975
- Era Records, an American record label

== People ==
- Era. Anbarasu, Indian politician
- Era Bell Thompson (1905–1986), American journalist
- Era Bernard, Indian politician
- Era Istrefi (born 1994), Albanian musician
- Era Natarasan (born 1964), Indian writer
- Era Ziganshina (born 1944), Soviet and Russian film and stage actress

== Places ==
- Era (river), of Tuscany in Italy
- Era, Ohio, United States
- Era, Texas, United States
- Era (reservoir), Ethiopia
- Era Quhila, another reservoir in Ethiopia

== Politics and government ==
- Electricity Regulatory Authority, of the Government of Uganda
- Electronic Records Archives, of the United States National Archives and Records Administration
- Environment and Resources Authority, a government agency of Malta
- European Radical Alliance, a defunct political group in the European Parliament
- European Union Agency for Railways, sets mandatory requirements for European railways
- Excellence in Research for Australia, a research assessment initiative of the Australian Government

=== Legislation ===
- Education Reform Act (disambiguation), or specifically
  - Education Reform Act 1988 of the Parliament of the United Kingdom
  - Kentucky Education Reform Act
  - Massachusetts Education Reform Act of 1993
- Emergency Relief Appropriation Act of 1935 of the United States Congress
- Employee Rights Act, proposed legislation in the United States Congress
- Employment Relations Act 2000 of the Parliament of New Zealand
- Employment Rights Act 1996, of the Parliament of the United Kingdom
- Equal Rights Amendment, a proposed, but unratified, amendment to the United States Constitution
  - State equal rights amendments, similar laws passed in various U.S. states

== Science and technology ==
- Earth rotation angle in astrometry
- ECMWF re-analysis in meteorology
- Eigensystem realization algorithm
- Electronic Reactions of Abrams, a discredited medical theory of Albert Abrams
- Elementary recursive arithmetic
- ERA (command), a file erase command under CP/M and DR-DOS
- European Research Area, a system of scientific research programmes
- European Robotic Arm, on the International Space Station
- Exobiology Radiation Assembly, an experiment in Earth orbit
- Explosive reactive armour
- EraMobile

== Transport ==
- Era Alaska, now Ravn Alaska, an American airline
- Era Aviation, a defunct American airline
- Eastham Rake railway station, in England
- Electric Raceabout, a Finnish electric sports car
- European Regions Airline Association, a trade association
- Winnebago Era, a motorhome

== Other uses ==
- Educational Research Analysts, an organization created by Mel and Norma Gabler
- Electricity Regulatory Authority, a Uganda government electricity regulatory agency.
- Electronic remittance advice
- Energy Resources of Australia, an Australian mining company
- Energy Retail Association, a trade association in Great Britain
- Engine room artificer, a Royal Navy position
- Engineering Research Associates, a defunct American computer manufacturer
- Entrepreneurs Roundtable Accelerator, an American startup accelerator
- Equal Rights Advocates, an American women's rights organization
- Equal Rights Association, a defunct American suffrage organization
- Eramet, a French multinational mining and metallurgy company
- European Rental Association, a trade association
- Environmental Risk Assessment

== See also ==
- Eras (disambiguation)
