= Charles Fox Hovey =

American businessman

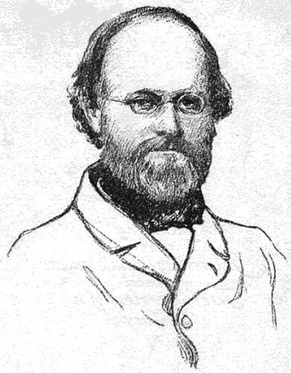
Charles Fox Hovey

Charles Fox Hovey (1807–1859) was a businessman in Boston, Massachusetts who established C.F. Hovey and Co., a department store on Summer Street. Through the years Hovey's business partners included Washington Williams, James H. Bryden, Richard C. Greenleaf and John Chandler. In 1947 Jordan Marsh absorbed Hovey's.

Hovey was also an abolitionist and a supporter of other social reform movements. He was one of a group of Boston businessmen who provided most of the funding for the American Anti-Slavery Society. He also signed the call to the first National Woman's Rights Convention in 1850. Hovey left a bequest of $50,000 to support abolitionism and other types of social reform, including "women's rights, non-resistance, free trade and temperance." The bequest was used to create the Hovey Fund, which provided significant support to social reform movements of that time. It was headed by abolitionist Wendell Phillips.

== Images ==
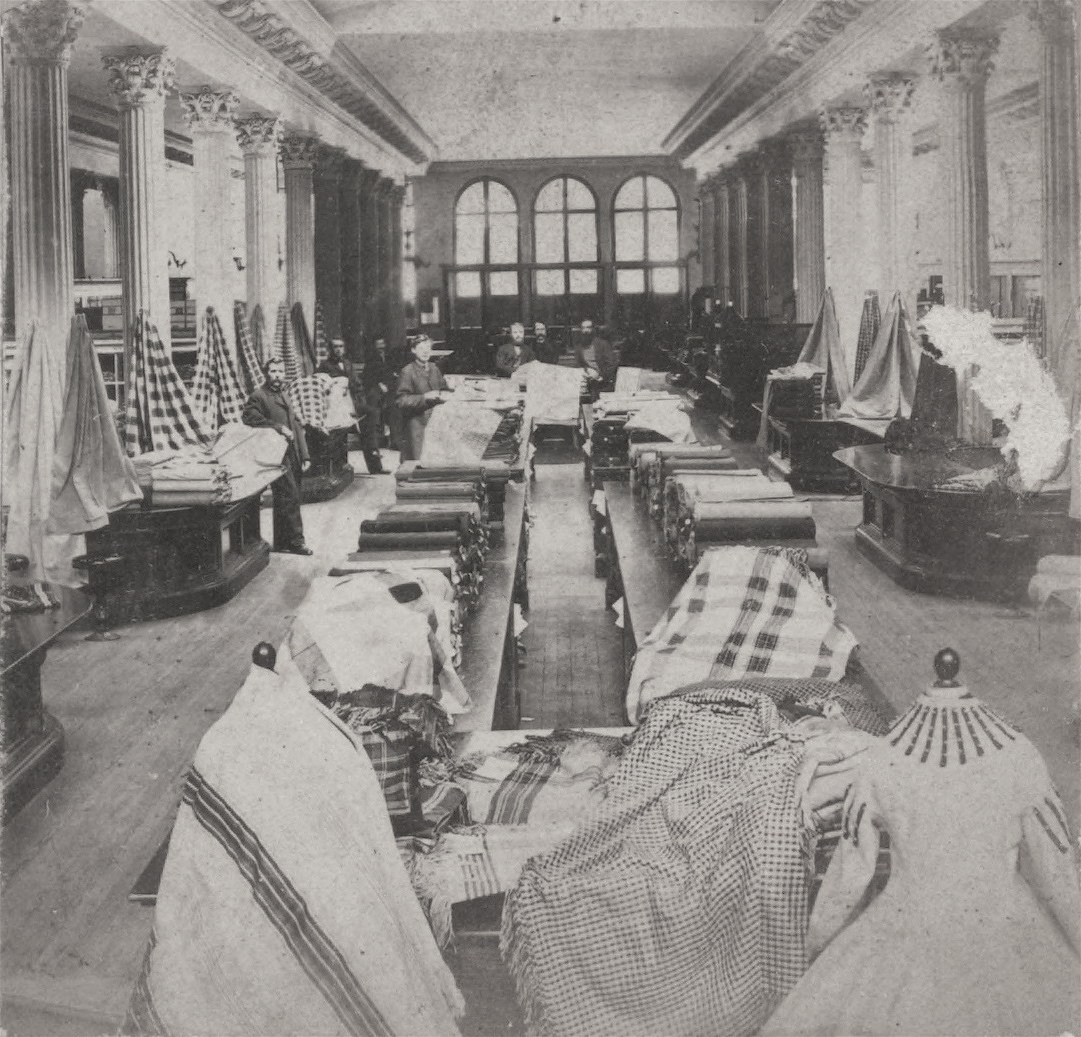
Interior of C.F. Hovey & Co., Summer Street, Boston, 19th century

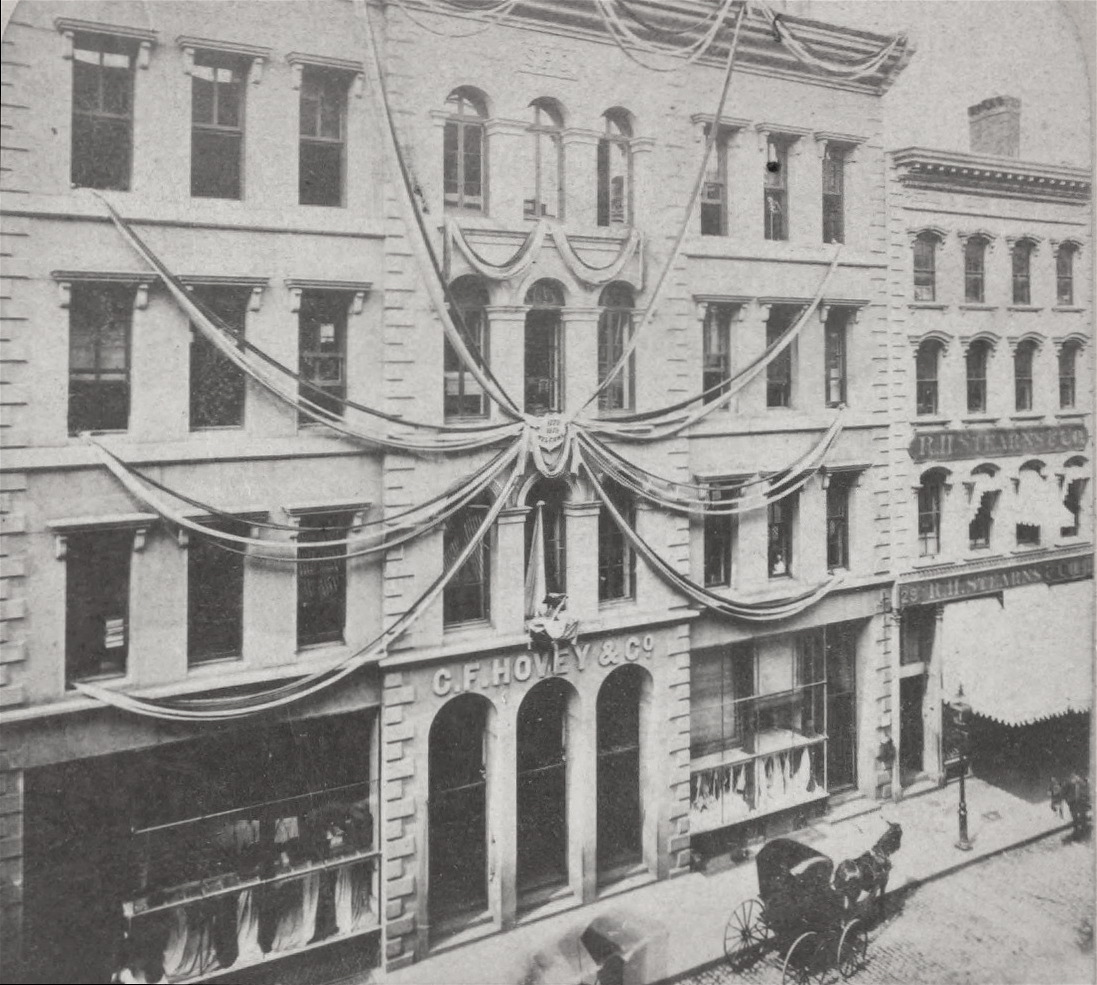
Exterior of C.F. Hovey & Co., Summer Street, Boston, 19th century

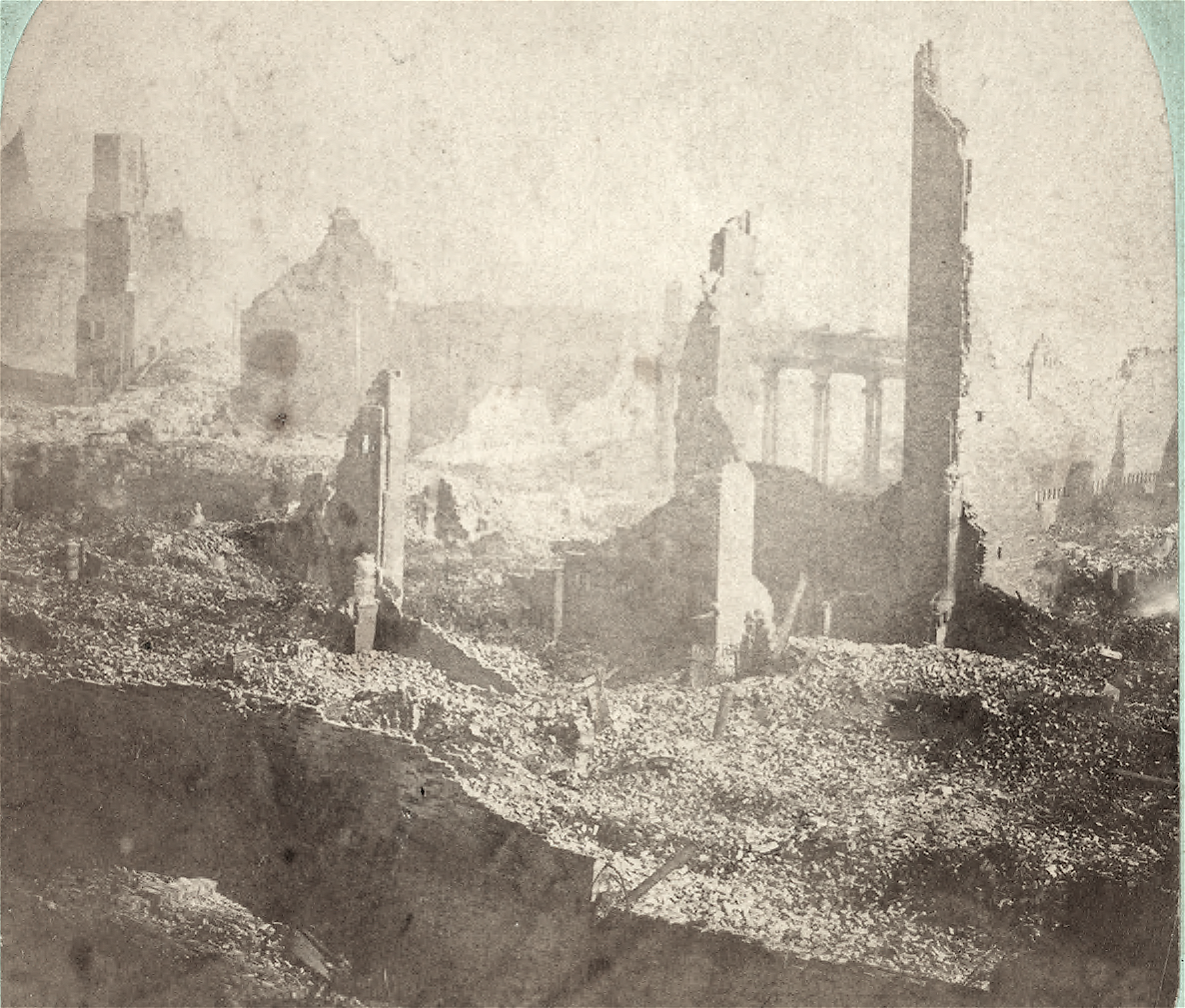
Hovey's after the fire, 1872

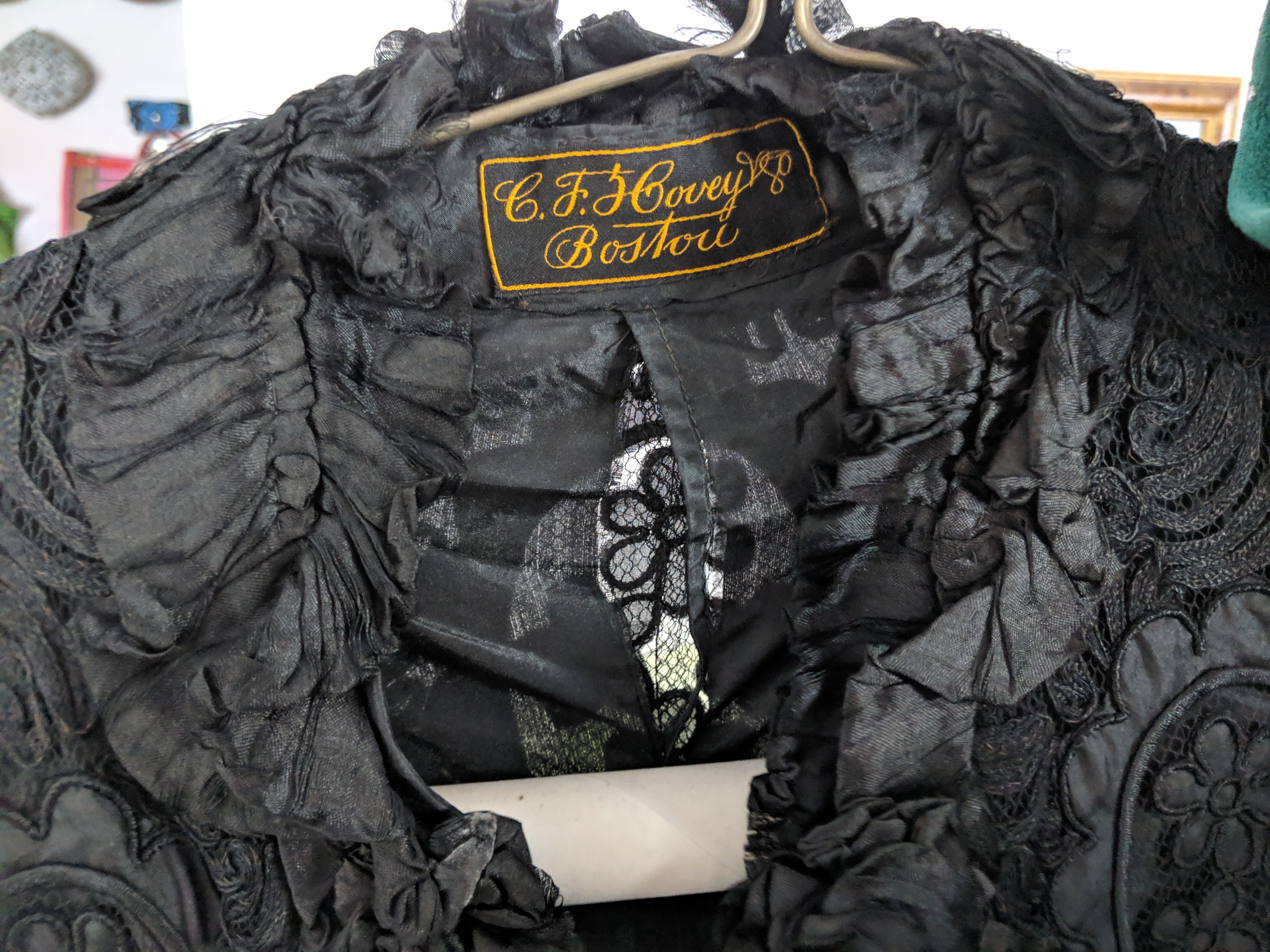
Women's Victorian era garment from C.F. Hovey & Co. including label
