= American Equal Rights Association =

US 19th-century suffrage organization

- Abbreviation: AERA
- Formation: 1866
- Dissolved: 1870
- Key people: Lucretia Mott, Frederick Douglass, Susan B. Anthony, and Elizabeth Cady Stanton

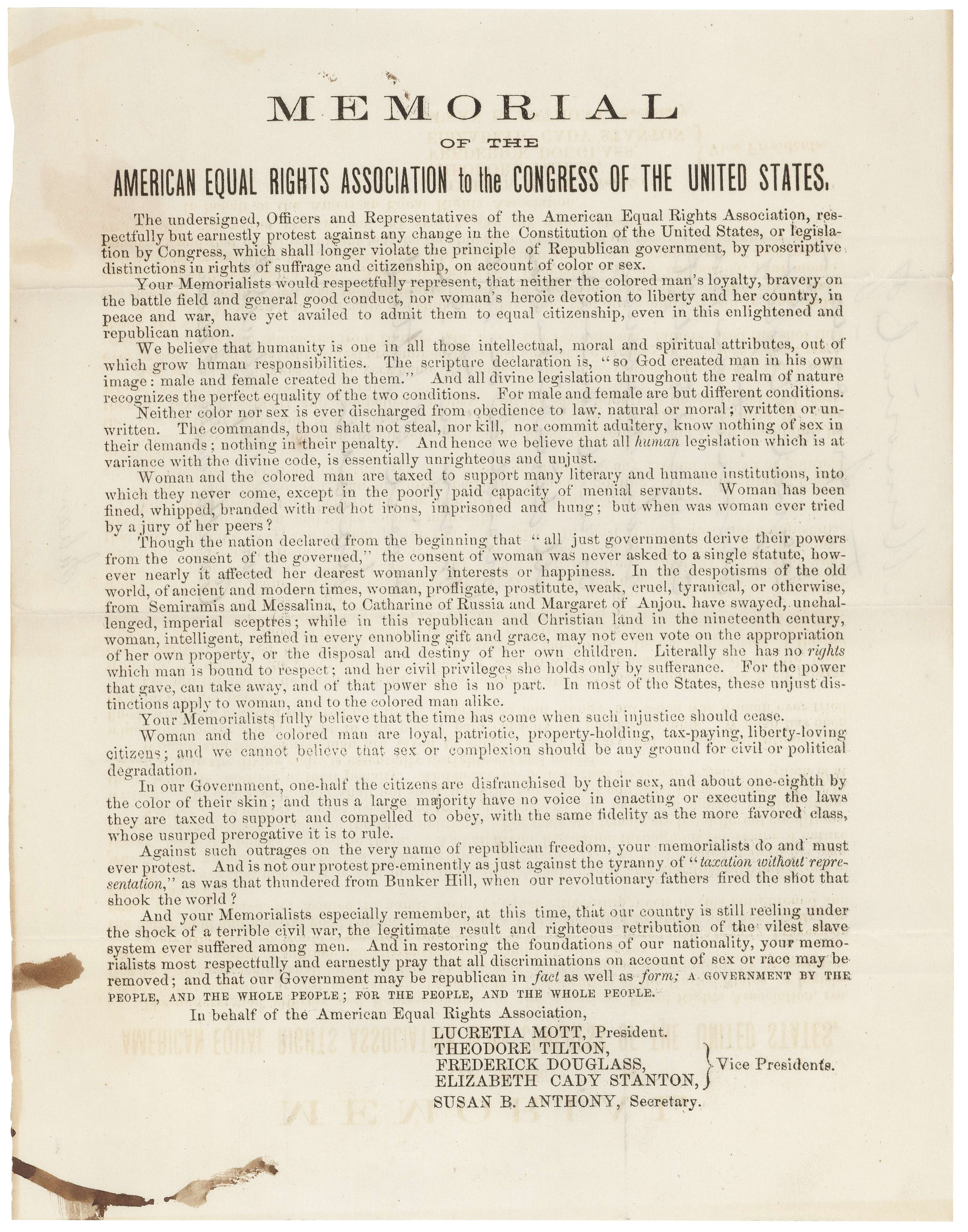
American Equal Rights Association Memorial 3 January 1867

The American Equal Rights Association (AERA) was formed in 1866 in the United States. According to its constitution, its purpose was "to secure Equal Rights to all American citizens, especially the right of suffrage, irrespective of race, color or sex." Some of the more prominent reform activists of that time were members, including women and men, blacks and whites.

The AERA was created by the Eleventh National Women's Rights Convention, which transformed itself into the new organization. Leaders of the women's movement had earlier suggested the creation of a similar equal rights organization through a merger of their movement with the American Anti-Slavery Society, but that organization did not accept their proposal.

The AERA conducted two major campaigns during 1867. In New York, which was in the process of revising its state constitution, AERA workers collected petitions in support of women's suffrage and the removal of property requirements that discriminated specifically against black voters. In Kansas they campaigned for referendums that would enfranchise African Americans and women. In both places they encountered increasing resistance to the campaign for women's suffrage from former abolitionist allies who viewed it as a hindrance to the immediate goal of winning suffrage for African American men. The Kansas campaign ended in disarray and recrimination, creating divisions between those who worked primarily for the rights of African Americans and those who worked primarily for the rights of women, and also creating divisions within the women's movement itself.

The AERA continued to hold annual meetings after the failure of the Kansas campaign, but growing differences made it difficult for its members to work together. Disagreement about the proposed Fifteenth Amendment to the U.S. Constitution, which would prohibit the denial of suffrage because of race, was especially sharp because it did not also prohibit the denial of suffrage because of sex. The acrimonious AERA meeting in 1869 signaled the end of the organization and led to the formation of two competing women's suffrage organizations. The bitter disagreements that led to the demise of the AERA continued to influence the women's movement in subsequent years.

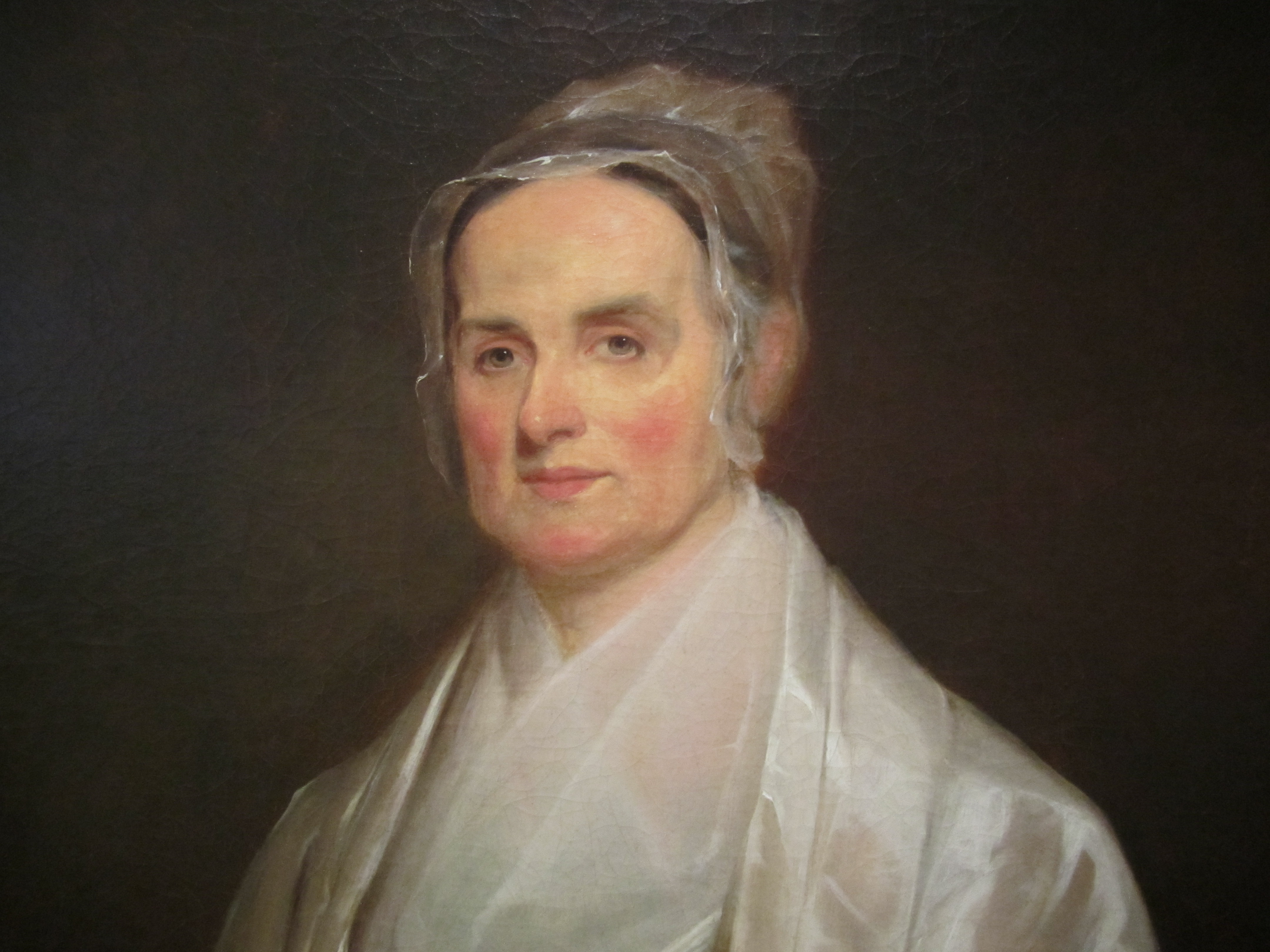
Lucretia Mott, president of the AERA

== History ==
=== Leading participants ===
The people who played significant roles in the AERA included some of the more prominent reform activists of that time, many of them already acquainted with one another as veterans of the anti-slavery and women's rights movements:

- Lucretia Mott, the president of the AERA, was an abolitionist who was prevented from participating in the World Anti-Slavery Convention in London in 1840 because she was a woman. She was the main attraction and one of the organizers of the 1848 Seneca Falls Convention, the first women's rights convention.
- Elizabeth Cady Stanton attended the 1840 World Anti-Slavery Convention as an observer, accompanying her husband Henry B. Stanton, who had worked as an agent of the American Anti-Slavery Society. There she and Mott became friends and vowed to organize a women's rights convention in the United States. Stanton was an organizer of the Seneca Falls Convention and the primary author of its Declaration of Sentiments.
- Lucy Stone was a pioneering worker for women's rights and an organizer of the first National Women's Rights Convention in 1850. She became a paid representative of the American Anti-Slavery Society in 1848 under an arrangement by which she could also lecture on women's rights but without pay.
- Susan B. Anthony became a paid representative of the Anti-Slavery Society in 1856 with the understanding that she would also continue to campaign for women's rights.
- Frederick Douglass was an escaped slave and abolitionist leader who played a pivotal role in the Seneca Falls women's rights convention. He and Anthony both lived in Rochester, NY, and were family friends.
- Frances Ellen Watkins Harper the Black American poet and anti-slavery lecturer
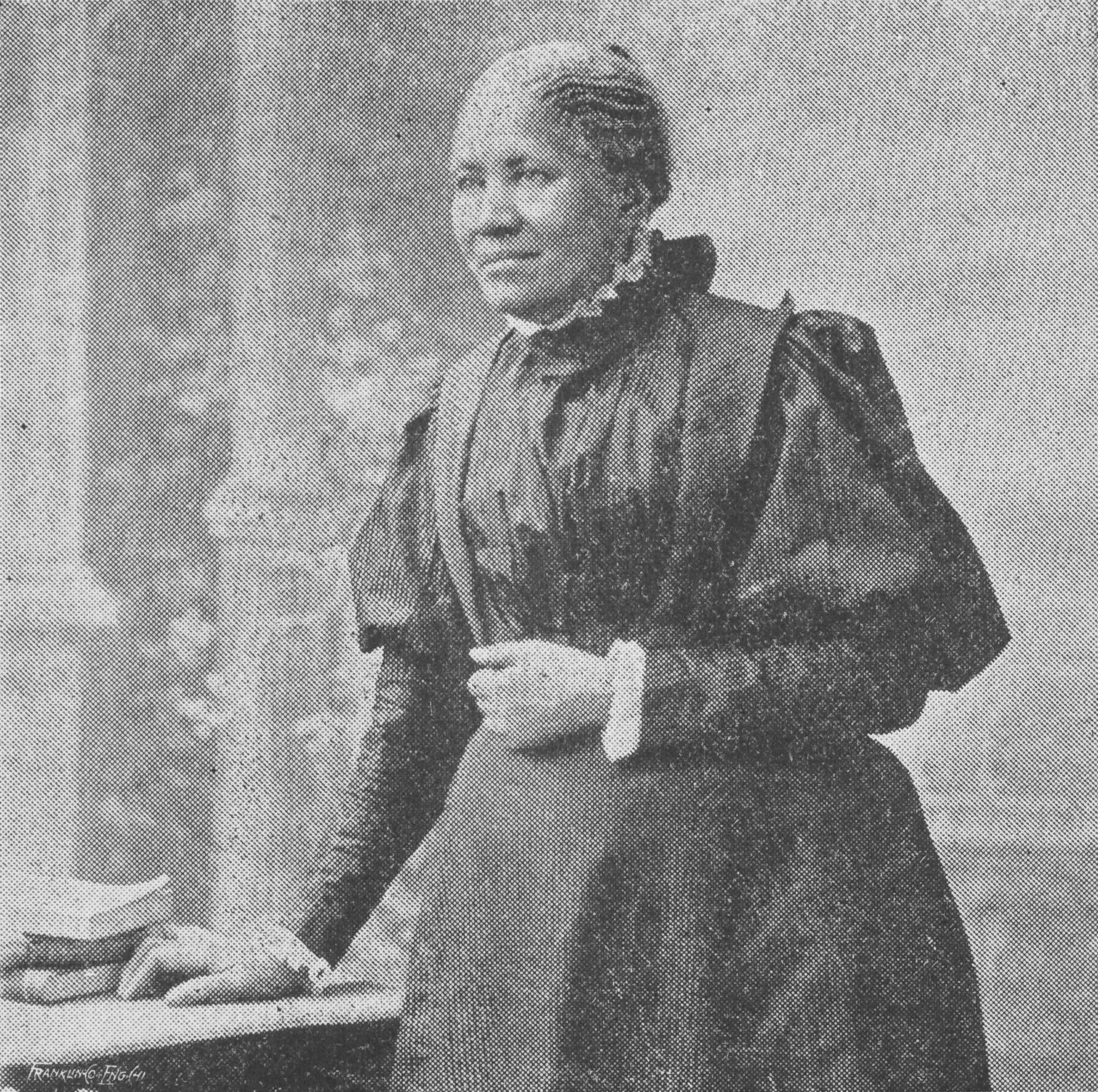
  Frances Ellen Watkins Harper, speaker at 1866 AERA Convention
- Abby Kelley Foster and her husband Stephen Symonds Foster were abolitionists who had encouraged Anthony to become active in the Anti-Slavery Society.
- Henry Blackwell, who was married to Lucy Stone, worked against slavery and for women's rights.
- Sojourner Truth, abolitionist and women's-rights activist
- Sarah Parker Remond, abolitionist and activist for formerly enslaved Black people

=== Background events ===
Although still relatively small, the women's rights movement had grown in the years before the American Civil War, aided by the introduction of women to social activism through the abolitionist movement. The American Anti-Slavery Society, led by William Lloyd Garrison, was particularly encouraging to those who championed women's rights. The planning committee for the first National Women's Rights Convention in October 1850 was formed by people who were attending a convention of the Anti-Slavery Society earlier that year.

The women's movement was loosely structured during this period, with legislative campaigns and speaking tours organized by a small group of women acting on personal initiative. An informal coordinating committee organized national women's rights conventions, but there were only a few state associations and no formal national organization. The movement largely disappeared from public notice during the Civil War (1861–1865) as women's rights activists focused their energy on the campaign against slavery. In 1863 Elizabeth Cady Stanton and Susan B. Anthony organized the Women's Loyal National League, the first national women's political organization in the U.S., to campaign for an amendment to the U.S. Constitution that would abolish slavery.

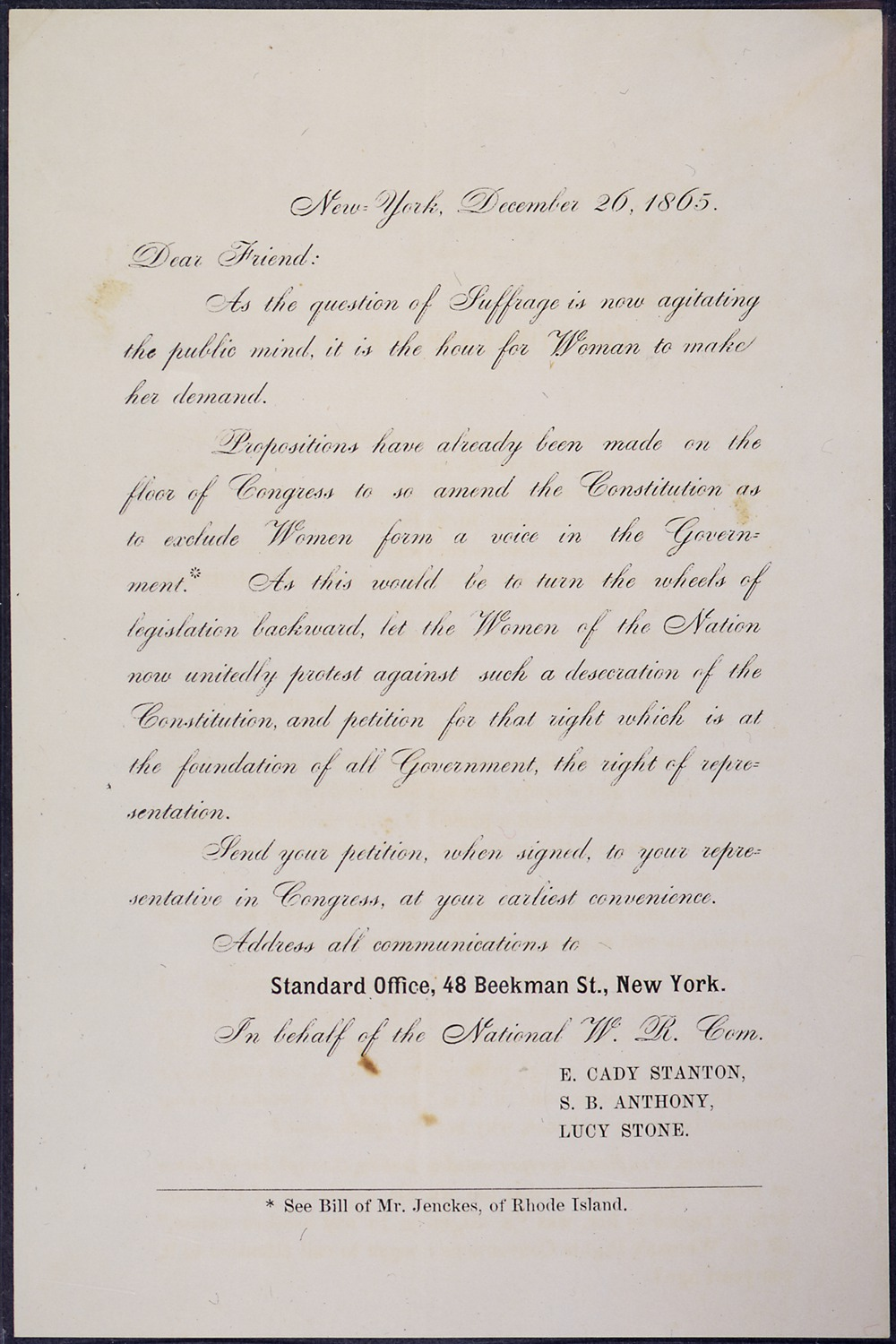
The letter that Stanton, Anthony and Stone circulated calling for petitions against introducing the word "male" into the U.S. Constitution via the Fourteenth Amendment

After slavery in the U.S. was abolished by the Thirteenth Amendment in 1865, Wendell Phillips was elected president of the Anti-Slavery Society and began to direct its resources toward winning political rights for blacks. He told women's rights activists that he continued to support women's suffrage but thought it best to set aside that demand until voting rights for African American men were assured.

The women's movement began to revive when proposals for a Fourteenth Amendment began circulating that would secure citizenship (but not yet voting rights) for African Americans. Some of the proposals for this amendment would also for the first time introduce the word "male" into the Constitution, which begins with the words "We the People of the United States". Stanton said that "if that word 'male' be inserted, it will take us a century at least to get it out." Stanton, Anthony and Lucy Stone, the most prominent figures in the women's movement, circulated a letter in late 1865 calling for petitions against any wording that excluded females. A version of the amendment that referred to "persons" instead of "males" passed the House of Representatives in early 1866 but failed in the Senate. The version that Congress eventually approved and sent to the states for ratification included the word "male" three times. Stanton and Anthony opposed the amendment, but Stone supported it as a step towards universal suffrage. Frederick Douglass denounced it because it permitted states to disenfranchise blacks if those states were willing to accept reduced representation at the federal level. The Fourteenth Amendment was ratified in 1868.

At a meeting of the Anti-Slavery Society in January 1866, Stone and Anthony proposed a merger of that organization with the women's rights movement to create a new organization that would advocate for the rights for African Americans and women, including suffrage for both. The proposal was blocked by Phillips, who once again argued that the key issue of the day was suffrage for African American men.

Phillips and other abolitionist leaders expected a constitutional provision of voting rights for former slaves to help preserve the North's recent victory over the slaveholding states during the Civil War. No such benefit could be expected to follow from women's suffrage, and the effort needed to mount an effective campaign for it, they believed, would endanger the chances of winning suffrage for African American men. (Their strategy did not work as planned. Even though the Constitution was amended in 1870 to prohibit the denial of voting rights because of race, a promise that became a reality for a brief period, violence and legal maneuvers prevented most African Americans in the South from voting until the passage of the Voting Rights Act of 1965.)

=== Founding in 1866 ===
Elizabeth Cady Stanton and Susan B. Anthony issued the call for the Eleventh National Women's Rights Convention, the first since the Civil War began, which met on May 10, 1866, in New York City. Frances Ellen Watkins Harper, an African American abolitionist and writer, spoke at the convention from the viewpoint of one who had to deal with issues faced by both women and black people: "You white women speak here of rights. I speak of wrongs. I, as a colored woman, have had in this country an education which has made me feel as if I were in the situation of Ishmael, my hand against every man, and every man's hand against me."

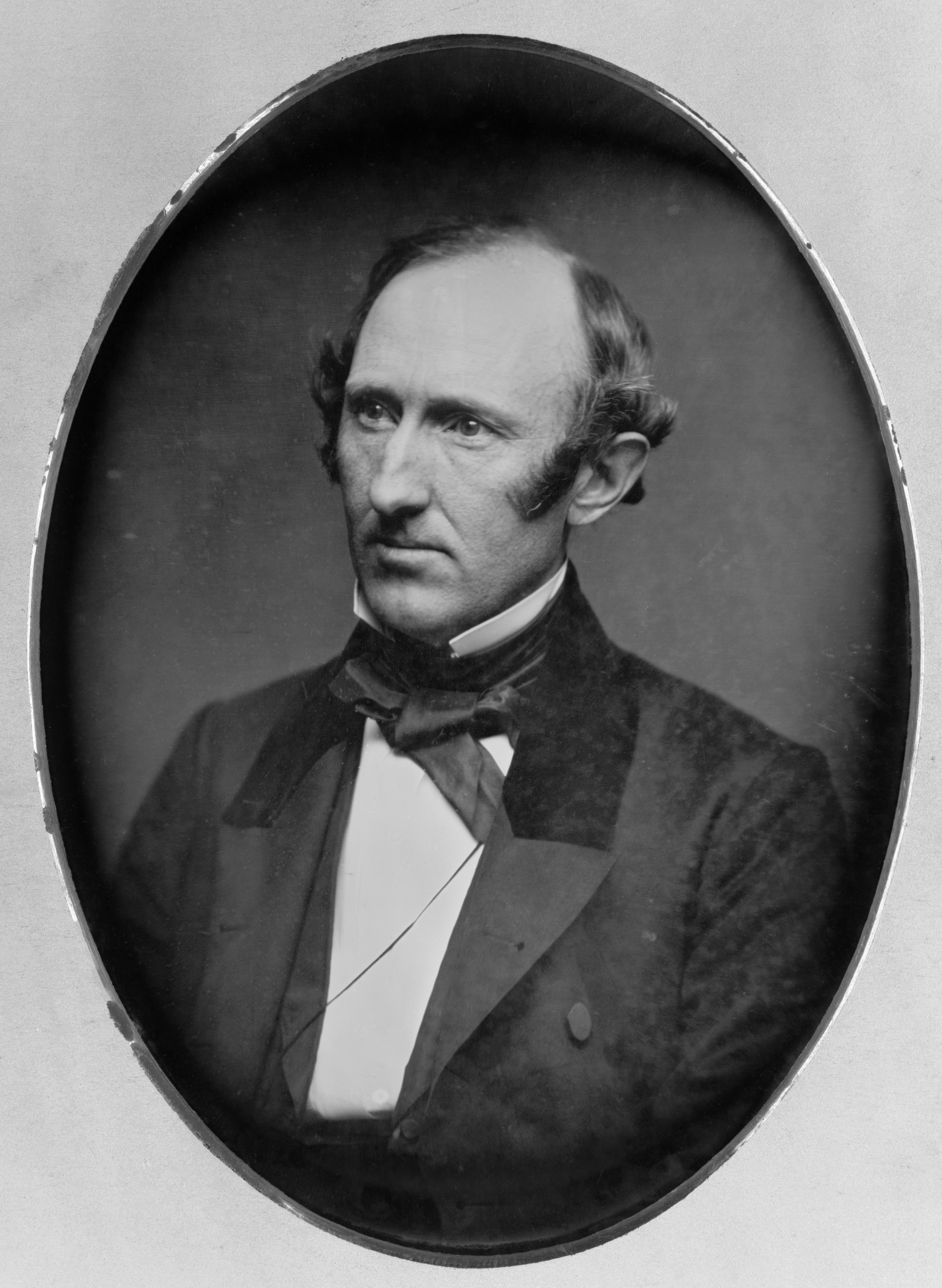
Wendell Phillips

In a variation of the idea proposed earlier to the Anti-Slavery Society, the convention voted to transform itself into a new organization called the American Equal Rights Association (AERA) that would campaign for the rights of both women and blacks, advocating suffrage for both. The new organization elected Lucretia Mott as president and created an executive committee that included Stanton, Anthony and Lucy Stone. The AERA launched lobbying and petition campaigns in several states, hoping to create a drive strong enough to convince the Anti-Slavery Society to accept its goal of universal suffrage rather than suffrage for black men only.

=== 1867 annual meeting ===
The AERA held its first annual meeting in New York City on May 9, 1867. Referring to the growing demand for suffrage for African American men, Lucretia Mott, the AERA's president, said, "woman had a right to be a little jealous of the addition of so large a number of men to the voting class, for the colored men would naturally throw all their strength upon the side of those opposed to woman's enfranchisement." Asked by George T. Downing, an African American, whether she would be willing for the black man to have the vote before woman, Elizabeth Cady Stanton replied, "I would say, no; I would not trust him with all my rights; degraded, oppressed himself, he would be more despotic with the governing power than even our Saxon rulers are. I desire that we go into the kingdom together". Sojourner Truth, a former slave, said that, "if colored men get their rights, and not colored women theirs, you see the colored men will be masters over the women, and it will be just as bad as it was before."

Others disagreed. Abby Kelley Foster said that suffrage for black men was a more pressing issue than suffrage for women. Stephen Symonds Foster, arguing that ballot rights for one group of citizens should not be contingent on ballot rights for another, said, "The right of each should be accorded at the earliest possible moment, neither being denied for any supposed benefit to the other." Henry Ward Beecher, a prominent minister, said he was in favor of universal suffrage but believed that by demanding the vote for both blacks and women, the movement was likely to achieve at least a partial victory by winning the vote for black men.

=== New York campaign ===
The state of New York organized a convention in June 1867 to revise its constitution. AERA workers prepared for it by organizing meetings in over 30 locations around the state and collecting over 20,000 signatures on petitions that supported women's suffrage and the removal of property requirements that discriminated specifically against black voters. The suffrage committee of the convention was chaired by Horace Greeley, a prominent newspaper editor and abolitionist who had been a supporter of the women's movement. His committee approved the removal of discriminatory property requirements for black voters but rejected the proposal for women's suffrage.

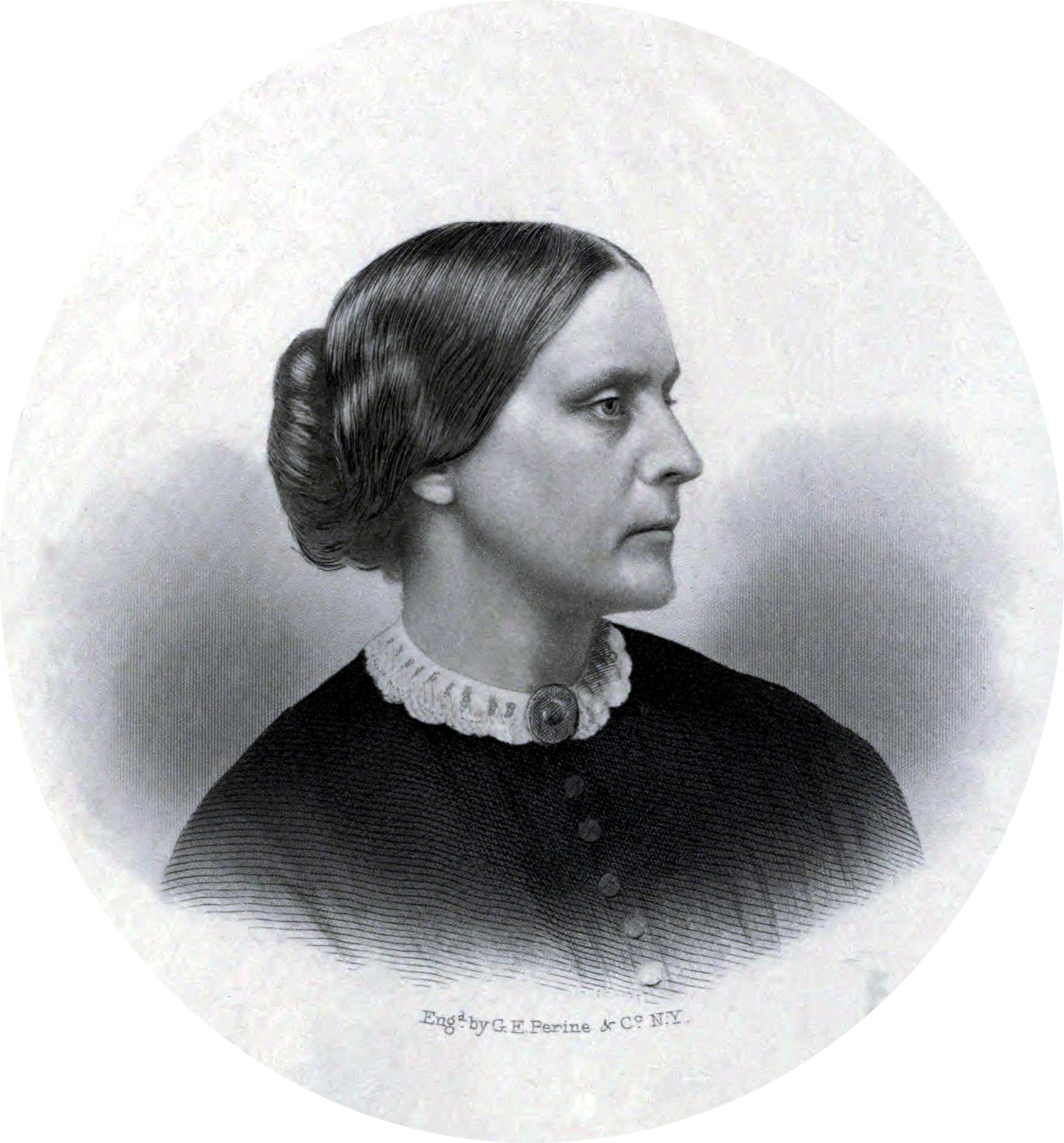
Susan B. Anthony

Greeley had earlier clashed with Anthony and Stanton by insisting that their New York campaign should focus on the rights of African Americans rather than also including women's issues. When they refused, he threatened to end his newspaper's support for their work. Soon he began to attack the women's movement. Responding to Greeley's repeated claim that the best women he knew did not want to vote, Stanton and Anthony arranged for it to be announced from the floor of the convention that Mrs. Horace Greeley had signed the petition in favor of women's suffrage. The History of Woman Suffrage, whose authors include Stanton and Anthony, said, "This campaign cost us the friendship of Horace Greeley and the support of the New York Tribune, heretofore our most powerful and faithful allies."

=== Kansas campaign ===
Two referendums were placed before voters in Kansas in 1867, one that would extend suffrage to black men and one that would extend it to women. Kansas had an anti-slavery heritage and the strongest laws for the protection of women's rights outside New York. The AERA concentrated its resources on this campaign with high hopes of winning both referendums, which would boost the chances of winning suffrage for both blacks and woman at the national level. Both referendums failed, however, and the AERA campaign ended in disarray and recrimination. The Kansas campaign created divisions between those who worked primarily for the rights of African Americans and those who worked primarily for the rights of women, and it also created divisions within the women's movement itself.

The New York campaign had been financed partly by the Hovey Fund, which was created by a bequest that provided a large sum of money to support abolitionism, women's rights and other reform movements. According to the terms of the bequest, if slavery was abolished, the remainder of the money was to go to the other reform movements, which meant that the ratification of the Thirteenth Amendment should have freed up a significant stream of money for the women's movement. However, Wendell Phillips, the head of the fund, declared that slavery would not truly be abolished until blacks were enfranchised on the same basis as whites, and he channeled much of fund's money toward that cause. The AERA nonetheless expected the Hovey Fund to support its Kansas campaign, which worked for the enfranchisement of both African Americans and women. The fund refused to finance the Kansas campaign, however, because Phillips opposed mixing those two causes, leaving the campaign desperately short of money. It was difficult for the women's movement itself to raise enough money for projects like this because few women had independent sources of income, and even those with employment generally were required by law to turn over their pay to their husbands.

The AERA's Kansas campaign began when Lucy Stone and Henry Blackwell arrived in April. The AERA workers were disconcerted when, after an internal struggle, Kansas Republicans decided to support suffrage for black men only, not merely refusing to support women's suffrage but forming an "Anti Female Suffrage Committee" to organize opposition to those who were campaigning for it. In a letter to Anthony, Stone wrote, "But the negroes are all against us. There has just now left us an ignorant black preacher named Twine, who is very confident that women ought not to vote. These men ought not to be allowed to vote before we do, because they will be just so much more dead weight to lift." By the end of summer the AERA campaign had almost collapsed under the weight of Republican hostility, and its finances were exhausted.

Susan B. Anthony and Elizabeth Cady Stanton arrived in September to work on the campaign. They created a storm of controversy by accepting help during the last two and a half weeks of the campaign from George Francis Train, a Democrat, a wealthy businessman and a flamboyant speaker who supported women's rights. Train was a political maverick who had attended the Democratic convention during the presidential election year of 1864 but then campaigned vigorously for the Republican candidate, Abraham Lincoln. By 1867 he was promoting himself as an independent candidate for president. Train was also a racist who openly disparaged the integrity and intelligence of African Americans, supporting women's suffrage partly in the belief that the votes of women would help contain the political power of blacks. The usual procedure was for Anthony to speak first, declaring that the ability to vote rightfully belonged to both women and blacks. Train would speak next, declaring that it would be an outrage for blacks to vote but not women also.

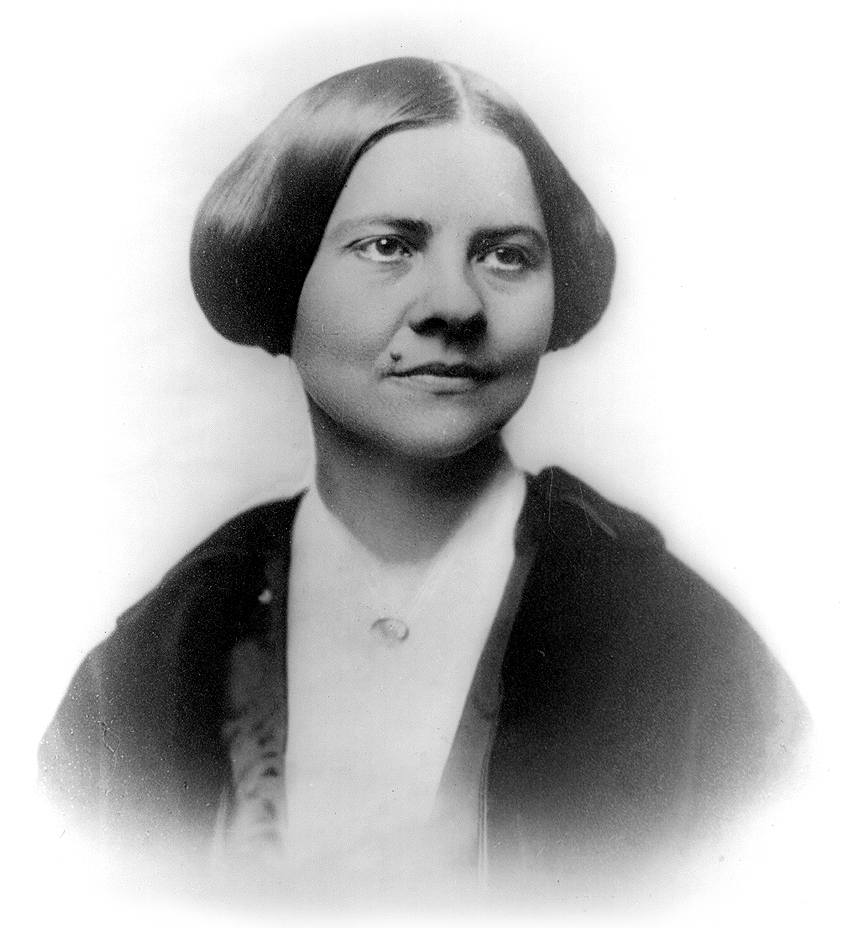
Lucy Stone

The willingness of Anthony and Stanton to work with Train alienated many AERA members and other reform activists. Stone said she considered Train to be "a lunatic, wild and ranting". Anthony and Stanton angered Stone by including her name, without her permission, in a public letter praising Train. Stone and her allies angered Anthony by charging her with misuse of funds, a charge that was later disproved, and by blocking payment of her salary and expenses for her work in Kansas.

Opposition to Train was not due solely to his racism. Henry Blackwell, Stone's husband, had just demonstrated that even AERA workers were not automatically free from the racial presumptions of that era by publishing an open letter to Southern legislatures assuring them that if they allowed both blacks and women to vote, "the political supremacy of your white race will remain unchanged" and that "the black race would gravitate by the law of nature toward the tropics." Opposition to Train was partly due to the loyalty many reformers felt to the national Republican Party, which had provided political leadership for the elimination of slavery and was still in the difficult process of consolidating that victory. Train harshly attacked the Republican Party, making no secret of his desire to blemish its progressive image and create splits within it by campaigning for women's rights when Kansas Republicans were refusing to do so.

The abolitionist movement was sensitive to attacks on the Republican Party, with which it collaborated closely, serving in some ways as its left wing. The women's rights movement depended heavily on abolitionist resources, with its articles published in their newspapers and some of its funding provided by abolitionists. After the Kansas debacle, women's suffragists who distanced themselves from abolitionist and Republican leadership found those resources increasingly unavailable. Wendell Phillips worked to prevent discussion of women's suffrage at abolitionist meetings, and abolitionist journals began to downplay those issues as well.

The History of Woman Suffrage stated the conclusions drawn by the wing of the movement associated with Anthony and Stanton: "Our liberal men counseled us to silence during the war, and we were silent on our own wrongs; they counseled us again to silence in Kansas and New York, lest we should defeat 'negro suffrage,' and threatened if we were not, we might fight the battle alone. We chose the latter, and were defeated. But standing alone we learned our power... woman must lead the way to her own enfranchisement."

=== Disagreement and division ===
After the Kansas campaign ended in disarray in November 1867, the AERA increasingly divided into two wings, both advocating universal suffrage but with different approaches. One wing, whose leading figure was Lucy Stone, was willing for black men to achieve suffrage first and wanted to maintain close ties with the Republican Party and the abolitionist movement. The other, whose leading figures were Elizabeth Cady Stanton and Susan B. Anthony, insisted that women and black men should be enfranchised at the same time and worked toward a politically independent women's movement that would no longer be dependent on abolitionists. Stanton and Anthony expressed their views in a newspaper called The Revolution, which began publishing in January 1868 with initial funding from the controversial George Francis Train.

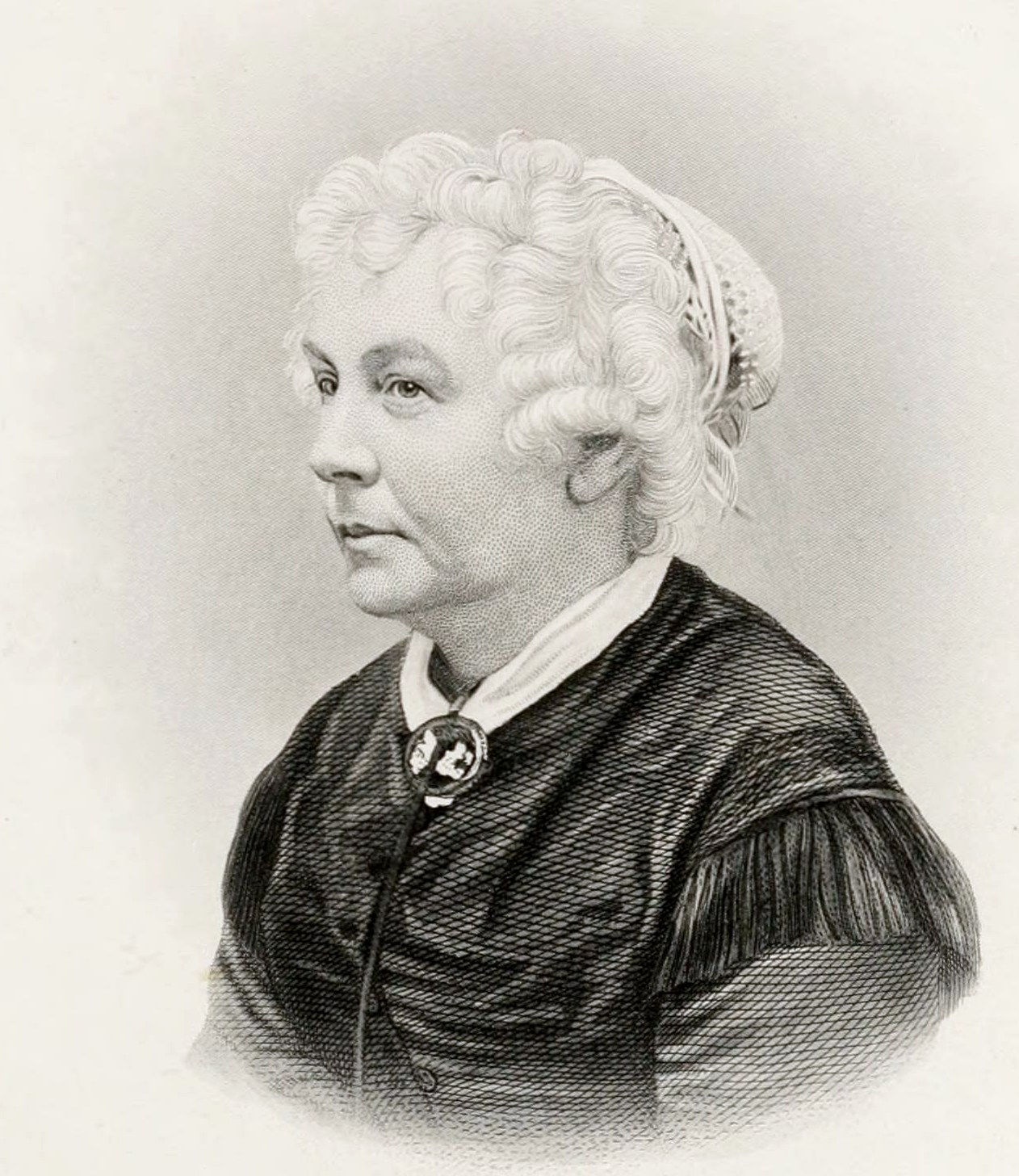
Elizabeth Cady Stanton

Disagreement was especially sharp over the proposed Fifteenth Amendment, which would prohibit the denial of suffrage because of race. In practice it would, theoretically at least, guarantee suffrage for virtually all males. Anthony and Stanton opposed passage of the amendment unless it was accompanied by a Sixteenth Amendment that would guarantee suffrage for women. Otherwise, they said, it would create an "aristocracy of sex" by giving constitutional authority to the belief that men were superior to women. Male power and privilege was at the root of society's ills, Stanton argued, and nothing should be done to strengthen it. Anthony and Stanton also warned that black men, who would have voting power under the amendment, were overwhelmingly opposed to women's suffrage. (They were not alone in being unsure of black male support for women's suffrage. Frederick Douglass, a strong supporter of women's suffrage, said, "The race to which I belong have not generally taken the right ground on this question.")

Most AERA members supported the Fifteenth Amendment. Among prominent African American AERA members, Frances Ellen Watkins Harper, Frederick Douglass, George Downing and Dr. Charles Purvis supported the amendment, but Dr. Purvis' father, Robert Purvis, joined Anthony and Stanton in opposition to it. Congress approved the Fifteenth Amendment in February 1869, and it was ratified by the states a year later.

During the debate over the Fifteenth Amendment, Stanton wrote articles for The Revolution with language that was sometimes elitist and racially condescending. She believed that a long process of education would be needed before what she called the "lower orders" of former slaves and immigrant workers would be able to participate meaningfully as voters. Stanton wrote, "American women of wealth, education, virtue and refinement, if you do not wish the lower orders of Chinese, Africans, Germans and Irish, with their low ideas of womanhood to make laws for you and your daughters ... demand that women too shall be represented in government." After first saying in another article, "There is only one safe, sure way to build a government, and that is on the equality of all its citizens, male and female, black and white", Stanton then objected to laws being made for women by "Patrick and Sambo and Hans and Yung Tung who do not know the difference between a Monarchy and a Republic".

Anthony and Stanton also attacked the Republican Party and worked to develop connections with the Democrats. They wrote a letter to the 1868 Democratic National Convention that criticized Republican sponsorship of the Fourteenth Amendment (which granted citizenship to black men but introduced the word "male" into the Constitution), saying, "While the dominant party has with one hand lifted up two million black men and crowned them with the honor and dignity of citizenship, with the other it has dethroned fifteen million white women—their own mothers and sisters, their own wives and daughters—and cast them under the heel of the lowest orders of manhood." They urged liberal Democrats to convince their party, which did not have a clear direction at that point, to embrace universal suffrage. Their attempt to collaborate with Democrats did not go far, however, because their politics were too pro-black for the Democratic Party of that era. Despite the growing number of Democratic leaders who advocated the acceptance of black political power in the South, Southern Democrats had already begun the process of re-establishing white supremacy there, including violent suppression of the voting rights of blacks.

Several AERA members expressed anger and dismay over the activities of Stanton and Anthony during this period, including their deal with Train that gave him space to express his views in The Revolution. Some, including Lucretia Mott, president of the organization, and African Americans Frederick Douglass and Frances Harper, voiced their disagreements with Stanton and Anthony but continued to maintain working relationships with them. Particularly in the case of Lucy Stone, however, the disputes of this period led to a personal rift, one that had important consequences for the women's movement.

To counter the initiatives of Anthony and Stanton, a planning committee was formed in May 1868 to organize a pro-Republican women's suffrage organization in the Boston area that would support the proposal to enfranchise black males first. The New England Woman Suffrage Association was subsequently founded in November 1868. Several participants in new organization were also active in the AERA, including Lucy Stone, Frederick Douglass and the Fosters. Prominent Republican politicians were involved in the founding meeting, including a U.S. senator who was seated on the platform. Francis Bird, a leading Massachusetts Republican, said at the meeting, "Negro suffrage, being a paramount question, would have to be settled before woman suffrage could receive the attention it deserved." Julia Ward Howe, who was elected president of the new organization, said she would not demand suffrage for women until it was achieved for blacks.

=== 1868 annual meeting ===
The AERA accomplished little during 1868 except hold its annual meeting on May 14, which was marked by hostilities. At that meeting, Olympia Brown denounced the Kansas Republicans for opposing women's suffrage and stressed the need for a party that would support universal suffrage. Lucy Stone criticized the Republican Party also, but Frederick Douglass defended it as more supportive of suffrage for both blacks and women than the Democrats.

Distressed at Stanton's and Anthony's association with George Francis Train and the hostilities it had generated, Lucretia Mott resigned as president of the AERA that same month. She said she thought it had been mistake to attempt to unite the women's and abolitionist movements, and she recommended that the AERA be disbanded.

=== 1869 annual meeting ===
At the climactic AERA annual meeting on May 12, 1869, Stephen Symonds Foster objected to the renomination of Stanton and Anthony as officers. He denounced their willingness to associate with Train despite his disparagement of blacks, and he charged them with advocating "Educated Suffrage", thereby repudiating the AERA's principle of universal suffrage. Henry Blackwell responded, "Miss Anthony and Mrs. Stanton believe in the right of the negro to vote. We are united on that point. There is no question of principle between us." Frederick Douglass objected to Stanton's use of "Sambo" to represent black men in an article she had written for The Revolution.

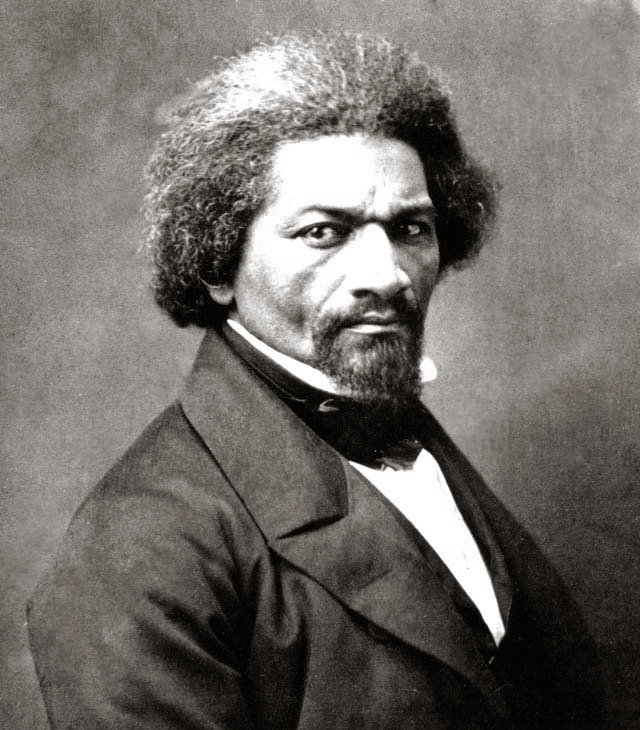
Frederick Douglass

The majority of the attendees supported the pending Fifteenth Amendment, but debate was contentious. Douglass said, "I do not see how anyone can pretend that there is the same urgency in giving the ballot to woman as to the negro. With us, the matter is a question of life and death, at least in fifteen States of the Union." Anthony replied, "Mr. Douglass talks about the wrongs of the negro; but with all the outrages that he to-day suffers, he would not exchange his sex and take the place of Elizabeth Cady Stanton."

Lucy Stone disagreed with Douglass's assertion that suffrage for blacks should have precedence, saying that "woman suffrage is more imperative than his own." Referring to Douglass's earlier assertion that "There are no KuKlux Clans seeking the lives of women", Stone cited state laws that gave men control over the disposition of their children, saying that children had been known to have been taken from their mothers by "Ku-Kluxers here in the North in the shape of men". Stone supported the Fifteenth Amendment and at the same time stressed the importance of women's rights by saying, "But I thank God for that XV. Amendment, and hope that it will be adopted in every State. I will be thankful in my soul if any body can get out of the terrible pit. But I believe that the safety of the government would be more promoted by the admission of woman as an element of restoration and harmony than the negro."

=== Demise and aftermath ===
The acrimonious 1869 meeting signaled the effective demise of the American Equal Rights Association, which held no further annual membership meetings. The split in the women’s movement soon became entrenched through the creation of rival organizations. Two days after the meeting, Susan B. Anthony and Elizabeth Cady Stanton led the formation of the National Woman Suffrage Association (NWSA). In November 1869, Lucy Stone, Julia Ward Howe and others formed the American Woman Suffrage Association (AWSA).

Many activists, especially from the Midwest, were distressed by the split and sought ways to overcome it. Theodore Tilton, an abolitionist and women’s rights advocate, organized a petition drive that gathered the names of more than a thousand people who wanted reunification. He then announced that members of the NWSA and AWSA would meet in New York in April 1870 to reunite the women’s movement. The leaders of both these organizations angrily opposed Tilton’s project at first. The NWSA eventually decided to cooperate with him, but the AWSA did not. Tilton’s meeting, which included some non-affiliated activists, led to the creation of the Union Woman Suffrage Association (UWSA) with Tilton as president. The NWSA merged into the UWSA, resulting in an organization with structure and policies that mirrored those of the NWSA.

The AERA still existed although it was no longer an effective organization. Twenty leaders of the AERA, including Stanton, Anthony, Tilton and Stone, met in executive committee on May 14, 1870, to formally end its existence. Stone wanted the AERA simply to be dissolved, but the majority voted to merge its remnants into the UWSA. That organization itself had a short life. In 1872, the UWSA was converted into a reconstituted NWSA with the same name as the original organization and with Anthony as its president.

Attitudes toward the Fifteenth Amendment formed a key distinction between the two rival suffrage organizations, but there were other differences as well. The NWSA took a stance of political independence, but the AWSA at least initially maintained close ties with the Republican Party, expecting the ratification of the Fifteenth Amendment to open the way for a Republican push for women's suffrage. (That did not happen; the high point of Republican support was a non-committal reference to women's suffrage in the 1872 Republican platform.) The NWSA worked on a wider range of women's issues than the AWSA, which criticized its rival for mixing women's suffrage with issues like divorce reform and equal pay for women. Almost all members of the NWSA were women, as were all of its officers, but the AWSA actively sought male support and included men among its officers. Stanton and Anthony, the leading figures in the NWSA, were more widely known as leaders of the women's suffrage movement during this period and were more influential in setting its direction.

Events soon removed the basis for two key differences of principle between the competing women's organizations. In 1870 debate about the Fifteenth Amendment was made irrelevant when that amendment was officially ratified. In 1872 disgust with corruption in government led to a mass defection of abolitionists and other social reformers from the Republicans to the short-lived Liberal Republican Party. Despite these events, the rivalry between the two women's groups was so bitter that a merger proved to be impossible for twenty years. Ellen Carol DuBois, a historian of the women's suffrage movement, says this rivalry had far-reaching consequences for the women's movement: "More than a century has passed, and still historians become partisans in the hostilities that their opposition created."

In 1890 the NWSA and the AWSA combined to form the National American Woman Suffrage Association (NAWSA), with Stanton, Anthony and Stone as its top officers. Anthony was the key force in the new organization. Stone, nominally the chair of its executive committee, in practice was involved only peripherally.

Women's suffrage, a key goal of the AERA, was achieved in 1920 with the ratification of the Nineteenth Amendment, popularly known as the Susan B. Anthony Amendment. Despite the passage of the Fifteenth and Nineteenth Amendments, the AERA's goal of securing equal rights for all citizens, especially suffrage, still had not yet been fully achieved. Although Puerto Ricans were by law citizens of the United States, Puerto Rican women were prevented from voting until 1929, and African Americans in southern states were for the most part prevented from voting until 1965, nearly a hundred years after the AERA was formed.

== See also ==
- History of women's suffrage in the United States
- List of African-American abolitionists
- List of major women's suffrage organizations
- List of suffragists and suffragettes
- List of women's rights activists
- List of women's rights organizations
- Reconstruction era
- Timeline of women's rights (other than voting)
- Timeline of women's suffrage
- Voting rights in the United States
