= Hovey Fund =

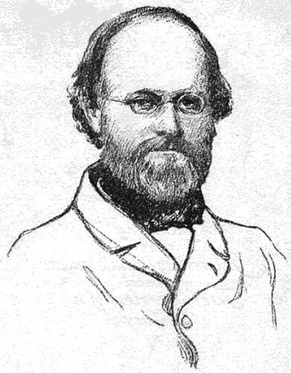
Charles Fox Hovey

The Hovey Fund was created by a bequest from Charles Fox Hovey (1807–1859), a Boston merchant who supported a variety of social reform movements. Hovey left $50,000 to support abolitionism and other types of social reform, including "women's rights, non-resistance, free trade and temperance." Hovey appointed a committee of trustees to administer the fund, headed by abolitionist Wendell Phillips. Hovey specified that the funds should be spent at the rate of $8,000 per year to meet immediate needs.

The fund paid Susan B. Anthony's salary ($12 per week) while she coordinated the Women's Loyal National League's massive petition drive asking Congress to approve an amendment that would abolish slavery. With 400,000 signatures, it was the largest petition drive in the nation's history up to that time, gathering signatures from approximately one out every twenty-four adults in the Northern states and significantly contributing to the passage of the Thirteenth Amendment to the U.S. Constitution.

Hovey was one of a group of Boston businessmen who had provided most of the funding for the American Anti-Slavery Society in the years prior to the American Civil War. During and after the war the Hovey fund helped to sustain the Anti-Slavery Society as fund-raising became more difficult and the cost of publishing abolitionist newspapers increased sharply. After slavery in the U.S. was abolished by the Thirteenth Amendment, the fund's continued support assisted the Anti-Slavery Society's campaign for the political rights of the newly freed slaves, playing a crucial role in the passage of the Fourteenth Amendment and Fifteenth Amendments, which secured citizenship and voting rights for African Americans.

A controversy over the fund developed after the Thirteenth Amendment was ratified. Hovey's will stipulated that if slavery was abolished before the fund's money was exhausted, the remainder was to be channeled to other specified reform movements, including the women's rights movement. Despite the fact that the Thirteenth Amendment abolished slavery in 1865, Phillips declared that slavery would not truly be abolished until African Americans secured the right to vote, and he continued to channel much of the fund's money to that cause. Leaders of the women's movement were furious at being denied money that rightfully belonged to them, especially when they desperately needed it to finance what they had hoped would be a pivotal campaign in Kansas by the American Equal Rights Association to achieve suffrage for all state citizens regardless of race or sex.
