= National Women's Rights Convention =

Annual conference of political activists in late 19th-century United States

The National Women's Rights Convention was an annual series of meetings that increased the visibility of the early women's rights movement in the United States. First held in 1850 in Worcester, Massachusetts, the National Women's Rights Convention combined both female and male leadership and attracted a wide base of support including temperance advocates and abolitionists. Speeches were given on the subjects of equal wages, expanded education and career opportunities, women's property rights, marriage reform, and temperance. Chief among the concerns discussed at the convention was the passage of laws that would give women the right to vote.

== Background ==
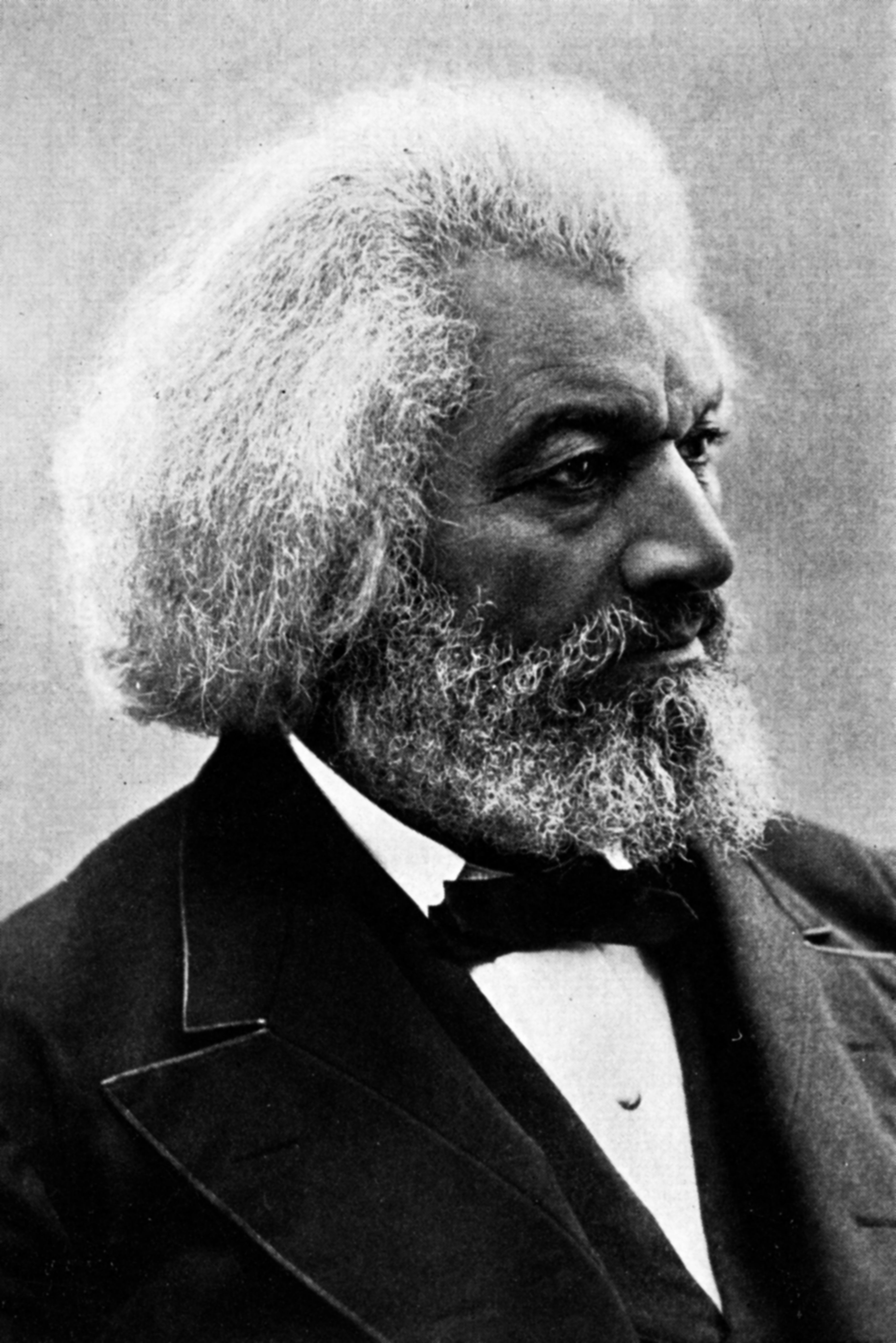
Frederick Douglass was strongly in favor of women's right to vote.

=== Seneca Falls Convention ===
In 1840, Lucretia Mott and Elizabeth Cady Stanton traveled with their husbands to London for the first World Anti-Slavery Convention, but they were not allowed to participate because they were women. Mott and Stanton became friends there and agreed to organize a convention to further the cause of women's rights. It was not until the summer of 1848 that Mott, Stanton, and three other women organized the Seneca Falls Convention, the first women's rights convention. It was attended by some 300 people over two days, including about 40 men. The resolution on the subject of votes for women caused dissension until Frederick Douglass took the platform with a passionate speech in favor of having a suffrage statement within the proposed Declaration of Sentiments. One hundred of the attendees subsequently signed the Declaration.

=== Other early women's rights conventions ===
Signers of the Declaration hoped for "a series of Conventions, embracing every part of the country" to follow their own meeting. Because of the fame and drawing power of Lucretia Mott, who would not be visiting the Upstate New York area for much longer, some of the participants at Seneca Falls organized another regional meeting two weeks later, the Rochester Women's Rights Convention of 1848, featuring many of the same speakers. The first women's rights convention to be organized on a statewide basis was the Ohio Women's Convention at Salem in 1850.

=== Planning ===
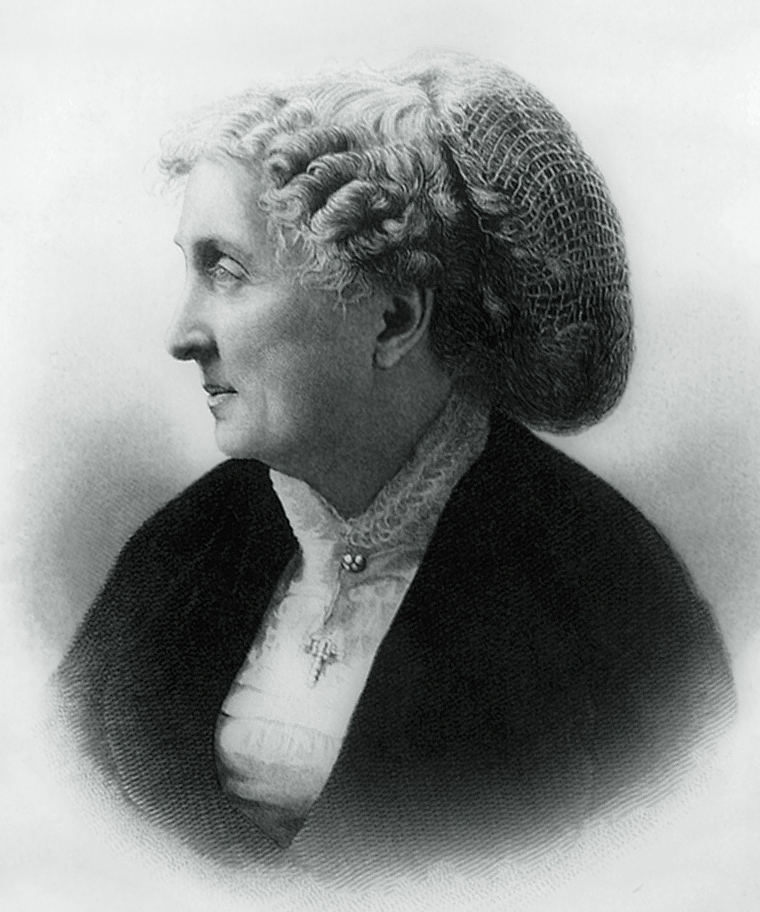
Paulina Kellogg Wright Davis helped organize and presided over the first two conventions, and was president of the Central Committee for most of the decade.

In April 1850, Ohio women held a convention to begin petitioning their constitutional convention for women's equal legal and political rights. Lucy Stone, who had agitated for women's rights while a student at Ohio's Oberlin College and begun lecturing on women's rights after graduating in 1847, wrote to the Ohio organizers pledging Massachusetts to follow their lead.

At the end of the New England Anti-Slavery Convention on May 30, 1850, an announcement was made that a meeting would be held to consider whether to hold a woman's rights convention. That evening, Paulina Kellogg Wright Davis presided over a large meeting in Boston's Melodeon Hall, while Lucy Stone served as secretary. Stone, Henry C. Wright, William Lloyd Garrison, and Samuel Brooke spoke of the need for such a convention. Garrison, whose name had headed the first woman suffrage petition sent to the Massachusetts legislature the previous year, said, "I conceive that the first thing to be done by the women of this country is to demand their political enfranchisement. Among the 'self-evident truths' announced in the Declaration of Independence is this – 'All government derives its just power from the consent of the governed.'" The meeting decided to call a convention and set Worcester, Massachusetts, as the place and October 16 and 17, 1850, as the date. It appointed Davis, Stone, Abby Kelley Foster, Harriot Kezia Hunt, Eliza J. Kenney, Dora Taft, and Eliza H. Taft a committee of arrangements, with Davis and Stone as the committee of correspondence.

Davis and Stone asked William Elder, a retired Philadelphia physician, to draw up the convention call while they set about securing signatures to it and lining up speakers. "We need all the women who are accustomed to speak in public – every stick of timber that is sound," Stone wrote to Antoinette Brown, a fellow Oberlin student who was preparing for the ministry. On Davis's list to contact was Elizabeth Cady Stanton, who sent her regrets along with a letter of support and a speech to be read in her name. Stanton wished to stay at home because she would be in the late stages of pregnancy.

After completing her part of the correspondence, Stone went to Illinois to visit a brother. Within days of her arrival, he died of cholera and Stone was left to settle his affairs and accompany his pregnant widow back east. Fearing she might not be able to return for three months, she wrote to Davis asking her to take charge of issuing the call. The call began appearing in September, with the convention date pushed back one week and Stone's name heading the list of eighty-nine signatories: thirty-three from Massachusetts, ten from Rhode Island, seventeen from New York, eighteen from Pennsylvania, one from Maryland, and nine from Ohio. While the call began circulating, Stone lay near death in a roadside inn. Having decided not to tarry in the disease-ridden Wabash Valley, she had begun a stagecoach trek back across Indiana with her sister-in-law, and within days contracted typhoid fever that kept her bed-ridden for three weeks. She arrived back in Massachusetts in October, just two weeks before the convention.

== 1850 in Worcester ==
The first National Women's Rights Convention met in Brinley Hall in Worcester, Massachusetts, on October 23–24, 1850. Some 900 people showed up for the first session, men forming the majority, with several newspapers reporting over a thousand attendees by the afternoon of the first day, and more turned away outside. Delegates came from eleven states, including one delegate from California – a state only a few weeks old.

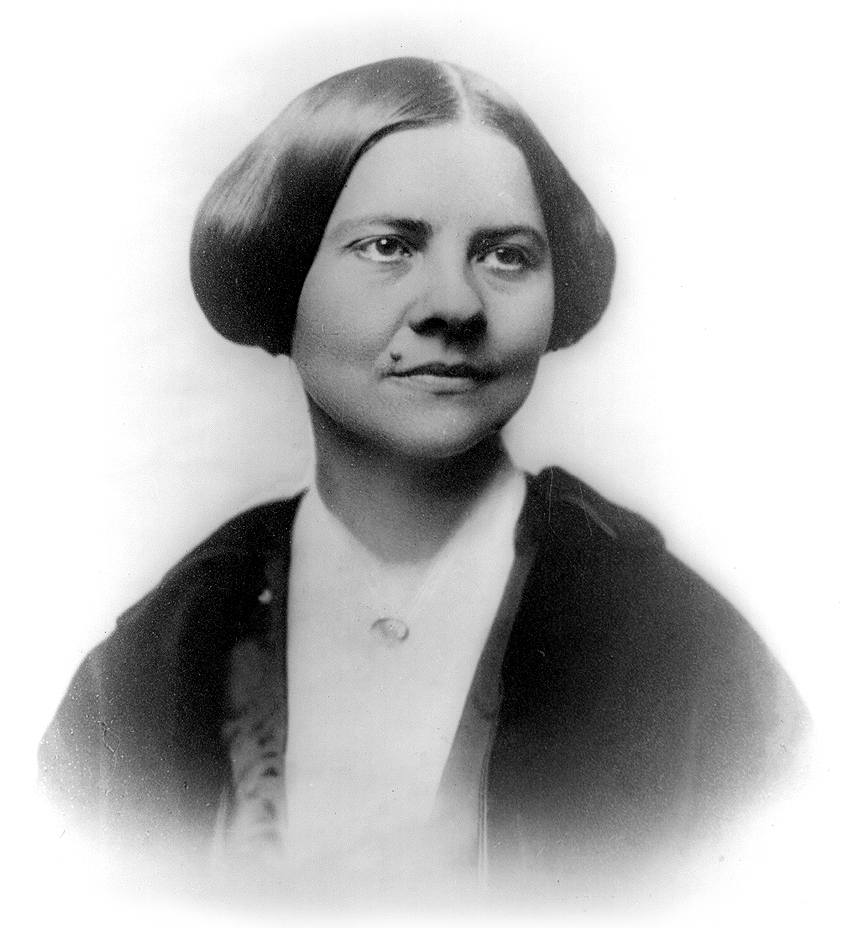
Lucy Stone helped organize the first eight national conventions, presided over the seventh and was secretary of the Central Committee for most of the decade.

The meeting was called to order by Sarah H. Earle, a leader in Worcester's antislavery organizations. Paulina Wright Davis was chosen to preside and in her opening address called for "the emancipation of a class, the redemption of half the world, and a conforming re-organization of all social, political, and industrial interests and institutions".

The first resolution from the business committee defined the movement's objective: "to secure for [woman] political, legal, and social equality with man until her proper sphere is determined by what alone should determine it, her powers and capacities, strengthened and refined by an education in accordance with her nature". Another set of resolutions put forth women's claim for equal civil and political rights and demanded that the word "male" be stricken from every state constitution. Others addressed specific issues of property rights, access to education, and employment opportunities, while others defined the movement as an effort to secure the "natural and civil rights" of all women, including women held in slavery.

The convention considered how best to organize to promote their goals. Mindful of many members' opposition to organized societies, Wendell Phillips said there was no need for a formal association or founding document: annual conventions and a standing committee to arrange them was organization enough, and resolutions adopted at the conventions could serve as a declaration of principles. Reflecting its egalitarian principles, the business committee appointed a Central Committee of nine women and nine men. It also appointed committees on Education, Industrial Avocations, Civil and Political Functions, and Social Relations to gather and publish information useful for guiding public opinion toward establishing "Woman's co-equal sovereignty with Man".

Convention speakers included William Lloyd Garrison, William Henry Channing, Wendell Phillips, Harriot Kezia Hunt, Ernestine Rose, Antoinette Brown, Sojourner Truth, Stephen Symonds Foster, Abby Kelley Foster, Abby H. Price, Lucretia Mott, and Frederick Douglass. Stone served on the business committee and did not speak until the final evening. As an appointee to the committee on Civil and Political Functions, she urged the assemblage to petition their state legislatures for the right of suffrage, the right of married women to hold property, and as many other specific rights as they felt practical to seek in their respective states. Then she gave a brief speech, saying, "We want to be something more than the appendages of Society; we want that Woman should be the coequal and help-meet of Man in all the interest and perils and enjoyments of human life. We want that she should attain to the development of her nature and womanhood; we want that when she dies, it may not be written on her gravestone that she was the "relict" of somebody."

Susan B. Anthony, who was not at the convention, later said it was reading this speech that converted her to the cause of women's rights.

Stone paid to have the proceedings of the convention printed as booklets; she would repeat this practice after each of the next six annual conventions. The booklets were sold at her lectures and at subsequent conventions as Woman's Rights Tracts.

The report of the convention in the New York Tribune for Europe inspired women in Sheffield, England, to draw up a petition for woman suffrage and present it to the House of Lords and Harriet Taylor Mill in 1851 to write The Enfranchisement of Women. Harriet Martineau wrote a letter to Davis in August 1851 to thank her for sending a copy of the proceedings: "I hope you are aware of the interest excited in this country by that Convention, the strongest proof of which is the appearance of an article on the subject in the Westminster Review ... I am not without hope that this article will materially strengthen your hands, and I am sure it can not but cheer your hearts."

== 1851 in Worcester ==
A second national convention was held October 15–16, 1851, again in Brinley Hall, with Paulina Kellogg Wright Davis presiding. Harriet Kezia Hunt and Antoinette Brown gave speeches, while a letter from Elizabeth Cady Stanton was read. Lucretia Mott served as an officer of the meeting.

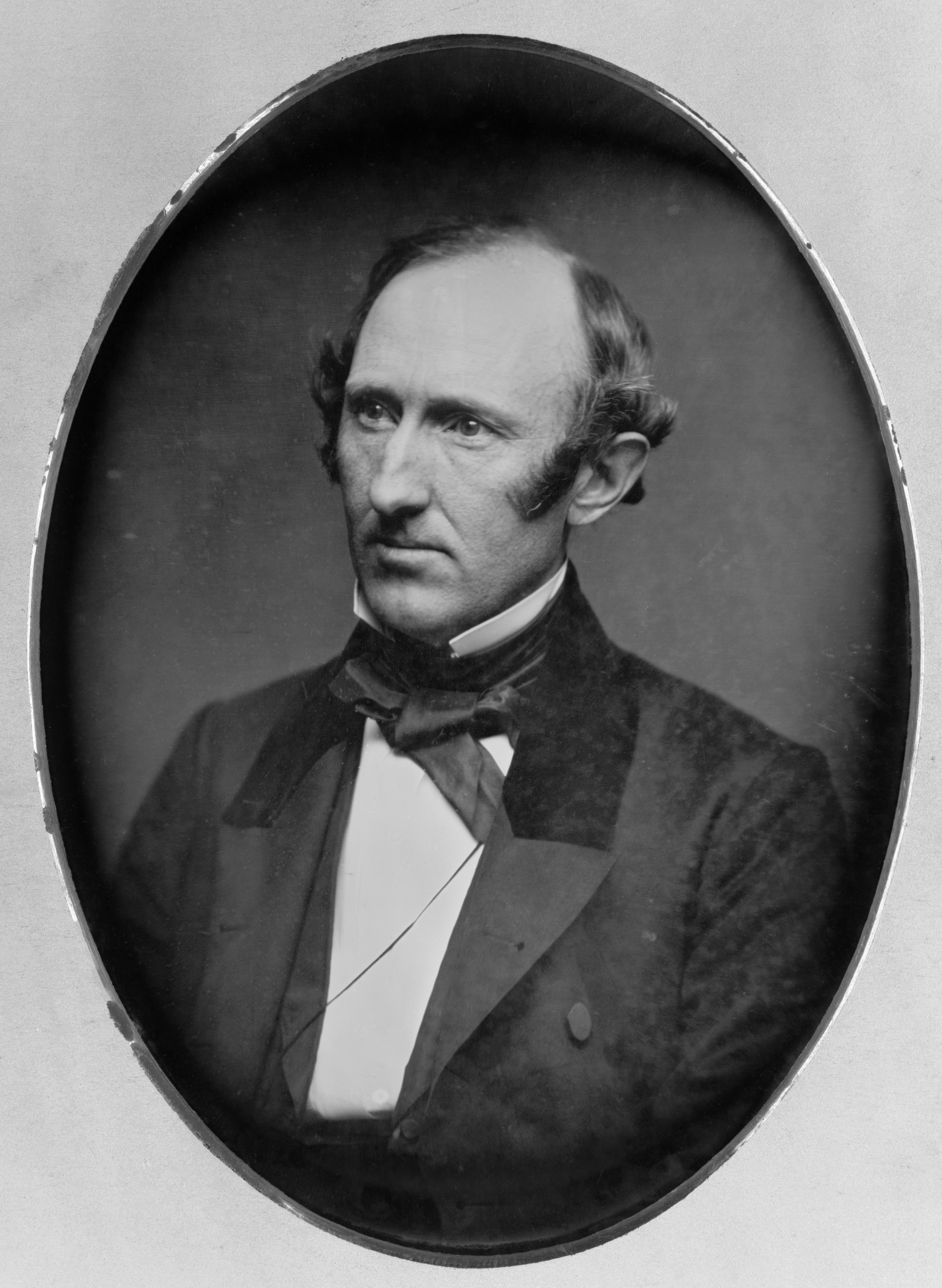
Wendell Phillips spoke powerfully at many conventions, and was in charge of the finances.

Wendell Phillips made a speech which was so persuasive that it would be sold as a tract until 1920:

Throw open the doors of Congress; throw open those court-houses; throw wide open the doors of your colleges, and give to the sisters of the De Staëls and the Martineaus the same opportunity for culture that men have, and let the results prove what their capacity and intellect really are. When a woman has enjoyed for as many centuries as we have the aid of books, the discipline of life, and the stimulus of fame, it will be time to begin the discussion of these questions: 'What is the intellect of woman? Is it equal to that of man?'

Elizabeth Oakes Smith, journalist, author, and member of New York's literary circle attended the 1850 convention, and in 1851 was asked to take the platform. Afterward, she defended the convention and its leaders in articles she wrote for the New York Tribune.

Abby Kelley Foster gave testimony to the persecution she had suffered as a woman: "My life has been my speech. For fourteen years I have advocated this cause by my daily life. Bloody feet, sisters, have worn smooth the path by which you have come hither." Abby H. Price spoke about prostitution, as she had the year before, arguing that too many women fell to prostitution because they did not have the job opportunities or education that men had.

A letter was read from two imprisoned French feminists, Pauline Roland and Jeanne Deroin, saying "Your courageous declaration of Woman's Rights has resounded even to our prison, and has filled our souls with inexpressible joy."

Ernestine Rose gave a speech about the loss of identity in marriage that Davis later characterized as "unsurpassed". Rose said of woman that "At marriage, she loses her entire identity, and her being is said to have become merged in her husband. Has nature thus merged it? Has she ceased to exist and feel pleasure and pain? When she violates the laws of her being, does her husband pay the penalty? When she breaks the moral law does he suffer the punishment? When he satisfies his wants, is it enough to satisfy her nature? ... What an inconsistency that from the moment she enters the compact in which she assumes the high responsibility of wife and mother, she ceases legally to exist and becomes a purely submissive being. Blind submission in women is considered a virtue, while submission to wrong is itself wrong, and resistance to wrong is virtue alike in women as in man."

== 1852 in Syracuse ==
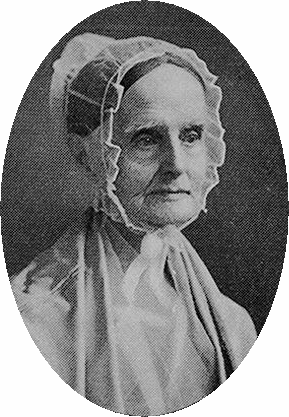
Lucretia Mott was a guiding light of the conventions, and presided over two of them.

For the third convention, the city hall in Syracuse, New York, was selected as the site. Because Syracuse was nearer to Seneca Falls (two days' travel by horse, several hours' journey by rail), more of the original signers of the Declaration of Sentiments were able to attend than the previous two conventions in Massachusetts. Lucretia Mott was named president; at one point she felt it necessary to silence a minister who offended the assembly by using biblical references to keep women subordinate to men. A letter from Elizabeth Cady Stanton was read and its resolutions voted on. At sessions taking place September 8–10, 1852, Susan B. Anthony and Matilda Joslyn Gage made their first public speeches on women's rights. Ernestine Rose spoke denouncing duties without rights, saying "as a woman has to pay taxes to maintain government, she has a right to participate in the formation and administration of it." Antoinette Brown called for more women to become ministers, claiming that the Bible did not forbid it. Ernestine Rose stood up in response, saying that the Bible should not be used as the authority for settling a dispute, especially as it contained much contradiction regarding women. Elizabeth Oakes Smith called for women to have their own journal so that they could become independent of the male-owned press, saying "We should have a literature of our own, a printing press and a publishing house, and tract writers and distributors, as well as lectures and conventions; and yet I say this to a race of beggars, for women have no pecuniary resources." Antoinette Brown lectured about how masculine law can never fully represent womankind. Lucy Stone wore a trousered dress often referred to as "bloomers", a more practical style she had picked up during the summer after meeting Amelia Bloomer. She spoke to say "The woman who first departs from the routine in which society allows her to move must suffer. Let us bravely bear ridicule and persecution for the sake of the good that will result, and when the world sees that we can accomplish what we undertake, it will acknowledge our right." The Syracuse Weekly Chronicle was impressed less by her costume than by her electrifying address, printing "Well, whether we like it or not, little woman, God made you an ORATOR!"

Reverend Lydia Ann Jenkins of Geneva, New York, spoke at the convention and asked, "Is there any law to prevent women from voting in this State? The Constitution says 'white male citizens' may vote, but does not say that white female citizens may not." The next year, Jenkins was chosen member of the committee tasked with framing the issue of suffrage before the New York Legislature.

A motion was made to form a national organization for women, but after animated discussion, no consensus was reached. Elizabeth Smith Miller suggested the women form organizations at the state level, but even this milder suggestion met with opposition. Paulina Kellogg Wright Davis said, "I hate organizations ... they cramp me." Lucretia Mott concurred, saying "the seeds of dissolution be less likely to be sown." Angelina Grimké Weld, Thomas M'Clintock and Wendell Phillips agreed, with Phillips saying "you will develop divisions among yourselves." No national organization was to form until after the Civil War.

== 1853 in Cleveland ==
At Melodeon Hall in Cleveland, Ohio, on October 6–8, 1853, William Lloyd Garrison spoke to say "...the Declaration of Independence as put forth at Seneca Falls. ... was measuring the people of this country by their own standard. It was taking their own words and applying their own principles to women, as they have been applied to men."

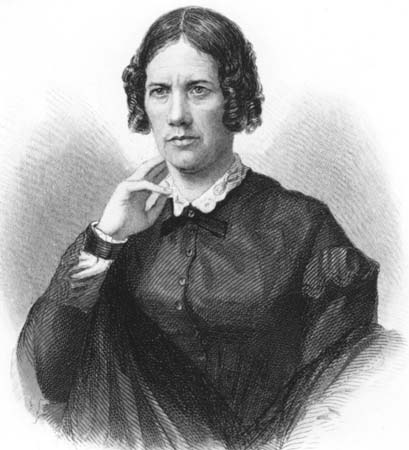
Frances Dana Barker Gage was surprised to be chosen president, saying "...I have never in my life attended a regular business meeting ..."

Earlier in the year, a regional Women's Rights Convention in New York City had been interrupted by unruly men in the audience, with most of the speakers being unheard over shouts and hisses. Organizers of the fourth national convention were concerned that a repetition of that mob scene does not take place. In Cleveland, objections were raised regarding Bible interpretations, and orderly discussion proceeded.

Frances Dana Barker Gage served as president for the 1,500 participants. Lucretia Mott, Amy Post, and Martha Coffin Wright served as officers; James Mott served on the business committee, and Lucretia Mott called the meeting to order.

In a letter read aloud, William Henry Channing suggested that the convention issue its own Declaration of Women's Rights and petitions to state legislatures seeking woman suffrage, equal inheritance rights, equal guardianship laws, divorce for wives of alcoholics, tax exemptions for women until given the right to vote, and right to trial before a jury of female peers. Lucretia Mott moved the adoption of the Seneca Falls Declaration of Sentiments, which was read to the convention, debated, then referred to a committee to draft a new declaration. Antoinette Brown, William Lloyd Garrison, Lucretia Mott, Ernestine Rose and Lucy Stone worked to shape a new declaration, and the result was read at the end of the meeting, but was never adopted.

The Plain Dealer printed an extensive account of the convention, opining of Ernestine Rose that she "is the master-spirit of the Convention. She is described as a Polish lady of great beauty, being known in this country as an earnest advocate of human liberty." After commenting on the bloomer costume worn by Lucy Stone, The Plain Dealer continued: "Miss Stone must be set down as a lady of no common abilities, and of uncommon energy in the pursuit of a cherished idea. She is a marked favorite in the Conventions."

== 1854 in Philadelphia ==
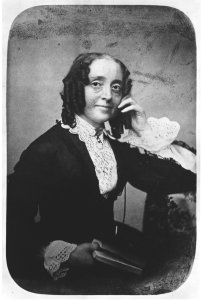
Ernestine Louise Rose spoke at many conventions, and was chosen president in 1854.

At Sansom Street Hall in Philadelphia, Pennsylvania, over three days October 18–20, 1854, Ernestine Rose was chosen president in spite of her atheism. Susan B. Anthony supported her, saying "every religion – or none – should have an equal right on the platform". Rose spoke out to the gathering, saying "Our claims are based on that great and immutable truth, the rights of all humanity. For is woman not included in that phrase, 'all men are created ... equal'?. ... Tell us, ye men of the nation ... whether woman is not included in that great Declaration of Independence?" She continued "I will no more promise how we shall use our rights than man has promised before he obtained them, how he would use them."

Susan B. Anthony spoke to urge attendees to petition their state legislatures for laws giving women equal rights. A committee was formed to publish tracts and to place articles in national newspapers. Once again, the convention could not agree on a motion to create a national organization, resolving instead to continue work at the local level with coordination provided by a committee chaired by Paulina Kellogg Wright Davis.

Henry Grew took the speaker's platform to condemn women who demanded equal rights. He described examples from the Bible which assigned to women a subordinate role. Lucretia Mott flared up and debated him, saying that he was selectively using the Bible to put upon women a sense of order that originated in man's mind. She said "The pulpit has been prostituted, the Bible has been ill-used ... Instead of taking the truths of the Bible in corroboration of the right, the practice has been to turn over its pages to find examples and authority for the wrong." Mott cited Bible passages that proved Grew wrong. William Lloyd Garrison stood up to halt the debate, saying that nearly everyone present agreed that all were equal in the eyes of God.

== 1855 in Cincinnati ==
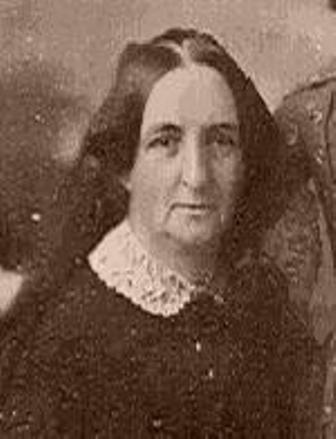
Martha Coffin Wright served twice as president.

At Smith & Nixon's Hall in Cincinnati, Ohio, on October 17–18, 1855, Martha Coffin Wright presided over the standing room only crowd. Wright, a younger sister of Lucretia Mott and a founding member of the first Seneca Falls Convention, contrasted the large hall packed with supporters to the much smaller gathering in 1848, called "in timidity and doubt of our own strength, our own capacity, our own powers".

Antoinette Brown, Ernestine Rose, Josephine Sophia White Griffing and Frances Dana Barker Gage spoke to the crowd, listing for them the achievements and progress made thus far. Lucy Stone spoke for the right of each person to establish for themselves which sphere, domestic or public, they should be active in. A heckler interrupted the proceedings, calling female speakers "a few disappointed women". Stone responded with a retort that became widely quoted, saying that yes, she was indeed a "disappointed woman". "...In education, in marriage, in religion, in everything, disappointment is the lot of woman. It shall be the business of my life to deepen this disappointment in every woman's heart until she bows down to it no longer."

== 1856 in New York ==
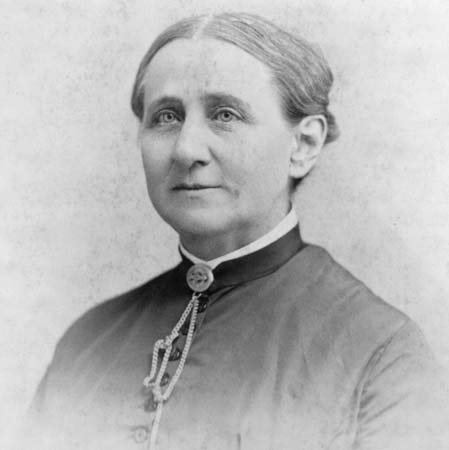
Antoinette Brown Blackwell was the first female minister ordained in the United States.

At the Broadway Tabernacle in New York City on November 25–26, 1856, Lucy Stone served as president, and recounted for the crowd the recent progress in women's property rights laws passing in nine states, as well as a limited ability for widows in Kentucky to vote for school board members. She noted with satisfaction that the new Republican Party was interested in female participation during the 1856 elections. Lucretia Mott encouraged the assembly to use their new rights, saying, "Believe me, sisters, the time is come for you to avail yourselves of all the avenues that are opened to you."

A letter was read aloud from Antoinette Brown Blackwell: "Would it not be wholly appropriate, then, for this National Convention to demand the right of suffrage for her from the Legislature of each State in the Nation? We can not petition the General Government on this point. Allow me, therefore, respectfully to suggest the propriety of appointing a committee, which shall be instructed to prepare a memorial adapted to the circumstances of each legislative body; and demanding of each, in the name of this Convention, the elective franchise for woman." A motion was passed approving of the suggestion, and Wendell Phillips recommended that women in each state be contacted and encouraged to take the memorial petition to their respective legislative bodies.

== 1858 in New York ==
For the eighth and subsequent national conventions, the meetings were changed from various dates in autumn to a more consistent mid-May schedule. 1857 was skipped – the next meeting was held in 1858. At Mozart Hall in New York City on May 13–14, 1858, Susan B. Anthony held the post of president. William Lloyd Garrison spoke, saying "Those who have inaugurated this movement are worthy to be ranked with the army of martyrs ... in the days of old. Blessings on them! They should triumph, and every opposition be removed, that peace and love, justice and liberty, might prevail throughout the world." Garrison proposed not only that women should serve as elected officials, but that the number of female legislators should equal that of male.

Frederick Douglass took the stage to speak after repeated calls from the audience. Lucy Stone, Reverend Antoinette Brown Blackwell (now married to Samuel Charles Blackwell), Reverend Thomas Wentworth Higginson and Lucretia Mott were among those that spoke. Stephen Pearl Andrews startled the assemblage by advocating free love and unconventional approaches to marriage. He hinted at birth control by insisting that women should have the right to put a limit on "the cares and sufferings of maternity". Eliza Farnham presented her view that women were superior to men, a concept that was hotly debated. The convention, marred by interruption and rowdyism, "adjourned amid great confusion".

== 1859 in New York ==
Held again at Mozart Hall in New York City on May 12, 1859, the ninth national convention opened with Lucretia Mott presiding. Caroline Wells Healey Dall read out the resolutions including one intended to be sent to every state legislature, urging that body to "secure to women all those rights and privileges and immunities which in equity belong to every citizen of a republic".

Another unruly crowd made it difficult to hear the speeches of Antoinette Brown Blackwell, Caroline Dall, Lucretia Mott and Ernestine Rose. Wendell Phillips stood to speak and "held that mocking crowd in the hollow of his hand".

== 1860 in New York ==
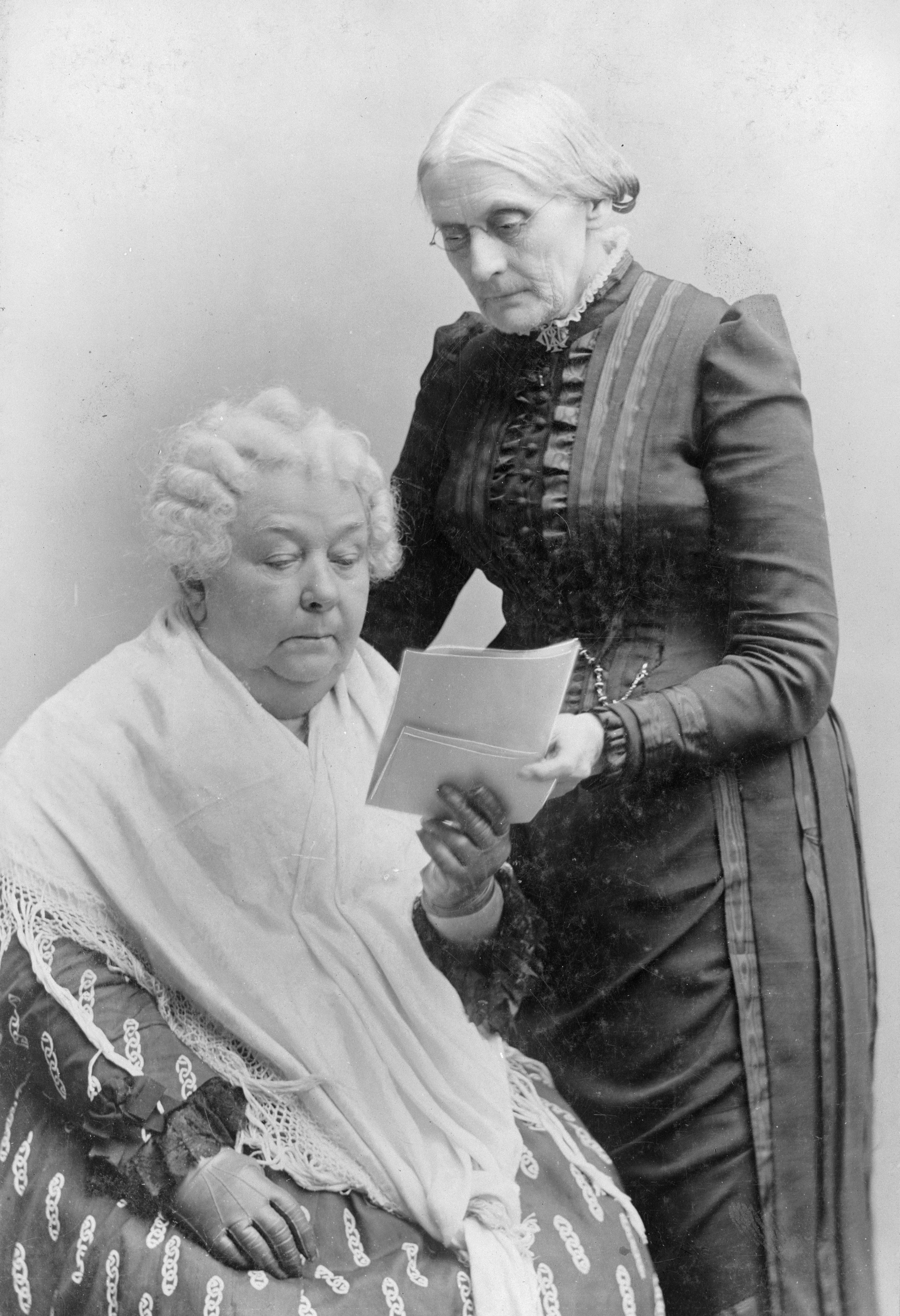
Elizabeth Cady Stanton and Susan B. Anthony helped establish the first national organization of women, the Woman's National Loyal League.

At the Cooper Union in New York City on May 10–11, 1860, the tenth national convention of 600–800 attendees was presided over by Martha Coffin Wright. A recent legislative victory in New York was praised, one which gave women joint custody of their children and sole use of their personal property and wages.

Elizabeth Cady Stanton and Antoinette Brown Blackwell moved to add a resolution calling for legislation on marriage reform; they wanted laws that would give women the right to separate from or divorce a husband who had demonstrated drunkenness, insanity, desertion or cruelty. Wendell Phillips argued against the resolution, fracturing the executive committee on the matter. Susan B. Anthony also supported the measure, but it was defeated by vote after a heated debate.

Horace Greeley wrote in the Tribune that there were "One Thousand Persons Present, seven-eighths of them Women, and a fair Proportion Young and Good-looking". Greeley, a foe of marriage reform, continued against Stanton's proposed resolution with a jab at "easy Divorce", writing that the word 'Woman' should be replaced in the convention's title with "Wives Discontented".

== Civil War and beyond ==
The coming of the American Civil War ended the annual National Women's Rights Convention and focused women's activism on the issue of emancipation for slaves. The New York state legislature repealed in 1862 much of the gain women had made in 1860. Susan B. Anthony was "sick at heart" but could not convince women activists to hold another convention focusing solely on women's rights.

In 1863, Elizabeth Cady Stanton recently moved to New York City to join with Susan B. Anthony to send a call out, via the woman's central committee chaired by Paulina Kellogg Wright Davis, to all the "Loyal Women of the Nation" to meet again in convention in May. Forming the Woman's National Loyal League were Stanton, Anthony, Martha Coffin Wright, Amy Post, Antoinette Brown Blackwell, Ernestine Rose, Angelina Grimké Weld, and Lucy Stone, among others. They organized the First Woman's National Loyal League Convention at the Church of the Puritans in New York City on May 14, 1863, and worked to gain 400,000 signatures by 1864 to petition the United States Congress to pass the Thirteenth Amendment abolishing slavery.

=== 1866 in New York ===
On May 10 of 1866, the Eleventh National Women's Rights Convention was held at Church of the Puritans in Union Square. Called by Stanton and Anthony, the meeting included Ernestine L. Rose, Wendell Phillips, Reverend John T. Sargent, Reverend Octavius Brooks Frothingham, Frances D. Gage, Elizabeth Brown Blackwell, Theodore Tilton, Lucretia Mott, Martha C. Wright, Stephen Symonds Foster and Abbey Kelley Foster, Margaret Winchester and Parker Pillsbury, and was presided over by Stanton.

A stirring speech against racial discrimination was given by African-American activist Frances Ellen Watkins Harper, in which she said "You white women speak here of rights. I speak of wrongs. I, as a colored woman, have had in this country an education which has made me feel as if I were in the situation of Ishmael, my hand against every man, and every man's hand against me."

A few weeks later, on May 31, 1866, the first meeting of the American Equal Rights Association was held in Boston.

=== 1869 in Washington, D.C. ===
An event that was reported as "The twelfth regular National Convention of Women's Rights" was held on January 19, 1869. Prominent speakers included Lucretia Mott, Elizabeth Cady Stanton, Susan B. Anthony, Senator Samuel Clarke Pomeroy, Parker Pillsbury, John Willis Menard and Doctor Sarah H. Hathaway. Doctor Mary Edwards Walker and a "Mrs. Harman" were seen in "male attire" actively passing back and forth between the audience and the stage.

Stanton spoke heatedly with a prepared speech against those who had established "an aristocracy of sex on this continent". "If serfdom, peasantry, and slavery have shattered kingdoms, deluged continents with blood, scattered republics like dust before the wind, and rent our own Union asunder, what kind of a government, think you, American statesmen, you can build, with the mothers of the race crouching at your feet ... ?" Other speeches were off-the-cuff, and little record is known of them.

== See also ==
- "Ain't I a Woman?" speech by Sojourner Truth, delivered in 1851 at the Ohio Women's Rights Convention in Akron, Ohio
- Committee on Women's Rights and Gender Equality
- Convention on the Elimination of All Forms of Discrimination Against Women (CEDAW)
- Equal Rights Amendment (ERA)
- Feminism
- First-wave feminism
- History of feminism
- In Defense of Women
- League of Women Voters
- List of suffragists and suffragettes
- Ohio Women's Convention at Salem in 1850
- Parental leave
- Pennsylvania Woman's Convention at West Chester in 1852
- Reproductive rights – issues regarding "reproductive freedom"
- Seneca Falls Convention
- Subjection of women
- Timeline of women's rights (other than voting)
- Timeline of women's suffrage
- Vindication of the Rights of Women
- Women's right to know
- Women's suffrage in the United States
- Women's suffrage organizations
