= Echo Lake (band) =

- Origin: London, England
- Genres: Indie rock, indie pop, dream pop, shoegaze, psychedelic pop, ambient
- Years active: 2010–present
- Labels: Slumberland records No Pain In Pop
- Website: Echolakeband.com

Echo Lake is an English indie pop band formed in London in 2010. Their debut EP Young Silence was released through No Pain In Pop in 2011 and their debut album Wild Peace was released in June 2012 through Slumberland Records and No Pain In Pop. Their second album, Era, was released in March 2015.

The band is centred on the songwriting partnership of singer Linda Jarvis and producer-guitarist Thom Hill. Critics have identified dream pop and shoegazing elements in their sound. Ex-choirgirl Jarvis' voice and Hill's unique production style have both received acclaim.

The current band line-up consists of Linda Jarvis on vocals and keyboards, Thom Hill on guitar, Will Young on bass guitar and Dayo James on drums. Original drummer Peter Hayes died in June 2012. Kier Finnegan and Steven Green are also founding members of the group.

== Reception ==
The critical reception for Wild Peace was strong. The album was called "something striking, singular and mercurial" in a 9 out of 10 review at Drowned In Sound; "a rather extraordinary sonic party full of elegiac beauty" in The Line Of Best Fit's 9 out of 10 review; "dazzling, hypnotic, deliriously seductive and gloriously prodigious" in Clash Magazine's 8 out of 10 review; and "effortless" in a 4 out of 5 review from The Times.

The album was Rough Trade Shops' Album of the Week, and listed in NME's Top 75 Records of 2012, at number #8 in The Line Of Best Fit's Records of 2012, and in the top 60 of Drowned In Sound's Albums Of 2012.

== US radio play ==
Wild Peace reached the US College Radio Charts Top 10, peaking at #7 in the CMJ Top 200.

== Discography ==
=== Studio albums ===
- Wild Peace (No Pain In Pop/Slumberland Records, 2012)
- Era (No Pain In Pop, 2015)

=== EPs ===
- Young Silence (No Pain in Pop, 2011)

=== Singles ===
- "Another Day" / "Breathe Deep" (No Pain In Pop, 2011)
- "Alisa" (Ariel Pink cover) (web release, 2011)

=== Remixes ===
- "Peaking Lights" - Marshmallow Yellow (Echo Lake remix) (Web release, 2012)
- "Fairewell" - Born Under A Bad Sign (Echo Lake remix) (Web release, 2011)
- "Saint Saviour" - Red Sun (Echo Lake remix) (Web release, 2011)

== Personnel ==
Current:
Linda Jarvis - vocals, keyboards
Thom Hill - guitar
Will Young - bass guitar
Dayo James - drums

2010 formation to mid-2012:
Linda Jarvis - vocals, keyboards
Thom Hill - guitar
Kier Finnegan - guitar
Steven Green - bass guitar
Peter Hayes - drums
