= Education Reform Act =

Education Reform Act may refer to:

- Education Reform Act 1988 in the UK
- Mississippi Education Reform Act of 1982
- Kentucky Education Reform Act, 1990
- Massachusetts Education Reform Act of 1993
