= Eras =

Eras or ERAS may refer to:

- A plural for era, a specific period of time
- Committee for a Radical Left Rally, a political organisation in the Republic of Cyprus
- Electronic Residency Application Service, in the United States
- Eras (typeface), a typeface
- The Eras Tour, a concert tour by Taylor Swift, or may refer to the timeline of her albums discography

== See also ==
- Era (disambiguation)
