= Era (Echo Lake album) =

Studio album by Echo Lake
- Released: 2 March 2015
- Genre: Indie pop, dream pop, shoegazing, ambient, psychedelic pop
- Length: 44:28
- Label: No Pain in Pop

Echo Lake chronology
Wild Peace (2012)	Era (2015)

Professional ratings
Aggregate scores
Source	Rating
Metacritic	76/100
Review scores
Source	Rating
AllMusic	4/5 stars

Era is the second studio album by the indie pop band Echo Lake. It was released in 2015 on No Pain in Pop.

== Track listing ==
No.	Title	Length
1.	"Light Sleeper"	6:56
2.	"Waves"	6:25
3.	"Era"	4:53
4.	"Dröm"	8:01
5.	"Sun"	4:24
6.	"Nothing Lasts"	3:34
7.	"Heavy Dreaming"	10:15
