= EraMobile =

EraMobile (Epidemic-based Reliable and Adaptive Multicast for Mobile ad hoc networks) is a bio-inspired reliable multicast protocol targeting mission critical ad hoc networks. EraMobile supports group applications that require high reliability and low overhead with loose delivery time constraints. The protocol aims to deliver multicast data with maximum reliability and minimal network overhead under adverse network conditions.

== Functionality ==
EraMobile adopts an epidemic-based approach, which uses gossip messages, to cope with dynamic topology changes due to the mobility of network nodes. EraMobile's epidemic mechanism does not require maintaining any tree- or mesh-like structure for multicast operation. It requires neither a global nor a partial view of the network, nor does it require information about neighboring nodes and group members.

The lack of a central structure for multicast lowers the network overhead by eliminating redundant data transmissions. EraMobile contains a simple adaptivity mechanism which tunes the frequency of control packages based on the node density in the network. This adaptivity mechanism helps the delivery of data reliably in both sparse networks -in which network connectivity is prone to interruptions- and dense networks -in which congestion is likely because of shared wireless medium-.
