= Electronic remittance advice =

An electronic remittance advice (ERA) is an electronic data interchange (EDI) version of a medical insurance payment explanation. It provides details about providers' claims payment, and if the claims are denied, it would then contain the required explanations. The explanations include the denial codes and the descriptions, which present at the bottom of ERA. ERA are provided by plans to Providers. In the United States the industry standard ERA is HIPAA X12N 835 (HIPAA = Health Insurance Portability and Accountability Act; X12N = insurance subcommittees of ASC X12; 835 is the specific code number for ERA), which is sent from insurer to provider either directly or via a bank.

== See also ==
- Remittance advice
