= Massachusetts Education Reform Act of 1993 =

The Massachusetts Education Reform Act (MERA) of 1993 was an act of legislation passed in Massachusetts that "greatly increased the state's role in [a] funding public education and in [b] guiding the local education process." Over a 7-year period, MERA mandated several modern educational reforms, among them: the introduction of charter schools and the use of the MCAS standardized test. MERA is based on Outcomes Based Education.
