= Women's Loyal National League =

US anti-slavery campaigning group

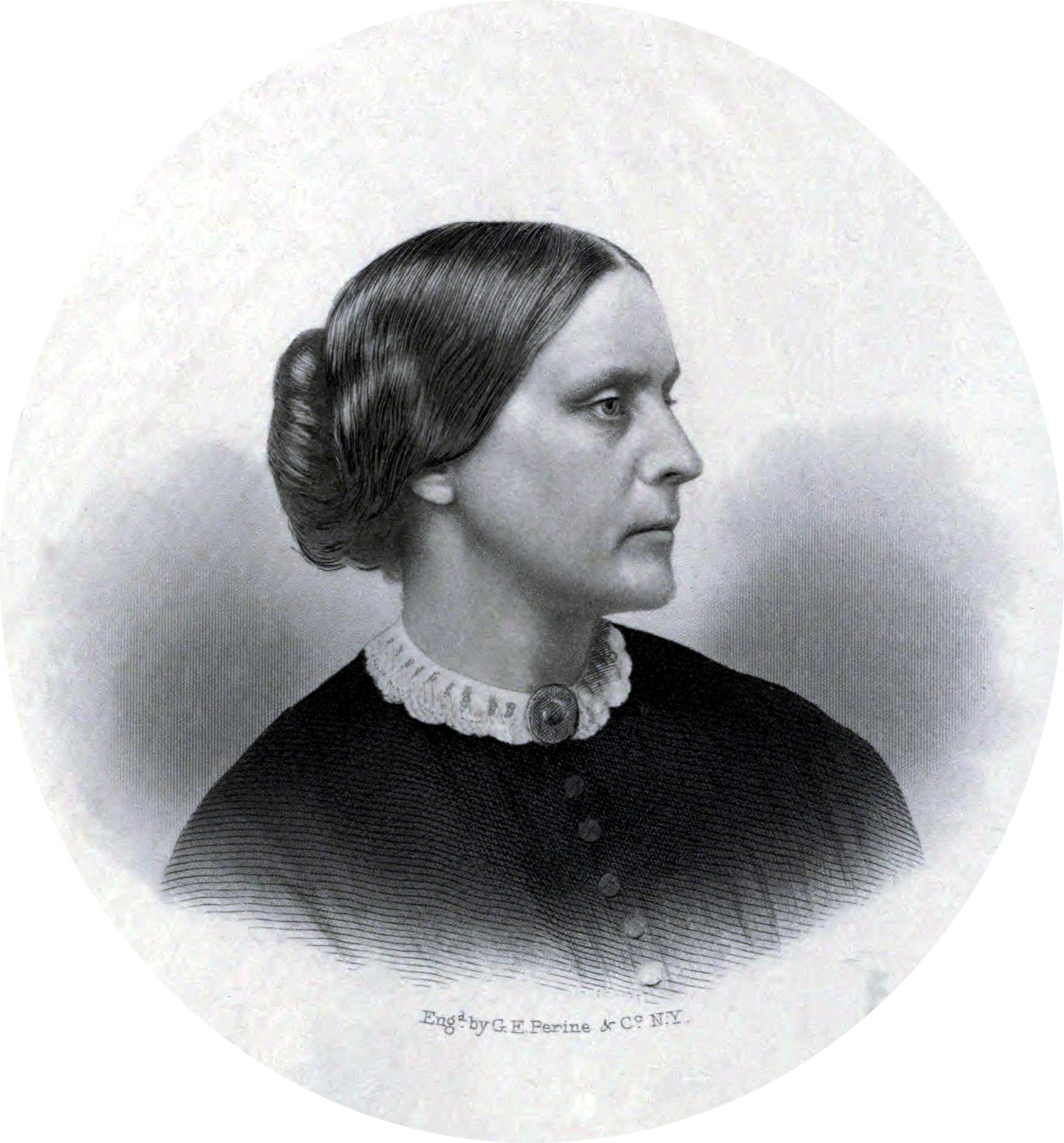
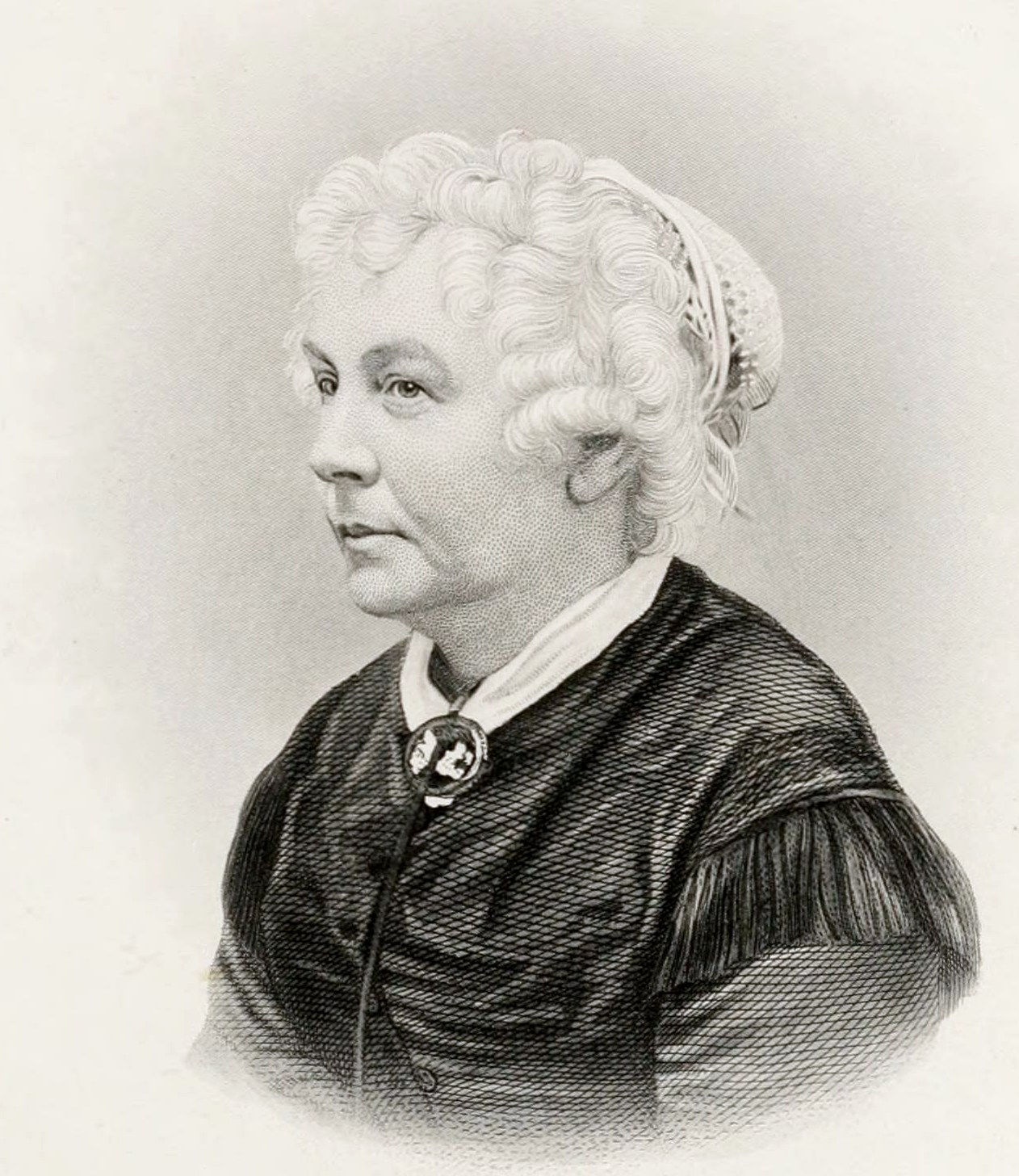
Susan B. Anthony about 1855, left; Elizabeth Cady Stanton before 1869, right

The Women's Loyal National League, also known as the Woman's National Loyal League and other variations of that name, was formed on May 14, 1863, to campaign for an amendment to the U.S. Constitution that would abolish slavery. It was organized by Elizabeth Cady Stanton, its president, and Susan B. Anthony, its secretary. In the largest petition drive in the nation's history up to that time, the League collected nearly 400,000 signatures on petitions to abolish slavery and presented them to Congress. Its petition drive significantly assisted the passage of the Thirteenth Amendment, which ended slavery in the U.S. The League disbanded in August 1864 after it became clear that the amendment would be approved.

The League was the first national women's political organization in the United States. It marked a continuation of the shift of women's activism from what was called "moral suasion" to political action, and from a women's movement that was loosely structured to one that was more formally organized. It also contributed to the development of a new generation of leaders and activists for the women's movement.

== History ==
The Women's Loyal National League was formed on May 14, 1863, in New York City to organize support for an amendment to the U.S. Constitution that would abolish slavery. The country was in the midst of the American Civil War at the time, with slavery a key issue.

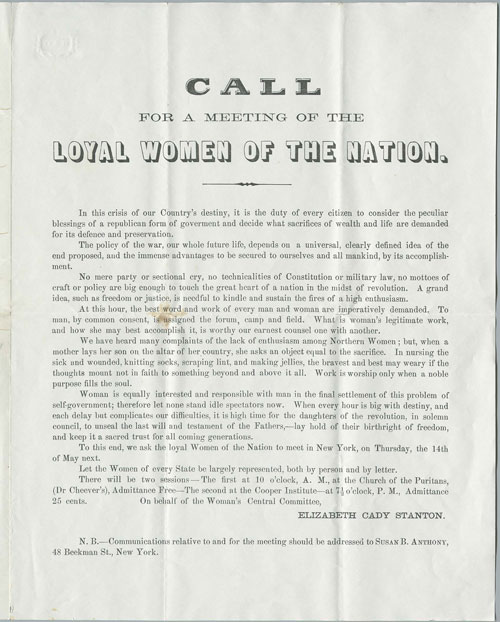
The call to the League's founding convention

Elizabeth Cady Stanton and Susan B. Anthony organized the League's founding convention. Both Stanton and Anthony are better known as campaigners for women's rights, but the leaders of the women's movement had agreed to suspend activity of that type during the Civil War and to focus instead on the fight against slavery. Abolitionist work was already familiar to Anthony, who had previously worked as a paid representative of the American Anti-Slavery Society, and to Stanton, whose husband had worked for the same organization.

The League's name signaled its alignment with the effort to encourage loyalty to the Union during the Civil War by creating organizations called Union Leagues or Loyal Leagues. The Emancipation Proclamation, which freed slaves in states that were in rebellion but not elsewhere, in some cases led abolitionists and their opponents to become involved in this movement in different ways. Conservatives in New York State, accommodating those who believed the Emancipation Proclamation was unconstitutional, formed an organization called the Loyal League of Union Citizens with the carefully worded purpose of supporting "the government in all its constitutional efforts to suppress the rebellion." A group of abolitionists that included Henry B. Stanton, husband of Elizabeth Cady Stanton, formed a rival organization called the Loyal National League, which supported the emancipation of slaves in all states. Encouraged by their male abolitionist colleagues and relatives, Elizabeth Cady Stanton and Susan B. Anthony created an organization that resembled the Loyal National League in both name and purpose but with a feminist perspective.

Stanton and Anthony laid the groundwork for the new organization by publishing an "Appeal to the Women of the Republic" in the New York Tribune, an influential newspaper that opposed slavery, and circulating a tract that contained the appeal and the call to the convention. Anthony opened the convention and nominated Lucy Stone, a prominent women's rights activist, as president of the meeting. Stanton gave the opening address. Other officers of the convention included well-known figures in the women's movement like Martha Coffin Wright, Amy Post, Antoinette Brown Blackwell, Ernestine Rose, and Angelina Grimké Weld.

Anthony introduced several resolutions with a short speech that began, "There is great fear expressed on all sides lest this shall be made a war for the negro. I am willing that it shall be. It is a war which was begun to found an empire upon slavery, and shame on us if we do not make it one to establish the freedom of the negro... Instead of suppressing the real cause of the war, it should have been proclaimed not only by the people but by the President, Congress, Cabinet and every military commander."

One of the resolutions she introduced read, "There can never be true peace in this republic until the civil and political rights of all citizens of African descent and all Women are practically established" Some attendees opposed the resolution because it introduced the issue of women's rights, which they thought was divisive and not relevant to the goals of the organization. It was adopted by a large majority, however.

Stanton was elected as president of the League and Anthony as its secretary. Its office was located in the newly established Cooper Union in New York City.

Using contacts developed by Stanton and Anthony through their previous work in the abolitionist and women's movements, the League launched a massive petition drive that gathered nearly 400,000 signatures calling for the U.S. Congress to pass an amendment that would abolish slavery. The largest petition campaign in the nation's history up to that time, it gathered signatures from approximately one out every twenty-four adults in the Northern states. Anthony was the chief organizer of this effort, which involved 2000 petition collectors.

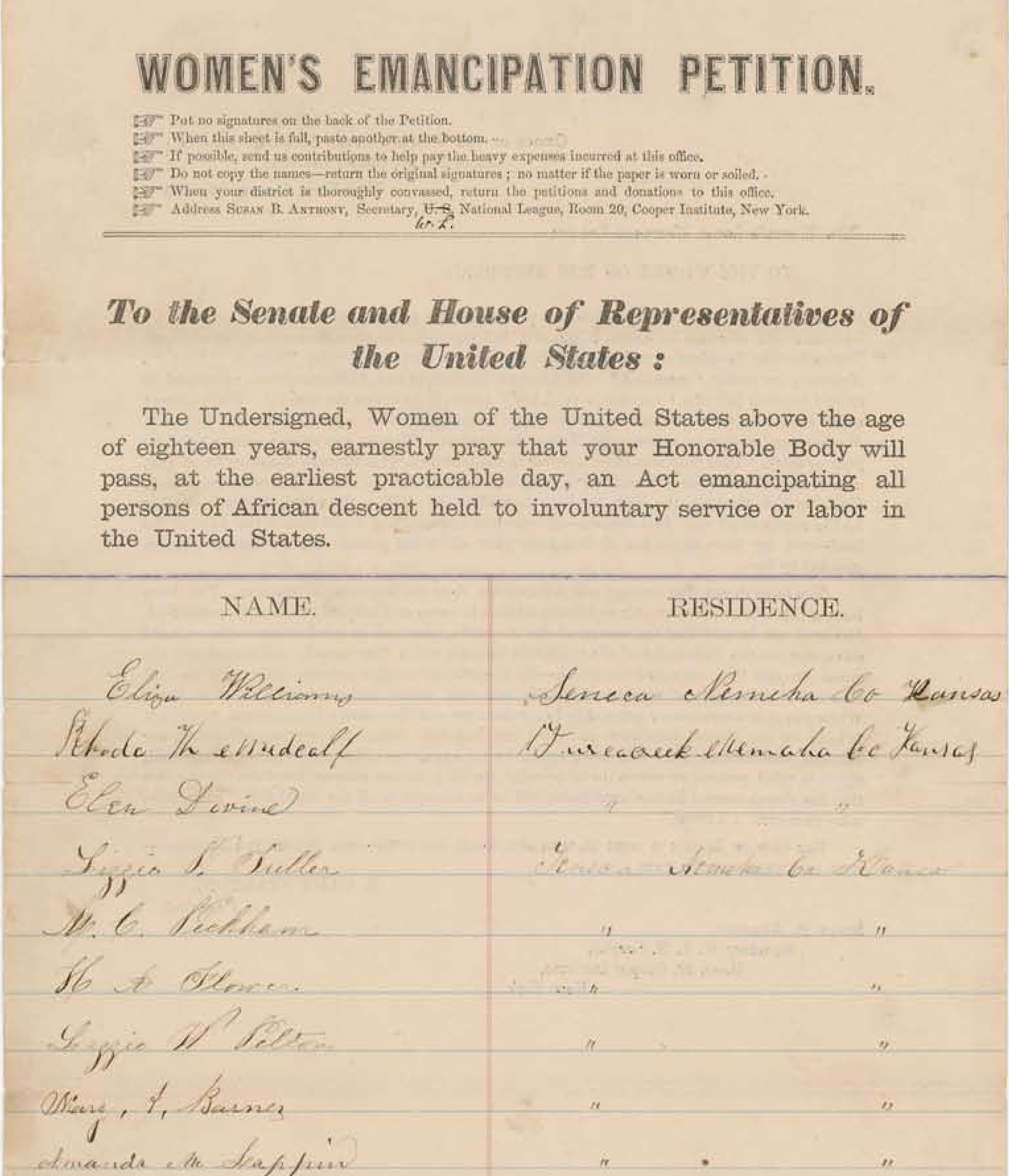
One of the petitions collected by the League

U.S. Senator Charles Sumner, the League's close ally in Congress, presented the names of the first 100,000 petitioners to Congress in dramatic fashion by arranging for two black men to carry the petitions, which had been glued end-to-end to form a large roll, onto the Senate floor. Afterwards he made a show of frequently delivering large batches of additional petitions as they arrived.

The petition drive was funded partly from donations from the petition signers themselves and partly from other donors. The League also raised money by selling pins containing the words "In Emancipation is National Unity" and the image of a slave breaking his chains. The Hovey Fund, created by a bequest from a supporter of abolition and women's rights, paid Anthony's salary of $12 per week. Anthony, who had no other source of income, stretched her salary by boarding with the Stanton's, who had a more comfortable financial situation. The League also employed an office clerk and two field agents, Hannah Tracy Cutler and Josephine S. Griffing, both of whom were abolitionist and women's rights activists.

The League held its second national convention in New York City on May 12, 1864. One resolution adopted at this meeting called for black men to have voting rights and also the right to be employed as soldiers, sailors and laborers with pay equal to that of whites. Another called for women in the field of medicine be paid the same as men who were doing the same work.

Slavery in the U.S. was abolished in 1865 by the Thirteenth Amendment. In August 1864, after it became clear that the amendment would be approved, the League judged its work to be over and closed its office.

== Name variations ==
The Appendix of Volume II of the History of Woman Suffrage, whose editors include Stanton and Anthony, reprints a lengthy newspaper article about the League's founding convention, including the adoption of this resolution: "Resolved, That the following be the official title and the pledge of the League—the pledge to be signed by all applicants for membership: 'Women's Loyal National League, organized in the city of New York, May 14, 1863.'" The Appendix also reprints letters from the League's office using that name in its letterhead. The main section of Volume II, however, presents the history of the League under a variation of that name: "The Woman's National Loyal League". Other variations appear in the same volume, and scholars in the earlier days of professionally written women's history referred to it by a confusing variety of names also. The exhaustively researched The Selected Papers of Elizabeth Cady Stanton and Susan B. Anthony, however, published by Ann D. Gordon in six volumes from 1997 to 2012, calls it by the official name used on the League's letterhead, "Women's Loyal National League".

== Significance ==
The League was the first national women's political organization in the United States. It demonstrated the value of formal organization to a women's movement that had previously been only loosely structured. (Before the Civil War the women's rights movement had only a few state associations and no national organization other than an informal coordinating committee that organized annual national conventions.) Its petition drive marked a continuation of the shift of women's activism from what was then called "moral suasion" to political action. It significantly assisted the passage of the Thirteenth Amendment, which abolished slavery in the U.S.

The League contributed to the development of a new generation of women abolitionist leaders, providing experience and recognition for Stanton and Anthony, and newcomers like Anna Dickinson, a teenaged orator. Its 5,000 members, 2,000 of whom actively circulated petitions, constituted a widespread network of women activists who gained experience that helped create a pool of talent for future forms of social activism.

The League provided the women's movement with a vehicle for combining the fight against slavery with the fight for women's rights by reminding the public that petitioning was the only political tool available to women at a time when only men were allowed to vote.
