= Laura Curtis Bullard =

American writer and suffragist

Laura Curtis Bullard (1831–1912) was an American writer and women's rights activist. She founded a newspaper called The Ladies' Visitor, and Drawing Room Companion and published two novels with women's rights themes, the best known of which is Christine: or, Woman's Trials and Triumphs. She was elected as a corresponding secretary for the National Woman Suffrage Association, led by Elizabeth Cady Stanton and Susan B. Anthony, at its founding meeting. She succeeded Stanton as editor of The Revolution, a women's rights newspaper founded by Stanton and Anthony.

== Early years ==
Laura Jane Curtis was born in Freedom, Maine, on Nov. 21, 1831, the oldest of five children of Lucy Winslow Curtis and Jeremiah Curtis. Her father was an abolitionist who became wealthy by establishing a company in Bangor, Maine, where the family moved, that produced Mrs Winslow's Soothing Syrup, a morphine-based tonic. In 1859 Laura married Enoch Bullard, an executive in her family's business who later became its president.

== Career ==
Bullard published two novels about women who determined the course of their own lives without depending on men. In 1854, when she was 23 years old, Bullard anonymously published Now-a-days!, in which the novel's heroine, who comes from a wealthy family, rejects a marriage proposal and moves to a remote part of Maine to earn her living as a teacher. In 1856 Bullard published under her own name Christine: or, Woman's Trials and Triumphs, in which the heroine rejects a disreputable suitor, becomes a woman's rights lecturer, opens a home for impoverished working women and adopts a daughter. Bullard also founded and edited a newspaper in New York City called The Ladies' Visitor, and Drawing Room Companion, which she published monthly from 1855 until she became pregnant in 1861.

Bullard was one of the earliest members of Sorosis, a women's professional and literary society that was founded in 1868. She became a corresponding secretary for the National Woman Suffrage Association, led by Elizabeth Cady Stanton and Susan B. Anthony, at its founding meeting in 1869. She wrote articles for The Revolution, the weekly women's rights newspaper founded by Stanton and Anthony in 1868. In 1870 she co-founded the Brooklyn Women's Club along with her friend Elizabeth Tilton, poetry editor of The Revolution and wife of Theodore Tilton, editor of the liberal New York Independent.

In May 1870 Bullard succeeded Stanton as editor of The Revolution. Under her leadership the paper developed a less confrontational style and was more oriented toward literature, but it continued to focus on women's issues. When Bullard assumed editorship of the paper, it was losing money at an unsustainable rate. She tried to increase revenue by including more advertisements. Stanton and Anthony had refused to accept advertisements for patent medicines, but Bullard printed ads of that type, many of which dealt with products sold by her family's business.

In December 1870, Bullard left for Europe with her son and elderly parents but continued to edit the newspaper from abroad. After editing The Revolution for 18 months, Bullard resigned her position in October 1871, citing the difficulty of editing the paper from Europe. The newspaper published its last issue less than four months later.

In January 1871, three New York newspapers printed rumors of an affair between Bullard and Theodore Tilton, who supposedly had sailed to Europe to join her. Both parties denied the rumors, which were never substantiated. Bullard remained a friend of Elizabeth Tilton after the rumors had been published.

When Emily Faithfull visited America from England in 1872, Mrs. Bullard provided her with a "headquarters" for her first American tour. Twelve years later, Faithful wrote of her:

Always dressed in exquisite taste, with a remarkably handsome face, expressive eyes, and that nameless charm which belongs to the refined and cultivated lady. Mrs. Bullard impressed you as much with a sense of her brilliant social qualities as her intellectual gifts. The correspondent of several foreign magazines, busy in philanthropic enterprises, and one of the most brilliant conversationalists I ever met, she naturally attracted around her not only those interested in social and educational reforms, but the best elements in literary and artistic circles. Her "evenings at home" reminded me of the pleasantest gatherings I ever attended at certain noted houses in London and Paris, where politicians and foreign diplomatists, men of science, poets, and wits, were skilfully commingled.

— Emily Faithfull, Three Visits to America (1884)

After Bullard left The Revolution she continued to maintain her friendship with Stanton, who was a frequent houseguest, and she continued to support the campaign for women's rights. She devoted much of the latter part of her life to the encouragement of writers and social reformers in both the U.S. and Europe. She corresponded with Walt Whitman and welcomed Oscar Wilde to her home when he visited the U.S. She published several essays and translated three German novels, but her work as a writer had mostly ended. Bullard died on January 19, 1912.
