= Elizabeth Richards Tilton =

American suffragist and editor (1834–1897)

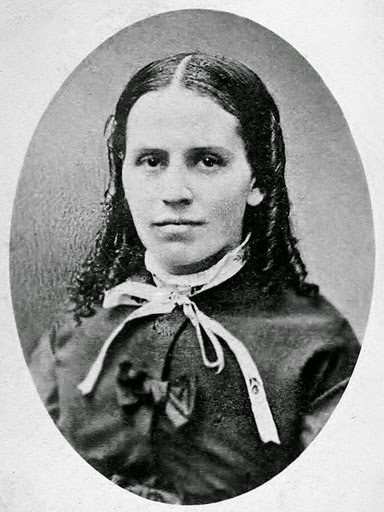
- Elizabeth Tilton, ca.1870
- Born: Elizabeth Monroe Richards; May 28, 1834; Brooklyn, New York, US
- Died: April 13, 1897 (aged 62); Brooklyn, New York, US
- Occupation: Suffragist
- Spouse: Theodore Tilton (m. 1855)
- Children: 7

Elizabeth Monroe Richards Tilton (May 28, 1834 – April 13, 1897) was an American suffragist, a founder of the Brooklyn Woman's Club, and a poetry editor of The Revolution, the newspaper of the National Woman Suffrage Association, founded by woman's rights advocates Elizabeth Cady Stanton and Susan B. Anthony. Elizabeth Tilton also served on the executive committee of the American Equal Rights Association.

Tilton became the largely silenced center of "the most sensational and highly publicized social scandal of the era" in 1875, when her husband Theodore Tilton brought a lawsuit charging "criminal conversation" against his friend, the popular preacher Henry Ward Beecher. Although the long trial ended in a deadlock, it destroyed the social positions and careers of both Elizabeth and Theodore Tilton. Beecher's reputation was tarnished, but he retained his position and much of his influence.

== Early life and education ==
Elizabeth Monroe Richards was born on May 28, 1834, in Brooklyn, New York, to Johanna Handley and Joseph Richards, a jeweller. Johanna married Nathan Brewster Morse, Sr. After having been a widow for a number of years, Johanna died on July 26, 1889, at her home in Brooklyn after a nine-month illness.

Elizabeth Richards attended the Brooklyn Female Seminary. She tutored her younger brother Joseph H. Richards and his friend Theodore Tilton, who attended Public School No. 1. When Tilton's parents decided to move to New Jersey, Tilton boarded with Elizabeth, Joseph, and their mother. They attended Plymouth Church, where Henry Ward Beecher was an extremely popular preacher. Elizabeth became a Sunday school teacher at Plymouth Church.

== Suffrage and women's rights ==
She was a participant in the women's rights movement. She was a contributor to and the poetry editor of The Revolution, which was the voice of the National Woman Suffrage Association, founded by Elizabeth Cady Stanton and Susan B. Anthony. With them, Elizabeth Tilton was one of a dozen signatories of a petition appealing for protection for voting rights in 1866.

In 1868 and 1869, she served on the executive committee of the American Equal Rights Association. In 1870, she was the corresponding secretary of the Brooklyn Equal Rights Association, and one of three members of a committee to find and set up a house in Brooklyn to serve as its headquarters. She founded the Brooklyn Woman's Club in 1870 with Celia M. Burleigh, Laura Curtis Bullard, and others.

== Marriage and children ==
Elizabeth Richards married Theodore Tilton (1835–1907) on October 2, 1855, in Plymouth Church. He was 20, and she was 21. The ceremony was performed by Henry Ward Beecher. Tilton worked on The Independent, a pro-Abolition magazine. (Note: Both The Independent and Plymouth Church were founded by Henry Chandler Bowen.) Theodore Tilton began to write for The Independent in 1856, while Beecher became the editor-in-chief in 1861. Tilton was his assistant, and replaced him as editor in 1864. Theodore Tilton was active and respected as a writer, speaker, and lecturer.

Of the seven children born to the Tiltons over 14 years, four of the children survived past infancy. Her daughter Florence was born around 1858. Alice was born in 1859. A child named Mattie died in infancy. Her son Carroll was born in 1864. An infant son, Paul, died in August 1868. Her last surviving child, Ralph, was born June 21, 1869. For the first five years of their marriage, and again from 1860 to 1863, the Tiltons lived in a boardinghouse run by Elizabeth's mother, on Harrison Avenue in the Sixth Ward. By 1866, the upwardly mobile Theodore Tilton aspired to a brownstone in the more fashionable area of Brooklyn Heights.

He increasingly disparaged his wife's family, and sought to separate her from them. Although he was reported to have said that "Elizabeth was undervalued in her intellectual character ... she was the finest critic he had ever had", Theodore Tilton also felt embarrassed in his new social circle by Elizabeth's dress, deportment, speech and demeanor. Elizabeth described occasions when her husband indicated that she was "so insignificant that he was ashamed of [her]", and another when he held a gathering of "woman's rights people" at their home, and "particularly requested me not to come near him that night". Theodore Tilton also traveled frequently on lecture tours in 1866–1868, which gave him opportunities to be sexually unfaithful, something he confessed to Elizabeth on January 25, 1868.

== Scandal ==
=== Friendship with Henry Ward Beecher ===
Theodore Tilton and Henry Ward Beecher became close friends, a relationship that has been described as both passionate and physical. Tilton and Beecher worked on The Independent, a pro-Abolition magazine. Both men were advocates of abolition and temperance. The more radical Tilton spoke in favor of women's rights to vote and to divorce. Beecher, who was unhappily married to Eunice White Beecher, emphasized the role of women in the home.

During 1866–1868 Beecher was struggling to write Norwood (1868), a book one reviewer described as "apparently interminable, and so amazingly dull". On January 3, 1866, Beecher described the main characters to his publisher as "the man of philosophy and theology and the woman of nature and simple truth". It has been suggested that Elizabeth Tilton encouraged Beecher in his writing, and that she can be associated with his "woman of nature". It has also been suggested that she turned to him for comfort after baby Paul's death in August 1868. To what extent Elizabeth was or saw herself as Beecher's "muse" is unclear. She identified October 10, 1868, as "A Day Memorable" in her private diary, but did not indicate why.

=== Confession ===
On July 3 or 4, 1870, Elizabeth apparently confessed to her husband that October 10, 1868, had marked the start of a deeper relationship between herself and Beecher, which Beecher had encouraged her to keep secret. It may have been an emotional relationship or a sexual relationship. (Note: The nature and extent of the relationship between them may have been anything from an idealized or sentimentalized emotional bond, to a full-fledged sexual relationship. Recent writers have raised questions of whether Beecher displayed a pattern of predatory behavior towards his parishioners, and whether Elizabeth Tilton's familial relationships suggest patterns of abuse.) Whatever Elizabeth's actual involvement, her husband suspected her of adultery and her last surviving child of being illegitimate.

The situation was complicated because both Henry Beecher and Theodore Tilton were believed to have affairs with other women. Beecher was rumored to have had relationships with several women in his Plymouth Church congregation including Lucy Maria (Tappan) Bowen (1825–1863), the first wife of Henry Chandler Bowen. She had confessed the affair to her husband on her deathbed. Theodore Tilton was rumored not only to have been sexually unfaithful while on tour, but also to be involved in an affair with Elizabeth's friend Laura Curtis Bullard.

The Tiltons' letters to each other over a period of several years reveal a shift from hopefulness on Elizabeth's part to awareness of the harmfulness of the "ungenerosity and fault-finding" of their actual time together. (Note: The Tiltons' letters to each other over a period of several years reveal a complex and changing relationship, as they examine both their personal relations and the very nature of marriage itself. At first Elizabeth appears to have hoped for a mutual and equal reconciliation with Theodore, in which both she and her husband would acknowledge that they had failed to fully commit to their marriage, and would renew their religious commitment to each other. Later, they describe and debate the possibility of a highly idealized marriage, in which "saint" Elizabeth must "make the path smooth" for Theodore. Elizabeth at least was painfully aware of the contrast between the perfected imaginary marriage of their letters and the "ungenerosity and fault-finding" of their actual time together.)

Following Elizabeth's confession to Theodore, both of the Tiltons confided in others. These included Elizabeth Cady Stanton, Susan B. Anthony, Henry Chandler Bowen, and Francis D. Moulton and his wife Emma. (Note: Responses to the Tiltons reflected complex and changing networks of professional, political and religious allegiances as well as personal relationships. These were reflected in the ownership and editing of newspapers; the founding, pastorate and membership of Brooklyn's churches; and political affiliations, particularly those within the Republican party and among local women's rights and abolitionist reformers.) Elizabeth Cady Stanton and Susan B. Anthony apparently first heard about the scandal in the fall of 1870. Conflicting stories describe a contentious evening, in which Theodore Tilton dined at Laura Bullard's house with Stanton, leaving Elizabeth Tilton and Anthony behind at the Tilton house. Theodore Tilton told Stanton his side of the Tilton–Beecher affair over dinner; Anthony heard of it from Elizabeth Tilton that same night. Rival accounts of the evening were given by Elizabeth Tilton and Stanton in 1874, four years after the events. They agreed that after Theodore Tilton returned to his house, there was an altercation between him and one of the women (each named the other), that Theodore Tilton had become violently angry, and that Susan B. Anthony had sheltered Elizabeth Tilton in her room overnight, locking the door. Stanton clearly saw Anthony as saving a threatened wife from a violent husband; Elizabeth Tilton may not have appreciated Stanton's assumption of authority.

Possibly as a result of this evening, Elizabeth left Theodore in late September or early October 1870 and traveled to Marietta, Ohio, where she stayed with a friend, Sarah Putnam. (Note: Elizabeth's mother, Mrs. N. B. Morse, was aware of the conflict and acted briefly as Theodore Tilton's housekeeper in Elizabeth's absence, until she too quarreled with him.) When Elizabeth Tilton returned to Brooklyn on December 10, 1870, there was a violent altercation with Theodore, and Elizabeth took their four children and went to her mother's home, where she remained for some time before again returning to her husband, when she was pregnant again by him. The pregnancy ended in a miscarriage on December 24, 1870, which Elizabeth attributed to "anxiety night and day".

The miscarriage seems to have triggered a rapid cascade of events. The same day, Mrs. Morse wrote to Henry Bowen, Tilton's employer, with complaints against Tilton. Bowen consulted Henry Beecher before confronting Tilton, who responded with accusations against Beecher. Bowen (whose wife had also confessed to an affair with Beecher, some years previously) encouraged Tilton to write to Beecher and demand his resignation from the church. On December 26, 1870, Tilton wrote to Beecher, "Sir, I demand that, for reasons which you explicitly understand, you immediately cease from the ministry of Plymouth Church, and that you quit the City of Brooklyn as a residence." Bowen delivered the vaguely-worded letter to Beecher.

Theodore Tilton turned to Frank Moulton, a childhood friend of Tilton and Beecher, who became a mediator between the men. He primarily focused on hiding the scandal as their friendship disintegrated. There were a series of letters that Elizabeth signed beginning on December 29, 1870. In the first she described her confession, then Beecher had her sign a letter of retraction, followed by a retraction of the retraction at Theodore's request. On December 31, Elizabeth Tilton sent Moulton to Beecher to retrieve the letters. (Note: Tilton also told Elizabeth of his letter to Beecher. She revealed that she had not spoken to Beecher of her confession, and implored Theodore to contact Beecher directly and avert scandal. Theodore had her sign a letter describing her confession, dated December 29, 1870. He and Moulton confronted Beecher with the letter on Friday, December 30. Thunderstruck, Beecher asked to see Elizabeth (still in bed due to the miscarriage) and dictated a letter of retraction to her, which she also signed. Upon learning of the retraction, Theodore Tilton composed a retraction of the retraction, which Elizabeth also signed.)

On December 31, 1870, Bowen fired Tilton from The Independent, unwilling to support his radical politics and wishing to distance himself from a possible scandal. In an attempt to pacify Tilton, Beecher and Moulton created a new newspaper, The Golden Age, hiring Tilton as its editor. Possibly as part of the ongoing attempt to cover up the scandal, Tilton became involved with woman's suffrage and free love advocate Victoria Woodhull. (Note: Victoria Woodhull and her sister Tennessee Claflin may have heard of the scandal through Elizabeth Cady Stanton but they also gathered many of the details from Theodore himself.) By spring 1871, Theodore and Victoria were intimate, and in September 1871 he published an effusive biography of her.

As her marriage unraveled, Elizabeth Tilton became less hopeful. Her sentimental reading of Charles Reade's sensationalist novel Griffith Gaunt (1866) sparked a realization of the potential dangers of spiritual advisors, and a reevaluation of her involvement with Beecher. On June 29, 1871, Elizabeth wrote a letter to Theodore that assumed great importance in later court proceedings, as lawyers tried to interpret her meaning.

My dear Theodore, To-day, through the ministry of Catherine Gaunt, a character of fiction, my eyes have been opened, for the first time in my experience, so that I see clearly my sin. It was when I knew that I was loved, to suffer it to grow to a passion. A virtuous woman should check instantly an absorbing love. But it appeared to me in such false light. That the love I felt and received could harm no one, not even you, I have believed unfalteringly until 4 o'clock this afternoon, when the heavenly vision dawned on me. I see now, as never before, the wrong I have done you, and hasten immediately to ask your pardon, with a penitence so sincere that henceforth (if reason remains) you may trust me implicitly. Oh! my dear Theo, though your opinions are not restful or congenial to my soul, yet my own integrity and purity are a sacred and holy thing to me. Bless God, with me, for Catherine Gaunt, and for all the sure leadings of an all-wise and loving Providence. Yes, now I feel quite prepared to renew my marriage vow with you, to keep it as the Savior requireth, who looketh at the eye and the heart. Never before could I say this, I know not that you are yet able, or ever will be, to say this to me. Still, with what profound thankfulness that I am come to this sure foundation, and that my feet are planted on the rock of this great truth you cannot at all realize. When you yearn toward me with any true feeling, be assured of the tried, purified and restored love of Elizabeth.

The "Catherine Gaunt" letter clearly shows that Elizabeth had reinterpreted her actions from a spiritual perspective as sinful. What had actually occurred between her and Beecher, and whether their relationship had been emotional, physical, or both, remained utterly opaque. (Note: Elizabeth Tilton made several statements about her relationship with Beecher, often under extremely stressful conditions. Her statements were inconsistent: she alternately admitted and retracted confessions of infidelity in response to pressure from both her husband and from Beecher.)

All three people—Elizabeth, Theodore and Beecher—sentimentalized and reinterpreted their thoughts and actions as events progressed. One historian reflects on the relationships between Beecher and the Tiltons, "They are real people. Living people ... They aren't characters in a novel. They are complicated and contradictory, and I don't have a clue as to whom to believe."

=== Public knowledge ===
The Beecher–Tilton scandal became open public knowledge in November 1872 when Victoria Woodhull published a special edition of The Woodhull and Claflin Weekly. In it, Woodhull sensationalized the relationship of Henry Ward Beecher and Elizabeth Tilton, claiming Theodore Tilton as her source of information. Woodhull and Claflin attacked Beecher, not for having relationships outside marriage, but for hypocritically refusing to endorse them.

On November 2, 1872, mere days before the presidential election of November 5, 1872, in which Woodhull was a candidate, she was arrested. The sisters were charged by district attorney Benjamin Tracy with sending obscene materials – her Beecher–Tilton pamphlet – through the U. S. Mail. They were held in Ludlow Street Jail, a federal prison in New York City, for the next six months. The indictments against them were finally dismissed.

Copies of the Weekly exposé sold for as much as $40. But in spite of Woodhull's denunciations of Beecher and Tilton, the initial response of most newspapers was to largely ignore the story. Such topics were seen as inappropriate, a violation of the boundaries of respectability and politeness, or not a "public" matter.

=== Clerical investigation ===
Tensions increased as both Theodore Tilton and Beecher were pressured by their friends to respond to Woodhull's accusations. Tilton, Beecher and Bowen had signed a "Tri-partite Covenant" on April 2, 1872, agreeing to keep silent. Tilton, however, continued to leak information against Beecher. On October 31, 1873, in spite of Beecher's opposition to the move, Plymouth Church dropped Theodore Tilton from its membership for "slandering" their pastor, Beecher.

Tilton had spoken, among others, with Richard Salter Storrs, a gifted scholar and pastor of the Church of the Pilgrims in Brooklyn, New York. Bowen and others had left Storrs' church when they formed Plymouth Church and chose Beecher as its pastor, preferring his charisma and showmanship. Now Storrs convinced the Council of Congregational Churches to investigate the disfellowshipping of Tilton from Plymouth Church, in particular whether Plymouth Church could do so without investigating the allegations against Beecher. The Council potentially had authority over not only Beecher, but the very existence of Plymouth Church. The Council met from March 9–29, 1874, and concluded by censuring Plymouth Church's actions.

On June 21, 1874, Theodore Tilton published a letter in The Golden Age, publicly accusing Beecher of adultery with Elizabeth Tilton. As of June 27, 1874, Plymouth Church established its own investigating committee to inquire into the scandal. The committee was filled with prominent friends and supporters of Beecher. With this official recognition, the story exploded into the newspapers. The press' new focus on interviews as they followed the Tilton case has been identified as a turning point in the relationship between the press and private individuals in the United States. Satirical magazines such as Puck made Beecher, in particular, an iconic figure, targeting both his morals and his politics.

On July 11, 1874, Elizabeth Tilton left her husband permanently. Theodore did not try to prevent her from leaving, later testifying that "she was a free, sovereign actor in the business" and that he "never applied any coercion to her in any way". During the investigation, and the subsequent civil trial, Elizabeth Tilton was "housed and supported" by members of the congregation of Plymouth Church.

One day later, on July 12, 1874, Elizabeth Tilton testified in front of the investigating committee of Plymouth Church. Then, and again in a letter dated July 23, 1874, in the Brooklyn Eagle, Elizabeth Tilton refuted her husband's assertions of a sexual relationship between herself and Beecher, declaring "I affirm myself before God to be innocent of the crimes laid upon me; that never have I been guilty of adultery with Henry Ward Beecher in thought or deed; nor has he ever offered to me an indecorous or improper proposal." Her husband, she asserted, was attempting to prove that she was "insane, weak-minded, insignificant, of mean presence." As of August 27, Plymouth Church released its official report, exonerating Beecher.

On August 13, 1874, Theodore Tilton published 201 letters, selecting and editing 112 written by himself and 89 written by Elizabeth between 1864 and 1870. The letters appeared in the Chicago Tribune. Elizabeth considered Theodore's publication of her private correspondence to be "perfidious and sacrilegious", a violation of the privacy of their marriage.

=== Civil lawsuit ===
On August 20, 1874, Theodore Tilton brought a civil suit for "criminal conversation" against his former friend, Henry Ward Beecher. He requested $100,000 in compensation for what was legally regarded as a matter of theft. Under the legal framework of "criminal conversation", a woman was regarded as the property of her husband. The party against whom the suit was brought was seen as having stolen or damaged the property of the husband. The wife became an "absent presence", who could not testify in court.

She [Elizabeth Tilton] was the silent party throughout much of the trial, muted by a legal fiction that defined a civil trial for adultery as a property dispute between one man and another. Nearly four months into the trial, she rose and tried to read a statement to the court and was summarily denied by the judge. – May 3, 1875.

The trial began on January 4, 1875, and continued until July 2, 1875. It has been referred to as "America's first major clergy sexual abuse scandal", and it received national attention from the press.

Potential spectators competed to claim the limited number of seats that were available each day. Although attempts were made initially to keep women out entirely, a few seats were made available for them. The women involved in the case, and others attending in the courtroom, were criticized in the press for their presence. Simply being in the courtroom was considered immodest and improper. Both Elizabeth Tilton and her mother, Mrs. Morse, attended the trial as spectators. So did a limited number of other women, many from Plymouth Church. Elizabeth was described frequently by the press as meek, shy, yielding and compliant, and as showing calmness, resignation and sadness, sometimes sobbing.

The trial also became an "intensely literary event", in which the intentions and actions of Elizabeth Tilton (who could not testify) and others were inferred from novels, letters and quotations. Elizabeth's reading of Griffith Gaunt (1866) by Charles Reade, a best-selling novel which dealt with love, marriage, and ministers, apparently caused her to reinterpret her own "excessive devotion to her priest" as sinful. Theodore Tilton's reading of the same novel may have strengthened his belief that Elizabeth was guilty of adultery.

Both Henry Beecher and Theodore Tilton described Elizabeth Tilton in conflicted terms symbolic of the meaning of "woman": She was described as both matronly and childlike; as pious and saintly, but also sensual and powerful. Beecher is quoted as saying "You see her one time and you would think her a saint on earth; at another time she is a weak, irresponsible being and anything but a saint." Her husband's letters make it clear that he had idealized her: "If you should ever appear to me anything less than the ideal woman, the Christian saint that I know you to be, I shall not care to live a day longer."

Theodore Tilton published his own novel, Tempest-Tossed in 1874. It is about a family adrift in the Atlantic for fifteen years. The characters of Mary and Rodney Vail demonstrate "the love that dwells in the soul rather than in the heart". Philip Chantilly's love for their daughter Barbara transcends physical separation; indeed, he falls in love with an "imaginary angel" precisely because he does not know her. Tilton told the Plymouth Investigating Committee in 1874 that the character of Mary Vail was based upon his wife, and intended as a tribute to "Elizabeth's blameless purity".

On July 2, 1875, the civil trial was completed. After 112 days of courtroom testimony (resulting in more than a million words of text), 16 full days of final arguments to the jury, 8 days of deliberation, and 52 ballots, accompanied by hundreds of newspaper articles and editorials, the trial ended in a deadlocked jury.

"It is a question of fact, a question of the veracity of witnesses on which we do not agree, your Honor, and I would say I think there is not a possibility of an agreement in this jury."

The opinions of those who knew the parties in the case were widely divergent, like those of the jurors. Beecher's own family was divided on the issue. His sisters Catharine Beecher, Mary Beecher Perkins, and Harriet Beecher Stowe supported him. His half-sister, Isabella Beecher Hooker and her husband John Hooker remained friends of Victoria Woodhull, and openly criticized the double standards applied to Isabella's half-brother Henry Ward Beecher and to Woodhull, Elizabeth Tilton, and Isabella herself. Isabella and her husband went to Europe, where they spent several years to avoid the worst of the family conflict around Beecher.

Susan B. Anthony kept her opinions about the Tiltons mostly private, and was unhappy that Elizabeth Cady Stanton chose to speak out about Anthony's experiences with them. Stanton's main concern was for the women's movement. She predicted: "When Beecher falls, as he must, he will pull all he can down with him. But we must not let the cause of woman go down in the smash. It is innocent."

Stanton knew all of the parties in the lawsuit and spoke openly about them. She described both of the Tiltons as "too solely sentimental", and said that "each had an exaggerated notion of what the other should be." In an interview in 1875, Stanton stated that "I have all along said that what Henry Ward Beecher would swear to, I would believe" – a statement that did not indicate strong conviction of his innocence, since Beecher had refused to swear on the Bible when he appeared on the witness stand on April 1, 1875, stating he had "conscientious scruples".

=== Consequences ===
Beecher returned to his pulpit at Plymouth Church, and over time, "largely redeemed" his reputation. In February 1876, Plymouth Church called a second Congregational Council, this time of friendly churches. They exonerated Beecher in March. In April, church members who had testified against Beecher, including Henry Bowen, Emma Moulton, Martha Bradshaw and George Bell, were expelled from Plymouth Church.

Victoria Woodhull married English banker John Biddulph Martin in 1882, and remained in England after his death in 1897, a wealthy widow.

The public scandal is credited with undermining the women's suffrage movement and delaying woman suffrage for a generation, due to Victoria Woodhull's association of women's suffrage with "free love" and immorality.

== Later years and death ==
Elizabeth Tilton and her children were left largely without financial support, although some members of Plymouth Church may have hired her as a tutor. She remained an official member of the Plymouth Church's congregation until April 16, 1878. At that time she again changed her testimony, stating that she had, in fact, been sexually involved with Beecher. As a result, she was excommunicated by the church. She later joined the Plymouth Brethren.

Towards the end of her life, Elizabeth Tilton lived with a widowed daughter, Florence Pelton, and Florence's daughter, the artist Agnes Pelton, on Pacific Street, Brooklyn. She became blind, but remained active, using a cane to navigate streets and trolley cars until surgery a year before her death restored her sight. She died on April 13, 1897, after two paralytic strokes about a month apart. Her two sons and two daughters were present at her death. Her private funeral service was conducted by a preacher from the Plymouth Brethren, Malachi Taylor. She was buried in Green-Wood Cemetery in Brooklyn, near where her deceased infant children were buried. Her gravestone was marked only "Grandmother".

Theodore Tilton moved to France. He died in Paris, May 29, 1907, and was buried in the Cimetiere de Chailly en Biere, Chailly-en-Bière, France.
