= Mariana Wright Chapman =

American social worker and activist

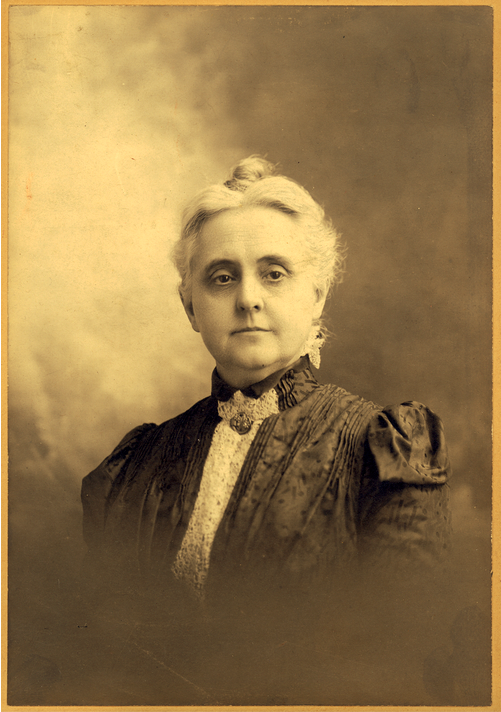
- Born: 1843; New York City
- Died: 1907 (aged 63–64); Port Washington, New York
- Education: Friends Seminary
- Occupations: reformer, women's rights activist
- Spouse: Noah H. Chapman
- Children: 5
- Parents: Aaron Wright; Mary Willets Wright

Mariana Wright Chapman (March 14, 1843 – November 9, 1907) was an American social reformer and women's rights activist. Her most active work was in the direction of prison reform and equal rights for women. Chapman was well-known through her work in the Hicksite Society of Friends, of which she was one of the organizers, and because of her advocacy of woman's suffrage. Chapman was president of the Woman Suffrage Association of Brooklyn, which office she resigned to become president of the New York State Woman Suffrage Association.

== Early life and education ==
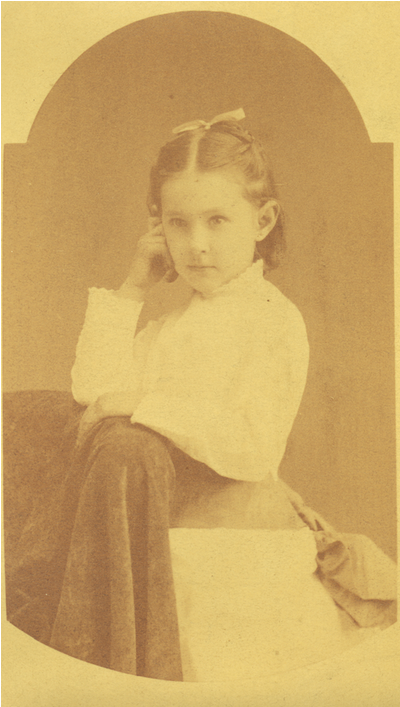
Mariana Wright Chapman as a young girl

Mariana Wright was born in New York on March 14, 1843. Her father was Dr. Aaron Wright, formerly of Ohio, and her mother was Mary Willets, daughter of Amos Willets of New York, both members of the Society of Friends.

Her early education was received at private schools in New York City, including the Friends' Institute, later called the Friends Seminary, on Hester Street, Lower East Side. After the removal of the family to Springboro, Ohio, in 1857, she attended Antioch College for two years.

== Career ==
She married Noah H. Chapman of Cincinnati, Ohio, in 1864, under the care of the Springboro Monthly Meeting, and they lived in the vicinity of Cincinnati until 1880, when they moved to Brooklyn (Kings County, New York). They had three sons, Charles, Wright, and Howard, and two daughters, Mary and Charlotte.

As her children grew older and the family responsibilities lessened, she became an active worker in the Hicksite Society of Friends, serving for several years as a trustee of its school and as a member of its philanthropic committee.

While all movements for the betterment of humanity received her support, her most active work was in the direction of prison reform and equal rights for women.

As their three sons and two daughters got older, Mariana became active in the struggle for woman suffrage. Her interest in woman suffrage began in 1884, during the convention of the Woman Suffrage Association in Brooklyn, of which Lucy Stone was president. These meetings made a profound impression upon her and shortly after, she decided to assist in this work. She joined the Brooklyn Woman Suffrage Association and later became its president. She then served as president of the New York State Woman's Suffrage Association from 1897 to 1902, when she resigned because of ill health.

When Governor Roosevelt recommended to the New York State Legislature that it should extend some measure of representation to women, Chapman was one of the women who were summoned to Albany, New York to confer with him. She also spoke before the Legislature on the subject several times, as among public speakers, she was unusually effective.

She was president of the Brooklyn Woman's Club for two years, and was a member until her death. She was also a member of the Woman's Auxiliary of the Civil Service Reform Commission, and was instrumental in establishing the Friends' Equal Rights Association.

Chapman was a charter member of the New York League for Political Education. She was one of the chief supporters for the bill which appointed matrons in police stations, there to serve the needs of women prisoners. She was also an active supporter in other lines of prison reform and of the peace movement.

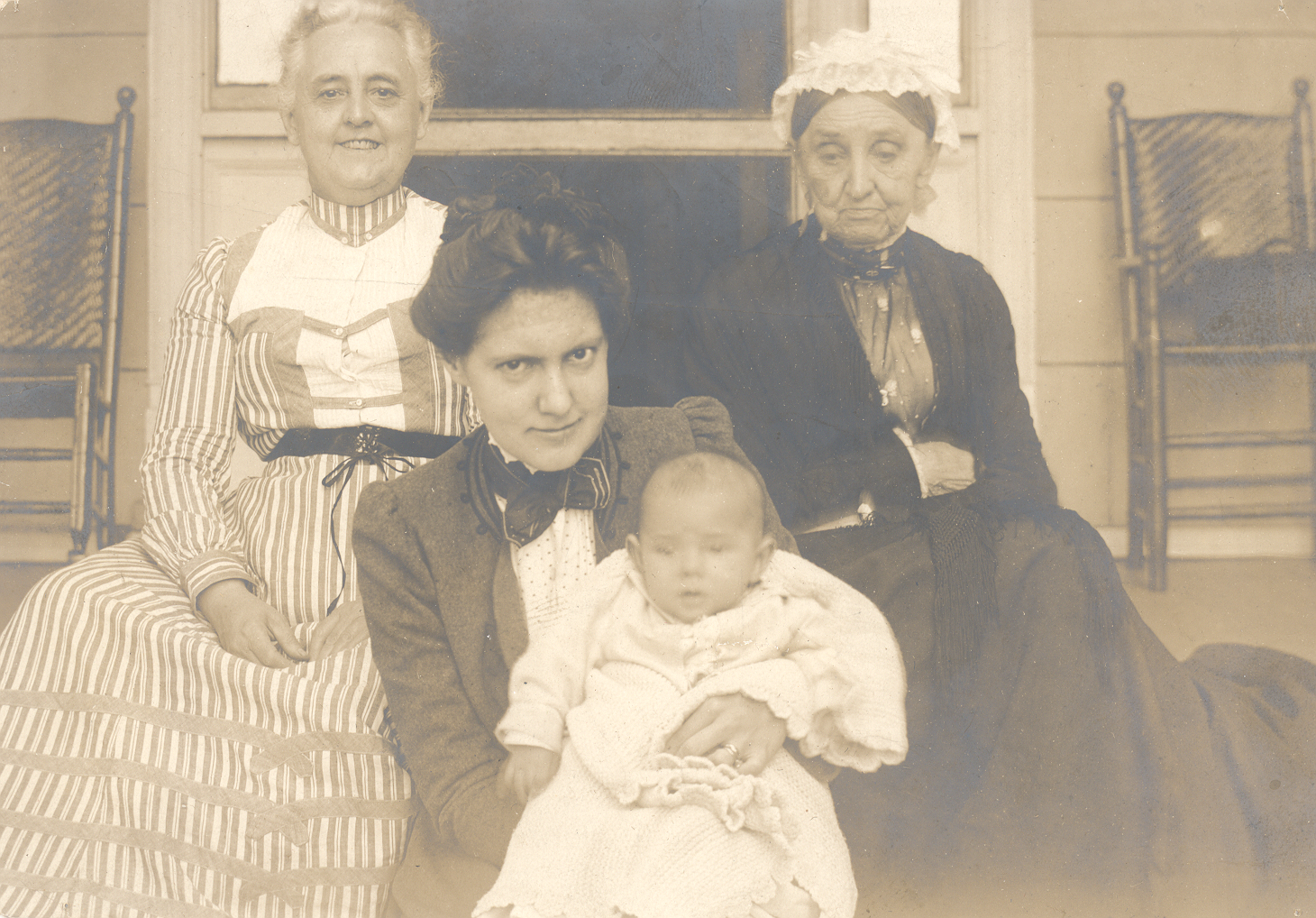
Mariana Wright Chapman and Family Members (Left to Right: Mariana Wright Chapman, her daughter Charlotte Chapman Turner, her infant grandson Henry Chandlee Turner, and her mother Mary Willets Wright)

== Death and legacy ==
She died, aged 64, after a long illness at her country home,"Westover", Port Washington Nassau County, New York (on Long Island), on November 9, 1907. Interment was at Westbury, New York (Long Island). The Mariana Wright Chapman Family Papers are held at Swarthmore College.
