= Brooklyn Woman's Club =

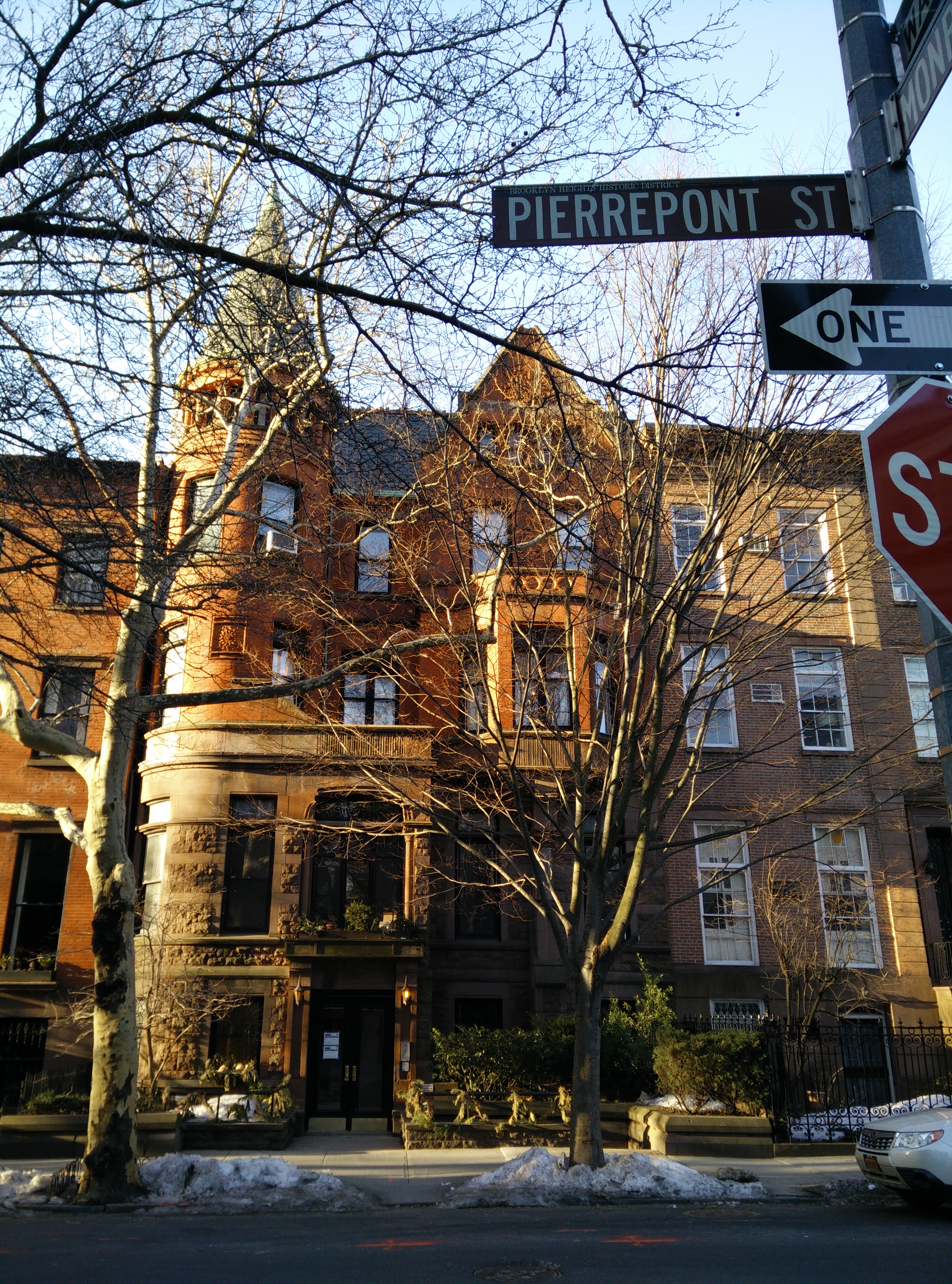
- Formation: 1869
- Headquarters: 114 Pierrepont St, Brooklyn, NY
- Region served: United States
- Members: 300
- President: Laura Curtis Bullard
- Website: https://brooklynwomansclub.org/about-us

The Brooklyn Woman's Club was an organization founded in 1869 and incorporated in 1871. Laura Curtis Bullard cofounded the organization along with her friend Elizabeth Tilton and others, and served as its first president. In 1912, the club moved to 114 Pierrepont Street in Brooklyn Heights and shared the building with the Brooklyn Women Suffrage Association and the Civitas Club.

In 1915, Ida Sherwood Coffin (née Willets) served as president. After his election in 1921, President Warren Harding wrote to Mrs. William Hoster, director of social services for the organization, to endorse their work for child welfare in Brooklyn.

In addition to working towards women's suffrage, the club also hosted events such as card games for hundreds of attendees and lectures on world politics and peace advocacy.

== Notable people ==
- Laura Curtis Bullard
- Mariana Wright Chapman
- Elizabeth Tilton
- Amelia K. Wing
