= Amelia K. Wing =

American author, philanthropist and clubwoman

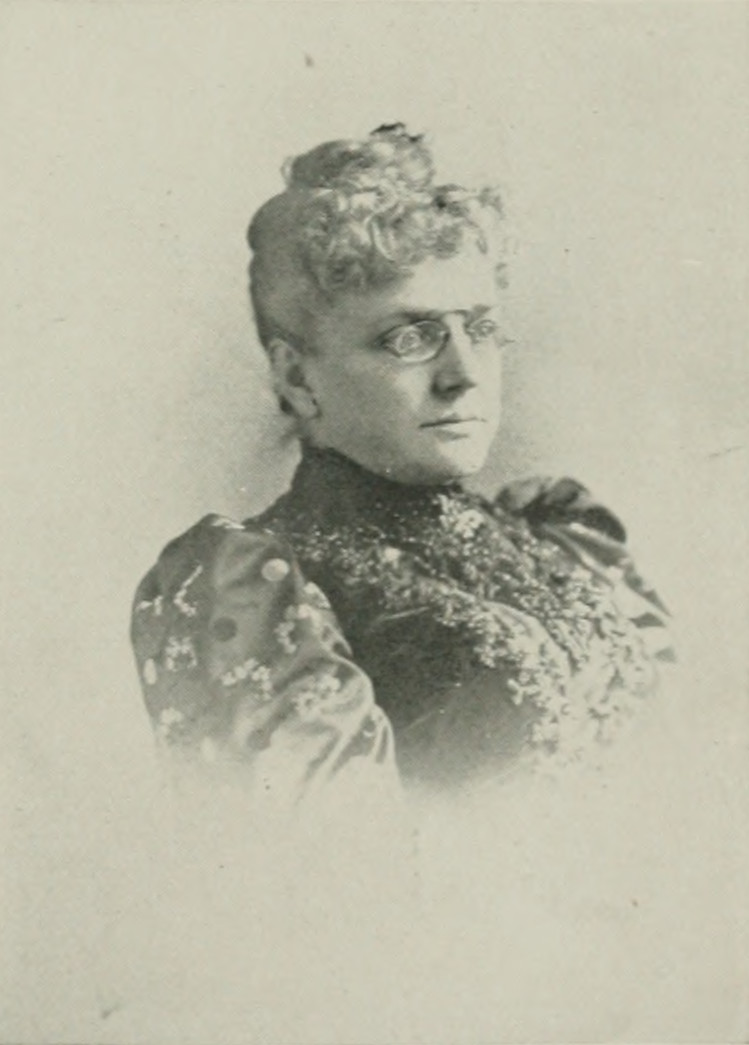
- "A Woman of the Century"
- Born: Amelia Kempshall (or Kempsall); May 31, 1837; Rochester, New York, U.S.
- Died: July 21, 1927 (aged 90); Brooklyn, New York, U.S.
- Resting place: Green-Wood Cemetery
- Education: Ingham University
- Occupations: author; philanthropist; clubwoman
- Spouse: Frederick Hopkins Wing (m. 1859; died 1911)
- Children: 3 sons
- Writing career
- Notable work: Poems About Our Borough

Amelia K. Wing (May 31, 1837 – July 21, 1927) was an American author, philanthropist, and clubwoman. Prominent in club-life, she was one of the earliest members of the Brooklyn Woman's Club where she served as president for five years, and at the time of her death, was honorary president. Her Poems About Our Borough contained a cover illustration of Brooklyn Heights and the Brooklyn Bridge.

== Early life and education ==
Amelia Kempshall or Kempsall (Note: Wing's maiden name is recorded as Kempshall by Willard & Livermore (1893) and Kempsall in her The Brooklyn Daily Eagle obituary.) was born in Rochester, New York, May 31, 1837. She was the oldest of a family of eight children. Her parents were Willis and Amelia Knapp Kemphsall. Her father, the son of an English gentleman and a representative man, gave his children the best educational advantages of the time. Wing was a student at the Middlebury Academy in Wyoming, New York, and at Ingham University.

== Career ==
Although reared with a prospect of continued affluence, her earnestness of purpose was early shown, for, at the age of sixteen, during financial trouble, she, eager to feel herself in touch with the world, went to teach in a public school in Brooklyn, New York.

She married Frederick Hopkins Wing (1830-1911) in Plymouth Church, October 6, 1859, the Rev. Henry Ward Beecher officiating. The couple removed to Newark, Ohio. When the needs of the Civil War aroused women into action, Wing's capabilities were quickly recognized, and she was made secretary and treasurer of a local branch of the Sanitary Commission. She did active service in that position.

After the war, she traveled extensively in Europe with her husband. On her return to Brooklyn, Wing continued her connection with philanthropic work, serving as chair of the executive committee of the Maternity Hospital and recording secretary for the Brooklyn Home for Consumptives.

Wing was prominent in club life in Brooklyn and was one of the earliest members of the Brooklyn Woman's Club. In January 1886, she was elected president of the Brooklyn Woman's Club and remained in office for five years by unanimous reelection; at the time of her death, she was honorary president.

On March 20, 1890, at Madison Square Theatre, the foundation for a permanent General Federation of Women's Clubs was organized. A committee, which included Wing, was appointed to draft a constitution and present a plan of organization. She belonged to the Ex-Presidents Club and the Pioneer Workers of the General Federation of Women's Clubs. She served as president of the Benevolent Society in Lafayette Avenue Presbyterian Church, for five years; chair of the board of directors of the Brooklyn Maternity Center, for four years; president of the Home Missionary Society, Plymouth Church, for seven years; and was the honorary president of the Women's Guild, Plymouth Church.

Wing was a writer of prose and poetry and published several works, her literary work beginning after her two sons were grown. She wrote on many subjects, including stories for children. A deep religious spirituality pervaded her hymns and poetry. The "Coming Woman" was a favorite topic.

Poems About Our Borough contained a cover illustration of Brooklyn Heights and the Brooklyn Bridge. The opening part was devoted to a number of local poems. The first poem was an elaborate and highly artistic work, entitled "Sunset From Brooklyn Heights. "To the Tugboats of New York Bay" was of a different character. "Down the Bay" was the title of a sentimental poem of thought engendered by looking down upon the waterfront from the Heights. The second part contained other poems.

== Personal life ==
Wing was the mother of three sons: Ralph (b. 1863), Frederick (b. 1866), and Rollin (b. 1866).

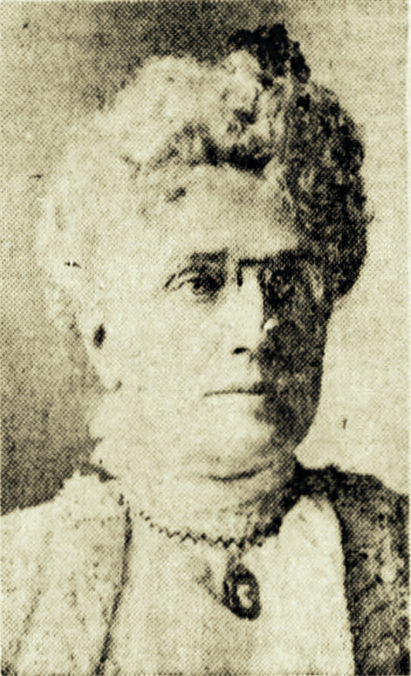
Obituary photo, 1927

Amelia Kempshall Wing died July 21, 1927, in Brooklyn at the Congregational Home for the Aged after a week's illness. Interment was in Green-Wood Cemetery.

== Selected works ==
- Poems About Our Borough
