= Mary Downing =

- Born: Mary McCarthy c. 1815; Kilfadda More, Kilgarvan, County Kerry, Ireland
- Died: 1881; London, England
- Spouse: Washington Downing
- Children: Helena Shearer

Mary Downing (née McCarthy; c. 1815 – 1881) was an Irish poet and nationalist best known by her pen name "Christabel". Some of her poetry appeared in The Ballad Poetry of Ireland (1869), a collection of verse edited by Charles Gavan Duffy.

== Life ==
Mary Downing was born Mary McCarthy around 1815 in Kilfadda More, Kilgarvan, County Kerry. She was the eldest daughter of Daniel McCarthy, Esq. Over her life time, she used a number of pen names but is best known as "Christabel" or "Myrrha". Under these names, Downing published a large amount of her verse in the Cork Southern Reporter and the Freeholder. Under the names "M.F.D." and "C**l" she contributed several poems to the Dublin Citizen. Her best known work, Scraps from the Mountains, and Other Poems was published in 1840 in Dublin.

She married Washington Downing (died 1877) of Kenmare in the 1830s. He was the parliamentary reporter for the Daily News, so the couple moved to London. Washington's brother was Timothy McCarthy Downing. Her daughter Helena Shearer was a famous suffragette. Downing was a dedicated nationalist, and helped a number of the participants of the failed Young Irelander Rebellion of 1848 escape to France. Her father remained at the family home in Kilfadda More and in September 1848, James Stephens and Michael Doheny sheltered there while they planned their escape from Ireland. Doheny escaped on a ship bound for Bristol as a cleric. Initially, it was suggested that Stephens could pose as Downing's maid as he was so young and could have passed for a woman. Stephens refused to take part in this plan, and instead travelled with Downing on the Sabarina posing as her servant boy. Stephens hid at the Downings home in London before travelling on to France. When he returned to the United Kingdom in 1856, he passed through their house again.

The Downings lived at a number of London addresses, including Pentonville, Cumming Street, and lastly Hilldrop Crescent, Camden Town, where she was living in 1871. Downing died in 1881 in London. Papers relating to Downing are held as part of the McCarthy papers in the National Library of Ireland. The bicentenary of her birth was celebrated in Kilgarvan, County Kerry.
