= Helena Shearer =

Irish socialist and suffragist

Helena Paulina Shearer
- Born: Helena Paulina Downing c. 1842; Dublin, Ireland
- Died: 8 March 1885 (aged 42–43); Stoke Newington, England
- Spouse: John Ronald Shearer (m. 1881)

Helena Paulina Shearer (née Downing; c. 1842 – 8 March 1885) was an Irish socialist and suffragist in England.

== Life ==
Shearer was born in Dublin around 1842, the daughter of Washington Downing, a journalist, and Mary Frances Downing. She and her family moved to London by 1848. Her family was Catholic.

In 1875 she was on the executive committee of Emma Paterson's Women's Protective and Provident League where her knowledge of employment legislation and women suffrage campaigning and a talent for public speaking was noted. Her uncle, McCarthy Downing, was a member of Parliament for Cork. She also served the Vigilance Association for the Defence of Personal Rights and for the Amendment of the Law in points wherein it is Injurious to Women.

In 1879, she stood for election to the Tower Hamlets School Board. She proposed free non-religious education and more democratic control. Despite some good supporters she finished last and her critics blamed her over-confidence.

In 1881, she was speaking on a suffrage platform in Leicester. The same year on 24 November she married an accountant, John Shearer, in Bradford, Yorkshire, and she may well have served on the executive committee of the Married Women's Property Committee. She stood to be a Poor Law Guardian in Islington and she was elected which made her one of first five or six women to be elected to this role. This was a job traditionally done by men of property but she was later disqualified. She had identified that she needed to be a rate-payer and to enable this she had her home placed in her name. However the authorities refused her payment for rates which meant that she failed to qualify.

Shearer died in Stoke Newington in 1885 of tuberculosis.
