= National Woman Suffrage Association =

American 19th-century organization

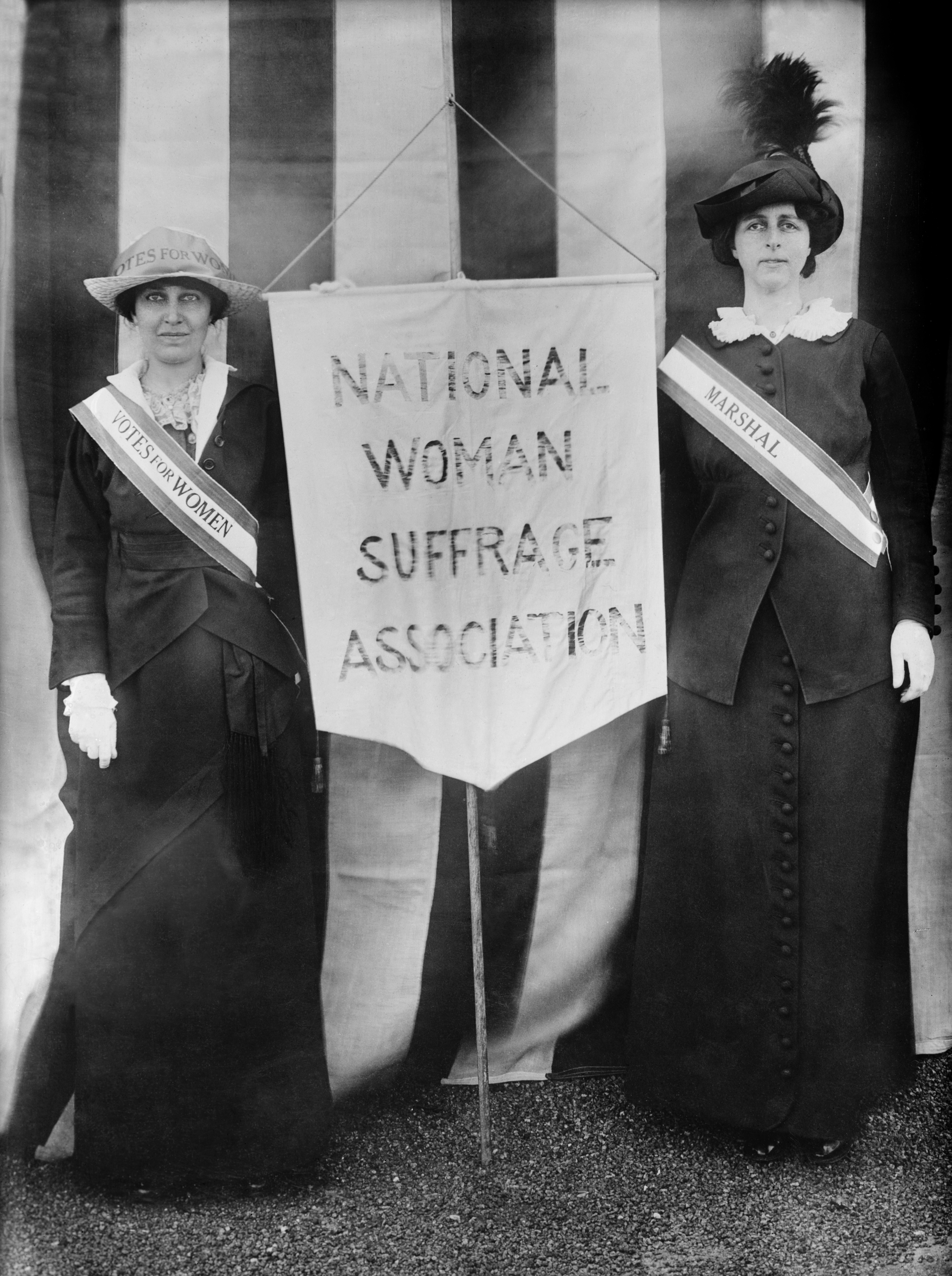
- Abbreviation: NWSA
- Successor: National American Woman Suffrage Association (NAWSA)
- Formation: 1869
- Dissolved: 1890
- Key people: Susan B. Anthony, Elizabeth Cady Stanton

The National Woman Suffrage Association (NWSA) was formed on May 15, 1869, to work for women's suffrage in the United States. Its main leaders were Susan B. Anthony and Elizabeth Cady Stanton. It was created after the women's rights movement split over the proposed Fifteenth Amendment to the U. S. Constitution, which would in effect extend voting rights to black men. One wing of the movement supported the amendment while the other, the wing that formed the NWSA, opposed it, insisting that voting rights be extended to all women and all African Americans at the same time.

The NWSA worked primarily at the federal level in its campaign for women's right to vote. In the early 1870s, it encouraged women to attempt to vote and to file lawsuits if prevented, arguing that the constitution implicitly enfranchised women through its guarantees of equal protection for all citizens. Many women attempted to vote, notably Susan B. Anthony, who was arrested and found guilty in a widely publicized trial. After the Supreme Court ruled that the constitution did not implicitly enfranchise women, the NWSA worked for an amendment that would do so explicitly.

The NWSA and its leaders also worked on related projects, such as a history of the women's suffrage movement and the establishment of the International Council of Women, which is still active. The split in the suffrage movement was healed in 1890, when the NWSA merged with its rival, the American Woman Suffrage Association (AWSA) to form the National American Woman Suffrage Association under the leadership of Anthony and Stanton.

== Background ==
Women's suffrage in the U.S. emerged as a significant issue in the mid-1800s. A key event was the first women's rights convention, the Seneca Falls Convention in 1848, which was initiated by Elizabeth Cady Stanton. Women's right to vote was endorsed at the convention only after a vigorous debate about an idea that was controversial even within the women's movement. Soon after the convention, however, it became a central tenet of the movement.

In 1851, Stanton and Susan B. Anthony formed a decades-long partnership that became important to the women's rights movement and to the future National Woman Suffrage Association (NWSA). For the next several years, they worked together for the abolition of slavery and for women's rights.

In 1866, Anthony and Stanton organized the Eleventh National Women's Rights Convention, the first since the Civil War began. The convention voted to transform itself into the American Equal Rights Association (AERA), whose purpose was to campaign for the equal rights of all citizens, especially the right of suffrage. Its members consisted mainly of activists in the women's rights and abolitionist movements, and its leadership included such prominent activists as Lucretia Mott, Lucy Stone and Frederick Douglass.

Over time, the AERA members whose primary interest was women's suffrage began to divide into two wings. One wing, whose leading figure was Lucy Stone, was willing for black men to achieve suffrage first, as the abolitionist movement insisted, and wanted to maintain close ties with the Republican Party. The other, whose leading figures were Stanton and Anthony, wanted women and black men be enfranchised at the same time and worked toward a politically independent women's movement that would no longer be dependent on abolitionists for financial and other resources. In 1868, Anthony and Stanton began publishing The Revolution, a weekly women's rights newspaper in New York City that became an important tool for supporting their wing of the movement.

The dispute became increasingly bitter after the Fifteenth Amendment to the U.S. Constitution was introduced, which would in effect enfranchise black men by prohibiting the denial of suffrage because of race. Lucy Stone supported the amendment even though she argued that suffrage for women would be more beneficial to the country than suffrage for black men. Stanton and Anthony opposed it, insisting that all women and all African Americans should be enfranchised at the same time. Stanton argued that by enfranchising almost all men while excluding all women, the amendment would give constitutional authority to the belief that men were superior to women, creating an "aristocracy of sex".

During the debate, Stanton wrote articles for The Revolution with language that was sometimes elitist and racially condescending. According to Cheris Kramarae and Lana Raknow, Stanton distinguished between " 'colorophobia' " and her own belief in the "evolutionary development of the human 'race.' Stanton, for example, sometimes referred to the 'lower orders of mankind', an indication of her belief that education and 'civilization' were needed to bring groups of people (particularly American Blacks and white working-class immigrants) out of barbarism and to the pinnacle of development...to admit Black men to enfranchisement was to admit them into 'manhood', making ever more difficult the task of redefining citizenship...for women." She also presumed that all "lower orders" promoted "low ideas of womanhood." Stanton wrote, "American women of wealth, education, virtue and refinement, if you do not wish the lower orders of Chinese, Africans, Germans and Irish, with their low ideas of womanhood to make laws for you and your daughters, to be your rulers, judges, and jurors---to dictate not only the civil, but moral codes by which you shall be governed, awake to the dangers of your present position, and demand, too, that women too shall be represented in government!"

These beliefs and contentions corresponded with her published comments from inaugural issues of The Revolution. In 1868, for instance, she argued that "there is only one safe, sure way to build a government, and that is on the equality of all its citizens, male and female, black and white...Just so if woman finds it hard to bear the oppressive laws of a few Saxon Fathers, of the best orders of manhood, what may she not be called to endure when all the lower orders, natives and foreigners, Dutch, Irish, Chinese and African, legislate for her and her daughters?" Ellen DuBois referred to this particularly litany of "lower orders" as "betraying her underlying elitism", whereas Sue Davis renounced her question as one in a series that "included racist and nativist comments." Stanton added that U.S. Senators "degrade" women "in their political status, below unwashed and unlettered ditch-diggers, boot-blacks, hostlers, butchers, and barbers." Stanton then objected to laws being made for women by "Patrick and Sambo and Hans and Yung Tung who do not know the difference between a Monarchy and a Republic, and who never read the Declaration of Independence or Webster's spelling book."

== Formation of the National Woman Suffrage Association ==
The AERA essentially collapsed after an acrimonious convention in 1869, and two rival women's suffrage organizations were created in its wake. The National Woman Suffrage Association (NWSA) was created on May 15, 1869, two days after what turned out to be the AERA's last convention, with Anthony and Stanton as its primary leaders. The American Woman Suffrage Association (AWSA) was formed in November 1869, with Lucy Stone as its primary leader. The AWSA was initially larger and better funded, but Stanton and Anthony were more widely known as leaders of the women's suffrage movement and were more influential in setting its direction.

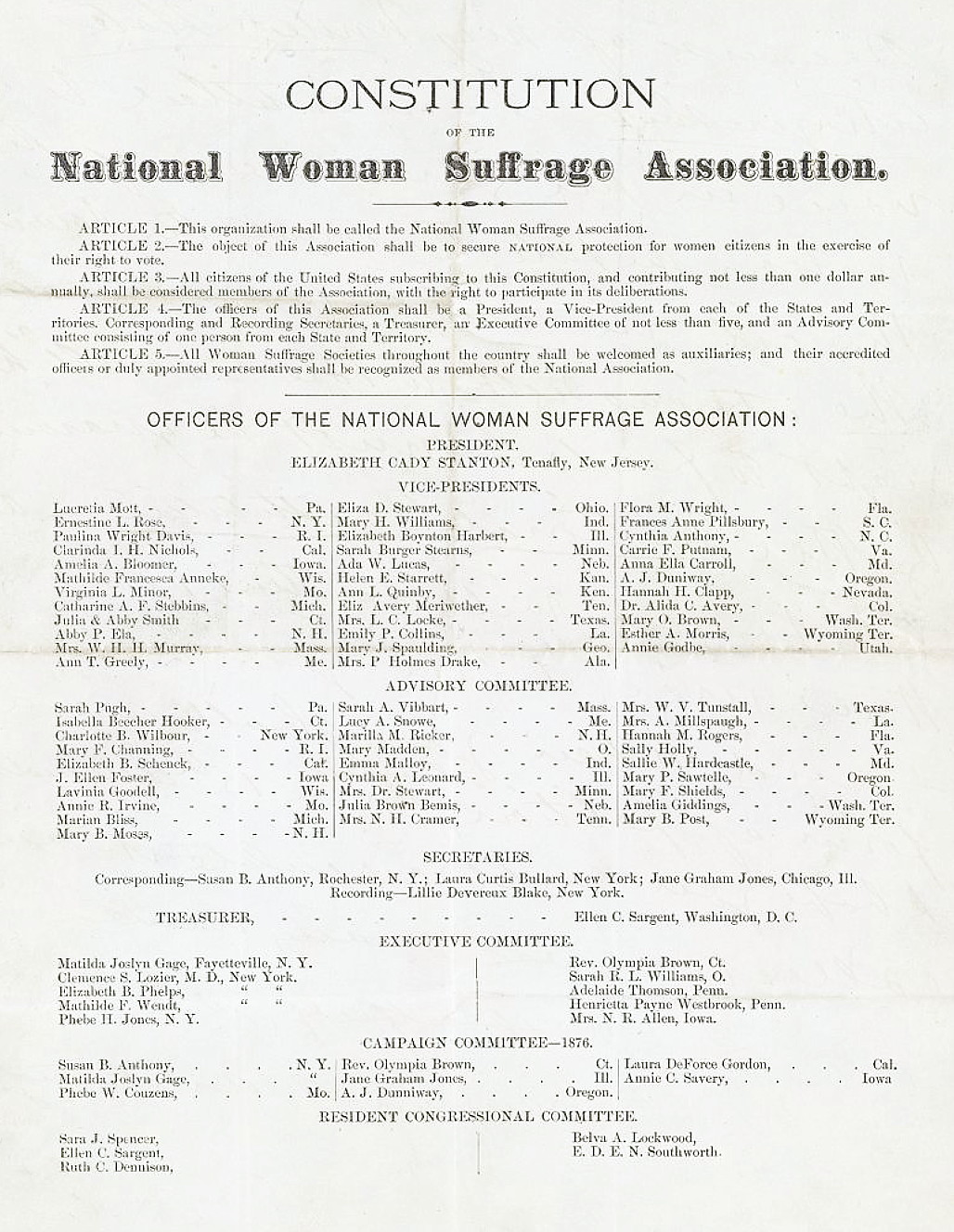
Constitution and officers of the National Woman Suffrage Association in 1876

Membership of the NWSA came partly from activists in organizations that Anthony and Stanton had created. One of those was the Women's Loyal National League, whose 5000 members had by 1864 completed a petition drive, the largest in the nation's history, in support of an amendment to abolish slavery. Another was the Working Women's Association, which began as an organization of wage-earning women but evolved into one consisting almost entirely of journalists, doctors and other middle-class working women. Its members formed the core of the New York City segment of the NWSA, where the NWSA was headquartered.

== Comparison to AWSA ==
Even after the Fifteenth Amendment was ratified in 1870, some important differences remained between the two organizations, and others emerged over time.

The NWSA worked mostly at the federal level, focusing on a constitutional amendment to achieve women's suffrage, while the AWSA worked toward the same goal mostly at the state level. The NWSA's meetings were open to everyone, but the AWSA allowed only delegates from recognized state organizations to vote at its meetings, although any member could attend and speak. The NWSA initially dealt with several women's issues, such as divorce reform and equal pay for women, while the AWSA focused almost exclusively on suffrage. The AWSA's membership included both women and men, and its first president was a man, Henry Ward Beecher. Stanton had originally proposed that the NWSA's membership be limited to women, but her proposal was not accepted. In practice, however, the overwhelming majority of the NWSA members and officers were women. The NWSA held its conventions in Washington in accordance with its strategy of working primarily at the federal level, while the AWSA, working mainly at the state level, met in various cities across the country.

The author of a study of African American women in the suffrage movement lists nine who participated in the AWSA during the 1870s and six who participated in the NWSA. Stanton, a NWSA leader, "moved to sever the women's rights movement from its earlier moorings in the antislavery tradition." She periodically "appealed to racial and ethnic prejudices, arguing that native-born white women deserved the vote more than non-whites and immigrants." Lee Boomer and New-York Historical Society educators noted that "while the NWSA did not prohibit Black women from joining at the national level, local [NWSA] organizations could reject their participation."

== Early years ==
Many suffragists were appalled by the split and insisted on reunification. Theodore Tilton, a newspaper editor and women's rights advocate, initiated a petition drive calling for an end to the split. In April 1870, he convened a meeting of members of both organizations in an attempt to merge the two groups. Anthony opposed the idea of merger, as did her rival Lucy Stone. The NWSA sent three official representatives to the meeting who reported that their organization would agree to a merger only if the new organization agreed to work toward a Sixteenth Amendment to enfranchise women. Lucy Stone and two other AWSA members who were present as unofficial representatives of their organization left the meeting at that point. Those remaining, including some non-affiliated activists, formed a new organization, the Union Woman Suffrage Association (UWSA) with Tilton as president and a Sixteenth Amendment as its central goal. Soon afterward, the executive committee of the moribund AERA met and voted, over Stone's objection, to merge into the UWSA. The next month, the NWSA itself merged into the UWSA, which essentially became the NWSA under a new name.

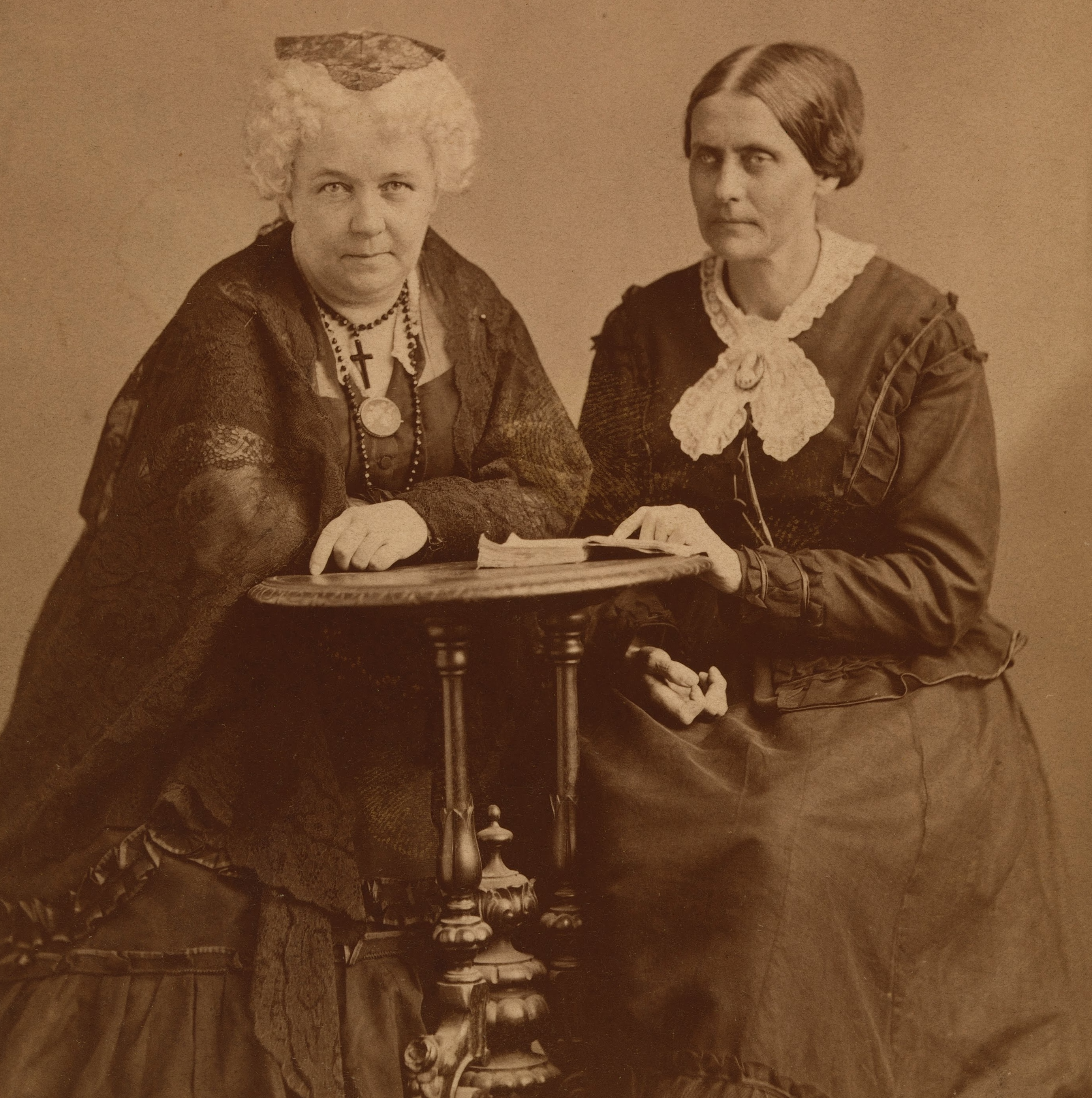
Elizabeth Cady Stanton and Susan B. Anthony about 1870

In May 1870, Anthony was forced to sell The Revolution because of mounting debts, thereby losing the NWSA's primary media voice. The NWSA afterwards depended on smaller periodicals, such as The National Citizen and Ballot Box, edited by Matilda Joslyn Gage, and The Woman's Tribune, edited by Clara Bewick Colby, to represent its viewpoint.

The NWSA benefited from the extensive lecture tours that Stanton and Anthony undertook, which brought new recruits into the organization and strengthened it at the local, state and national levels. Their journeys during that period covered a distance that was unmatched by any other reformer or politician. From 1869 to 1879, Stanton traveled eight months of the year on the lecture circuit, usually delivering one lecture per day, two on Sundays. In one year alone, Anthony traveled 13,000 miles and gave at least 170 lectures.

The NWSA did not have a national office, its mailing address being simply that of one of the officers. Anthony and Stanton did not receive a salary from the organization, supporting themselves with the money they earned by lecturing. In Anthony's case, the money flowed the other way, with her lecture fees helping to fund the organization after she had paid The Revolution's debts.

The fact that Anthony was unmarried gave her a legal advantage in building the organization. A married woman at that time had the legal status of feme covert, which, among other things, excluded her from signing contracts (she had to convince her husband to sign for her). As Anthony had no husband, she had the legal status of a feme sole, enabling her to sign contracts for convention halls and printed materials.

== New Departure ==
In 1869, Virginia Minor, a member of the NWSA, and her husband Francis developed the idea that achieving women's suffrage did not require a Sixteenth Amendment. Their approach, which became known as the New Departure, was based on the belief that women were already implicitly enfranchised by the U.S. Constitution. Their strategy relied heavily on the Fourteenth Amendment, which says, "No State shall make or enforce any law which shall abridge the privileges or immunities of citizens of the United States … nor deny to any person within its jurisdiction the equal protection of the laws."

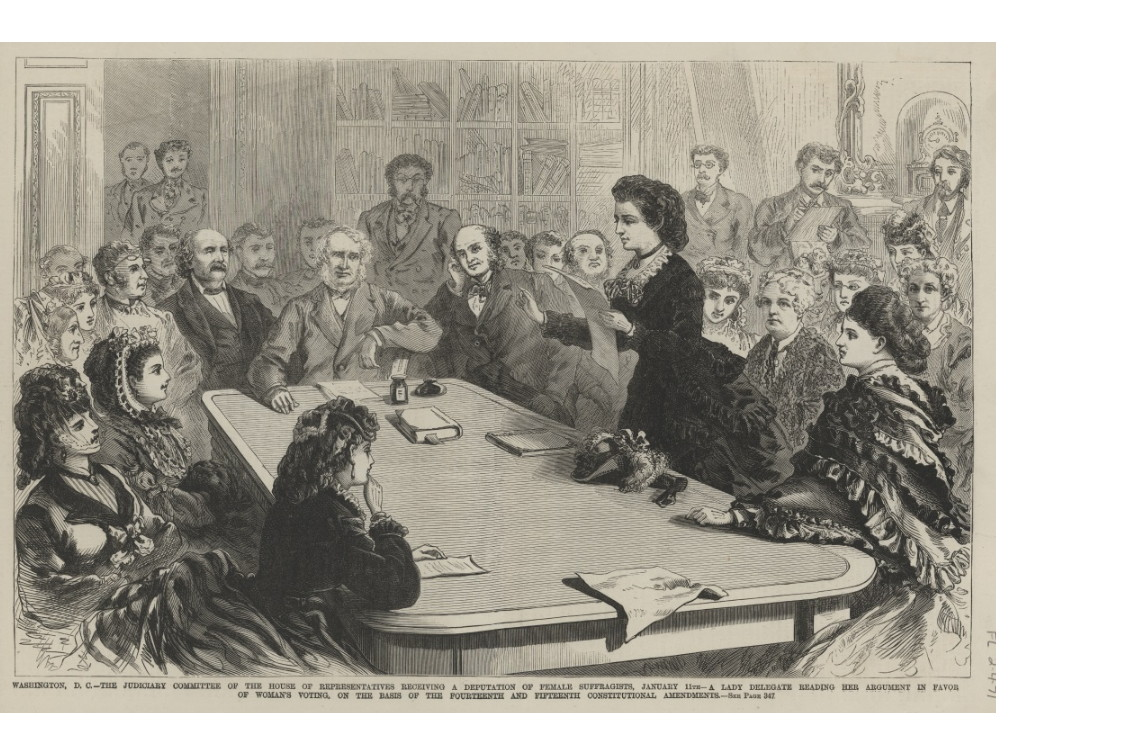
Victoria Woodhull speaking before the House Judiciary Committee. Stanton, with white curls, is sitting directly behind her.

In January 1871, the UWSA delayed the opening session of its annual convention in Washington so its members could hear the historic address to the House Judiciary Committee by Victoria Woodhull, the first woman to speak before a Congressional body. A stockbroker with wealthy backers but little previous connection to the women's movement, she presented a modified version of the New Departure strategy. Instead of asking the courts to rule that the Constitution implicitly enfranchised women, she asked Congress to pass a declaratory act to accomplish the same goal. The committee did not accept her proposal. Woodhull was invited to give the same speech to the UWSA's afternoon session and was greeted there with enthusiasm.

Woodhull's reputation as a women's suffrage leader continued to rise afterwards. Both Stanton and Anthony eagerly supported her at first, although Anthony became increasingly wary of her. At the UWSA's 1872 convention, Woodhull attempted to commandeer the organization, urging its delegates to meet the next day in a different hall to form a new political party with herself as its candidate for president of the United States. In the chaotic situation that followed, Anthony shouted that the UWSA would meet the next day as usual and abruptly adjourned the session. The UWSA did meet the next day as planned, although with fewer participants because most of them had gone to the Woodhull event instead. The UWSA voted to transform itself at this meeting into a reconstituted NWSA with Anthony as president.

Later that year, Woodhull published details of an affair between Elizabeth Tilton, wife of Theodore Tilton, a prominent NWSA ally, and Reverend Henry Ward Beecher, the first president of the AWSA, seriously damaging the reputation of the entire women's movement. Woodhull did not play a significant role in the women's suffrage movement afterwards.

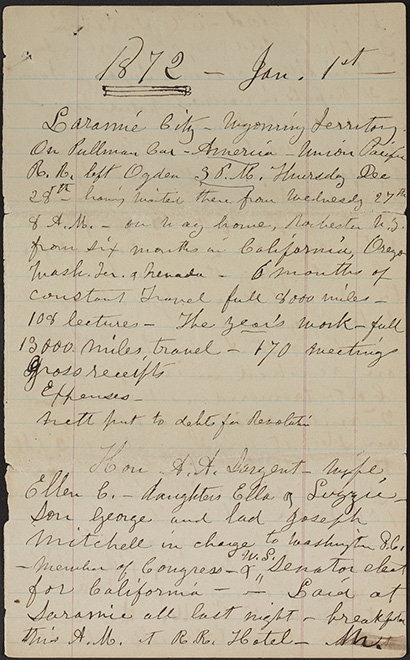
Anthony's diary for January 1, 1872, noting her arduous traveling and speaking schedule during the previous year and her new friendship with Senator-elect Aaron A. Sargent, who later introduced what would become the Nineteenth Amendment to the U.S. Constitution, and his wife Ellen Clark Sargent, who became treasurer of the NWSA.

In 1871 the NWSA officially adopted the New Departure strategy, encouraging women to attempt to vote and to file lawsuits if denied that right. Soon hundreds of women tried to vote in dozens of localities.

== Challenging the denial of voting rights ==
In 1872, Susan B. Anthony convinced some election officials to allow her to vote in that year's presidential elections, for which she was arrested and found guilty in a widely publicized trial. The judge at the trial was Justice Ward Hunt, who had recently been appointed to the U.S. Supreme Court and who conducted the trial as part of the federal circuit court system at that time.

The trial, United States v. Susan B. Anthony, was closely followed by the national press. Following a rule of common law at that time which prevented criminal defendants in federal courts from testifying, Hunt refused to allow Anthony to speak until the verdict had been delivered. At the end of the trial, Justice Hunt delivered his opinion, which he had put in writing, and directed the jury to deliver a guilty verdict. When he asked Anthony if she had anything to say, she responded with "the most famous speech in the history of the agitation for woman suffrage", according to Ann D. Gordon, a historian of the women's movement. Repeatedly ignoring the judge's order to stop talking and sit down, she castigated him for denying her a trial by jury, but said that even if he had allowed the jury to discuss the case, she still would have been denied a trial by a jury of her peers because women were not allowed to be jurors.

The Supreme Court ruled in 1875 in Minor v. Happersett that "the Constitution of the United States does not confer the right of suffrage upon anyone". The NWSA was obliged to return to the far more difficult strategy of achieving suffrage by constitutional amendment. In 1878, Senator Aaron A. Sargent, who was married to NWSA treasurer Ellen Clark Sargent, introduced into Congress the women's suffrage amendment that more than forty years later would become the Nineteenth Amendment to the U. S. Constitution. Its text is identical to that of the Fifteenth Amendment except that it prohibits the denial of suffrage because of sex rather than race.

== Centennial of the Declaration of Independence ==
On July 4, 1876, The United States celebrated its 100th anniversary with a ceremony in Philadelphia at Independence Hall, where the Declaration of Independence was approved on July 4, 1776. In preparation for the event, the NWSA established headquarters nearby and began drawing up "articles of impeachment" against the country's male "Political Sovereigns". NWSA officers asked permission to present a Declaration of Rights for Women at the official celebration, but they were refused. Despite the lack of permission, five women, headed by Anthony, walked onto the platform during the ceremony and handed their Declaration to Senator Thomas Ferry who was the acting Vice President of the United States, and the official in charge of the celebration. As they left, they handed out copies to the crowd. Stepping onto an unoccupied bandstand outside the hall, Anthony read the Declaration to a large crowd and invited everyone to a NWSA convention at the nearby Unitarian church to hear Stanton, Lucretia Mott and other speakers.

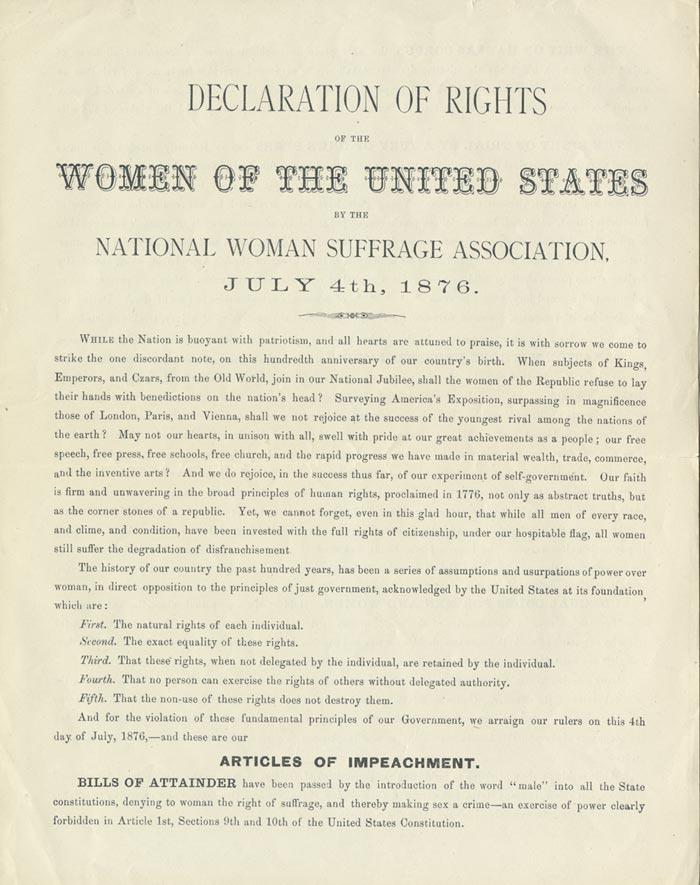
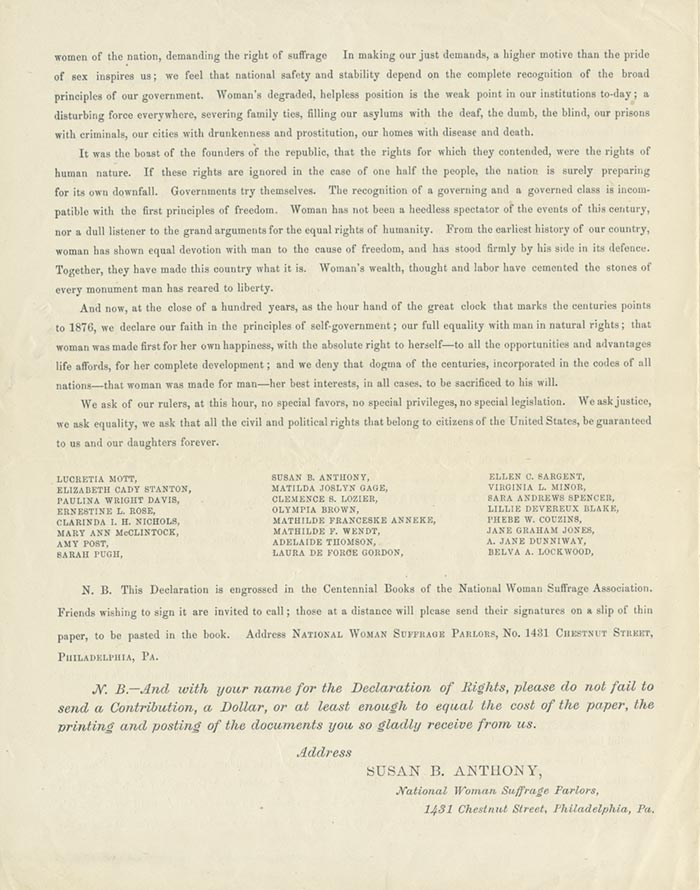
First and last page of the four-page "Declaration of Rights of the Women of the United States", written in 1876 by the National Woman Suffrage Association for the centennial of U. S. Declaration of Independence

The Declaration was signed by Susan B. Anthony and these other leading members of the NWSA: Lucretia Mott, Elizabeth Cady Stanton, Paulina Wright Davis, Ernestine L. Rose, Clarina I. H. Nichols, Mary Ann McClintock, Amy Post, Sarah Pugh, Matilda Joslyn Gage, Clemence Sophia Harned Lozier, Olympia Brown, Mathilde Franziska Anneke, Mathilde F. Wendt, Adelaide Thomson, Laura de Force Gordon, Ellen Clark Sargent, Virginia L. Minor, Sara Andrews Spencer, Lillie Devereux Blake, Phoebe Couzins, Jane Graham Jones, Abigail Scott Duniway, Belva A. Lockwood.

Lucretia Mott, former president of the AERA, was listed first among those who signed the Declaration and was a vice president of the NWSA. According to Sally Gregory McMillen, a historian of the women's movement during this period, Lucretia Mott "avoided taking sides" in the split in the women's movement, providing support to both sides.

== History of Woman Suffrage ==
In 1876, Anthony and Stanton began working on the History of Woman Suffrage. Originally envisioned as a modest publication that could be produced quickly, the history evolved into a six-volume work of more than 5700 pages written over a period of 41 years, preserving a rich history that otherwise might have been lost. The first three volumes, which cover the movement up to 1885, were produced primarily by Anthony and Stanton. Anthony handled the production details while Stanton wrote most of the text. Matilda Joslyn Gage, another leading member of the NWSA, wrote three chapters of the first volume but was forced to abandon the project afterwards because of the illness of her husband. After Stanton's death, Anthony published Volume 4 with the help of Ida Husted Harper. After Anthony's death, Harper completed the last two volumes, bringing history up to 1920.

Stanton and Anthony had encouraged their rival Lucy Stone to assist with the work, or at least to send material that could be used by someone else to write the history of her wing of the movement, but she refused to cooperate in any way. Stanton's daughter Harriot Stanton Blatch, wrote the 120-page chapter on Stone and the AWSA, which appears in Volume 2. Even so, the History of Woman Suffrage places Stanton, Anthony and the NWSA at the center of the movement's history and marginalizes the role of Stone and the AWSA.

== International Council of Women ==
Anthony traveled to Europe in 1883, linking up with Stanton, who had arrived a few months earlier to visit her daughter, whose husband was British. Over a period of nine months, they met with leaders of various European women's movements and began laying the foundation for an international women's organization.

The NWSA agreed to host the founding congress of the organization that Stanton and Anthony were working toward. The first congress of the International Council of Women (ICW) met in Washington in 1888 with delegates from fifty-three women's organizations in nine countries. The delegates represented various organizations, including suffrage associations, professional groups, literary clubs, temperance unions, labor leagues and missionary societies. The AWSA participated in the congress. The ICW convention brought increased publicity and respectability to the women's movement, especially when President Grover Cleveland honored the delegates by inviting them to a reception at the White House. Still active, ICW is associated with the United Nations.

== Reunification of the movement ==
Lucy Stone initiated the reunification of the rival suffrage organizations. She was seventy years old and in declining health, and the AWSA was losing strength. Anthony, by contrast, was by that point, "among the senior political figures in the United States", according to a prominent historian of women's history. Stanton, a popular speaker and a prolific writer of articles for newspapers and magazines, was also well known.

The AWSA's annual meeting in November 1877 passed a resolution authorizing Stone to confer with Anthony about the possibility of a merger. The proposal did not generate significant controversy within the AWSA. There was strong opposition within the NWSA, however. Ida Husted Harper, Anthony's co-worker and biographer, said the NWSA meetings that dealt with this issue "were the most stormy in the history of the association." Matilda Joslyn Gage, an opponent of the merger, formed a competing organization called the Woman's National Liberal Union, but it did not attract a significant following, and plans for merger proceeded.

The NWSA and the AWSA met in a joint convention in Washington and formed the National American Woman Suffrage Association (NAWSA) on February 18, 1890. At Anthony's insistence, Stanton agreed to accept its presidency. This was largely a symbolic move; the day after she was elected president, Stanton sailed to her daughter's home in England, where she stayed for eighteen months, leaving Anthony effectively in charge. Stone was elected chair of the executive committee.

The NAWSA developed into the nation's largest voluntary organization, with two million members. After women's suffrage was achieved in 1920 by the passage of the Nineteenth Amendment to the U.S. Constitution, the NAWSA transformed itself into the League of Women Voters, which is still active.

== Some leading members other than Anthony and Stanton ==
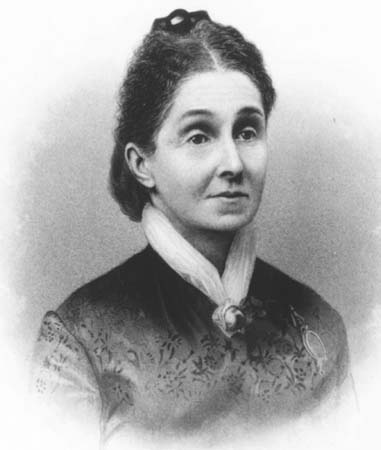
Virginia Minor, co-developer of the NWSA's New Departure strategy

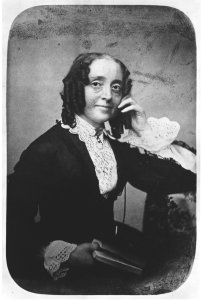
Ernestine Rose, pioneer worker for women's rights, member of first NWSA executive committee.

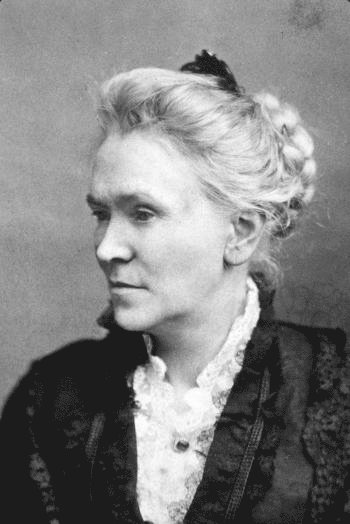
Matilda Joslyn Gage, president of the NWSA 1875–86, co-author of History of Woman Suffrage, author of Woman, Church and State

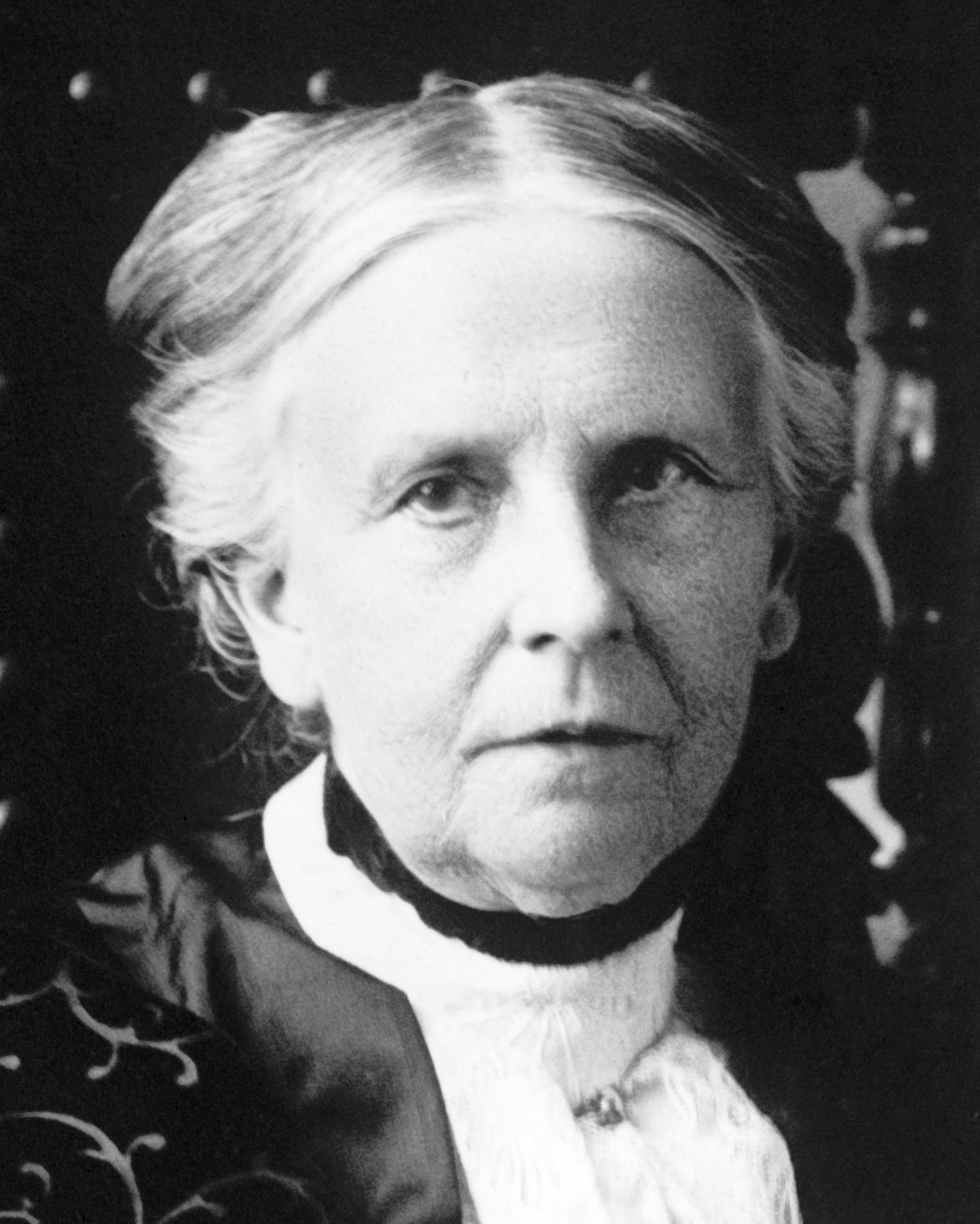
Olympia Brown, first woman ordained as clergy with the consent of her denomination

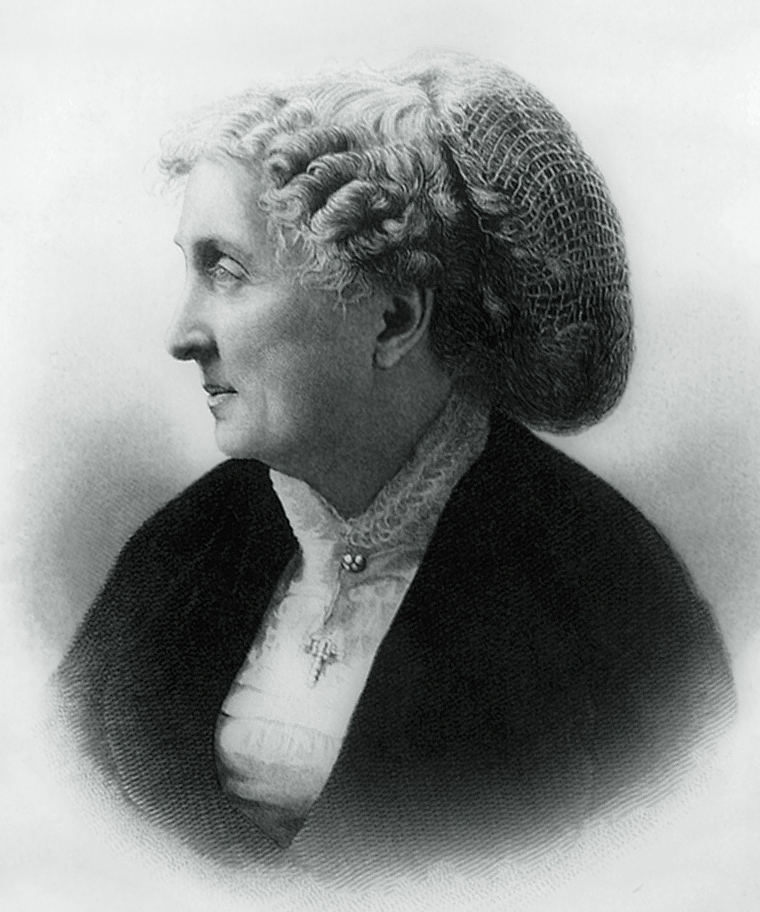
Paulina Kellogg Wright Davis, main organizer of the first National Women's Rights Convention, author of The History of the National Woman's Rights Movement

== See also ==
- List of American suffragists
- List of suffragists and suffragettes
- List of women's rights activists
- Timeline of women's suffrage
- Timeline of women's suffrage in the United States
- Women's suffrage organizations

== Bibliography ==
- Anthony, Susan B.; Harper, Ida Husted (1902), History of Woman Suffrage, Vol. 4, Rollenbeck Press, Indianapolis, Indiana.
- Barry, Kathleen (1988). Susan B. Anthony: A Biography of a Singular Feminist. New York: Ballantine Books. ISBN 0-345-36549-6.
- Buhle, Mari Jo; Buhle, Paul editors (1978). The Concise History of Woman Suffrage. University of Illinois. ISBN 0-252-00669-0.
- DuBois, Ellen Carol (1978). Feminism and Suffrage: The Emergence of an Independent Women's Movement in America, 1848–1869. Ithaca, NY: Cornell University Press. ISBN 0-8014-8641-6.
- DuBois, Ellen Carol (1998). Woman Suffrage and Women's Rights. New York: New York University Press. ISBN 0-8147-1901-5.
- Dudden, Faye E., (2011). Fighting Chance: The Struggle over Woman Suffrage and Black Suffrage in Reconstruction America. New York: Oxford University Press. ISBN 978-0-19-977263-6.
- Flexner, Eleanor (1959). Century of Struggle. Cambridge, MA: Belknap Press of Harvard University Press. ISBN 978-0674106536.
- Gordon, Ann D., ed. (2000). The Selected Papers of Elizabeth Cady Stanton and Susan B. Anthony: Against an aristocracy of sex, 1866 to 1873. Vol. 2 of 6. New Brunswick, NJ: Rutgers University Press. ISBN 0-8135-2318-4.
- Gordon, Ann D., ed. (2003). The Selected Papers of Elizabeth Cady Stanton and Susan B. Anthony: National protection for national citizens, 1873 to 1880. Vol. 3 of 6. New Brunswick, NJ: Rutgers University Press. ISBN 0-8135-2319-2.
- Gordon, Ann D. (2005). "The Trial of Susan B. Anthony" (PDF). Federal Judicial Center.
- Gordon, Ann D. (2009). The Selected Papers of Elizabeth Cady Stanton and Susan B. Anthony Their Place Inside the Body-Politic, 1887 to 1895. Rutgers University Press. ISBN 9780813564401.
- Griffith, Elisabeth (1985). In Her Own Right: The Life of Elizabeth Cady Stanton. Oxford University Press; New York, NY. ISBN 0-19-503729-4
- McMillen, Sally Gregory (2008). Seneca Falls and the origins of the women's rights movement. Oxford University Press. ISBN 0-19-518265-0.
- Rakow, Lana F. and Kramarae, Cheris, editors (2001). The Revolution in Words: Righting Women 1868–1871, New York: Routledge. ISBN 978-0-415-25689-6.
- Scott, Anne Firor; Scott, Andrew MacKay (1982). One Half the People: The Fight for Woman Suffrage. Chicago: University of Illinois Press. ISBN 0-252-01005-1.
- Sherr, Lynn (1995). Failure Is Impossible: Susan B. Anthony in Her Own Words. New York: Random House. ISBN 0-8129-2430-4
- Stanton, Elizabeth Cady; Anthony, Susan B.; Gage, Matilda Joslyn (1887), History of Woman Suffrage, Volume 2, Rochester, NY: Susan B. Anthony (Charles Mann printer).
- Tetrault, Lisa (2014). The Myth of Seneca Falls: Memory and the Women's Suffrage Movement, 1848-1898. University of North Carolina Press. ISBN 978-1-4696-1427-4.
- Venet, Wendy Hamand (1991). Neither Ballots nor Bullets: Women Abolitionists and the Civil War. Charlottesville, VA: University Press of Virginia. ISBN 978-0813913421.
- Ward, Geoffrey C., with essays by Martha Saxton, Ann D. Gordon and Ellen Carol DuBois (1999). Not for Ourselves Alone: The Story of Elizabeth Cady Stanton and Susan B. Anthony. New York: Alfred Knopf. ISBN 0-375-40560-7
