= The Revolution (newspaper) =

19th-century American women's-rights newspaper

- “Men their rights and nothing more; women their rights and nothing less.”
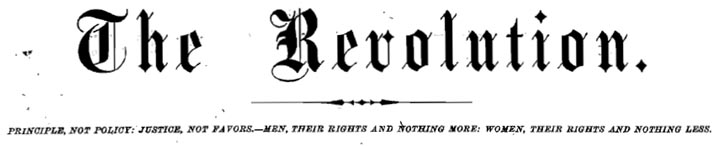
- Founder(s): Susan B. Anthony; Elizabeth Cady Stanton; Parker Pillsbury
- Founded: January 1868
- Ceased publication: February 1872
- Language: English
- City: New York, New York
- Country: US

The Revolution was a newspaper established by women's rights activists Susan B. Anthony and Elizabeth Cady Stanton in New York City. It was published weekly between January 8, 1868, and February 17, 1872. With a combative style that matched its name, it primarily focused on women's rights, especially prohibiting discrimination against women's suffrage in the United States, and women's suffrage in general. It also covered other topics, such as politics, the labor movement, and finance. Anthony managed the business aspects of the paper, while Stanton was co-editor along with Parker Pillsbury, an abolitionist and a supporter of women's rights.

Initial funding was provided by George Francis Train, a controversial businessman who supported women's rights but alienated many activists with his views on politics and race. The funding that he arranged was enough to start the newspaper but not enough to sustain it. After twenty-nine months, mounting debts forced Anthony to transfer the paper to Laura Curtis Bullard, a wealthy women's rights activist who gave it a less radical tone. The paper published its last issue less than two years later.

Its significance was greater than its short lifespan would indicate. Established during a period when a split was developing within the women's rights movement, it gave Stanton and Anthony a means for expressing their views about the issues being disputed when it otherwise would have been difficult for them to make their voices heard. It helped them strengthen their wing of the movement and prepare the way for an organization to represent it.

== History ==
=== Background ===
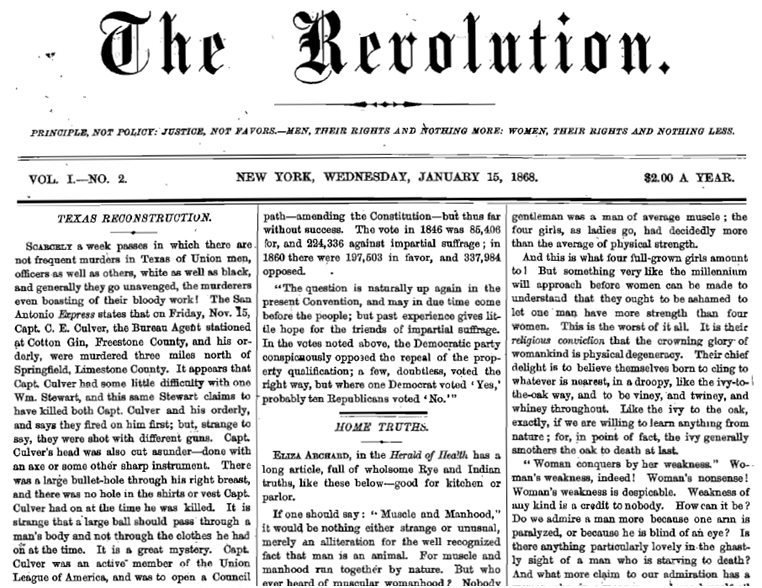
Front page of The Revolution, January 15, 1868

The creators of The Revolution, Susan B. Anthony and Elizabeth Cady Stanton, were leading women's rights activists. Stanton was an organizer of the Seneca Falls Convention in 1848, the first women's rights convention, and the primary author of its Declaration of Sentiments. At the request of Lucy Stone, another leading activist who had organized several of the National Women's Rights Conventions during the 1850s, Anthony performed much of the organizational work for the 1859 national convention and Stanton did the same in 1860. Together Anthony and Stanton established the Women's Loyal National League in 1863, which gathered a massive number of petitions calling for a constitutional amendment to abolish slavery in the U.S. The two activists remained close friends and co-workers for the remainder of their lives.

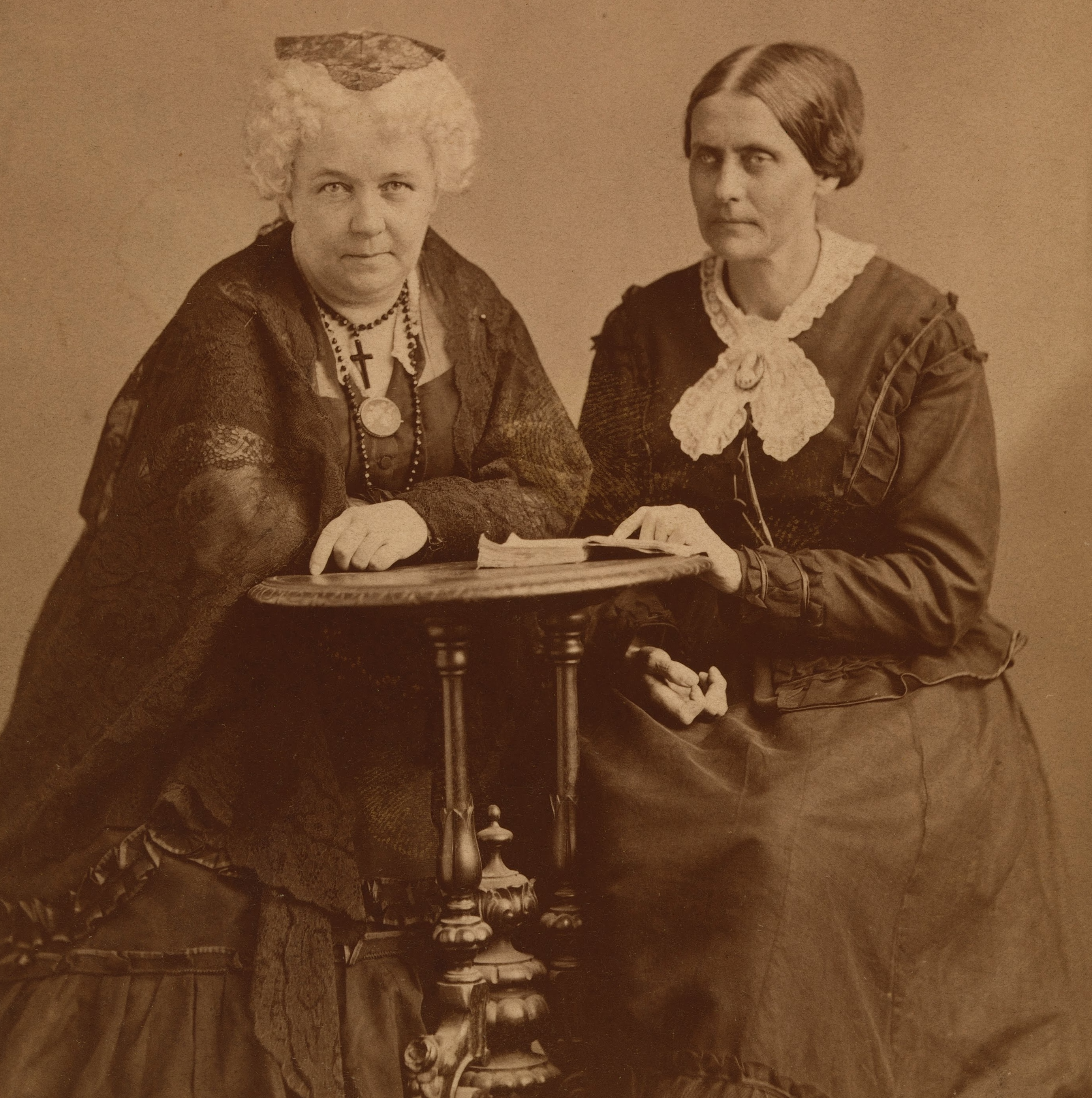
Elizabeth Cady Stanton and Susan B. Anthony about 1870

They established The Revolution during a period when a split was developing within the women's rights movement. A major point of disagreement was the proposed Fifteenth Amendment to the U.S. Constitution, which would prohibit the denial of suffrage because of race. Most radical social reformers supported it, but Stanton and Anthony opposed it unless it was accompanied by another amendment that would prohibit the denial of suffrage because of sex. Otherwise, they said, the Fifteenth Amendment, which would in effect enfranchise all men while excluding all women, would create an "aristocracy of sex" by giving constitutional authority to the belief that men were superior to women.

Women's rights activists also differed over the Republican Party and the abolitionist movement, which together had provided leadership for ending slavery in the U.S. in 1865. The leading figures in the women's rights movement strongly opposed slavery (Anthony herself had been on the staff of the American Anti-Slavery Society), and many activists felt a sense of loyalty toward the Republican and abolitionist leadership. Stanton and Anthony were sharply critical of both, however, for failing to support women's suffrage.

A pivotal event was the 1867 campaign conducted in Kansas by the American Equal Rights Association (AERA) in support of two state referendums, one that would enfranchise African American men and one that would enfranchise women. The AERA had been established the previous year, with Anthony and Stanton among its founders, to support the rights of both women and blacks. Leaders of the abolitionist movement, however, refused to support the AERA's Kansas campaign, even though suffrage for black men was an abolitionist priority, because they did not want the two suffrage campaigns to be combined. The AERA had encountered similar obstacles during an earlier campaign in New York State. Campaigning in Kansas with the AERA in support of both referendums, Anthony and Stanton were angered not only because national abolitionist leaders were withholding support but also because local Republicans had organized a committee to oppose the women's suffrage referendum. Feeling betrayed, Stanton and Anthony stirred up a storm of protest by accepting help during the last days of the campaign from George Francis Train, a wealthy supporter of women's rights who was a Democrat and an outspoken racist. Train harshly criticized the Republican Party, making no secret of his intention to tarnish its progressive image and create splits within it. When the Kansas campaign ended in November 1867 with the defeat of both referendums, the divisions within the women's movement began to deepen.

The women's rights movement had greatly reduced its activity during the Civil War (1861−1865) because its leaders wanted to apply their energy to the fight against slavery. After the war, leaders of the abolitionist movement pressured them to continue to delay their campaign for women's suffrage until suffrage for black males had been achieved. Stanton and Anthony felt their movement was being marginalized. Later they said, "Our liberal men counseled us to silence during the war, and we were silent on our own wrongs; they counseled us again to silence in Kansas and New York, lest we should defeat 'negro suffrage,' and threatened if we were not, we might fight the battle alone. We chose the latter, and were defeated. But standing alone we learned our power... woman must lead the way to her own enfranchisement."

It was becoming difficult for Stanton and Anthony, however, to make their voices heard. The abolitionist press, which had traditionally been the most dependable provider of news coverage for the women's rights movement, was no longer willing to play that role for their wing of the movement. Other major periodicals associated with the radical social reform movements had either become more conservative or had quit publishing or soon would. Little help could be expected from women's rights periodicals because so few remained. The mainstream press had begun to treat the women's movement as old news after more than a decade of treating it as a novelty worthy of news coverage.

=== Stanton and Pillsbury editorship ===
==== Establishing the newspaper ====
Defying pressure to sever their relationship with Train, Stanton and Anthony instead made a deal with him to establish a weekly newspaper that they would operate with his financial backing, which he indicated could be as much as $100,000. Train and his associate David Melliss would have space to express their views, but otherwise Stanton and Anthony would be free to run the paper in the interests of women. Plans were quickly made plans for a national newspaper with a circulation goal that would make it as large as a major New York daily. Anthony hoped to grow it eventually into a daily paper with its own printing press, all owned and operated by women.

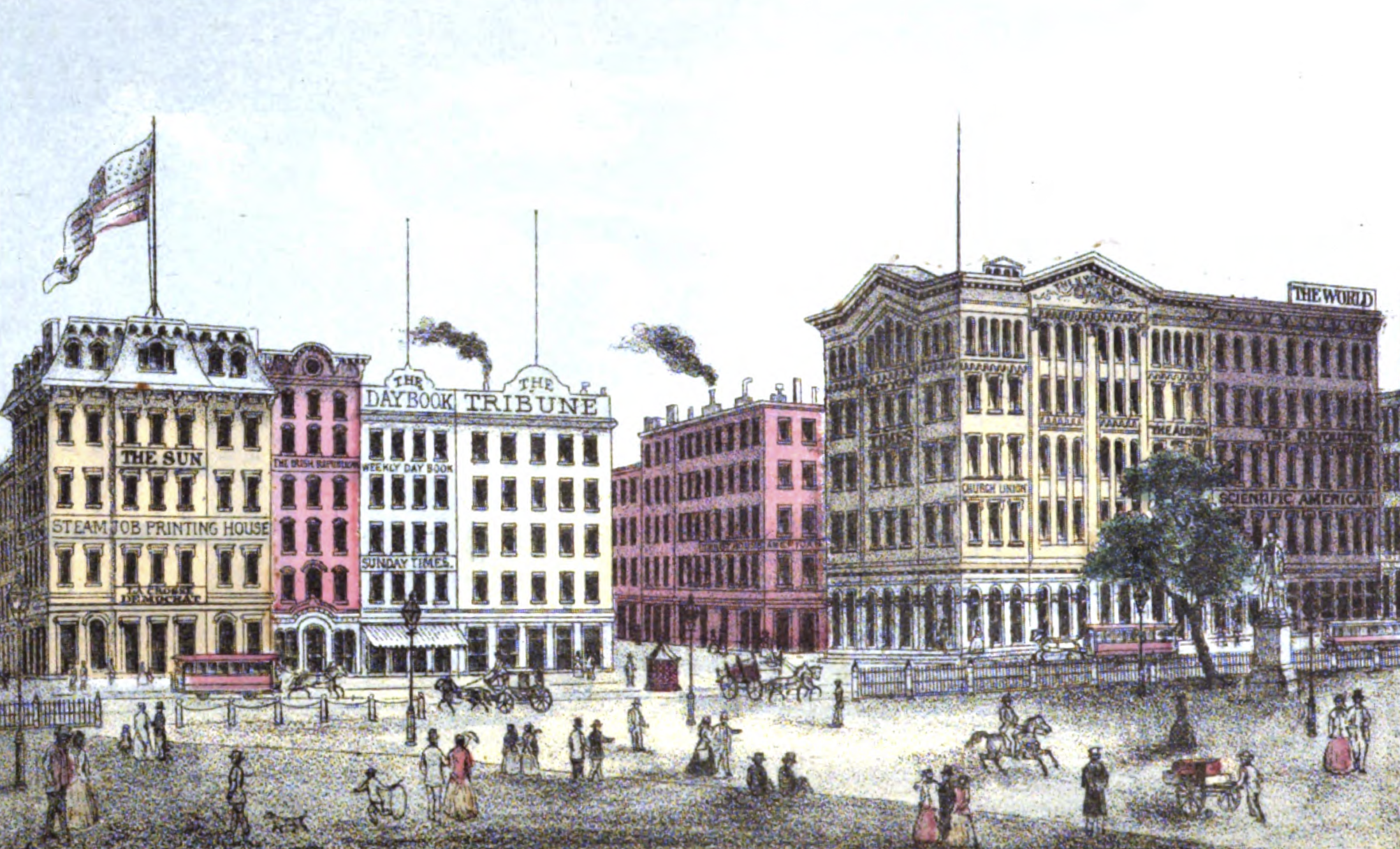
Printing House Square in Manhattan in 1868, showing the sign for The Revolution's office at 37 Park Row at the far right below The World and above Scientific American

The first issue of The Revolution was published on January 8, 1868, two months after the end of the AERA's Kansas campaign. The newspaper was given its name, said Stanton and Anthony in its first issue, because "The name speaks its purpose. It is to revolutionize." Stanton later elaborated that, "it is not the ballot alone that woman needs for her safety and protection, but a revolution in our political, religious and social systems; in fact the entire reorganization of society." The paper generated publicity with its first issue by announcing that Anthony had convinced U.S. President Andrew Johnson to buy a subscription.

The Revolution's offices were in New York City. The paper was published weekly on quality newsprint, with 16 pages per issue and 3 columns per page. Its publishers did not possess their own printing equipment but instead depended on the services of a print shop that paid its male and female employees on an equal basis. Anthony managed the business aspects of the paper while Stanton was co-editor along with Parker Pillsbury. Initially Stanton wrote most of the material related to women's rights. The newspaper's motto, prominently displayed on the front page, was, "Principle, not policy; Justice, not favors: Men, their rights and nothing more; Women, their rights and nothing less."

==== Content ====
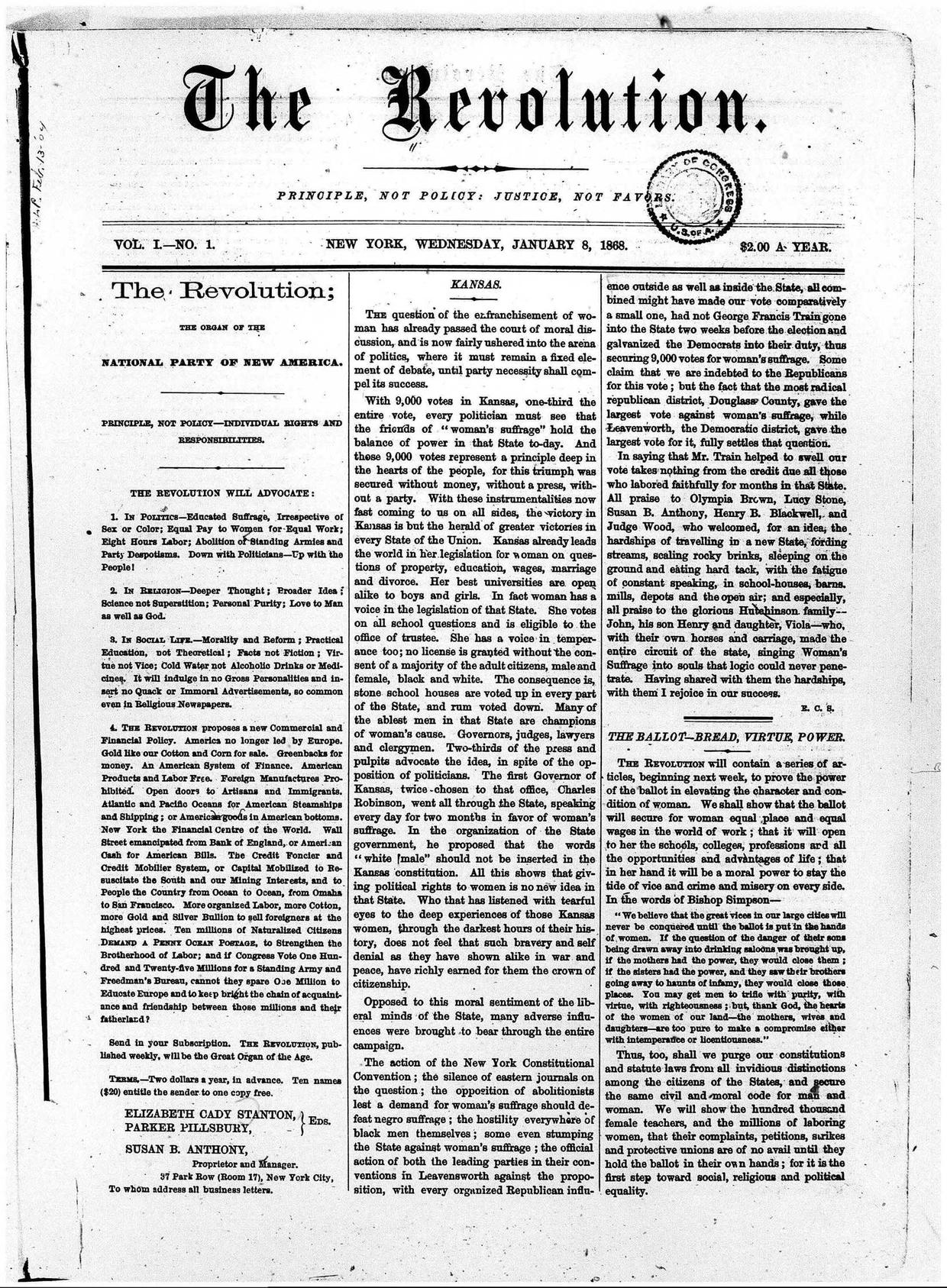
First issue of The Revolution, January 8, 1868.

The Revolution focused primarily on women's rights, especially suffrage, but it also dealt with other topics. The paper reported on advancements made by women, cases of discrimination against women in employment, and improvements in divorce laws. It followed activities of the women's movement, including speeches, meeting announcements, convention proceedings and testimony before government bodies. It reported on organizing efforts by women workers and the activities of other sections of the labor movement that were seen as potential allies. Foreign correspondents reported from England, continental Europe and India. Train contributed his views on a variety of topics, including Irish independence and currency reform. His associate, David Melliss, the financial editor of the New York World, handled the paper's financial department. A typical issue carried one or two pages of advertisements.

The newspaper strove for a lively tone. Its correspondents were asked not to sentimentalize but to "Give us facts and experience, in words, if you please, as hard as cannon-balls." The paper sparred vigorously with its opponents. When the New York World criticized the women's movement, Elizabeth Cady Stanton, an editor, responded, "The World innocently asks us the question, why, like the Englishwomen, we do not sit still in our conventions, and get "first class men" to do the speaking? We might, with equal propriety, ask the World's editorial staff why they do not lay down their pens and get first class men to edit their journal?"

The Revolution's correspondents were not expected to present a single point of view. On the contrary, the newspaper declared, "those who write for our columns are responsible only for what appears under their own names. Hence if old Abolitionists and Slaveholders, Republicans and Democrats, Presbyterians and Universalists, Saints, Sinners and the Beecher family find themselves side by side in writing up the question of Woman Suffrage, they must pardon each other's differences on all other points". An important function of the paper was to provide a forum in which its readers, most of whom were women, could exchange opinions. Its readers responded with a steady stream of commentary from a variety of viewpoints. Sometimes those readers identified themselves fully, but many signed themselves with as little as a single initial, leaving their identities still unknown.

The writers of the newspaper found inspiration in John Stuart Mill's The Subjection of Women, which had been published in 1869. Following years of British reformers' criticism on the topic, Mill wrote that marriage was an institution of despotism and ushered the discussion into a more mainstream domain. Stanton looked up to Mill and used his ideas as a guide for her own.

By 1869, Stanton was alone in writing the newspaper. She enthusiastically turned to the themes of sexuality and marriage, seizing the opportunity to use a local New York scandal as a caustic platform. The scandal was the trial of Daniel McFarland, a man who was convicted of murdering his ex-wife Abigail's fiancé, Albert Richardson, who had been a popular writer for Horace Greeley's Tribune. In writing about the trial, Stanton was determined to break through the "hypocrisy that prevented frank discussion of marriage by bringing the steamy facts of desire, jealousy, and extramarital sex uncomfortably close in a way that oblique discussions about coverture could not." The judge would not recognize Abigail's divorce and therefore prevented her from testifying against her husband, who was eventually acquitted on grounds of insanity. After the verdict, Stanton appealed for change—namely, for divorce laws to be altered and improved.

==== Campaigns and issues ====
The Revolution supported a number of causes that challenged tradition. It criticized the long and heavy dresses that women were expected to wear at all times and the practice of women promising to "obey" as part of marriage ceremonies. It reported cases of women attempting to vote in defiance of laws that prohibited them from doing so. It referred to practices that society did not want to discuss openly, such as husbands beating and forcing themselves sexually on their wives. Voicing an opinion that was highly controversial at that time, it advocated divorce as a legitimate option for women in abusive marriages. Rejecting the notion that each woman should be under the control of a man, it called for women to be in control of both their own bodies and their destinies. Its aggressive advocacy of such controversial opinions drew the attention of the mainstream press, much of it hostile. That was acceptable to Stanton, who believed that it was better for the women's movement to be attacked than to be ignored.

During 1868, the paper conducted an energetic campaign in support of Hester Vaughn, a domestic worker whose former employer had impregnated her. Destitute and seriously ill, she gave birth alone in an unheated room where the baby died. Vaughn was accused of deliberately allowing the baby to die and sentenced to be executed. After publicizing the case in The Revolution, Stanton visited the governor to ask him to pardon Vaughn, which he eventually did.

The Revolution applauded the growth of the National Labor Union (NLU), which existed from 1866 to 1873, hoping to join with it in a broad alliance that would create a new political party, one that would support women's suffrage as well as the demands of working people. The Revolution declared, "The principles of the National Labor Union are our principles." It predicted that, "The producers—the working-men, the women, the negroes—are destined to form a triple power that shall speedily wrest the sceptre of government from the non-producers—the land monopolists, the bond-holders, the politicians." Although the NLU responded warmly to The Revolution's overtures, the anticipated alliance did not develop.

==== Woman's Suffrage Association of America ====
In May 1868, The Revolution announced the formation of the Woman's Suffrage Association of America to serve as a coordinating committee for the local women's suffrage organizations that had developed around the country. Its officers included Stanton and Anthony, and it shared The Revolution's office. Stanton later said, "The Revolution, holding the ground of universal suffrage irrespective of color or sex, is specially the organ of the Woman's Suffrage Association of America." The new organization published a petition in The Revolution in favor of women's suffrage and asked its readers to circulate it. The coordinating committee was soon replaced, however, by a broader women's suffrage organization.

==== Deepening divide in the women's movement ====
Many social reformers were deeply dismayed at The Revolution's refusal to support the proposed Fifteenth Amendment, which would enfranchise black men, unless it was accompanied by another amendment that would also enfranchise women. Stanton, who came from a socially prominent family, opposed it in The Revolution with language that was sometimes elitist and racially condescending. Stanton wrote, "American women of wealth, education, virtue and refinement, if you do not wish the lower orders of Chinese, Africans, Germans and Irish, with their low ideas of womanhood to make laws for you and your daughters ... demand that women too shall be represented in government." Stanton also periodically appealed to racism and ethnocentrism in order to distinguish female suffrage from black male suffrage: “ 'Patrick and Sambo and Hans and Yung Tung, who do not know the difference between a monarchy and a republic,' declared Stanton, had no right to be “making laws for [feminist leader] Lucretia Mott.”

The deepening divide within the women's movement reached a breaking point with the acrimonious disputes at the American Equal Rights Association meeting in May 1869, which led to the demise of that organization. Two days after that meeting, the split began to be formalized when the two founders of The Revolution hosted a gathering at which the National Woman Suffrage Association was formed, led by the same two people, Elizabeth Cady Stanton and Susan B. Anthony. In November 1869 the competing American Woman Suffrage Association (AWSA) was formed, with Lucy Stone in the lead. In January 1870 Stone launched a rival newspaper called the Woman's Journal. Both the AWSA and the Woman's Journal supported the Fifteenth Amendment. Despite conjecture at the time, there is little evidence that The Revolution suffered significantly from competition with the Woman's Journal. Few subscribers switched allegiance, many subscribed to both journals and subscriptions to The Revolution continued to increase.

==== Financial problems ====
Train's promise of on-going support did not materialize. He sailed for England the same day that The Revolution published its first issue and shortly afterwards was jailed for supporting Irish independence. Train provided a total of only $3000 for the paper, although his business associate David Melliss provided another $7000. On May 8, 1869, The Revolution announced that its relationship with Train had officially ended.

Personnel expenses were necessarily kept to a minimum. Pillsbury, a professional editor who had worked at other newspapers, was paid a small salary. Stanton received no salary at all, and Anthony received only expenses.

The paper cost about $20,000 per year to operate. The number of subscribers, who paid $2 per year, reached 2000 at the end of the first year and 3000 at the end of the second. Getting new subscriptions was made more difficult by laws that gave husbands control over their families' finances: few husbands liked the idea of their wives reading a journal that called for a revolution in gender relations. Advertising brought in additional revenue but not enough to sustain the paper, forcing Anthony to borrow substantial amounts of money.

Attempts were made to bring Harriet Beecher Stowe (author of Uncle Tom's Cabin) and her sister Isabella Beecher Hooker onto the editorial staff, which would have broadened the paper's appeal. Both had already published articles in the paper. Negotiations foundered, however, first over the name of the paper, which the two sisters wanted to change to The True Republic, and then over the paper's coverage of a prominent social scandal in which Stanton took the unpopular stance of supporting the woman involved. Stanton defended the newspaper's name, saying, "There could not be a better name than Revolution. The establishing of woman on her rightful throne is the greatest revolution the world has ever known or ever will know."

Twenty-nine months after the paper's first issue, Anthony conceded defeat and transferred the paper to other hands. She took personal responsibility for the newspaper's $10,000 debt, which she paid off with the proceeds of her next six years on the lecture circuit. The NWSA afterwards depended on other periodicals, such as The National Citizen and Ballot Box, edited by Matilda Joslyn Gage, and The Woman's Tribune, edited by Clara Bewick Colby, to represent its viewpoint.

=== Bullard editorship ===
Anthony sold The Revolution for one dollar on May 26, 1870, to Laura Curtis Bullard, who became its new editor, with Edwin A. Studwell as publisher. Both were strong supporters of women's suffrage. Bullard had been elected as one of the National Women's Suffrage Association's corresponding secretaries at its founding meeting, and she had already published articles in The Revolution. She came from a family that had become wealthy by selling patent medicines. Studwell was a Quaker abolitionist and financier.

Bullard gave the paper a new motto, the Biblical phrase: "What therefore God hath joined together, let not man put asunder", which was often quoted in marriage ceremonies. One historian has conjectured that Bullard selected the motto partly to fend off accusations that the women's rights movement would destroy the institution of marriage. She gave it her own interpretation, however, saying "it is a time-honored form of words expressing not only one limited idea but many other noble meanings." Woman, she continued, "has been systematically divorced from [man] from the beginning of time: she is now to proclaim and enforce her marriage rights. She is to have an equal place with him in the trades, in the colleges, in the lyceum, in the press, in literature, in science, in art, in government, in everything."

Bullard's editorial style was much less confrontational than Stanton's, and she oriented the paper more towards literature and poetry, leading Anthony's authorized biographer to say that Bullard turned the paper into a "literary and society journal". In its own way, however, it continued to deal with a wide range of women's rights issues despite those who wanted the movement to focus narrowly on suffrage. In response to direct criticism, Bullard wrote, "the Woman's Journal, in attempting to reduce the woman's movement to the square-inch of the ballot, writes itself down in 1870 as more conservative than the originators of the movement were in 1848." Stanton wrote occasional articles for the paper, as did several other women who had contributed during Stanton's editorship.

Bullard asked Anthony to return to the paper to manage its affairs, but Anthony declined. Bullard attempted to increase revenue by selling more advertisements, including those for patent medicines, many of them produced by her family's business. Stanton and Anthony had refused to carry advertisements for patent medicines because they saw them as hazardous to health.

Bullard traveled to Europe in December 1870 with her elderly parents but continued to edit The Revolution from abroad. After sixteen months as editor she resigned in October 1871, citing the difficulty of editing the paper in that fashion.

=== Clark editorship ===
On October 28, 1871, the newspaper was transferred to a new editor, Rev. W. T. Clarke, and publisher, J. N. Hallock. Its motto became: "Devoted to the Interest of Woman and Home Culture". Clarke supported women's suffrage, but his approach toward other women's issues often differed from previous editors. In his first issue Clarke said, "Most men are exceedingly kind to women, and treat them with too much tenderness rather than too little. More women among us are injured by indulgence rather than injustice." With its flamboyantly revolutionary name but far-from-revolutionary content, The Revolution lasted only four months under Clarke's editorship, publishing its last issue on February 17, 1872. Its subscription list was merged with Hallock's other newspaper, the Liberal Christian.

== Significance ==
The Revolution confirmed the status of Stanton and Anthony as prominent public figures whose outspoken and often controversial statements helped to thrust the topic of women's rights forcefully into the national conversation. It provided them with a means for expressing their views within the women's rights movement at a time of sharp disagreement about its direction. It strengthened their wing of the movement and helped to prepare the way for an organization, the National Woman Suffrage Association, to represent it.

== See also ==
- List of suffragists and suffragettes
- List of women's rights activists
- Timeline of women's suffrage
- Women's suffrage publications
