= Theodore Tilton =

American newspaper editor, poet, and abolitionist (1835–1907)

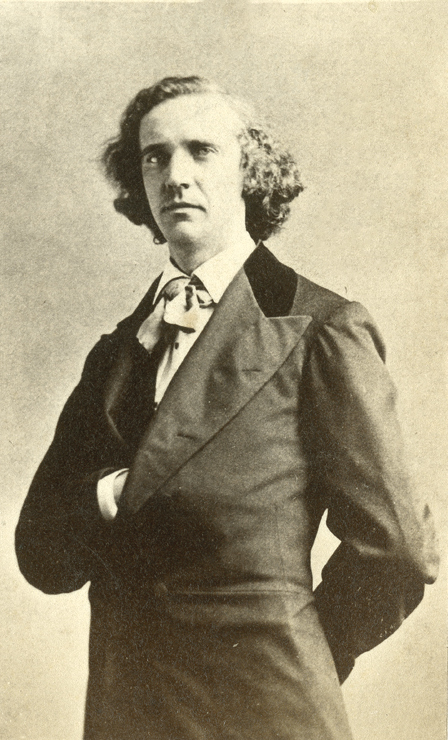
Tilton circa 1870

Theodore Tilton (October 2, 1835 – May 29, 1907) was an American newspaper editor, poet and abolitionist. He was born in New York City to Silas Tilton and Eusebia Tilton (same surname). On his twentieth birthday, October 2, 1855, he married Elizabeth Richards. Tilton's newspaper work was fully supportive of abolitionism and the Northern cause in the American Civil War.

Theodore Tilton was present at The Southern Loyalist Convention held in Philadelphia in September 1866. Frederick Douglass writes of him in his autobiography:

There was one man present who was broad enough to take in the whole situation, and brave enough to meet the duty of the hour; one who was neither afraid nor ashamed to own me as a man and a brother; one man of the purest Caucasian type, a poet and a scholar, brilliant as a writer, eloquent as a speaker, and holding a high and influential position—the editor of a weekly journal having the largest circulation of any weekly paper in the city or State of New York—and that man was Mr. Theodore Tilton. He came to me in my isolation, seized me by the hand in a most brotherly way, and proposed to walk with me in the procession.

From 1860 to 1863, Tilton was the assistant of Henry Ward Beecher at the New York periodical The Independent, owned by Henry Chandler Bowen. He succeeded Beecher as editor-in-chief until he was forced to resign in 1870. In 1869 he gave the commencement speech for the Irving Literary Society.

In 1874 Tilton filed a complaint against Beecher for "criminal conversation" (adultery) with Elizabeth Richards Tilton and sued for a $100,000 (~$2.49 million in 2024) judgment.

The Beecher-Tilton trial ended in a deadlocked jury. Afterwards, Tilton moved to Paris, where he lived for the rest of his life. In the 1880s, Tilton frequently played chess with a fellow American exile, ex-Confederate Secretary of State Judah Benjamin, until the latter died in 1884.

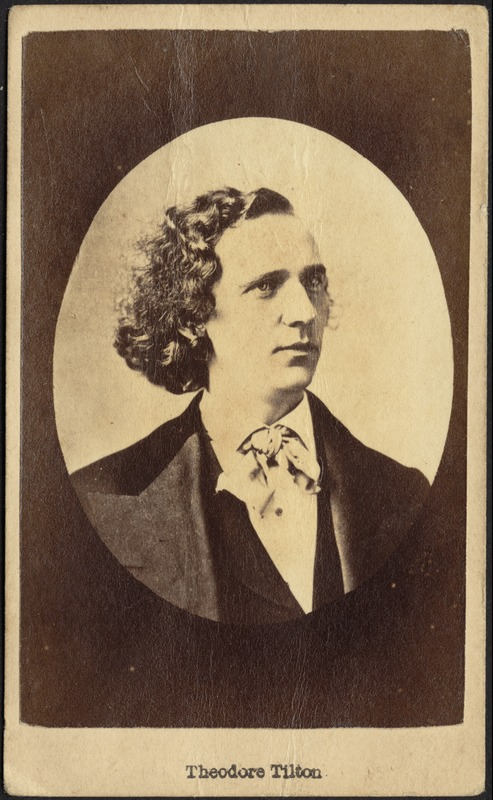
Theodore Tilton, [ca. 1859–1870]. Carte de Visite Collection, Boston Public Library.

As a poet, Tilton is famous for his 1858 poem "The King's Ring", with its famous line, "Even this shall pass away", which is the last line of each of its seven stanzas.

== Work referenced ==
Robert Plant put Tilton's poem "The King's Ring" to music, a recording of which is on Band of Joy.

== Principal works ==
- Victoria C. Woodhull. A Biographical Sketch. 1871
- Tempest-Tossed A Romance. 1874.
- The Complete Poetical Works of Theodore Tilton in One Volume With a Preface on Ballad-Making and an Appendix on Old Norse Myths & Fables. 1897.
