= Timeline of women's suffrage in Ohio =

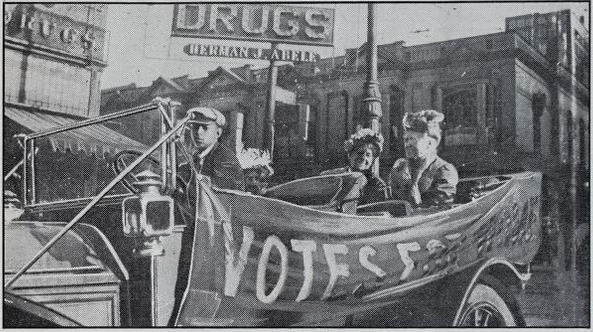
Mrs. Kline and Mrs. Sara Bissell of Toledo, Ohio campaign for women's suffrage in 1912

This is a timeline of women's suffrage in Ohio. Women's suffrage activism in Ohio began in earnest around the 1850s, when several women's rights conventions took place around the state. The Ohio Women's Convention was very influential on the topic of women's suffrage, and the second Ohio Women's Convention in Akron, Ohio, featured Sojourner Truth and her famous speech, Ain't I a Woman? Women worked to create organizations and groups to influence politicians on women's suffrage. Several state constitutional amendments for women's suffrage did not pass. However, women in Ohio did get the right to vote in school board elections and in some municipalities before Ohio became the fifth state to ratify the Nineteenth Amendment.

== 19th century ==
=== 1800s ===
1802

- November: The Ohio Constitutional Convention votes to provide suffrage in the state to only white men. Ohio becomes the second state to restrict voting by race in their constitution.

=== 1850s ===
1850

- April: The first convention of women's rights held outside of New York took place. The Ohio Women's Convention had an attendance of 500 people.
- May 6: A state Constitutional Convention is convened in Columbus. A proposal to remove both "white" and "male" from the legal description of a voter in the constitution fails by a large margin.

1851

- The Ohio Women's Convention in Akron, Ohio had Sojourner Truth as a speaker on African-American women and equality.

1852

- The Ohio Women's Convention in Massillon, Ohio established the Ohio Women's Rights Association (OWRA).

1853

- October 5: The National Women's Rights Convention is held in Cleveland.
- May 25: First meeting of the Ohio Women's Rights Association (OWRA) takes place in Ravenna, Ohio.

1854

- Caroline Severance, president of the Ohio Women's Rights Association (OWRA) reads a petition for women's rights to the Ohio Senate.

1855

- October 18: The National Women's Rights Convention is held in Cincinnati.

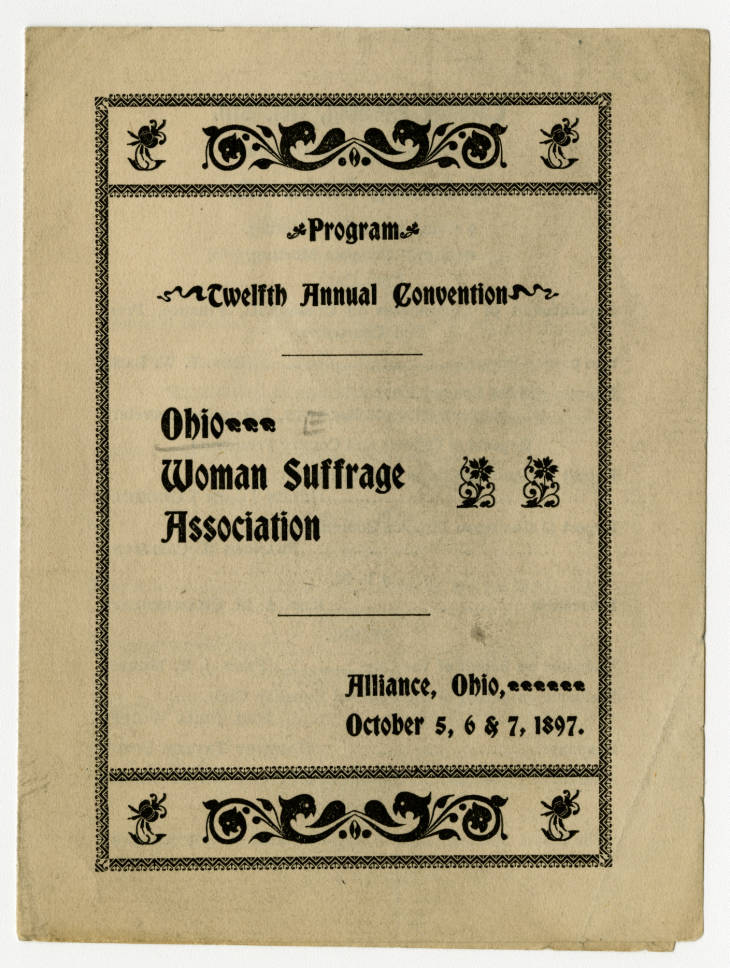
12th annual convention of the Ohio Woman Suffrage Association 1897

=== 1860s ===
1867

- Susan B. Anthony, Elizabeth Cady Stanton, Lucy Stone and George Francis Train campaign for women's suffrage in Ohio, starting in Cleveland.

1869

- The American Woman Suffrage Association (AWSA) is established in Cleveland.
- November 24–25: AWSA holds its first convention in Cleveland.
- The Toledo Women's Suffrage Association (TWSA) is created.
- The Dayton Woman's Suffrage Association (DWSA) is formed.

=== 1870s ===
1871

- DWSA disbands.

1873

- A women's suffrage petition is presented at the Ohio Constitutional Convention. Proposals for women's suffrage fail at the convention.

1874

- The Women's Christian Temperance Union (WCTU) is founded in Cleveland.

1876

- The Toledo Woman Suffrage Association (TWSA) refuses to participate in a Fourth of July celebration saying, "We feel it inconsistent as a disfranchised class to unite with you in the celebration of that liberty which is the heritage of but half the people."

=== 1880s ===
1880

- Susan B. Anthony attends the Democratic National Convention in Cincinnati.

1884

- A small suffrage convention takes place in Columbus.

1885

- The Ohio Woman Suffrage Association (OWSA) is founded in Painesville, Ohio.

1888

- Louisa Southworth of Cleveland starts enrolling the names of people from Ohio endorsing women's suffrage in order to counter the narrative that women don't want to vote.
- Two referendum for full and municipal women's suffrage were introduced in the Ohio Legislature, but both fail.

1889

- Another bill for full suffrage is introduced in the Ohio Senate, but does not make a required three-fifths majority to pass.

=== 1890s ===
1891

- Suffragists petition the Ohio Legislature, but no bills for women's suffrage are introduced.

1892

- A bill for women's suffrage in school board elections is introduced in the Ohio House by E. W. Doty. It does not pass.

1893

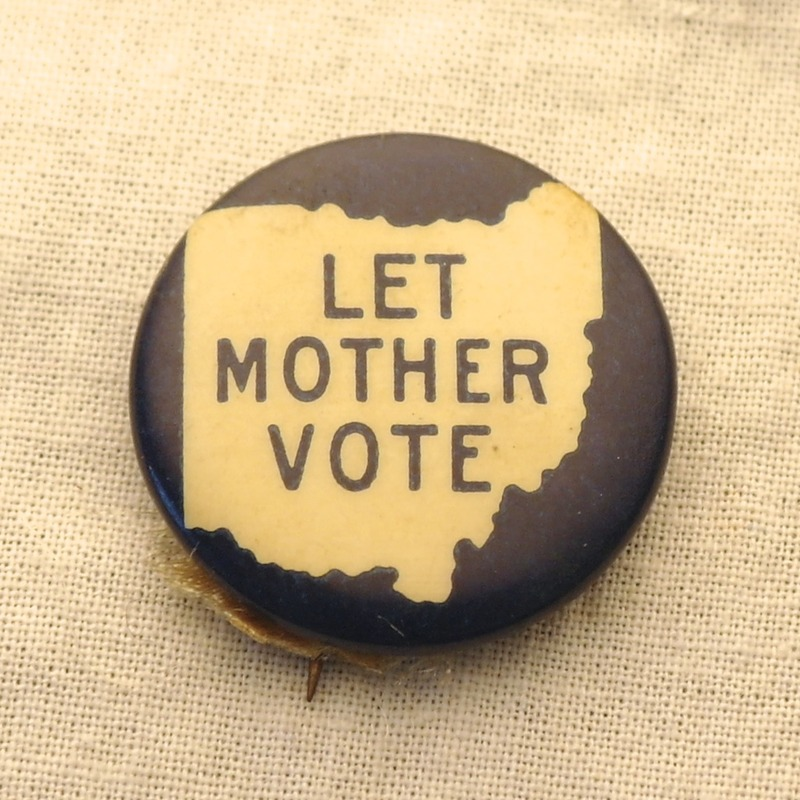
Let mother vote pin Ohio 1911

- Another bill for school board suffrage is introduced, but does not pass.

1894

- January: Gustavus A. Wood introduces another school board suffrage bill in the House, but it is narrowly defeated.
- April 10: A similar school board suffrage bill is introduced in the Ohio Senate by William T. Clark and it passes by a large measure.
- April 24: The Senate bill is turned over to the House where it passes.
- Law passed in Ohio to allow women to vote in school board elections and also to run for office in the school board.
- December: Ida M. Earnhart in Columbus is one of the first women to register to vote in the next school election.

1895

- January: A suit is filed against Earnhart and the board of elections to strike her name from the list of voters. It is argued in the Franklin County Circuit Court in January.
- February 1: The Franklin County Circuit Court declares that the law allowing women to vote in school board elections is constitutional.
- Women vote in their first school board elections.

1896

- Henrietta G. Moore of Springfield, Ohio and Laura A. Gregg from Kansas travel Ohio on behalf of OWSA to help set up additional local groups.

1897

- A suffrage conference is held in the Fall in Toledo.

1898

- February 10: An amendment introduced by A. J. Hazlett in the Ohio House to repeal school board suffrage is defeated by 76 against and 22 for.
- April: The National Woman Suffrage Conference is held in Cincinnati.
- May: The fifth annual Ohio Women Suffrage Convention takes place in Akron. Speakers include Susan B. Anthony, Anna Howard Shaw and Zerelda G. Wallace.

1899

- Harriet Taylor Upton becomes president of OWSA.

== 20th century ==
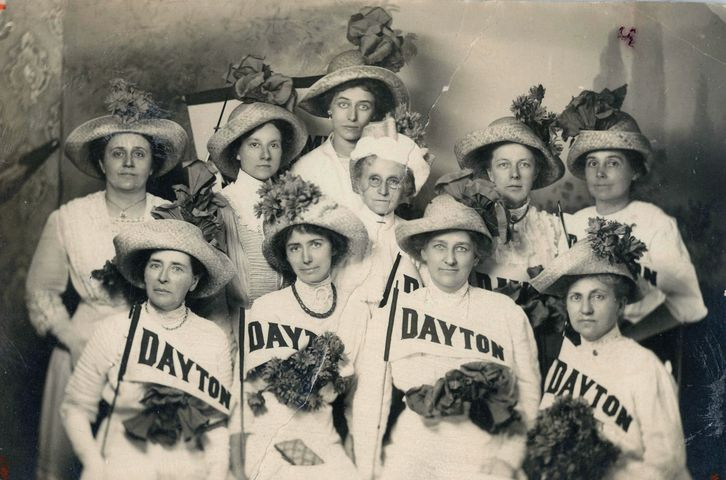
Women from Woman's Suffrage Association of Montgomery County and Dayton in 1912.

=== 1900s ===
1900

- Harriet Taylor Upton visits "fifteen principal towns" in Ohio to help set up organized suffrage groups. By the end of the year, she had doubled organized suffrage participation.
- January: The Ohio Legislature considers an equal suffrage bill.

1903

- The National American Woman Suffrage Association (NAWSA) headquarters is moved to Warren, Ohio.

=== 1910s ===
1910

- NAWSA headquarters is moved from Warren.

1911

- June: Elizabeth Hauser organizes a suffrage rally at Cedar Point. Speakers include Harriet Taylor Upton and Newton D. Baker.
- October: The Ohio Women's Suffrage Association (OWSA) holds their annual convention in Dayton with Anna Howard Shaw as a featured speaker.

1912

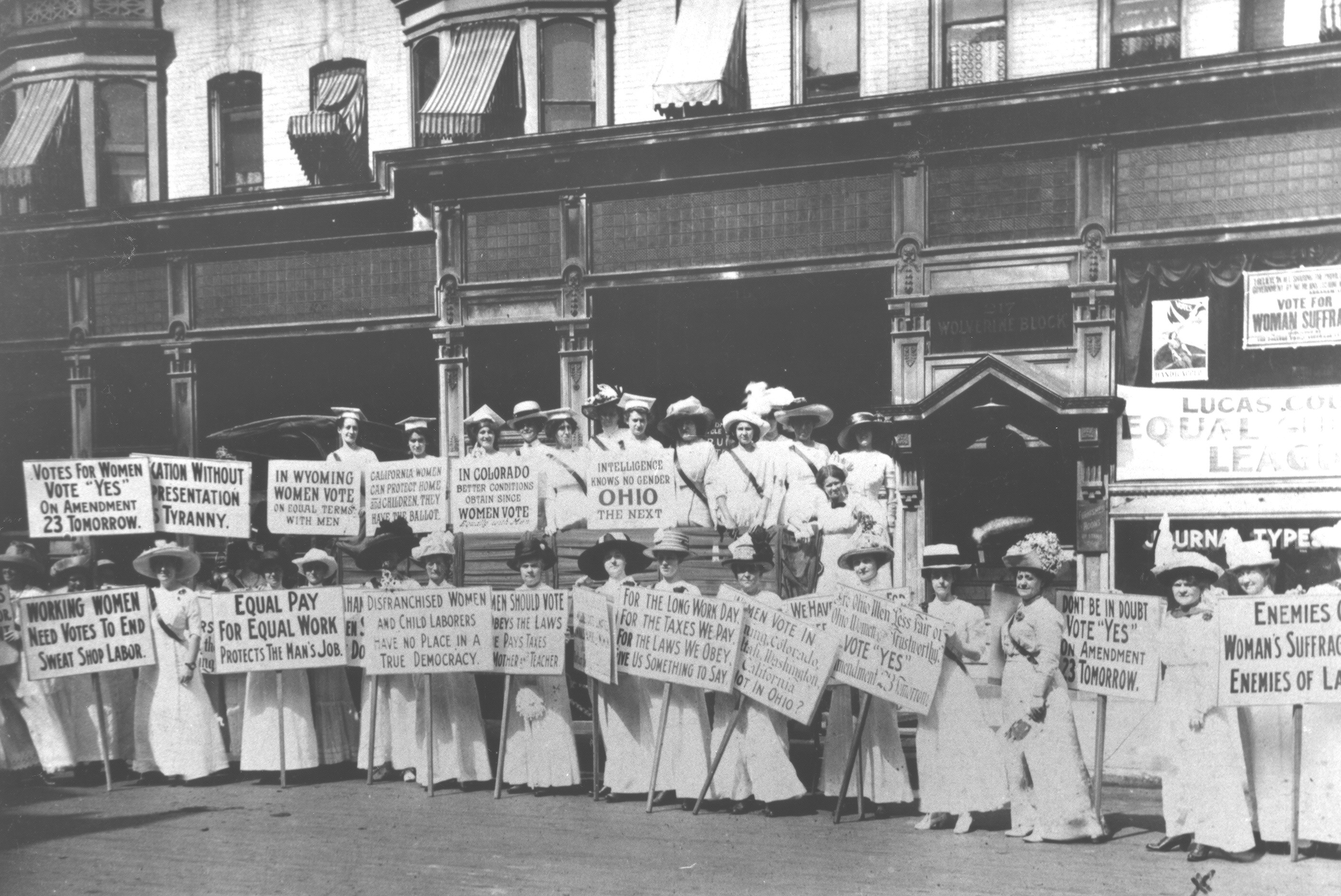
Toledo Woman Suffrage Association, 1912

- January 18: Dora Bachman of Cincinnati presents a women's suffrage amendment proposal to the Ohio Constitutional Convention's committee.
- A women's suffrage voter referendum for an amendment to the Ohio Constitution is on the ballot.
- August 27: OWSA organizes a suffrage parade in Columbus. Around 5,000 women attend the parade.
- September 3: The 1912 Ohio suffrage amendment does not pass.
- A law is passed in Ohio allowing individual municipalities to choose if they wished to grant women's suffrage within their city.
- An umbrella group, the Franklin County Women's Suffrage Association (FCWSA) is formed.
- The Woman's Suffrage Party of Montgomery County is formed.
- The Lima Federation of Women's Clubs invites Emmeline Pankhurst to speak in Lima, Ohio.
- Cornelia Cassady Davis wins the prize for "best suffrage poster" from OWSA for her "Let Ohio Women Vote" image.
- The Shelby Equal Franchise Association is formed in Shelby, Ohio and was part of the local WCTU.

1914

- January: The Socialist Party and Progressive Party in Ohio came out in support of women's suffrage.
- May 9: Preachers who were members of the Ministerial Association of Columbus preached on Mother's Day how giving women the vote would help them "better fulfill their maternal duties."
- October: Carrie Chapman Catt and Harriet Taylor Upton came to speak in Lima, Ohio. A parade was held that drew more than 1,500 people in support of women's suffrage.
- October: Suffragists in Cleveland held a parade that drew more than 10,000 women and 400 men marching and riding on horseback.
- November 3: The 2nd Ohio women's suffrage amendment is rejected.

1915

- The Ohio Woman Suffrage Association (OWSA) invites NAWSA and the Congressional Union (CU) to set up offices in Ohio.

1916

- June 6: The Municipal Suffrage Amendment in East Cleveland passes with 426 votes, allowing women to vote in city elections.

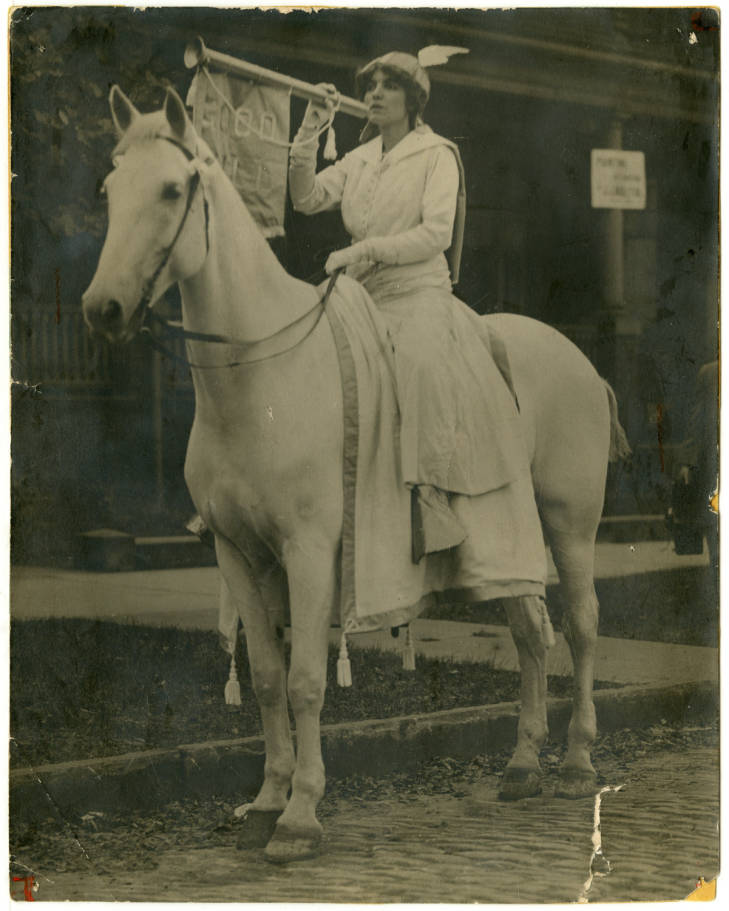
Suffragist from Ohio on Horseback 1914.

1917

- February: Representative from Cuyahoga County, James A. Reynolds introduces a bill into the Ohio legislature for women to vote in presidential elections.
- February 21: Governor James M. Cox signs the "Reynolds Bill," granting women the right to vote in presidential elections.
- Lakewood, Ohio passes municipal suffrage measures for women.
- Challenges to municipal suffrage are rejected by the Ohio Supreme Court.
- November 6: A voter referendum rejects the "Reynolds Bill."

1919

- June 16: Ohio ratifies the Nineteenth Amendment. It is the fifth state to ratify the amendment.
- The Colored Women's Republican Club changes their name to the Colored Women's Independent Political League.

=== 1920s ===
1920

- April 23: Hawke v. the Secretary of the State of Ohio decides that a federal amendment to the U.S. Constitution does not have to be decided by direct voter referendum, which ended a problem Tennessee had with ratifying the 19th Amendment.
- April: The Cuyahoga County Woman's Suffrage Party dissolves and reforms as the League of Women Voters of Cleveland.
- September: The Political Equality Club of Lima dissolves and creates the Lima League of Women Voters.

1923

- A voter referendum passes to remove the phrase "white male" from the description of a voter in the Ohio Constitution.

== See also ==
- List of Ohio suffragists
- Women's suffrage in Ohio
- Women's suffrage in states of the United States
- Women's suffrage in the United States
