= Women's suffrage in Ohio =

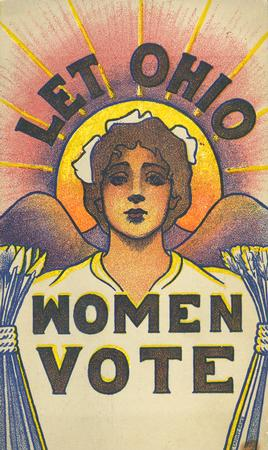
Let Ohio Women Vote postcard

Women's rights issues in Ohio were put into the public eye in the early 1850s. Women inspired by the Declaration of Rights and Sentiments at the 1848 Seneca Falls Convention created newspapers and then set up their own conventions, including the 1850 Ohio Women's Rights Convention which was the first women's right's convention outside of New York and the first that was planned and run solely by women. These early efforts towards women's suffrage affected people in other states and helped energize the women's suffrage movement in Ohio. Women's rights groups formed throughout the state, with the Ohio Women's Rights Association (OWRA) founded in 1853. Other local women's suffrage groups are formed in the late 1860s. In 1894, women won the right to vote in school board elections in Ohio. The National American Woman Suffrage Association (NAWSA) was headquartered for a time in Warren, Ohio. Two efforts to vote on a constitutional amendment, one in 1912 and the other 1914 were unsuccessful, but drew national attention to women's suffrage. In 1916, women in East Cleveland gained the right to vote in municipal elections. A year later, women in Lakewood, Ohio and Columbus were given the right to vote in municipal elections. Also in 1917, the Reynolds Bill, which would allow women to vote in the next presidential election was passed, and then quickly repealed by a voter referendum sponsored by special-interest groups. On June 16, 1919, Ohio became the fifth state to ratify the Nineteenth Amendment.

== Early efforts ==
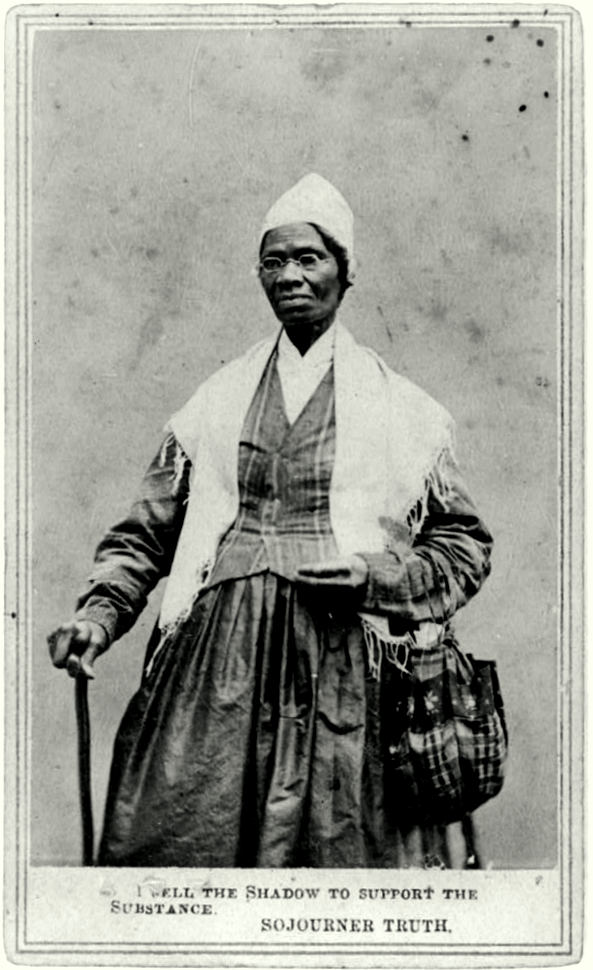
Sojourner Truth postcard

The Declaration of Rights and Sentiments created at the 1848 Seneca Falls Convention inspired many women in Ohio to work towards women's rights. Elizabeth Bisbee of Columbus decided to create a women's suffrage newspaper, the Alliance after reading the Declaration. Heading into the early 1850s, there began to be considerable support for women's suffrage in Ohio.

The first Ohio Women's Rights Convention took place in Salem, Ohio in April 1850. President of the convention was Betsy Mix Cowles. This convention, attended by around 500 people, was the first women's right's convention held outside of New York. It was also the first convention completely organized and run by women. Only women were allowed to speak or vote during the convention. Women said of the men attending the convention, "They then learned for the first time in the world's history how it felt to sit in silence when questions in which they were interested were being discussed." Women at this convention published Address to the Women of Ohio. The effects of the convention were later felt as far west as Wyoming, where John Allen Campbell in 1869 signed the first bill granting equal women's suffrage in the United States. Campbell had attended the Salem conference as a young man.

In 1851, a second Ohio Women's Rights Convention took place in Akron, Ohio with Frances Gage as president. Sojourner Truth was one of the speakers at the Akron convention, presenting a speech, "Ain't I A Woman?". Truth's words had a profound effect on the audience. One of the women who was inspired by Truth was Cleveland suffragist, Caroline Severance.

At these conferences and at other women's rights meetings, Gage collected signatures to influence delegates to the 1850 Ohio Constitutional Convention to include women's suffrage. Many people also submitted petitions to the convention to allow voting "regardless of color or sex." Thousands of signatures were collected and the debates at the Constitutional Convention were so heated, that the exact words were not kept in the official records of the proceedings. The delegates to the convention decided to only extend voting rights to white men and by a large majority voted against both women's suffrage and suffrage for African-American people. Only delegates from the Western Reserve area of Ohio favored giving the vote to African-Americans in the state.

On May 27, 1852, a third Women's Rights Convention was held in Massillon, Ohio. The convention drew women from all over Ohio and from different social classes. Attendees of the convention decided to create the Ohio Woman's Rights Association (OWRA). OWRA met for the first time in Ravenna on May 25, 1853 with members from around the state. The group extended membership to any interested person and the first president was Severance. The group immediately began working on a petition to present to the Ohio Legislature requesting women's suffrage. On April 1, 1854, Severance brought the petition to the Ohio Senate.

Cleveland held the fourth National Women's Rights Convention on October 6, 1853. Well-known suffragists such as Susan B. Anthony, Amelia Bloomer, Antoinette Brown, Lucretia Mott and Lucy Stone all came to participate in the convention that drew women from around the country. At the convention, women discussed various women's rights. One of the rights they outlined was "That women be exempted from taxation until their right of suffrage is practically acknowledged." In 1855 on October 17 the sixth National Women's Rights Convention was held in Cincinnati.

A national suffrage organization, the American Woman Suffrage Association (AWSA) was established in Cleveland in 1869 on November 24 and 25 at a convention held at Case Hall. AWSA was meant to be a "less radical" group compared to the National Woman Suffrage Association (NWSA). Early on, Toledo and Dayton also created women's suffrage organizations. The Toledo Woman's Suffrage Association (TWSA) and the Dayton Woman's Suffrage Association were both formed around 1869.

Some women in South Newbury, Ohio voted in elections between 1871 and 1876, though the women's votes were never counted. In 1873, women brought a petition for women's suffrage to another Ohio constitutional convention. The petitions had almost 8,000 signatures and represented thirty-three Ohio counties. At the convention, delegates formed a women's suffrage committee to report on the issue and submitted an equal suffrage proposal to the convention. The proposal was debated for two days and some delegates used "the Bible to prove that man's position was and should be superior to that of woman." Others argued that women's suffrage would help women be better wives, mothers and Christians. The proposal never came before the electors of the convention and failed by 4 votes.

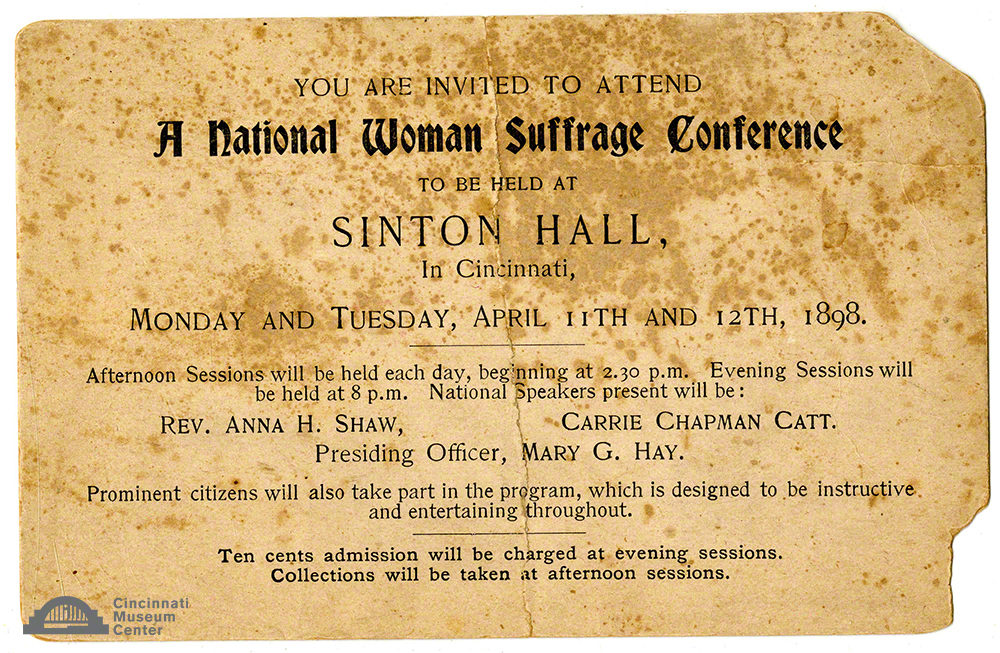
Invitation to 1898 National Woman Suffrage Conference in Cincinnati

In May 1885, the Ohio Woman Suffrage Association (OWSA) was founded in Painesville. OWSA focused on changing local and state laws to provide suffrage to women.

After the creation of the WCTU, there was an influence on women's suffrage around the state. In Shelby, a small town with a disproportionate number of saloons, women became involved in political organizing over prohibition and creating alternative places for men to visit, such as reading rooms. The Shelby Equal Franchise Association was also created as an offshoot of the WCTU.

To counter the idea that women did not really want to vote, Louise Southworth in Cleveland became the national superintendent of enrollment. Starting in 1888, she created a list of people in Ohio who endorsed women's suffrage.

Women gained the right to vote in school board elections in 1894 but the right did not extend to allowing women to vote on bonds involving school infrastructure. The National Woman Suffrage Conference was held in Cincinnati in April 1898.

In 1899, Harriet Taylor Upton was elected president of OWSA. Upton also served as the treasurer for the National American Woman Suffrage Association (NAWSA) from 1894 to 1910. Starting in the Spring of 1900, Upton visited fifteen important Ohio towns and helped organize local suffrage efforts there. By the end of 1900, she had doubled participation in organized suffrage efforts.

In 1900, the Ohio General Assembly considered a suffrage bill in January. The Dayton Herald pointed out that it was significant that the Ohio Federation of Women's Clubs (OFWC) had not yet endorsed women's suffrage.

In 1903, NAWSA moved their national headquarters to Warren, Ohio. NAWSA used Upton's house as a temporary center before moving to the Trumbull County Courthouse in 1905.

== School board suffrage ==
In the Ohio House of Representatives, E. W. Doty introduced a bill for both women's suffrage on school board elections and to allow them to serve on these boards. Doty's bill lost by seven votes and he brought it forward again in the House in 1893, where it lost by six votes. In January 1894, Representative Gustavus A. Wood introduced another bill, that was again narrowly defeated. Caroline McCullough Everhard, who helped form the Equal Rights Association of Massillon and Canton, was a wealthy woman who was taxed, but unable to vote. In 1894, Everhard and Governor William McKinley worked together to lobby Ohio lawmakers on the issue of women voting in school board elections. Everhard convinced Senator William T. Clark to bring up a school board suffrage bill in the Ohio Senate. The Senate bill, which also would provide the right for women to run for the school board, passed on April 10 in the Senate and the House on April 24.

In 1895, women voted for the first time in school board elections. Everhard also worked to promote Elizabeth Folger in her successful run for the school board in Massillon, Ohio in 1895. In Xenia, Ohio, Mary Moore and Eliza Carruthers also won positions on their local school boards.

== State amendments ==
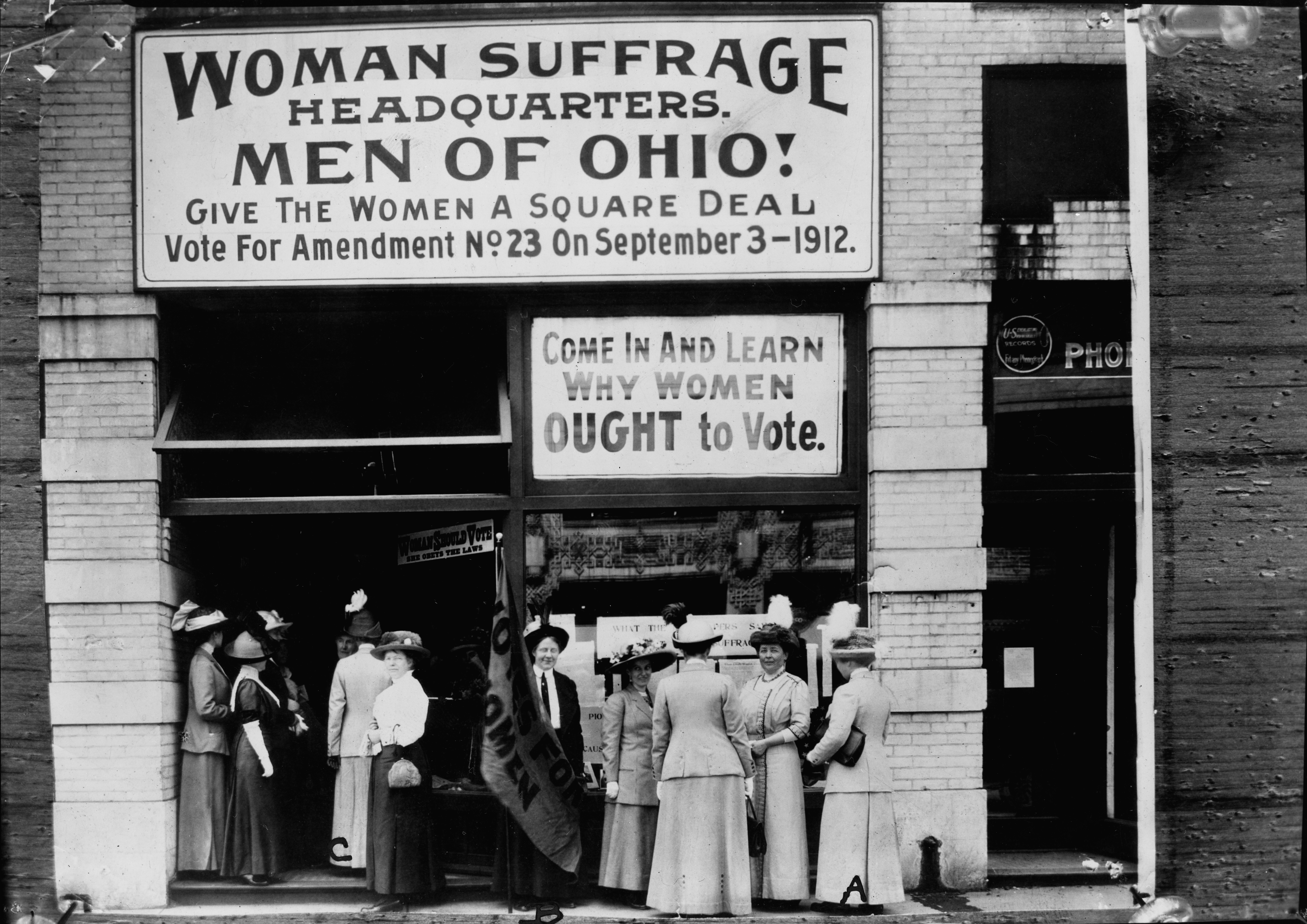
1912 Ohio Woman Suffrage Association Headquarters in Cleveland

When California gave women the right to vote in 1911, many women in Ohio were equally encouraged in their work on women's suffrage. In 1911, Elizabeth Hauser of Cleveland questioned each of the six candidates running for mayor on whether they supported women's suffrage and only one publicly did not. Florence E. Allen traveled to 66 counties in Ohio in 1911 speaking to farmers' groups and unions about women's suffrage.

Upton was heavily involved as a leader in the campaign to add women's suffrage to the Ohio Constitution during the 1912 constitutional convention. There was a campaign to collect signatures for a referendum to change the words in the constitution from describing voters as "white male" to "every citizen." Only issues relating to women's suffrage at the convention were limited in time by the committees. Unlike other issues, like bond issues for roads which had a two-week discussion, only three minutes were allowed for debate on women's suffrage and only over the course of two days. A proposal for a voter referendum created by the Committee on the Elective Franchise at the convention passed by a vote of 76 to 34. Now the referendum would go out for a state-wide vote.

Women in Dayton distributed around 20,000 leaflets and letters in support of women's suffrage leading up to the 1912 referendum election. From Cleveland, Hauser brought petitions to the Ohio State Legislature and then started working as a lobbyist for suffrage there. Suffragists in Cincinnati reached out to German-American voters, who were normally anti-suffrage. OWSA organized a parade in support of women's suffrage in Columbus on August 27. Ohio received national attention for the possibility of passing the amendment.

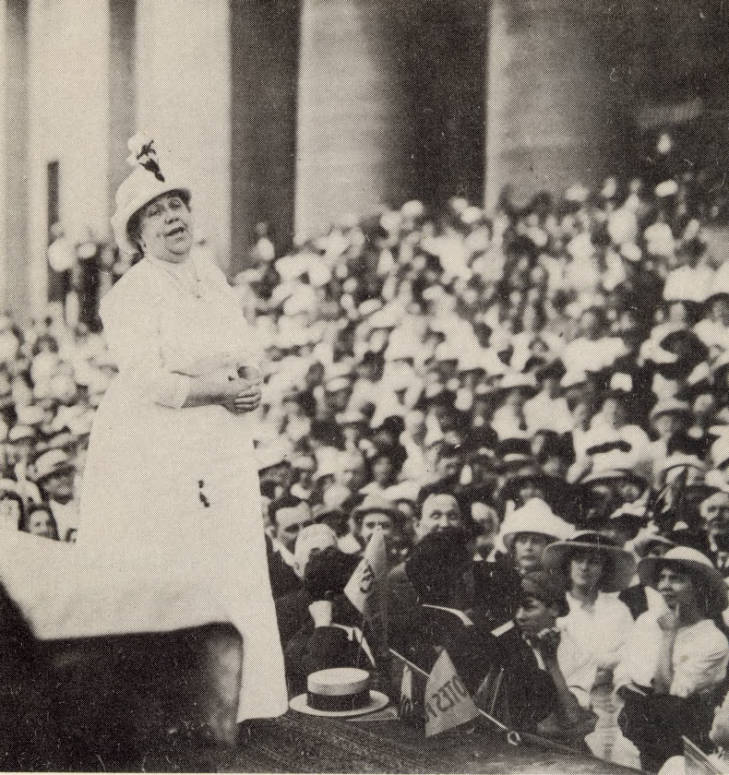
Harriet Taylor Upton speaks at the Ohio Statehouse in 1914

Anti-suffragists were also campaigning against the amendment during this time. A campaign using anonymous handbills tied the issue of women's suffrage to prohibition, making it unpopular. OWSA offered a $100 reward for information about who was passing out these anti-suffrage handbills, but the authors were never discovered.

The 1912 women's suffrage amendment failed with 88 counties opposing and 24 supporting. Nearly 100,000 people voted against the measure. The vote may not have passed for several reasons. There were worries that women's suffrage would lead to prohibition and anti-prohibitionist, Percy Andreae, claimed that the vote had become a "wet and dry issue" rather than one on suffrage. Suffragists had also aligned themselves with Theodore Roosevelt who was running as a third-party candidate which was seen as a negative by the press.

After the women's suffrage measure failed, women regrouped and reorganized. In Franklin County, women founded the Franklin County Women's Suffrage Association (FCWSA) which was an umbrella group that included the Woman's Taxpayers' League (WTL), the College Equal Suffrage League, the Columbus Equal Suffrage League, the First Voter's League, the Men's League for Equal Suffrage and the Sojourner Truth Women's Suffrage Association (STWSA).

The new Ohio constitution now allowed voter referendums to be placed on the ballot for constitutional amendments. The suffragists in Ohio decided to take advantage of this, putting a woman's suffrage issue before Ohio voters. Between March and July 1914, activists were able to gather more than 130,000 signatures for a women's suffrage referendum.

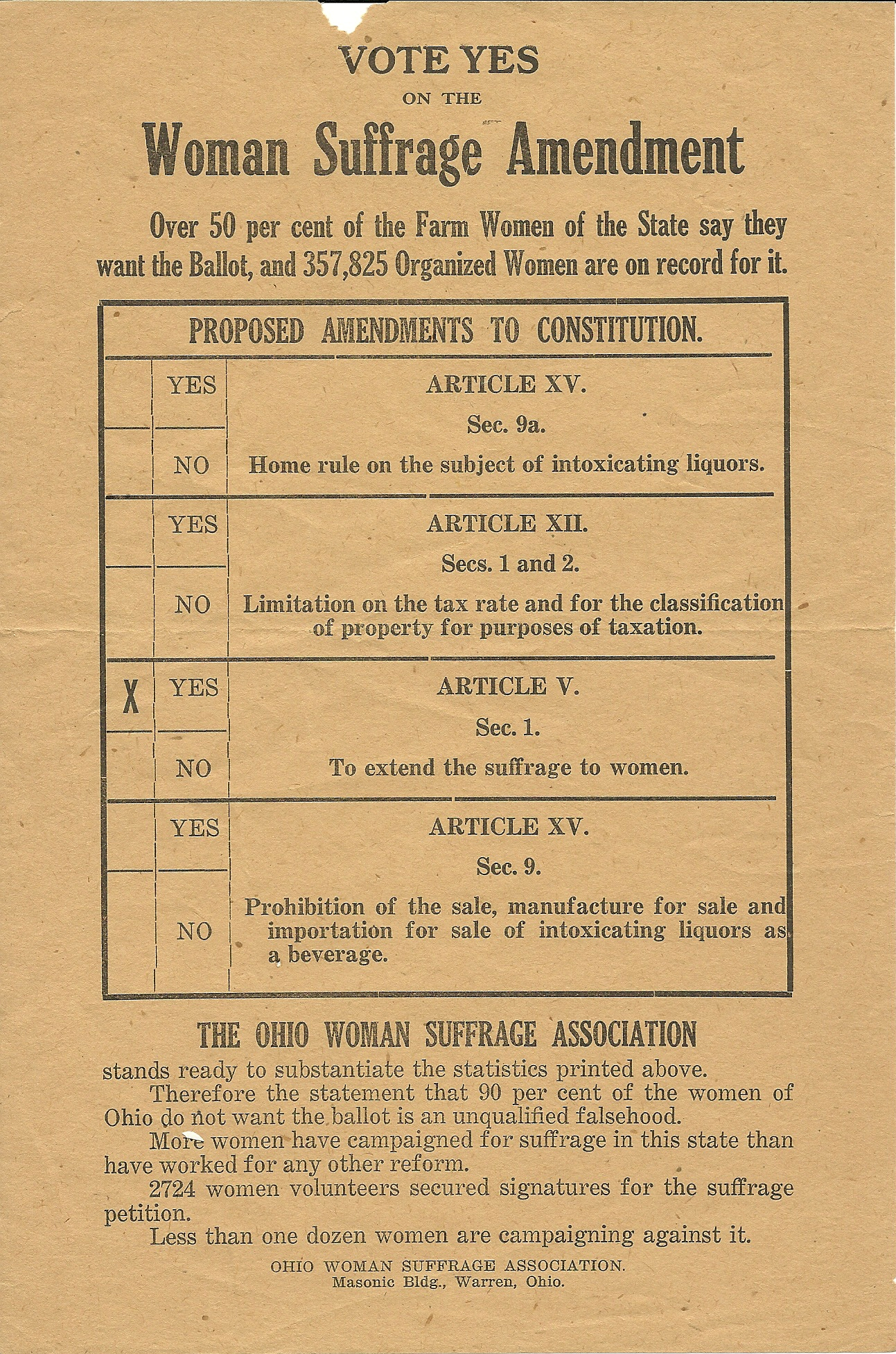
A broadside promoting the referendum on the Ohio ballot from the Ohio Woman Suffrage Association in 1914

OWSA also worked to lobby the major political parties in Ohio in 1914 in support of suffrage efforts. By January 1914, both the Socialist and Progressive parties in Ohio said they would support women's suffrage. The Republican party in Ohio also began to support suffrage in tentative ways, but never fully committed themselves that year. On May 9, Mother's Day, preachers who were part of the Ministerial Association of Columbus gave sermons on how women's suffrage was a way for women to better exercise their duties as mothers. Jews in Columbus, including those at the B'Nai Israel Synagogue were also supportive of women's suffrage. Rosalie G. Jones and Elizabeth Freeman took out "The Little Yellow Wagon" in July 1912 from Cleveland and traveled to Medina, promoting the women's vote. Leading up to the 1914 amendment vote, the Wright family, including Katharine Wright and Orville Wright helped campaign for women's suffrage. Katharine organized a suffrage parade on October 24, 1914 in Dayton where Orville and her father, Bishop Milton Wright, also marched. In Lima, Bessie Crayton organized an October suffrage parade that drew around 1,500 people, including a 96-year-old man who marched for women's suffrage.

On the same ballot, the Anti-Saloon League introduced a referendum on prohibition. The suffragists worried that the prohibition initiative would be negatively tied to their cause and women's suffrage would lose support. The suffrage referendum failed.

== Targeted suffrage efforts ==
Many suffragists in Ohio began to focus on more narrow suffrage goals after the 1914 amendment defeat.

In East Cleveland, women won the right to vote in municipal elections on June 6, 1916. The victory in East Cleveland was the first women won for municipal voting east of the Mississippi. With 936 for suffrage and 508 against, the success was written into the new city charter. In 1917, women in Lakewood, Ohio and Columbus also won the right to vote in municipal elections. The driving force behind suffrage efforts in Lakewood came from a group of 123 women who created a Political Study Club. Attempts were made to pass municipal suffrage in Sandusky, Ohio, but the effort failed.

James A. Reynolds, a state representative from Cuyahoga County introduced the so-called Reynolds Bill, in the Ohio Legislature. It would allow women to vote in presidential elections. Harriet Taylor Upton, acting as president of the Ohio Woman Suffrage Association (OWSA), along with Florence E. Allen, Grace Drake and Elizabeth Hauser all testified in January 1917 before the Ohio legislature on the subject of women voting in presidential elections. Upton said that there were no good arguments against giving women the vote and pointed out that women had turned out in Ohio in good numbers for the elections they were eligible to vote in. Governor James M. Cox was supportive of the bill. The bill to allow women to vote in presidential elections passed in 1917. The Reynolds Bill was signed into law in February. The passage of the bill gave hope to suffragists in other states.

Immediately after the bill passed, anti-suffragists vowed to start a referendum to repeal the actions of the Reynolds Bill. Anti-suffragists were able to included a referendum on the ballot to repeal the Reynolds Bill. This was despite allegations of fraud in connection to the signatures filed on the petitions. The OWSA found that in four counties, Scioto, Trumbull, Mahoning and Cuyahoga, out of 9,964 names on the petition, 8,661 were fraudulent. However, other counties were not examined and the referendum was allowed to stand. The Woman Citizen pointed out that the petitions did not represent a grassroots movement and were instead the result of special interests against women's suffrage. The referendum narrowly passed, removing the right of women to vote in presidential elections.

== Ratification ==
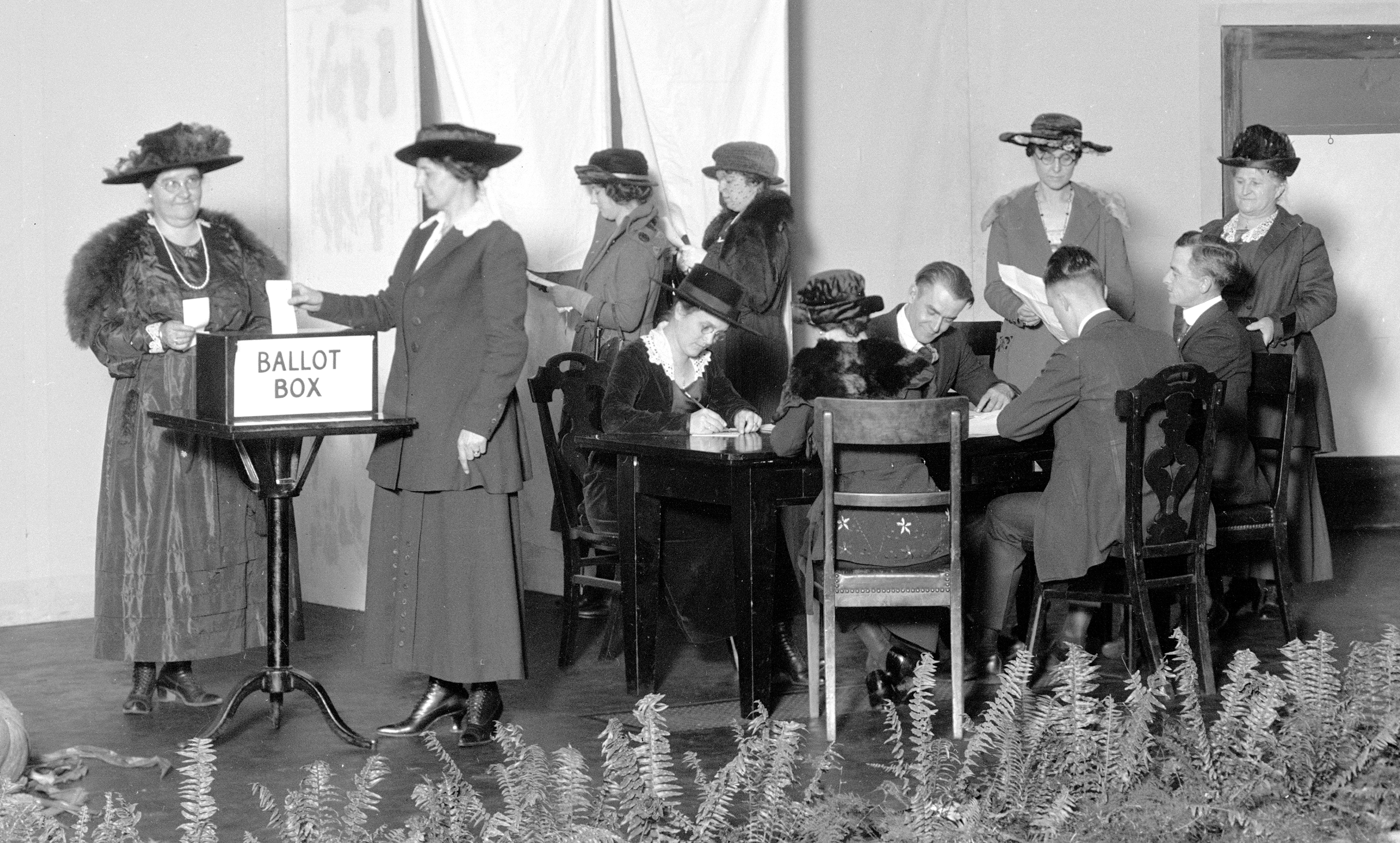
Women practice voting in Dayton, Ohio Oct. 27, 1920

Ohio ratified the Nineteenth Amendment on June 16, 1919, becoming the fifth state to ratify.

An effort to put a voter referendum on the ratification of the Nineteenth Amendment was ended by Ohio Secretary of State, Harvey C. Smith.

In 1923 a referendum vote succeeded in removing the phrase "white male" from the description of a voter in the Ohio Constitution.

== African-American women and suffrage in Ohio ==
Some parts of Ohio were inclusive and worked with African-American women towards women's suffrage. In the Ohio Women's Rights Convention in Akron, Ohio in 1851, Sojourner Truth gave her famous Ain't I a Woman? speech. Mary Church Terrell, an influential clubwoman, attended Oberlin College. Hallie Quinn Brown, who was involved with women's clubs and the Republican Party, was an important suffrage leader in Ohio.

Dayton was fairly inclusive in its suffrage activities. In Cincinnati, suffragists like Dr. Louise Southgate promoted the inclusion of African-American women in the suffrage movement. In Franklin County, the larger umbrella group for women's suffrage, the Franklin County Women's Suffrage Association (FCWSA), was formed in 1912 and worked with the Black women's group, the Sojourner Truth Women's Suffrage Association (STWSA). The Ministerial Association of Colored Preachers in Cincinnati was also supportive of women's suffrage.

When an equal rights bill was defeated by the Republican-majority legislature in Ohio in 1919, Black women demonstrated their displeasure. They changed the name of the Colored Women's Republican Club to the Colored Women's Independent Political League, signalling a "public repudiation" of the Republican Party.

== Male allies ==
Men worked towards women's suffrage early in Ohio history. Timothy Walker, who founded the law school at the University of Cincinnati, helped create a foundation for understanding women's legal's rights. Much later, when the American Woman Suffrage Association (AWSA) was formed during an 1869 convention, Henry Ward Beecher was elected president of the group and William Lloyd Garrison as vice president. When famous suffragists including Susan B. Anthony campaigned in Ohio in 1867, they brought George Francis Train with them on the tour.

In Cleveland, a Men's Equal Suffrage League was established in 1911 to support women's suffrage. The next year, in Columbus, an Ohio State University (OSU) professor, J. V. Denney, helped found a chapter of the league in February. By 1912, there were men's leagues in Cincinnati, Salem, Springfield and Youngstown.

Men's groups helped bridge communications between the women in the suffrage organizations and "formal politics," which was dominated by men.

== Anti-suffragists ==
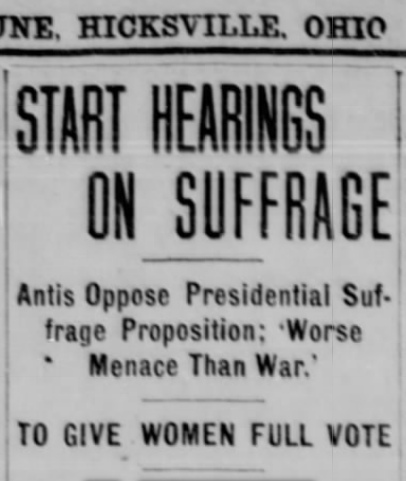
"Start Hearings on Suffrage" headline from The Tribune of Hicksville, Ohio, February 1, 1917

Companies involved with the liquor industry in Ohio were generally opposed to women voting. Women's suffrage in Ohio was closely tied to the issue of prohibition. There were certainly ties between many suffragists and temperance advocates in Ohio, even if suffragists attempted to maintain distance between their activism. Suffragist leader, Harriet Taylor Upton, made this explicit during one campaign, saying "There will be no union of forces with the drys this fall to secure our equal rights amendment to the constitution." Liquor interests continued to fight against women's suffrage, even resorting to fraud, to try to stop women from voting in Ohio.

Women who were opposed to suffrage in Ohio, including Maria Longworth Storer, did not feel that women needed to vote. Women who were part of the privileged and wealthy class did not face many of the problems experienced by working-class women. In a novel by Longworth Storer, The Villa (1918), she described suffragists as "unsexed" criminals.

Other women believed that women's influence was more powerful through working in civic organizations or women's clubs. A petition circulating in Columbus in 1912 expressed the idea that women already had "their full share of influence and responsibility for the public welfare" without the need to vote.

The German immigrant periodicals in Franklin County expressed opinions against women's suffrage. Both local papers, Wöchentliche Columbus Express and the Express Und Westbote described suffragists as unladylike and uplifted the idea of women as the hausfrau. English language periodicals in Columbus also sensationalized the more militant aspects of suffrage activism, publishing stories on the escalating tactics of suffragettes in London. Both the articles published and the imagery used in political cartoons about suffragists "contributed to the stereotype of suffragists as militant or at least as potentially threatening the established sex roles." The German American Alliance in Ohio also opposed women's suffrage.

Some Progressive Party candidates in Ohio did not endorse women's suffrage privately, though publicly they signaled support.

== See also ==
- List of Ohio suffragists
- Timeline of women's suffrage in Ohio
- Women's suffrage in states of the United States
- Women's suffrage in the United States
