= Jane Elizabeth Jones =

American suffragist and abolitionist

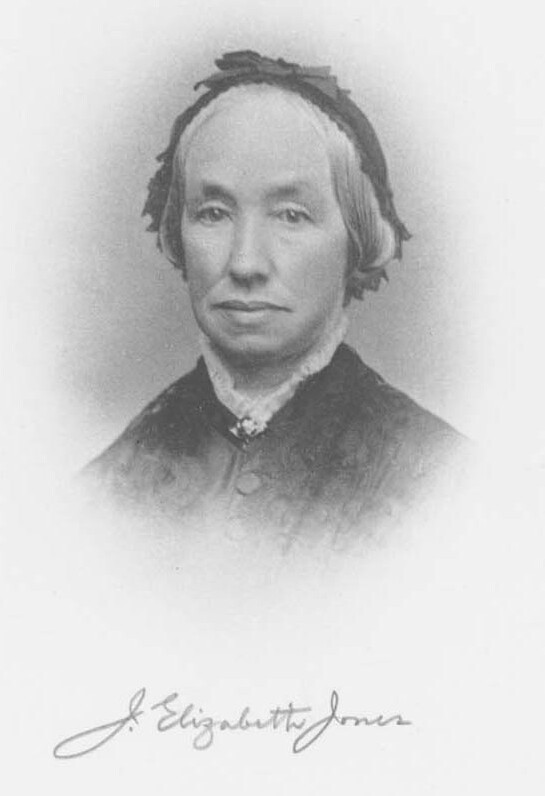
- Born: March 13, 1813; Vernon, New York
- Died: January 13, 1896 (aged 82)

Jane Elizabeth Jones (March 13, 1813 – January 13, 1896) was an American suffragist and abolitionist and member of the early women's rights movement.

== Biography ==
Jane Elizabeth Hitchcock was born in Vernon, New York on March 13, 1813. Her parents were Reuben and Electra Hitchcock (née Spaulding) .

Jones was known for her abolitionist views and traveled throughout New England, Pennsylvania, and Ohio as a lecturer in support of Garrisonian abolitionism. In 1845, she traveled to Salem, Ohio with fellow abolitionist lecturer, Abby Kelley. The pair organized anti-slavery activities. Hitchcock co-edited the Anti-Slavery Bugle along with Benjamin Jones, who would become her husband. In 1850, she delivered a lecture before the Ohio Women's Convention in Salem, Ohio, where she highlighted enslaved people and women, wishing that the term "women's rights" would go out of use and instead focus on human rights for all. In 1861, Jones successfully lobbied with Frances Dana Barker Gage and Hannah Tracy Cutler for Ohio law to grant limited property rights to married women.

In The Young Abolitionist; or Conversations on Slavery, Jones uses the form of a children's book to speak to women's political voices. Through her mother character who discusses with her children slavery in American history, Jones provides a complete history to her reader.

She died on January 13, 1896.

== Bibliography ==
- The young abolitionists, or, Conversations on Slavery. 1948.
- The Wrongs of Women: An Address Delivered Before the Ohio Women's Convention, at Salem, April 19th, 1850. 1850.
- Address to the Women's Rights Committee of the Ohio Legislature. 1861.
