= Andrae =

Andrae, Andræ (Danish) or Andrä is a surname and given name, which is a variant of Andreae, itself a patronymic (via the Latin genitive case) from the personal name Andreas. Notable persons with this name include:

== Surname ==
- Alexander Andrae (1888–1979), German military officer
- Björn Andrae (1981), German volleyball player
- Carl Christoffer Georg Andræ (1812–1893), Danish politician and mathematician
- Elisabeth Andrae (1876–1945), German Post-Impressionist landscape painter and watercolorist
- Emil Andrae (2002), Swedish ice hockey defenceman
- Hansine Andræ (1817–1898), Danish feminist
- Tor Andræ (1885–1947), Swedish clergyman, professor and scholar of comparative religion
- Walter Andrae (1875–1956), German archaeologist and architect

== Given name ==
- Andrae Campbell (1989), Jamaican footballer
- Andraé Crouch (1942–2015), American gospel singer, songwriter, arranger, record producer and pastor
- Andrae Patterson (1975), American former basketball player
- Andrae Thurman (1980), American footballer
- Andrae Williams (1983), Bahamian sprinter
- Andrae Sutherland (1988), aka Popcaan - Dancehall artist
