= Dora Sandoe Bachman =

American lawyer (1869–1930)

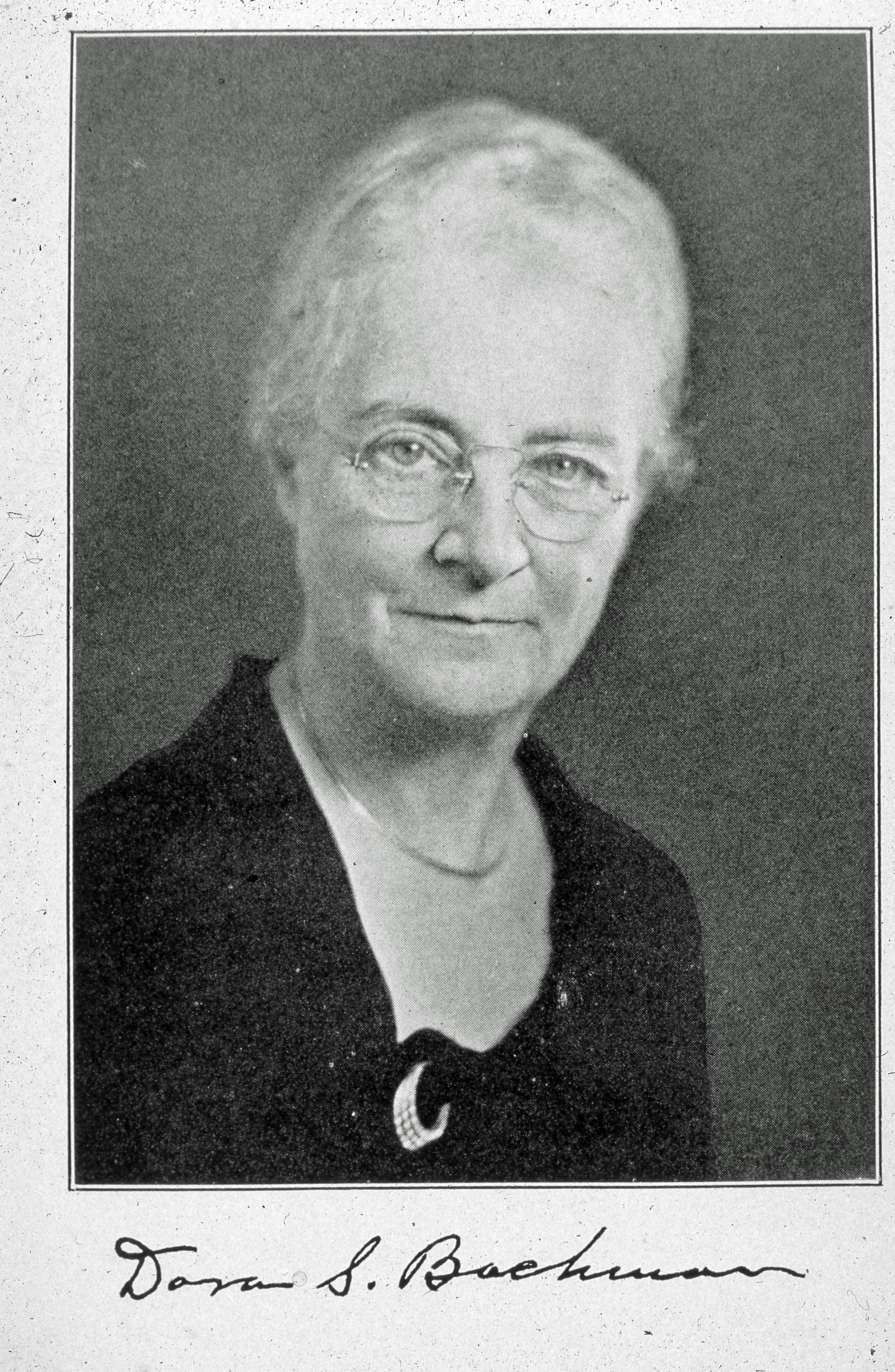
- Born: Lydora Olivia Sandoe; October 8, 1869; Tiffin, Ohio
- Died: January 1, 1930 (age 60); Columbus, Ohio
- Occupations: Lawyer, suffragist, school official

Dora Sandoe Bachman (October 8, 1869 – January 1, 1930) was an American lawyer, community leader, and suffragist. She was the first woman graduate of the Ohio State University College of Law, in 1893. She was vice-president of the Ohio Woman Suffrage Association.

== Early life and education ==
Dora Sandoe was born in Tiffin, Ohio, and raised in Columbus, Ohio, the daughter of Henry Harrison Sandoe and Eliza M. Barton Sandoe. Her father was a pastor in the Reformed Church. She attended Pleasantville Collegiate Institute and Curry University. In 1893, she became the first woman graduate of the Ohio State University College of Law, and the seventh woman admitted to the bar in Ohio.

== Career ==
Bachman taught school as a young woman. She and her husband shared a law practice in Columbus, where she specialized in family law. She was the first woman elected to the Columbus Board of Education, on which she held a seat from 1910 to 1917. She served as board president in 1913, the first woman to be a school board president in an Ohio city. She ran unsuccessfully for a judgeship in 1920. She was attorney for the Florence Crittenden Home in Columbus. She was founding vice-president of the Columbus Home and School Association. She chaired the legislative committee of the Ohio branch of the National Congress of Mothers.

Bachman was vice-president of the Ohio Woman Suffrage Association, during the presidency of Harriet Taylor Upton. She drafted the defeated 1912 Ohio suffrage referendum, and a field worker on the campaign for the 1914 Ohio suffrage referendum, which also failed. In 1913 she was part of the Ohio contingent marching in the large pro-suffrage parade in Washington, D.C. She served as a legal advisor to Alice Paul in the formation of the Congressional Union for Woman Suffrage. "Suffrage is but one step in the evolution of woman," she told a 1917 audience. "Economic independence is the next step." She became head of the Social Hygiene Committee of the Ohio League of Women Voters in 1920.

Bachman was president of the Columbus Cremation Society, and a member of the Columbus Women's Newspaper Club. She spoke at the YWCA in Akron in 1914, on "Woman as a Citizen". She spoke to the Columbus chapter of Kappa Alpha Theta in 1917, on "Ohio Laws Pertaining to Women". She spoke to the Columbus Woman's Homeopathic Society in 1920, on "The Causes of Delinquency" among working girls.

== Personal life ==
Sandoe married fellow lawyer Jacob Leo Bachman. One of their three sons died in infancy in 1904. Her husband died in 1920, and she died in 1930, at the age of 60, in Columbus.
