= Andreae =

Andreae is a surname. The name may refer to:

- Andreae & Co., a historical pharmacy in Hanover
- Charles Andreae (1906–1970), English cricketer
- Giles Andreae (born 1966), British poet, artist, and greeting card writer
- Hieronymus Andreae (died 1556), German woodblock cutter, printer, publisher, and typographer
- Ingrid Andreae (born 1961), Swedish politician
- Jakob Andreae (1528–1590), German Lutheran theologian, signatory of the 1577 Formula of Concord
- Johann Gerhard Reinhard Andreae (1724–1793), German natural scientist and polymath
- Johannes Valentinus Andreae (1586–1654), German theologian
- Julian Voss-Andreae (born 1970), German sculptor living and working in the USA
- Kerstin Andreae (born 1968), German politician and member of Alliance '90/The Greens in the Bundestag
- Laurentius Andreae (1470–1552), Swedish clergyman and scholar, one of the main proponents of the Swedish Protestant reformation
- Otto Stuart Andreae (1863–1930), British actor-manager as Otho Stuart
- Percy Andreae (fl. early 20th century), American anti-prohibitionist
- Volkmar Andreae (1879–1962), Swiss conductor and composer
