= Hannah Tracy Cutler =

American journalist (1815–1896)

- Born: Hannah Maria Conant; December 25, 1815; Becket, Massachusetts, U.S.
- Died: February 11, 1896 (aged 80); Ocean Springs, Mississippi, U.S.
- Other names: Hannah Conant Tracy; Mrs. John Tracy; Mrs. Samuel Cutler; Mrs. Dr. Cutler
- Occupations: abolitionist, women's rights activist, suffragist, lecturer, educator, journalist, farmer, physician
- Spouse(s): John Martin Tracy (1809–1844); Colonel Samuel Cutler (1808–1873)

Hannah Maria Conant Tracy Cutler (December 25, 1815 – February 11, 1896) was an American abolitionist as well as a leader of the temperance and women's suffrage movements in the United States. Cutler served as president of the Ohio Woman Suffrage Association and the American Woman Suffrage Association (AWSA). Cutler helped to shape the merger of two feminist factions into the combined National American Woman Suffrage Association (NAWSA).

Cutler wrote for newspapers and journals; she drafted laws and authored several books. She lectured on physiology and attained a medical degree at the age of 53. Cutler presented petitions to state and federal legislatures, and helped to form temperance, abolition, suffrage and women's aid societies in Ohio, Illinois, Iowa, Nebraska and Vermont.

== Early life and Oberlin ==
Hannah Maria Conant was born in Becket, Massachusetts, on Christmas, 1815; the second daughter of John Conant and Orpha Johnson Conant. Hannah Maria Conant began at age 14 to study rhetoric and philosophy on her own, and she studied Latin with the family doctor. In 1831, the Conant family moved to Rochester, Ohio.

In 1833, nearby Oberlin College began accepting women students, and Conant asked her father for tuition. He refused; he considered coeducation improper. In response, she married John Martin Tracy (1809–1844), an Oberlin theology student, in 1834. The new Mrs. Hannah Conant Tracy studied her husband's textbooks and the newlyweds discussed what he had learned in class. John Tracy turned to study law, and his wife continued to study his legal homework with him, discovering in the process the common law limitations placed on women, especially married women. Later, John Tracy became an anti-slavery lecturer and activist. The couple had two daughters, Melanie in 1836 and Mary in 1841, and a son was on the way when in August 1844, John Tracy died of pneumonia taken as a result of exposure and abuse suffered when he was pursued by a mob while helping escaped slaves. The young widow Hannah Conant Tracy moved with her children to Rochester, Ohio where her father still lived, and bore her third child: John Martin Tracy, named after his martyred father. To support her family, Tracy wrote for Ohio newspapers including for Cassius Marcellus Clay's True American (writing under a pseudonym) and for Josiah A. Harris at the Cleveland Herald. Through her writing she gained a respectable status as a minor literary figure in the West as well as a reputation for her views on woman's rights. Tracy also taught school, and helped to form a temperance society and a Women's Anti-Slavery Society, which attracted only three members at first.

In the fall of 1846, Tracy received a letter from Lucy Stone at Oberlin College, with whom she had already developed a warm friendship. Stone had decided to become a women's rights reformer after graduating the following summer, and Tracy was one of several known advocates of women's rights from whom Stone sought advice on how to begin. Tracy cautioned that to make woman "both physically and intellectually man's equal" would require a societal revolution that would take at least a generation to accomplish. But saying that much could be done by one woman alone "if she possesses courage enough to act up to her convictions," Tracy advised "a quiet but thorough agitation" among the women at hand. And she asked, "Please write me again and let me know your plan, and also what I can do."

In early 1847, Hannah Tracy went to Oberlin, opened a boarding house, and enrolled in the ladies' course. She was one of a handful of women who, with Stone, formed an off-campus women's debating club to gain practical rhetorical exercise denied them in their classes. In June, Tracy spearheaded a brief effort to establish a women's newspaper at the college. The Young Ladies Association voted themselves into an Association of the Oberlin Ladies Banner, the name chosen for their paper, and appointed Tracy editor. But the project failed to win the approval of college officials needed to go forward.

After a year of study, Tracy accepted the position of matron of the Deaf and Dumb Asylum at Columbus, Ohio (now the Ohio Institution for the Deaf and Dumb). In Columbus, Tracy met Frances Dana Barker Gage, another abolitionist and feminist; both were interested in advancing the Free Soil Party with its anti-slavery platform. Tracy helped in the effort to elect abolitionist Salmon P. Chase to the United States Senate. Because the Deaf and Dumb Asylum allowed only one of her children to remain in residence with her, in 1849 Tracy accepted a position as principal of the "female department" at Columbus' new public high school. Tracy attended a Presbyterian church in Columbus.

== Journalism and women's rights ==
To augment her income as principal, Tracy continued to write for newspapers, especially the Ohio Cultivator, a farmer's newspaper for which she contributed two long-running columns, popular with the readership. One column was "Letters to Housekeepers" directed at farmer's wives, and the other was an advice column for farm girls, where Tracy answered letters under the pen name "Aunt Patience".

Tracy and Gage led the drive to organize a women's rights convention in Akron, in May 1851. Gage was elected president and Cutler secretary of the women's convention, where they met Sojourner Truth and witnessed her famous speech: Ain't I a Woman?. Following the Akron conference, Tracy attended a Peace conference in Columbus, and was chosen as delegate to the upcoming Peace Congress to be held in London in August.

The owner of the Ohio Statesman, Colonel Samuel Medary, asked Tracy to become his special correspondent at The Great Exhibition in London. After the Akron convention, the newspaper paid for Tracy's trip to London so that she could report on the World's Fair. Tracy also carried credentials as the United States delegate to the Peace Congress, but arrived one day late, and was able to hear only the closing speeches. While in London, Tracy gave a series of women's rights lectures, the first ones that addressed women's legal rights, and found herself with great authors and members of Parliament taking in her words. The result was that she was invited to speak at colleges and in front of professional organizations; she refused a proposal to become a stage actress. Other speeches she gave covered temperance and physiology. She met Joseph Sturge and William Ewart Gladstone, but was more interested in hearing details about the Emancipation of the British West Indies from anti-slavery activist Anna Knight. Tracy introduced the Bloomer costume to English women.

Upon her return to the United States, Tracy paused in Pittsburgh, Pennsylvania, so she could attend the Free Soil Convention; there she was urged to take the platform and speak about human rights. At the convention in Massillon, Ohio, held in 1852, Tracy was chosen president of the Ohio Woman's Rights Association. Later that year, Tracy married Colonel Samuel Cutler, a widower who had children of his own. The two bought farm land in Dwight, Illinois, near a proposed rail line, and together assumed farm duties. The new Mrs. Hannah Tracy Cutler carried out much of the work herself, including "spinning, weaving, knitting, tailoring, baking, dairying, basket-weaving, shoe-making, and hat-braiding," according to a later account by her daughter Mary. Cutler home-schooled all the children of the family.

Cutler wrote an article for The Una defending the essential difference between men and women:

The objector meets us with the oft repeated cry, "would you unsex woman and render her the same selfish being that you find in man, when immersed in the strife and chicanery attendant upon political relations? Once and for all, let the answer be an emphatic NO!! But since, because men here have had no appropriate balance, all this evil has occurred, we feel that the moral harmony of the world demands woman's interest and influence. We ask to use it, not that we may become like men in our moral natures, but because that we are unlike them; and hence harmony demands the counterbalancing influence of our softer sympathies, our more gentle natures, to balance the stern, cold, calculating spirit of the other sex."

== National stature ==
Although Tracy did not attend the first three National Women's Rights Conventions, held in the East, she did attend the 1853 convention, held in Cleveland, as well as the 1854 convention, in Philadelphia, where she spoke alongside Ernestine Rose, Frances Gage, Lucy Stone, Lucretia Mott, Thomas Wentworth Higginson and William Lloyd Garrison. Cutler expressed to the convention her belief that the spirit of the Bible was more important than the letter. Rather than focusing on isolated passages that had no modern-day application, Cutler recommended her audience "proclaim the beautiful spirit breathed through all its commands and precepts." After the 1855 convention that met in Cincinnati adopted a plan of circulating woman suffrage petitions in as many states as possible, Tracy agreed to take up the work in Illinois.

In late May 1856, Cutler was on her way to preside over a Woman's Temperance Convention in Chicago when she heard about arson and crimes committed in Lawrence, Kansas against abolitionists. During the successful temperance convention, Cutler conceived and planned for a Woman's Kansas Aid Convention to follow two weeks afterward, for the purpose of helping displaced citizens and preventing Kansas from becoming a slave state. Frances Dana Barker Gage and Josephine Griffing assisted in the work of gathering supplies and forwarding them to those in need in Kansas. Spurred by the women's effort, Gerrit Smith, Thurlow Weed and other politically active men organized a National Kansas Aid Convention in Buffalo, New York, beginning July 10. Cutler and Gage attended; soon, the Woman's Society was consolidated into the national group.

In October 1859, Cutler joined with Susan B. Anthony on a lecture tour of New York state, resulting in legislation for expanded property rights for New York women passed the next year. In late 1860, Cutler toured the interior and western parts of Illinois with Gage to influence legislation under consideration in that state. Cutler consulted repeatedly with Abraham Lincoln before he left for Washington, D.C., and she drafted a law affecting married women's property which saw passage in February, 1861. In the spring of 1861, Cutler returned to Ohio to join a group of women arguing before a joint House–Senate committee regarding a woman's right to keep her own earnings, and for a woman's right to joint guardianship of her children.

A year or two later, Cutler presented to the Illinois Assembly petitions for a law which proposed to give a woman guardianship of her children, and to allow a woman to easily assume the estate of her deceased husband if the estate were not more valuable than $5,000, in a manner similar to a state law applying to male widowers. Cutler described the scene in the Assembly:

This petition, asking for these reasonable and righteous laws, was, by motion of Colonel Mack, in a spirit of burlesque, referred to the Committee on Internal Navigation, and a burlesque report was made in open Senate, too indecent to be entered on the records. The grave and reverend seigniors, on this, indulged in a hearty guffaw, hugely enjoyed by his honor Lieutenant-Governor Hoffman, and, to this day, no further action has been taken to give the wife and mother this small modicum of justice...

During the Civil War, Cutler served as president of the Western Union Aid Commission in Chicago. From 1862 to 1864, the Commission worked to provide for war refugees of all colors streaming into Chicago. Her son John Martin Tracy and the sons of Colonel Samuel Cutler served in the Union Army. A conversation with Reverend Doctor Thomas M. Eddy about Lincoln's stated wish to be pressured strongly by abolitionists to free the slaves as an emergency war measure caused Cutler to begin gathering such signatures in the West. Lucy Stone, Elizabeth Cady Stanton and Susan B. Anthony were alerted by Cutler, and began gathering petitions in the East. Charles Sumner presented the combined petitions to the Senate, and told Cutler that four men were required to carry the massed documents. While in Washington, Cutler was invited by former governor William Bebb to address the Union League; she gave a speech entitled "The Union as it was, the Constitution as it is," an argument that slavery had been, despite states' rights, a violation of the national constitution from the very first. Bebb agreed with Joseph Holt, Preston King and other jurists that Cutler's speech was "the most able and conclusive argument that they had ever listened to upon that subject." Cutler joined with Dorothea Dix to appeal to the surgeon general to empower his examining surgeons the ability to extend sick furloughs and grant discharges to severely wounded soldiers. The women were successful in their mission. Colonel Samuel Cutler learned of the death of one of his sons in the Second Battle of Fort Wagner. John Martin Tracy survived the war, and was commended for his stealthy reconnaissance work. Hannah Tracy Cutler's final service in the war was to help the Union Aid Society gather and send six thousand bushels of seed corn to farmers in the war-torn southwest. Samuel Cutler was unnerved and weakened from age and from the loss of a son, and the couple could no longer work the farm in Dwight. They moved to Cobden, Illinois, where his health improved from her ministrations.

In the autumn of 1868, Cutler moved with her husband to Ohio so that she could attend the Women's Homeopathic College of Medicine and Surgery in Cleveland. She received her medical degree in February, 1869. Cutler was offered a professorship at the college, and went into medical practice in Cleveland.

Cutler never stopped writing articles for journals and newspapers. She contributed to the Farmer's Advocate after it was bought by Jeriah Bonham in 1860, and she submitted articles to the Rural Messenger from its inception in 1868.

From 1866 to 1869, Cutler served as president of the Ohio delegation to the American Equal Rights Association (AERA). In 1869, Cutler was approached by Anthony and Stanton to join their splinter group of more radical feminists. Cutler kept notes of the meetings, and provided Lucy Stone with a typewritten account of the events which led to the formation, behind Stone's back, of the National Woman Suffrage Association (NWSA). The machinations of Susan B. Anthony and Elizabeth Cady Stanton were described in detail by Cutler. The Ohio Equal Rights Society held a convention in Cincinnati in mid-September, and Stone and her husband Henry Browne Blackwell gave speeches. A proposal was made to form an Ohio Equal Rights Society, and Cutler was made president. Stone responded to Anthony and Stanton by forming the American Woman Suffrage Association (AWSA) in November, in Cleveland, November 24–25, 1869 in front of a "vast hall being well filled." Cutler chaired the afternoon session on the second day; then served as president of AWSA in 1870–1871. Cutler spoke in Battle Creek, Michigan for the Michigan State Suffrage Society in January 1870, then at a mass meeting for Ohioans in Dayton in late April. At their home in Cleveland, Samuel Cutler "could not endure the spring winds on the Lakes," so the two moved back to Illinois in 1870.

The AWSA held a mass convention at Steinway Hall in New York City in May, 1870. Three sessions per day were held for two days, and Cutler was the first speaker for the first evening session. She compared slave's rights to women's rights, and quoted the Declaration of Independence which states "Governments derive their just powers from the consent of the governed." She continued, "The women of America pay taxes for the support of the Government, and their consent should be had in matters affecting their welfare and their lives. ...the only way to remedy the evil is to get the ballot."

In June 1870, Cutler and Amelia Bloomer held two meetings in Des Moines, Iowa, one on the subject of temperance, held in the open air on land planned for a new capitol building, and a second held in a Baptist church, on the subject of women's voting rights. A woman suffrage convention was held in Mt. Pleasant in mid-June; Cutler was the leading speaker, and helped the Iowans form the Iowa Woman Suffrage Society. Later that summer, Bloomer and Cutler lectured in Oskaloosa, Iowa and sparked the formation of a woman suffrage society there, building on a much earlier visit by Frances Dana Barker Gage in 1854. In December 1870, Cutler spoke several times in Lincoln, Nebraska while on her way to California. "Her womanliness and logic won and convinced her hearers", but didn't result in the formation of a local woman suffrage organization until Susan B. Anthony came through later that winter.

In 1871, Cutler made the opening and closing addresses at the annual AWSA convention in Philadelphia. After speeches by Lucy Stone, Julia Ward Howe, Lucretia Mott and others, Cutler spoke about the right to vote:

Some say it is not a right but a privilege. I maintain the contrary. I say it is an inalienable right. You can not maintain a republican form of government and deny to half the population its right to vote.

Samuel Cutler died in 1873. Hannah Tracy Cutler returned to Ohio to join in a strenuous effort to put woman suffrage into the state constitution. Throughout the late summer and fall, Cutler canvassed Ohio county by county, lecturing and gathering signatures for the petition. Cutler's personal style was folksy and feminine, and her manner of lecturing put her listeners at ease. Cutler introduced woman suffrage concepts within a more traditional religious framework, and folded suffrage into speeches about temperance which were likely to have greater appeal with conservative audiences. During the Ohio push, she was described by a fellow suffragist as "Strong in body as well as mind, she endures with comparative ease the fatigues and discomforts of the lecture field, and sends the truth to the hearts of her hearers with a force and directness that is seldom surpassed." At the close of the unsuccessful campaign, "completely exhausted," Cutler went to France with her son, John Martin Tracy, a landscape artist. Worn out, Cutler became seriously ill, and remained in France until 1875. Cutler returned to the United States to practice medicine in Cobden, Illinois, and later in Brentwood, California, where her daughter Mary Tracy Mott lived and wrote.

Cutler attended the Ninth Annual Meeting of the AWSA, held at the Masonic Hall in Indianapolis in 1878. Regarding the battle for woman suffrage, she stood up to say "Many of us have grown old in this work, and yet some people say, "Why do you work in a hopeless cause?" The cause is not hopeless. Great reforms develop slowly, but truth will prevail, and the work that we have been doing for thirty years has paid as well as any work that has ever been done for humanity."

From December 1881 through April 1882, Cutler lived in Hollister, California. She gave a well-received speech from a Congregational pulpit one Sunday in Hollister in early April, and was reported as being "en route for the East".

In 1882, under consideration in Nebraska was an amendment which would remove the word 'male' from the constitution and thus allow women to vote. Both AWSA and NWSA held their annual conventions in Omaha, Nebraska in September for the purpose of influencing votes. Lucy Stone, Henry Browne Blackwell and Cutler were among the featured speakers at the AWSA convention in mid-September, and all three remained afterward to canvass the state. From October 2 to November 4, Cutler gave 24 speeches while touring by rail. The effort failed, but one of the 11 counties that passed the measure was where Cutler spent the days immediately preceding the vote. Cutler finished writing a biographical essay about her first husband and about her own life's work. The essay was published in a collection of biographies about "Eminent Citizens" of Illinois.

In 1883, Cutler gave a series of lectures throughout backwoods Vermont; her influence led to the founding of the Vermont Woman Suffrage Association. On December 13, 1884 Cutler published in the Woman's Journal a eulogy for her longtime friend, Frances Dana Barker Gage.

On December 21, 1887, Cutler was appointed by Anthony and Stone to a committee tasked with joining the AWSA with the NWSA to form the National American Woman Suffrage Association (NAWSA). For the next two years, Cutler worked with Alice Stone Blackwell and Rachel Foster Avery to help establish a common structure and mission for the combined organization.

== Death and legacy ==
Cutler's daughter Melanie Tracy Earle followed in her mother's footsteps to become a journalist. She died in Ocean Springs, Mississippi in 1889. Melanie left behind her husband Parker Earle, a horticulturist, who died in 1917. Mary Tracy Earle, their daughter born in 1864, published seven fiction works in Harper's Magazine.

In 1892 at the Ocean Springs home of her daughter, writer and journalist Mary Tracy Mott, Hannah Tracy Cutler suffered a paralytic attack on top of an advancing case of glaucoma.

Cutler's son John Martin Tracy became a landscape painter featuring hunting dogs in his work, and came to Ocean Springs from Greenwich, Connecticut with his wife Melvina Guillemin Tracy after the death of his sister Melanie. He died four years later in March 1893.

Cutler died February 11, 1896 at the age of 80, and was buried in Ocean Springs at Evergreen Cemetery on Fort Bayou. An Episcopal service was given at her funeral. Mary Tracy Mott finished then submitted her mother's autobiography to Alice Stone Blackwell to be published in a series of Woman's Journal issues from September through October 1896.

== Speeches and writings ==
- Woman as She Was, Is, and Should Be (New York, 1846)
- One of Sixty Thousand
- Phillipia, or a Woman's Question (Dwight, Illinois, 1886)
- The Fortunes of Michael Doyle, or Home Rule for Ireland (Chicago, 1886)
