= Harriet Taylor Upton House =

Historic house in Ohio, United States

- U.S. National Register of Historic Places
- U.S. National Historic Landmark
- U.S. Historic district – Contributing property
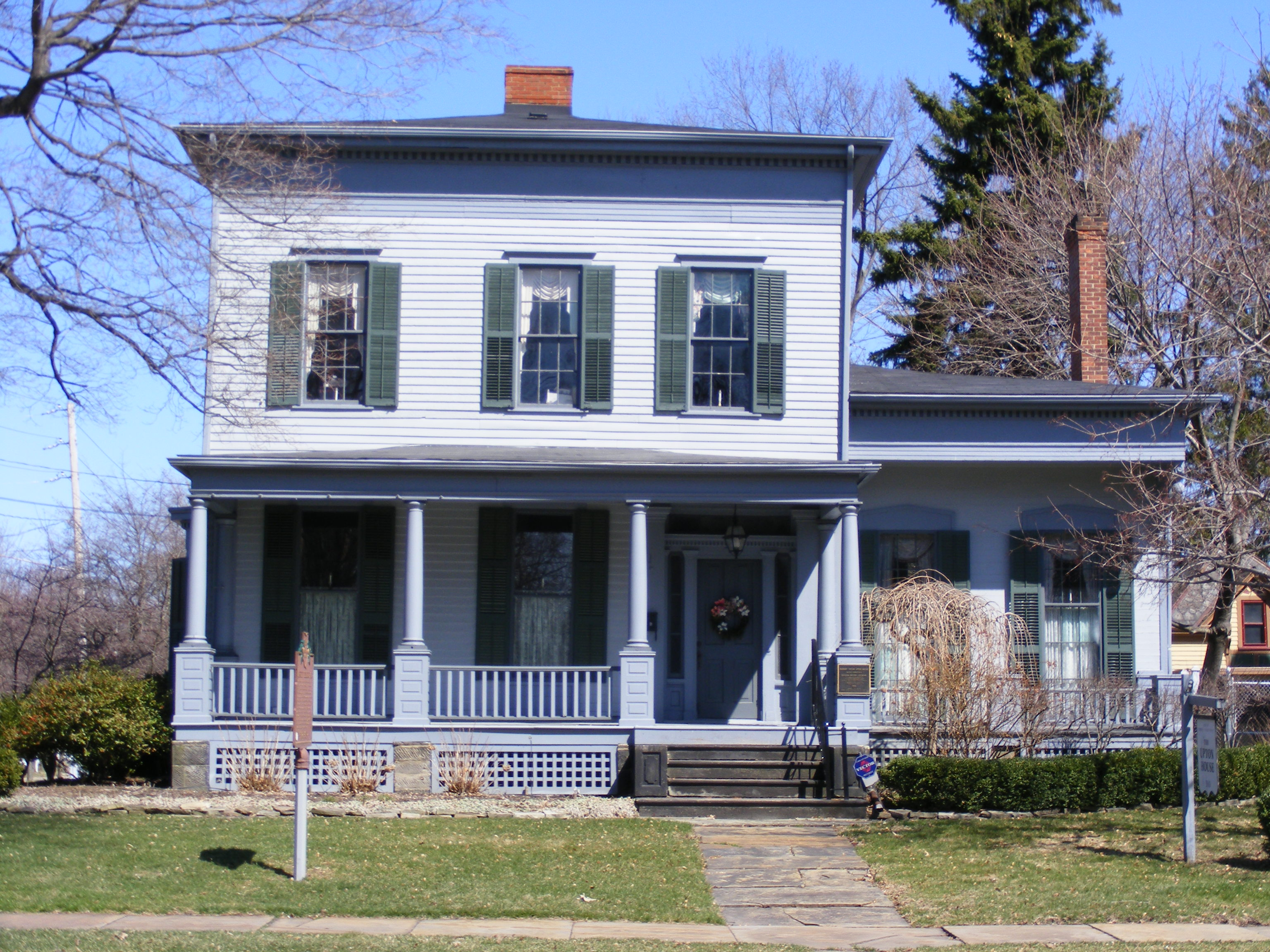
- Front of the house

- Location within Ohio Location within the United States
- Location: 380 Mahoning Ave. NW, Warren, Ohio
- Coordinates: 41°14′22″N 80°49′21″W
- Area: less than one acre
- Built: c. 1840
- Built by: Simon Perkins
- Architectural style: Greek Revival
- Part of: Mahoning Avenue Historic District (1978 increase) (ID78003115)
- NRHP reference No.: 92001884

Significant dates
- Added to NRHP: October 5, 1992
- Designated NHL: October 5, 1992
- Designated CP: May 22, 1978

The Harriet Taylor Upton House is a historic house museum at 380 Mahoning Avenue NW in Warren, Ohio. Built about 1840, it was the residence of suffragette Harriet Taylor Upton (1853–1945) from 1887 to 1931. The house was the headquarters of Upton's National American Woman's Suffrage Association from 1903 to 1905, and was thus an important site in the early 20th century push for women's suffrage. It was designated a National Historic Landmark in 1992. It is owned by a local nonprofit, and is open for tours by appointment.

== Description and history ==
The Harriet Taylor Upton House is located in downtown Warren, on the northeast side of Mahoning Avenue near the municipal offices, an area known locally as "Millionaire's Row". It is a 2 1/2-story wood-frame structure, with a hip roof, clapboarded exterior, and single-story porch across the front. A single-story ell extends to the right at a recess, with an open balustraded veranda in front. The main facade is three bays wide, with the entrance in the right bay. Windows are long on the first floor and shorter on the second, with projecting cornices above the second-floor windows. The interior has been restored to a turn-of-the-century appearance, after a long period of use as a multiunit residence.

The house was built about 1840 by General Simon Perkins for his son Henry. Original carrying Egyptian features, it was at some point given a Greek Revival makeover, the style it had when occupied by Harriet Taylor Upton. It was purchased in 1883 by Congressman Ezra B. Taylor, and given to Upton in 1887. During Upton's term as treasurer of the National Woman Suffrage Association (1894–1910), the organization was headquartered in this house for part of that time (roughly 1903–1909). Upton's leadership of the organization helped keep it afloat during a period in which relatively few gains were made toward women's suffrage, but gave it continuity between its early leaders and the subsequent successful campaigns for the vote.

The house was modernized in the 1930s, and served as a community center before being divided into apartments in the 1950s. In 1989, it was purchased by the Upton Association and restored to the period of Upton's occupancy. It opened as a museum in 2009.

== See also ==
- List of National Historic Landmarks in Ohio
