= Ohio Women's Convention at Salem in 1850 =

Women's rights convention

The Ohio Women's Convention at Salem in 1850 met on April 19–20, 1850 in Salem, Ohio, a center for reform activity. It was the third in a series of women's rights conventions that began with the Seneca Falls Convention of 1848. It was the first of these conventions to be organized on a statewide basis. About five hundred people attended. All of the convention's officers were women. Men were not allowed to vote, sit on the platform or speak during the convention. The convention sent a memorial to the convention that was preparing a new Ohio state constitution, asking it to provide for women's right to vote.

== History ==
The Ohio Women's Convention at Salem met on April 19–20, 1850 in Salem, Ohio. About five hundred people attended. It met at the Second Baptist Church and the Friends (Quaker) Meeting House. It was the third in a series of women's rights conventions that began with the Seneca Falls Convention of 1848 and continued with the Rochester Convention two weeks later. Both of these were regional gatherings in western New York State. The Salem convention was the first women's rights convention to be organized on a statewide basis. The first to be organized on a national basis was the National Women's Rights Convention in Worcester, Massachusetts in October, 1850.

Salem was a center for reform activity. Its inhabitants included a number of anti-slavery activists, many of them Quakers. The Anti-Slavery Bugle, an abolitionist newspaper, was published in Salem beginning in 1845. A local group of the Progressive Friends, an association of Quakers who separated from the main body partly so they could be freer to work for such causes as abolitionism and women's rights, was formed in Salem in 1849. The local school board was composed of abolitionists from both wings of that movement: the followers of William Lloyd Garrison, who opposed involvement in political activity, and supporters of the Liberty Party, an abolitionist political party. All eight members of the school board had female relatives who participated in the Salem convention.

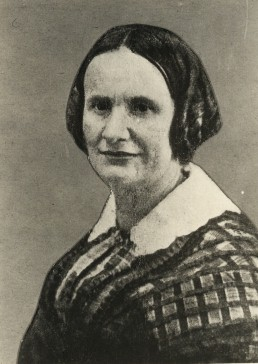
Betsy Mix Cowles

The call to the Salem convention declared that its purpose would be, "[T]o secure to all persons the recognition of equal rights, and the extension of the privileges of government without distinction of sex, or color".

Betsy Mix Cowles was elected president of the convention. Cowles, who had ties to both wings of the abolitionist movement, was a long-time advocate for the rights of African Americans. She led the campaign against laws that discriminated against black children in public schools in Ohio. In 1835 she became the leader of the Female Anti-Slavery Society of Ashtabula County. Jane Elizabeth Jones, an abolitionist lecturer, gave the convention's main address. Josephine Griffing, another prominent activist against slavery and for women's rights, served on the business committee.

All of the convention's officers were women. Men were not allowed to vote, sit on the platform or speak during the convention. The male spectators were supportive, however, and when the convention was over, they created an organization of their own and endorsed the actions of the women's convention.

The convention met less than a month prior to the opening of the state convention that revised the Ohio state constitution in 1850–1851. The Salem convention approved a memorial that was forwarded to the constitutional convention along with 8000 signatures. The memorial concluded by saying:

The law should sustain and protect all who come under its sway, and not create a state of dependence and depression in any human being. The laws should not make woman a mere pensioner on the bounty of her husband, thus enslaving her will and degrading her to a condition of absolute dependence. Believing that woman does not suffer alone when subject to oppressive and unequal laws, but that whatever affects injuriously her interests, is subversive of the highest good of the race, we earnestly request that in the New Constitution you are about to form for the state of Ohio, women should be secured, not only the right of suffrage, but all the political and legal rights that are guaranteed to men."

Letters were read to the convention from prominent women's rights leaders who were unable to attend, including Elizabeth Cady Stanton, Lucretia Mott, and Lucy Stone.

== See also ==
- National Women's Rights Convention
- Pennsylvania Woman's Convention at West Chester in 1852
- Seneca Falls Convention
- Women's suffrage in Ohio

== Bibliography ==
- Isenberg, Nancy (1998). Sex and Citizenship in Antebellum America, University of North Carolina Press. ISBN 0-8078-2442-9
- Stanton, Elizabeth Cady; Anthony, Susan B.; Gage, Matilda Joslyn (1881). History of Woman Suffrage. Volume 1 of 6. Rochester, NY: Susan B. Anthony (Charles Mann Press).
