= Ohio Women's Convention at Akron in 1851 =

Women's rights conference

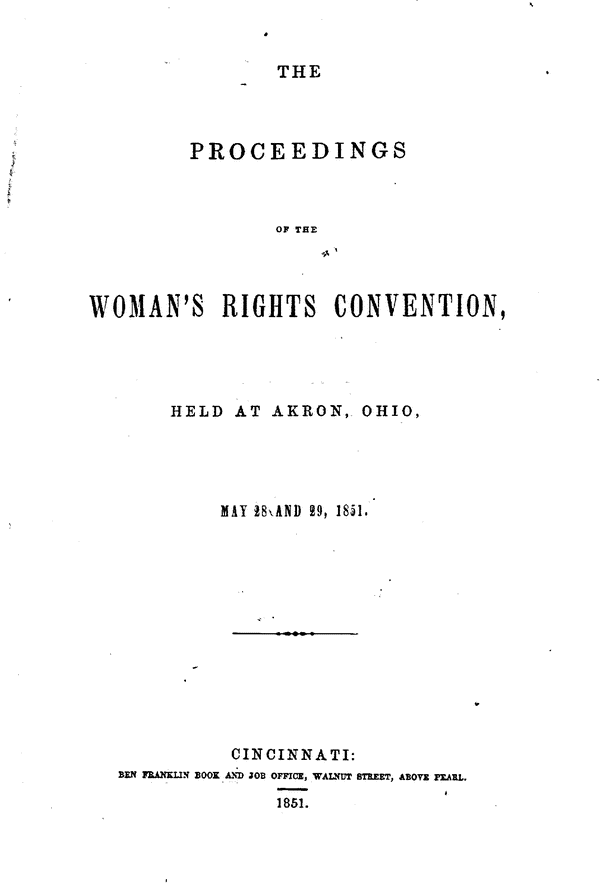
"The Proceedings of the Woman's Rights Convention"

The Ohio Women's Convention met at Akron, Ohio in met on May 28–29, 1851. There, the abolitionist and preacher, Sojourner Truth, delivered one of the most famous speeches in American history. The speech, which did not have a title at the time, became known as the 'Ain't I a Woman?' speech.

== History ==
The Ohio Women's Convention at Akron met for two days on May 28–29, 1851 in Akron, Ohio. The convention was led by Frances Dana Barker Gage, who had previously presided over a similar event in McConnelsville. The convention was not well received locally and several men, including local ministers, heckled speakers at it. During the convention, one of the speakers was the abolitionist and preacher, Sojourner Truth, who gave what became one of the most notable speeches in American women's history. Without a title at the time, the speech later became known under the title of "Ain't I a Woman?". Truth was the only black woman in attendance at the conference and many of the other women present did not want her to speak. Truth delivered the speech from the steps of the Old Stone Church, on the second day of the convention. It was published by journalist Marius Robinson in The Anti-Slavery Bugle on June 21, 1851.

== Legacy ==
In 1981, an Ohio Historical Marker was unveiled on the site of the Universalist "Old Stone" Church in where Sojourner Truth gave her "Ain't I a Woman?" speech on May 29, 1851. Sojourner Truth Legacy Plaza, which includes a statue of her by sculptor and Akron native Woodrow Nash, opened in Akron in 2024.

== See also ==
- List of women's rights conventions in the United States
- Women's suffrage in Ohio
- Ohio Women's Convention at Massillon in 1852
