= Ohio Women's Convention at Massillon in 1852 =

Convention in the USA

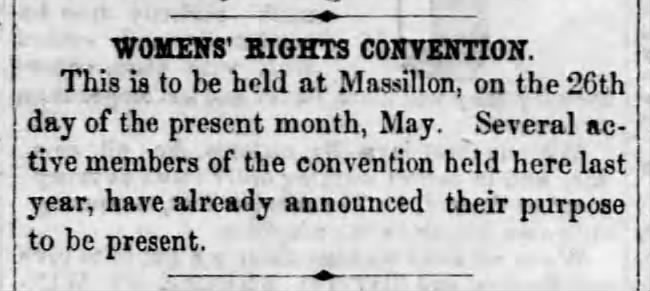
Women's Rights Convention announced in The Summit County Beacon 12 May 1852

The Ohio Women's Convention at Massillon in 1852 met on May 26, 1852 at Massillon, Ohio. At this meeting participants established the Ohio Women's Rights Association.

== History ==
The Ohio Women's Convention met at Massillon, Ohio, on May 26,1852. It was the third in a series of conventions held in Ohio to promote women's rights and was preceded by the Seneca Falls Convention and the Ohio Women's Convention at Akron in 1851. Attendees of the convention were able to use the Pennsylvania and Ohio toll road at half-fair prices. The president of the convention was Hannah Tracy Cutler. The meeting was held in Massillon Baptist Chapel. Attendees came from a broad range of social and economic backgrounds. The convention had been organised by a six-person standing committee which had been formed at Akron. The committee included Betsy Mix Cowles and Mary Whiting. Caroline Severance was one of the notable speakers at the convention.

The proceedings were published in The Anti-Slavery Bugle. The convention received coverage in the national press, including in the New York Tribune. Attendees voted to establish the Ohio Women's Rights Association (OWRA), which held its first meeting the following year in Ravenna. Participants also drafted a constitution for the association.
