= Percy Andreae =

- Born: 31 October 1858; Clapham, London, England
- Died: 3 May 1924 (aged 65); Winnetka, Illinois, U.S.
- Citizenship: U.S. (from 1914)
- Occupations: Brewer, anti-prohibitionist, author
- Known for: Influential anti-prohibition organizer (early 20th century); President of The National Association of Commerce and Labor
- Notable work: Stanhope of Chester: A Mystery (1894); The Prohibition Movement (1915)
- Movement: Anti-prohibition movement

Percy Andreae (October 31, 1858 – May 3, 1924) was an English-American brewer and influential anti-prohibitionist during the early part of the 20th century. After the anti-Saloon League made sweeping victories in the 1908 Ohio state elections, Andreae organized effective resistance to the temperance movement. He soon organized and became president of The National Association of Commerce and Labor to fight temperance organizations on the national level. It largely employed former state Senators and Representatives to further its work.

Andreae was born in Clapham, London to a German father, Carl Andreae of Frankfurt, and an English mother, Emilie Sillem. During the 1890s, Andreae wrote several works of fiction, many of which first appeared in The Windsor Magazine.

Andreae immigrated to the United States in 1896. He settled in Cincinnati before moving to Chicago, becoming a U.S. citizen in 1914. He died in Winnetka, Illinois, aged 65.

== Writings ==
=== Fiction ===
- Stanhope of Chester: A Mystery (London: Smith, Elder, 1894)
- The Mask and the Man: A Novel (London: Smith, Elder, 1894)
- The Signora: A Tale (London: Smith, Elder, 1895)
- The Vanished Emperor (London: Ward, Lock, 1896)
- A Life at Stake (London: Ward, Lock, 1902)

=== Non-fiction ===
- The Prohibition Movement (Chicago: Felix Mendelsohn, 1915)
