= Harriet Taylor Upton =

American suffragist (1853–1945)

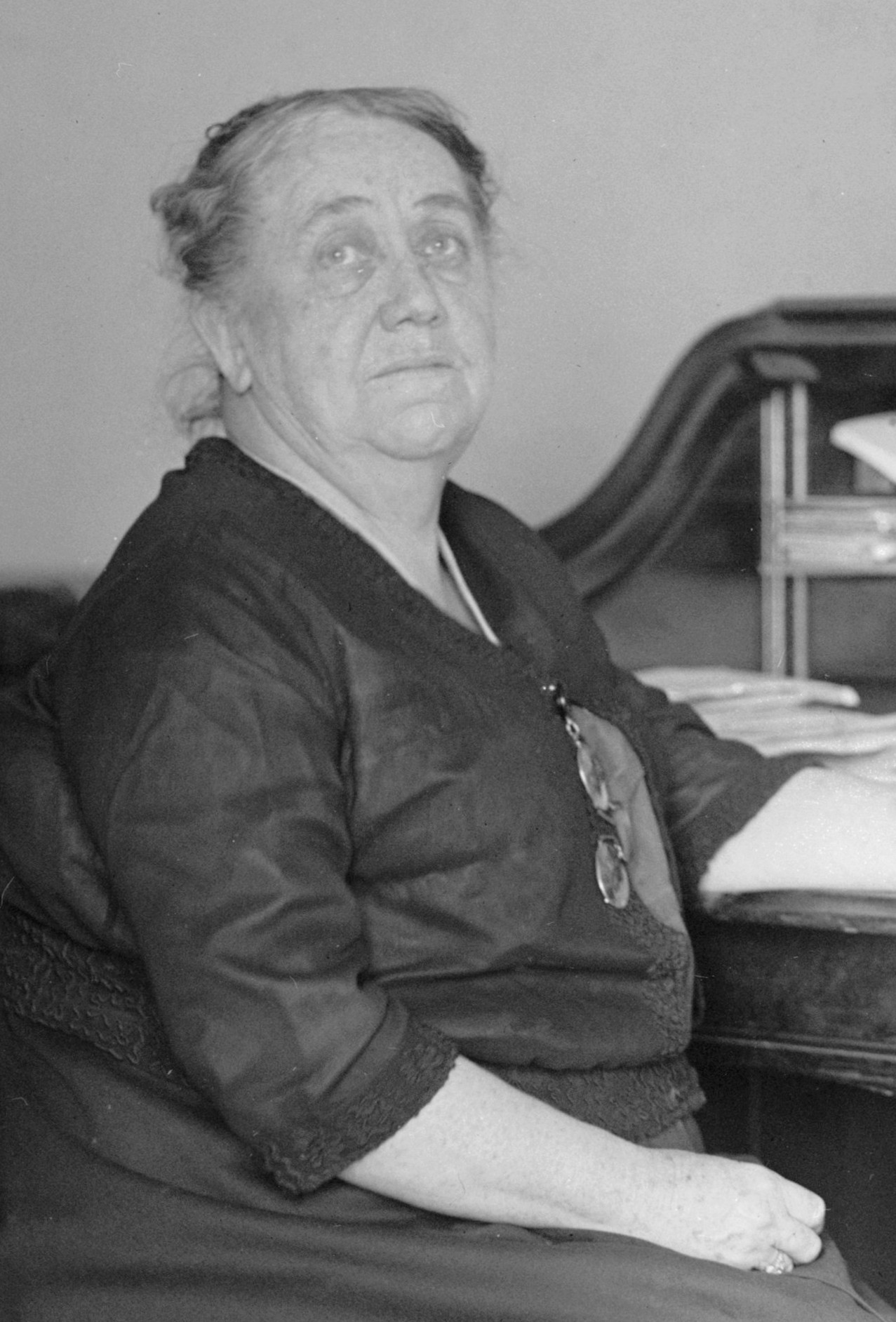
- Upton, 1923

Personal details
- Born: Harriet Taylor; December 17, 1853 Ravenna, Ohio, U.S.
- Died: November 2, 1945 (aged 91) Pasadena, California, U.S.
- Party: Republican
- Spouse: George Upton (1884–1923)
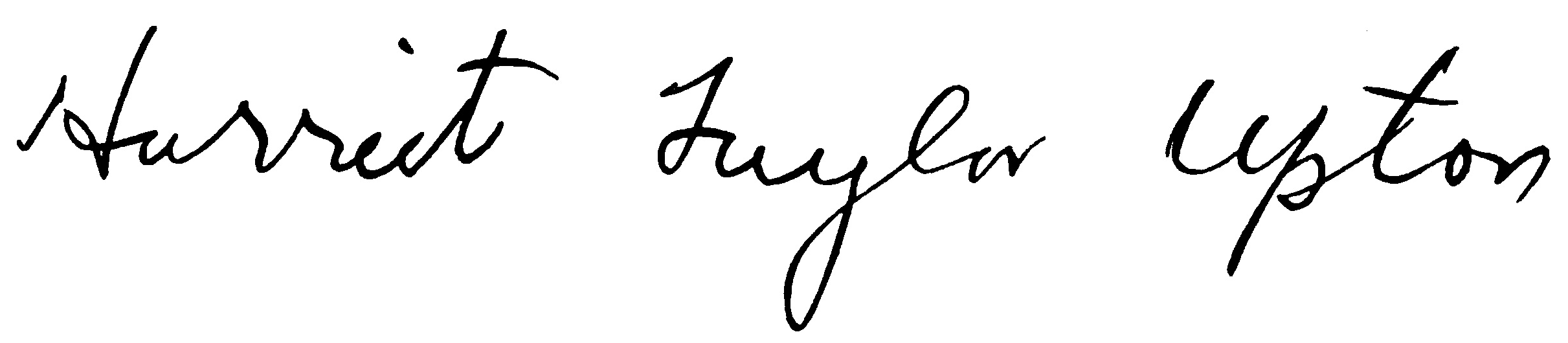
- Signature

Harriet Taylor Upton (December 17, 1853 – November 2, 1945) was an American political activist and author. She was a leading Ohio state and national figure in the struggle for women's right to vote and as the first woman to become a vice-chair of the Republican National Committee.

== Biography ==
=== Early history ===
Harriet Taylor was born December 17, 1853, in Ravenna, Ohio, the daughter of Ezra Taylor, an Ohio judge.

In 1861, the Taylor family moved to Warren, Ohio, and it was there that Harriet attended school. Her formal education was limited to the public schools of Warren.

Taylor married George W. Upton, an attorney, in 1884. Their marriage would last for 39 years.

=== Political career ===
In 1880, Upton's father was elected as a member of the United States Congress as a Republican from Ohio, succeeding President James Garfield in the position. This entrance into the world of high politics provided Harriet with an opportunity to meet leading political leaders of the day, including Susan B. Anthony — the person who brought Upton into the movement to win the right to vote for women.

Upton was a key organizer and the first president of the Suffrage Association of Warren. She was also a member of the National American Woman Suffrage Association (NAWSA) from 1890. In 1891, Upton hosted a conclave of women seeking equal rights with men, Ohio Women in Convention, in her home.

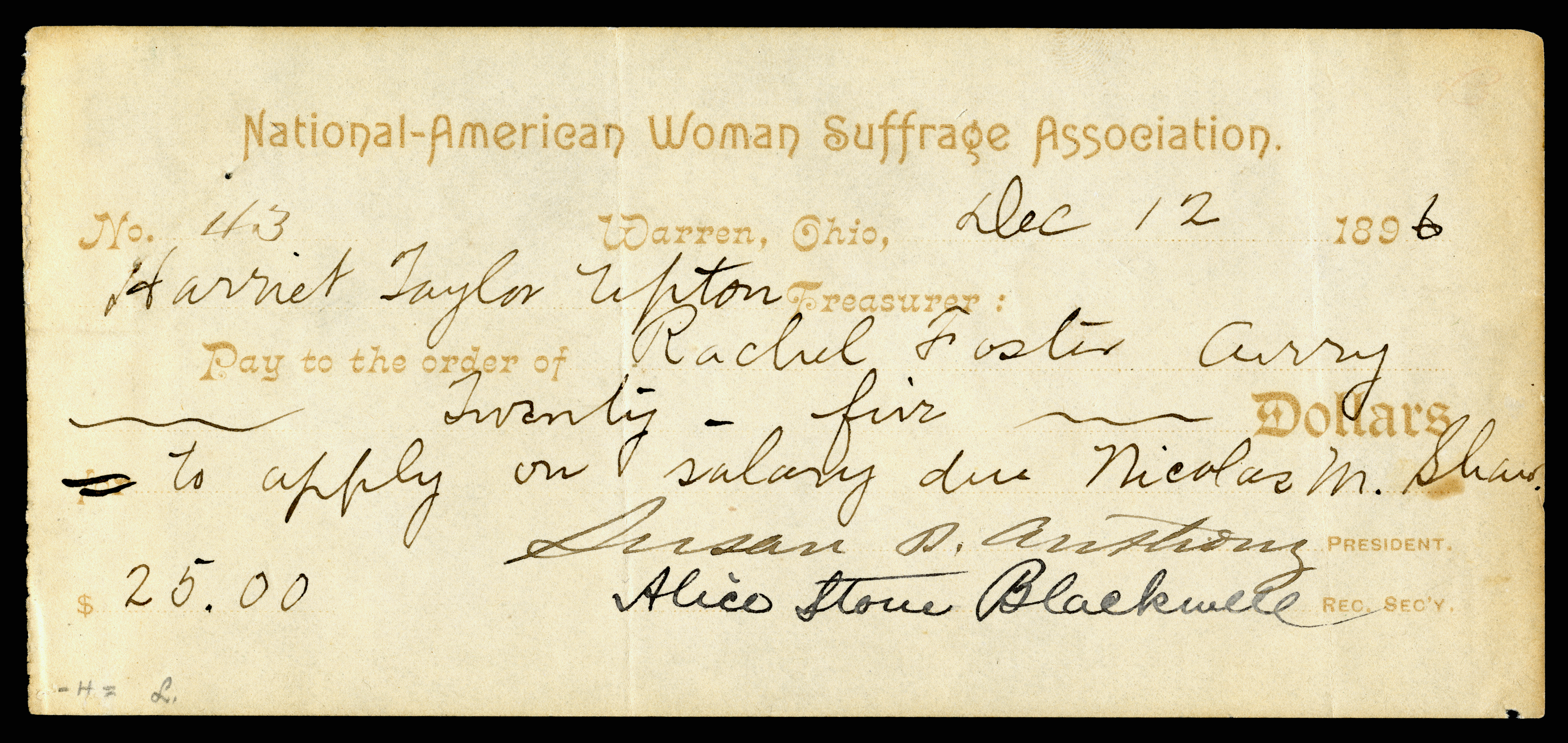
Susan B. Anthony & Alice Stone Blackwell signed NAWSA check, written by the group's treasurer Harriet Taylor Upton.

In 1894, Upton was elected as the treasurer of the NAWSA, the leading national woman suffrage organization. She brought the headquarters of that organization home to Warren, Ohio, from 1903 to 1910, the end of her tenure in that position. In her memoir, she noted that women's right to vote had come at some cost: a decline in chivalry. "Men may not be as good to us as they were before we got the vote, but they have a lot more respect for us." In her view, the tradeoff was worth the cost. Additionally, Upton served as president of the Ohio Woman Suffrage Association from 1899 to 1908, and again from 1911 to 1920.

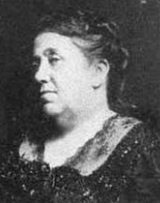
Harriet Taylor Upton, 1921

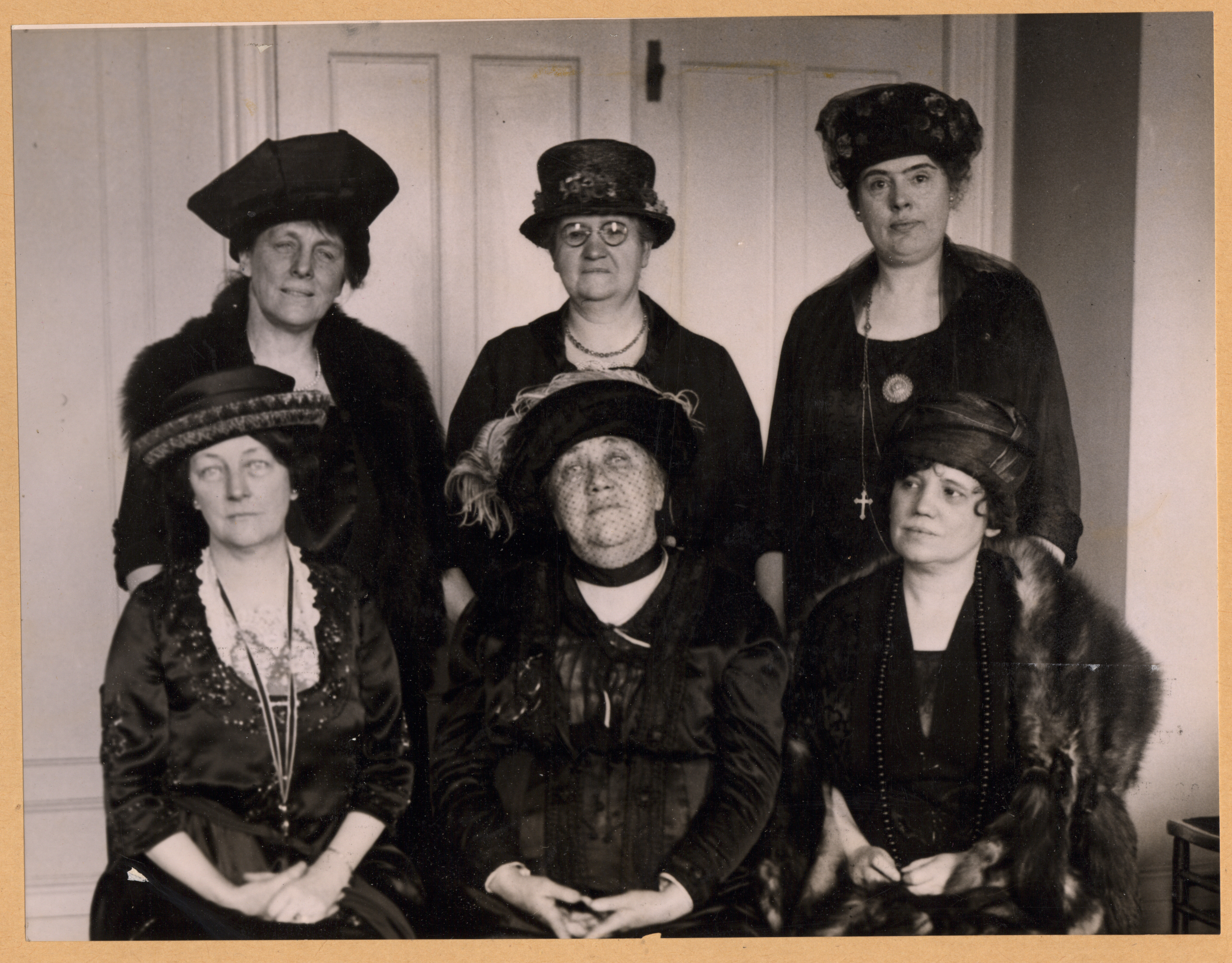
standing: Corinne Roosevelt Robinson, Mrs. Jennette Hyde, Mrs. Carrie Fosseen, seated: Mrs. Arthur Livermore, Mrs. Harriet Upton, Mrs. Christine Bradley, c. 1921

In 1920, Upton was elected Vice Chair of the Executive Committee of the Republican National Committee. She was the first woman to serve on that highest national body of Republican Party politics. She stepped down from this position in June 1924 in an attempt to follow her father into the halls of Congress, running unsuccessfully in the August Republican primary election in the Ohio 19th District for the House of Representatives.

In 1928, Upton served as the assistant campaign manager for the Republican Party of Ohio. For all her successes and honors on the national stage, Upton's personal electoral success was modest, being the first woman to be elected to the Warren Board of Education.

Throughout her life Upton participated in a number of other organizations, including the Daughters of the American Revolution, the Woman's Christian Temperance Union, the Women's Relief Corps, and the Episcopal Church.

=== Death and legacy ===
Harriet Taylor Upton died in Pasadena, California, on November 2, 1945, aged 91. She was inducted into the Ohio Women's Hall of Fame in 1981, in the category of Government and Military Service.

In early 2010, Upton was proposed by the Ohio Historical Society as a finalist in a statewide vote for inclusion in Statuary Hall at the United States Capitol.

The Harriet Taylor Upton House in Warren, Ohio, is a National Historic Landmark.

In March 2021, Mike Loychik, a member of the Ohio House of Representatives proposed a bill that would rename Ohio's Mosquito Lake State Park to "Donald J. Trump State Park". In response to this, a local resident began a petition with the goal of renaming it after Harriet Taylor Upton.

== Works ==
- The Foster-Children of Washington. Boston: D. Lothrop, 1888. —Children's book.
- The Household of Andrew Jackson. Boston: D. Lothrop, 1889. —Children's book.
- Our Early Presidents, Their Wives and Children: From Washington to Jackson. Boston: D. Lothrop Co., 1890. —Children's book.
- The Family of Jefferson. Boston: D. Lothrop, 1891. —Children's book.
- A Twentieth Century History of Trumbull County, Ohio: A Narrative Account of Its Historical Progress, Its People, and Its Principal Interests. Vol. 1 | Vol. 2 Chicago: Lewis Publishing Co., 1909.
- A History of the Western Reserve and Its People. Vol. 1 | Vol. 2 | Vol. 3 Chicago: Lewis Publishing Co., 1910.
- Militancy: An Excuse. Warren, OH: Ohio Woman Suffrage Association, n.d. [c. 1910].
- Japanese Gardens. London : Methuen & Co., 1912.
- Random Recollections of Harriet Taylor Upton: An Autobiography. n.c. [Columbus, OH?]: n.p., 1927.
