= Caroline Severance =

American suffragist (1820–1914)

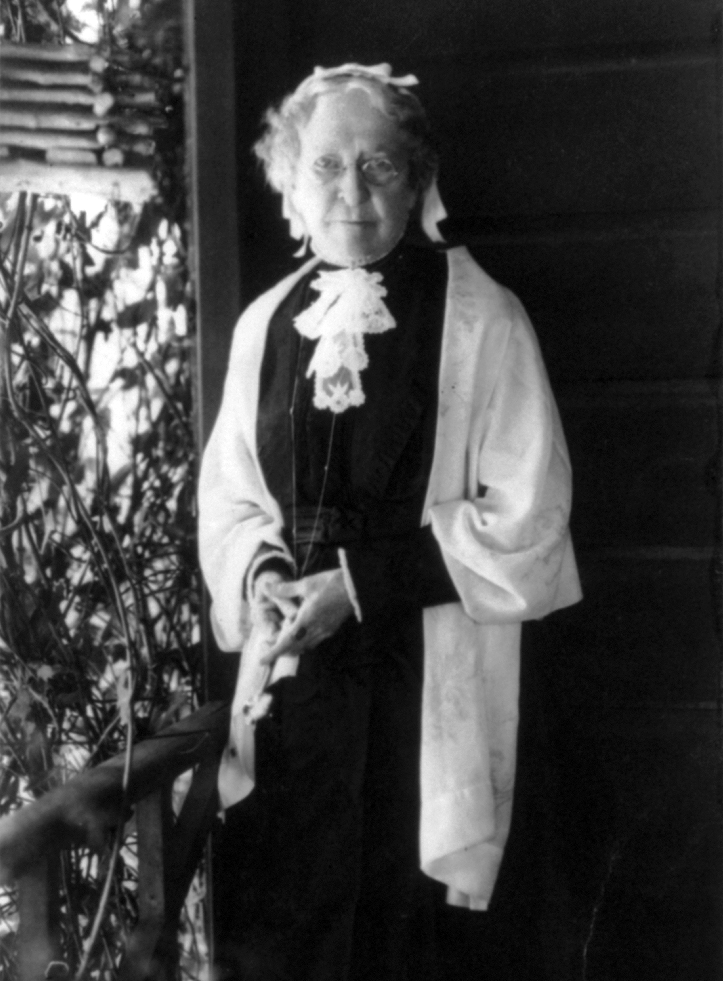
- Severance in 1910
- Born: Caroline Maria Seymour; January 12, 1820; Canandaigua, New York, US
- Died: November 10, 1914 (aged 94); Los Angeles, California, US
- Other name: Caroline Maria Seymour Severance

Caroline Maria Seymour Severance (1820–1914) was an American abolitionist, suffragist, and founder of women's clubs.

== Early life and education ==
Caroline Maria Seymour was born on January 12, 1820, in Canandaigua, New York, the daughter of a banker, Orson Seymour, and his wife Caroline M. Clarke. Caroline's father died in 1824, and the family relocated to Auburn, New York. A strict Presbyterian uncle had an outsized influence over Caroline.

Caroline attended the Upham Female Seminary in Canandaigua and Miss Almira Bennett's Boarding School in Owasco Lake, New York. She graduated as valedictorian from Miss Ricord's Female Seminary in Geneva at age fifteen in 1835 and served on the faculty of Auburn Female Seminary. For a short time she taught at Mrs. Luther Halsey's boarding school for girls on the Ohio River below Pittsburgh.

== Marriage to T.C. ==
In 1840, Caroline married Theodoric C. Severance, (nicknamed T. C.), an abolitionist banker from Cleveland, Ohio. T.C. and Caroline had five children between 1841 and 1849, one of whom died in infancy. The pair initially settled in Cleveland, and their home became a meeting place for those interested in liberal causes.

The couple left the Presbyterian Church soon after marrying and formed the Independent Christian Church, whose members were anti-slavery. The couple left Cleveland and resettled in Boston, Massachusetts in 1855 and, inspired by the sermons of Theodore Parker, joined the Unitarian Church.

== Women's rights and women's clubs ==
After hearing lectures by Ralph Waldo Emerson and Bronson Alcott, Severance became increasingly committed to social justice and peace.

In 1853, after several years of attending and speaking at conventions on behalf of woman's rights, she made her first appearance as a speaker to the general public with a speech to Cleveland's Mercantile Library Association, the first lecture delivered there by a woman. Her subject was "Humanity: A Definition and a Plea", by which she meant that women should be included as part of "humanity." It was a radical idea, but the speech was well received by the audience, and by the Cleveland press. That same year, she presided over the first annual meeting of the Ohio Women's Rights Association.

In 1854, Severance was elected, alongside her husband, to offices for the Fourth National Women's Rights Convention in Cleveland, and testified to the Ohio Legislature in favor of women holding their own inherited property and earnings.

Severance had many other firsts. She was the first woman member of the Parker Fraternity Course, as well as the first woman to give a lecture in Boston before the Lyceum Association.

Shortly after the Civil War, Severance joined the faculty of the Dio Lewis School in Massachusetts, teaching practical ethics. Severance's ethics were tested when a Black girl asked to be admitted to the school and was denied, the school citing parent objections.

Severance helped establish the New England Women's Hospital. She also campaigned with Susan B. Anthony against the inclusion of the word "male" in the Fourteenth Amendment.

In the winter of 1867–1868, Severance established the first woman's club in the United States: the New England Women's Club. Ralph Waldo Emerson, James Freeman Clarke, Octavius Frothingham, and Julia Ward Howe were all invited to speak at the club's first public meeting. In its first years, the Club awarded scholarships, provided educational opportunities for women, backed the kindergarten movement, and campaigned for the appointment of police matrons.

As a result of the rift between suffragists, Severance, along with Lucy Stone and other New England suffragists, founded the American Woman Suffrage Association at a Cleveland convention in 1869.

== Los Angeles and First Unitarian Church of Los Angeles ==
In 1875, for various reasons which included her husband's health and the fact that her two older sons had moved to the West Coast, she relocated with her husband to Los Angeles, buying a tiny home on West Adams Street which they called "Red Roof."

Both Caroline and T. C. Severance had a major impact on the development of Los Angeles. Together they founded the First Unitarian Church of Los Angeles in 1877. T. C. was a founder of the Orphan's Home Society, and the Horticultural Society. Caroline began organizing the women of the rapidly growing community. She brought the kindergarten movement to Los Angeles, serving as president of the city's Free Kindergarten Association, and helped establish the Los Angeles Public Library. In 1878, she founded the first Los Angeles Women's Club. Her interests were far ranging, from woman suffrage to historic preservation [working with Charles Lummis] to world peace. As she grew older, she began to be considered the elder stateswoman of women's rights movements in the city. She also became more radical in her thinking, and was active in the city's Christian socialist movement at the turn of the 20th century. She began to be referred to in the press as "Madame Severance", an indication of her prestige and position in the city.

With two of their children still in the east, Caroline and T. C. Severance had never lost their love of Boston, although they became passionate advocates for their newly adopted home. At first, they returned regularly to the east, and without Caroline's immediate leadership, the Los Angeles Women's Club twice failed. Finally, in 1881, she established a lasting institution, the Friday Morning Club, devoted to cultural and social betterment and civic reform. As reported by Leonard Pitt and Dale Pitt in their book Los Angeles: From A-Z, "[The Friday Morning Club] ran a lending library, maintained an employment bureau, and conducted classes." It became one of the most powerful and prestigious organizations in the city. She was also an active member of the Pacific Coast Women's Press Association.

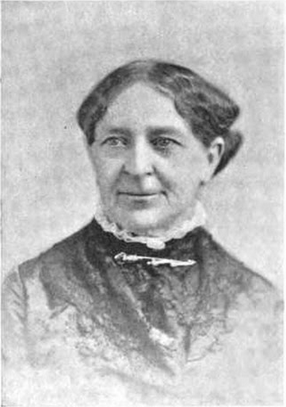
Caroline Severance (1898)

After her husband's death in 1892, Caroline Severance changed the name of her home to "El Nido", which is Spanish for "the nest". Situated in a tree-shaded garden, El Nido was a gathering place for men and women devoted to social change. In 1906, Ella Giles Ruddy wrote in The Mother of Clubs: “For more than thirty years this hospitable home has been a rendezvous for literary people visiting Los Angeles, for leaders in progressive thought . . . in whatever direction it may tend, and for men and women interested also in local or municipal reforms and improvements. The title "Mother of Clubs" has been supplemented by that of the "Ethical Magnet of Southern California ..."

== Women's right to vote in California ==
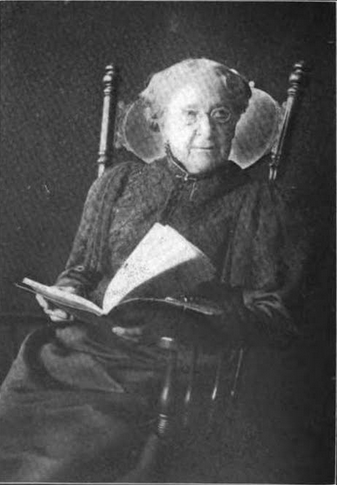
Caroline M. Severance (1903)

In 1911, when Californian women achieved the right to vote, Caroline Severance was lauded as the spiritual leader of the suffrage movement in Southern California, although her advanced age had limited her participation in the campaign. She was featured in every Los Angeles newspaper the day after the election. Although it has often been written that she was the first woman to register to vote in the state, this is not true. In fact, she registered a week after the election, when a registrar came to her home. She did, however, go to the polls the following year to vote in the presidential election, and in 1912, at the age of ninety-two she cast her vote for president, having worked for woman suffrage for more than sixty years. Although she told the press that she had voted for Theodore Roosevelt, it is just as likely that she voted for the Socialist candidate. As Joan Jensen wrote in Women in the Life of Southern California, "By the time she died in 1914 she was firmly committed to a new radicalism. Had she lived on through World War 1, perhaps she would have been classed as a 'parlor Bolshevik,' dangerous pacifist, and pro-laborite, and her home watched carefully by members of the many Loyalty Leagues of Los Angeles."

== Death ==
Severance died on November 10, 1914, at the age of 94.

== Works about Severance ==
- The Mother of Clubs, Baumgardt Publishing Co. 1906
- Caroline Severance, Elwood-Akers, Virginia, iUniverse, 2010
