= List of women's conferences =

This is a chronological list of women's conferences.

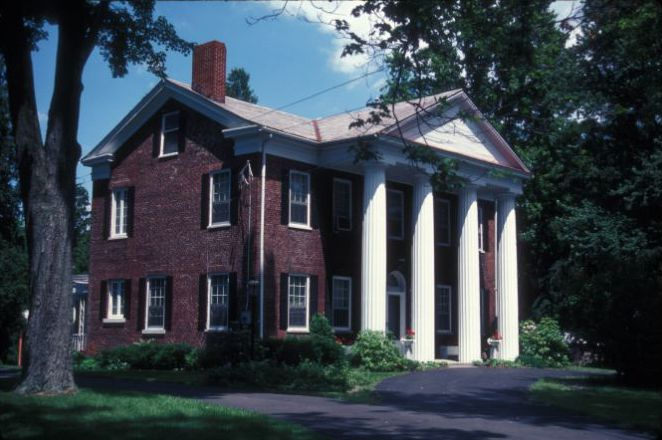
In 1848 a group of women at Hunt House in Waterloo, New York, to plan the first women's conference.

== 19th century ==
- Seneca Falls Convention, 1848, Seneca Falls, New York, first women's rights convention
- Rochester Women's Rights Convention of 1848, Rochester, New York
- National Women's Rights Convention, 1850, Worcester, Massachusetts, first of an annual series
- Ohio Women's Convention at Salem in 1850, Salem, Ohio
- Worcester Women's Rights Convention of 1851, Worcester, Massachusetts, second in the series
- Syracuse Women's Rights Convention of 1852, Syracuse, New York, third in the series
- Cleveland Women's Rights Convention of 1853, Cleveland, Ohio, fourth in the series
- Philadelphia Women's Rights Convention of 1854, Philadelphia, Pennsylvania, fifth in the series
- Cincinnati Women's Rights Convention of 1855, Cincinnati, Ohio, sixth in the series
- New York Women's Rights Convention of 1856, New York, seventh in the series
- New York Women's Rights Convention of 1858, New York, eighth in the series
- New York Women's Rights Convention of 1860, New York, ninth in the series
- First Woman's National Loyal League Convention, 1863, New York, organized to abolish slavery
- New York Women's Rights Convention of 1866, New York, eleventh in the series
- Washington Women's Rights Convention of 1869, Washington, D.C., twelfth in the series
- International Congress of Women, general heading used since 1878 with the International Congress of Women's Rights, Paris
- Jewish Women's Congress, 1893, Chicago, Illinois
- First National Conference of the Colored Women of America, 1895, Boston, Massachusetts

== 20th century ==
- First Conference of the International Woman Suffrage Alliance, 1902, Washington, D.C.
- Second Conference of the International Woman Suffrage Alliance, 1904, Berlin, Germany
- Third Conference of the International Woman Suffrage Alliance, 1906, Copenhagen, Denmark
- International Socialist Women's Conferences, series of conferences beginning in Stuttgart, Germany, in 1907
- Fourth Conference of the International Woman Suffrage Alliance, 1908, Amsterdam
- Fifth Conference of the International Woman Suffrage Alliance, 1909, London
- Second International Socialist Women's Conference, 1910, Copenhagen, Denmark
- Latin American and Caribbean Feminist Encuentros series of on-going conferences to discuss the role of feminism (1981-)
- Sixth Conference of the International Woman Suffrage Alliance, 1911, Stockholm, Sweden
- Seventh Conference of the International Woman Suffrage Alliance, 1913, Budapest, Hungary
- Third International Socialist Women's Conference, 1915, Berne, Switzerland
- Women at the Hague, 1915, international conference in The Hague, Netherlands
- Informal International Socialist Women's Conference, 1917, Stockholm, Sweden
- Congress of Allied Women on War Service, international congress held Paris in August 1918
- Inter-Allied Women's Conference, February–April 1919, parallel conference to the Paris Peace Conference
- International Conference of Women Physicians, New York City, first international conference of women physicians in history
- 1919 International Congress of Working Women, Washington, D.C., 28 delegates from 11 countries
- International Conference of Communist Women, 1920, Moscow, Soviet Russia
- Eighth Conference of the International Woman Suffrage Alliance, 1920, Geneva
- Pan-American Conference of Women, 1922, Baltimore, Maryland
- All India Women's Conference, founded 1927, today over 100,000 members
- International Conference for Women Leaders, biennial conference in Israel, first held 1961
- International Conference of Women Engineers and Scientists, 1964, New York, USA, series of ongoing conferences every 3–4 years
- Connecticut College Black Womanhood Conference, 1969, first of its kind on an American campus
- Conferencia de Mujeres por la Raza, 1971, first national Chicana women's conference
- Women's Caucus for Art, 1972, San Francisco, formed by women in the College Art Association
- World Conference on Women, 1975, Mexico City, first of a series held by the United Nations
- Women's Ordination Conference, 1975, Detroit, Michigan, advocating ordination of women in the Roman Catholic Church
- 1977 National Women's Conference, held in Houston, Texas, with 2,000 delegates and over 15,000 observers
- 1977 Women's National Conference: Minority-Latino-Women
- World Conference on Women, 1980, Copenhagen, Denmark, second in a series held by the United Nations
- First Latin American and Caribbean Feminist Encuentro, 1981, Bogotá, Colombia
- Second Latin American and Caribbean Feminist Encuentro, 1983, Lima, Peru
- World Conference on Women, 1985, Nairobi, Kenya, third in a series held by the United Nations
- Third Latin American and Caribbean Feminist Encuentro, 1985, Bertioga, Brazil
- Fourth Latin American and Caribbean Feminist Encuentro, 1987, Taxco, Mexico
- Central California Women's Conference, founded 1988, Fresno, California
- California Governor & First Lady's Conference on Women, 1985, held in Long Beach, California since 1993
- Fifth Latin American and Caribbean Feminist Encuentro, 1991, San Bernardo, Argentina
- Primer Encuentro de Mujeres Negras de América Latina y El Caribe (First Meeting of Latin American and Caribbean Women Negras), 1992, Santo Domingo, Dominican Republic, 300 representatives from 32 countries
- Sixth Latin American and Caribbean Feminist Encuentro, 1993, Costa del Sol, El Salvador
- World Conference on Women, 1995, Beijing, convened by the United Nations
- Seventh Latin American and Caribbean Feminist Encuentro, 1996, Cartagena, Chile
- Win Conference, annual conference first held in 1998 in Milan, Italy
- Eighth Latin American and Caribbean Feminist Encuentro, 1999, Juan Dolio, Dominican Republic

== 21st century ==
- Ninth Latin American and Caribbean Feminist Encuentro, 2002, Playa Tambor, Costa Rica
- The Women's Conference, renamed in 2004, started as the California Governor & First Lady's Conference on Women in 1985
- Tenth Latin American and Caribbean Feminist Encuentro, 2005, Serra Negra, Brazil
- Eleventh Latin American and Caribbean Feminist Encuentro, 2009, Mexico City, Mexico
- Twelfth Latin American and Caribbean Feminist Encuentro, 2011, Bogotá, Colombia
- Trust Women Conference, annual conference first held in 2012, organized by the Thomson Reuters Foundation
- Thirteenth Latin American and Caribbean Feminist Encuentro, 2014, Lima, Peru
- 50/50 Day, 2017, working towards a more gender-balanced world
- All India Women Activists Conference-Multilingual, 2020, working for exposure of women's hidden talent in every field. Organised by 'MEGAH'All India Women Activists Association, Odisha Branch.

== See also ==
- List of women's organizations
- List of women's rights conventions in the United States
