= List of women's rights conventions in the United States =

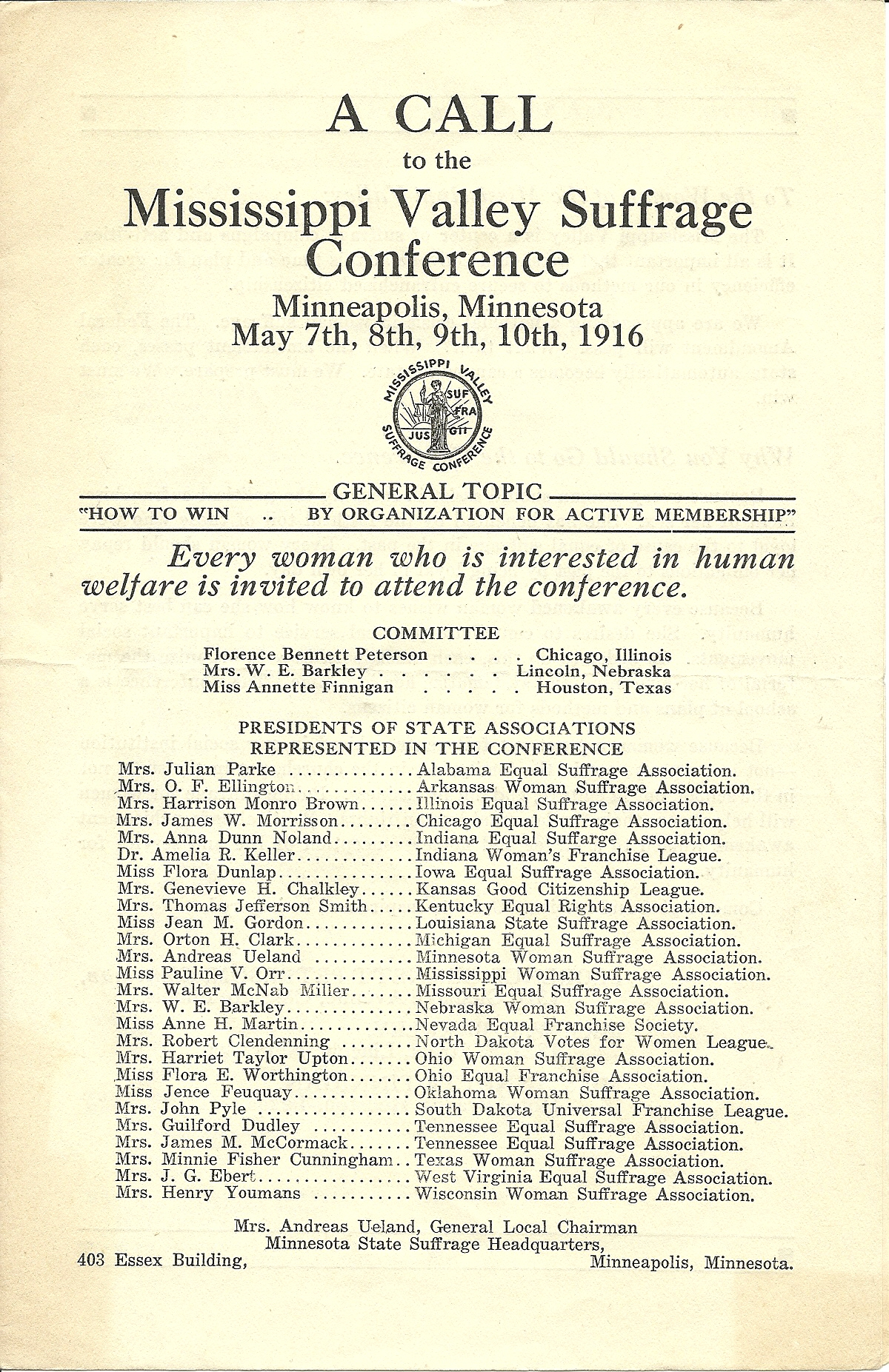
"A Call to the Mississippi Valley Suffrage Conference" in Minneapolis, May 7–10 in 1916

This is a chronological list of women's rights conventions held in the United States. The first convention in the country to focus solely on women's rights was the Seneca Falls Convention held in the summer of 1848 in Seneca Falls, New York. Prior to that, the first abolitionist convention for women was held in New York City in 1837. Elizabeth Cady Stanton is considered the first organized women's rights work to date back to the first National Women's Rights Convention held in 1850.

== 19th century ==
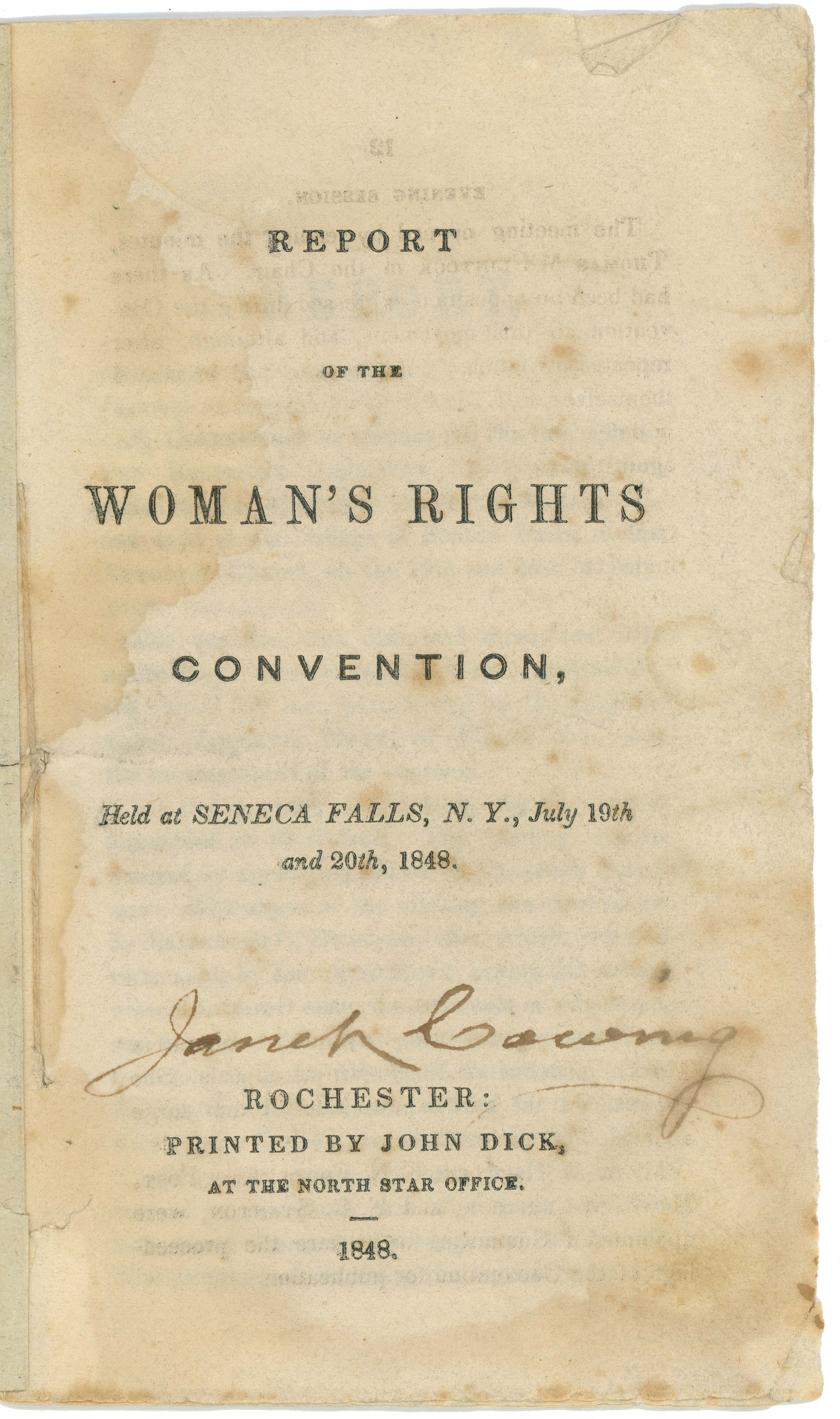
Report of the Woman's Rights Convention in Seneca July 19–20, 1848

=== 1830s ===
1837

- First National Female Anti-Slavery Society Convention is held in New York City.

=== 1840s ===
1848

- July 19–20: Seneca Falls Convention, held in Seneca Falls, New York.
- August 2: Rochester Women's Rights Convention is held in Rochester, New York.

=== 1850s ===
1850

- April 19–20: Ohio Women's Convention at Salem is held in Salem, Ohio.
- October 23–24: First National Woman's Rights Convention, held in Brinley Hall in Worcester, Massachusetts.

1851

- May 28–29: The Ohio Women's Convention at Akron is held in Akron, Ohio and speaker Sojourner Truth gives her 'Ain't I a Woman?' speech.
- October 14–15: First Indiana Woman's Rights Convention is held in Dublin, Indiana.
- October 15–16: Second National Woman's Rights Convention, held in Brinley Hall in Worcester.

1852

- May 26: Ohio Women's Convention at Massillon.
- June 2–3: Pennsylvania Woman's Convention at West Chester.
- September 8–10: Third National Women's Rights Convention, held in Syracuse, New York.

1853

- September 6–7: "Mob Convention" is held in New York City.
- October 6–8: Fourth National Women's Rights Convention, held in Melodean Hall in Cleveland.

1854

- October 18–20: Fifth National Woman's Rights Convention, held in Sansom Street Hall in Philadelphia.

1855

- October 17–18: Sixth National Woman's Rights Convention, held in Nixon's Hall in Cincinnati.

1856

- November 25–26: Seventh National Woman's Rights Convention held in the Broadway Tabernacle in New York City.

1858

- May 13–14: Eighth National Woman's Rights Convention held in Mozart Hall in New York City.

1859

- May 12: Ninth National Woman's Rights Convention held in Mozart Hall in New York City.

=== 1860s ===
1860

- May 10–11: Tenth National Woman's Rights Convention held at The Cooper Union in New York City.
- May 14: First Woman's National Loyal League Convention held at the Church of the Puritans in New York City.

1867

- May 9–10: First annual meeting of the American Equal Rights Association (AERA) is held in New York City.

1869

- November 23: The first Ohio Woman's Suffrage Association (OWSA) convention is held in Cleveland.
- November 24–25: The American Woman Suffrage Association (AWSA) was founded at a convention held in Case Hall in Cleveland.

=== 1870s ===
1873

- October 15–17: First Congress of Women of the Association for the Advancement of Women (AAW) is held at the Union League Theater in New York City.

1874

- November 18–20: The Woman's Christian Temperance Union (WCTU) is founded at their first convention held in Cleveland at the Second Presbyterian Church.

=== 1880s ===
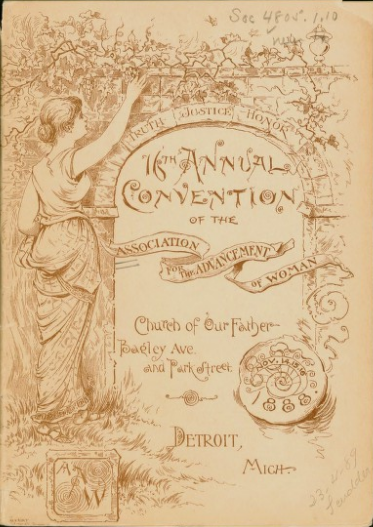
16th Annual Convention of the Association for the Advancement of Women (AAW) in Detroit, 1888

1888

- November 14–16: The 16th Annual Congress of the AAW is held at the Church of Our Father in Detroit.

=== 1890s ===
1890

- February 18: Founding convention of the National American Woman Suffrage Association (NAWSA).

1891

- February 26–March 1: Twenty-Third annual NAWSA convention is held in Albaugh's Opera House in Washington, D.C.

1893

- January 16–19: Twenty-Fifth annual NAWSA convention is held in Washington, D.C.

1895

- July 27–30: The First National Conference of the Colored Women of America is held at Berkeley Hall in Boston.

1896

- November 15–19: First National Jewish Women's Congress is held in Tuxedo Hall in New York City.

1897

- January: NAWSA holds their 29th annual convention in Des Moines, Iowa.

1898

- February 14–19: Thirtieth Annual convention of NAWSA held in Columbia Theater in Washington, D.C.

1899

- April 30–May 6: The thirty-first annual NAWSA convention is held in Grand Rapids, Michigan.
- August 14–16: The second annual convention of the NACW is held in Quinn Chapel in Chicago.

== 20th century ==
=== 1900s ===
1902

- February: First Conference of the International Woman Suffrage Alliance held in Washington, D.C.

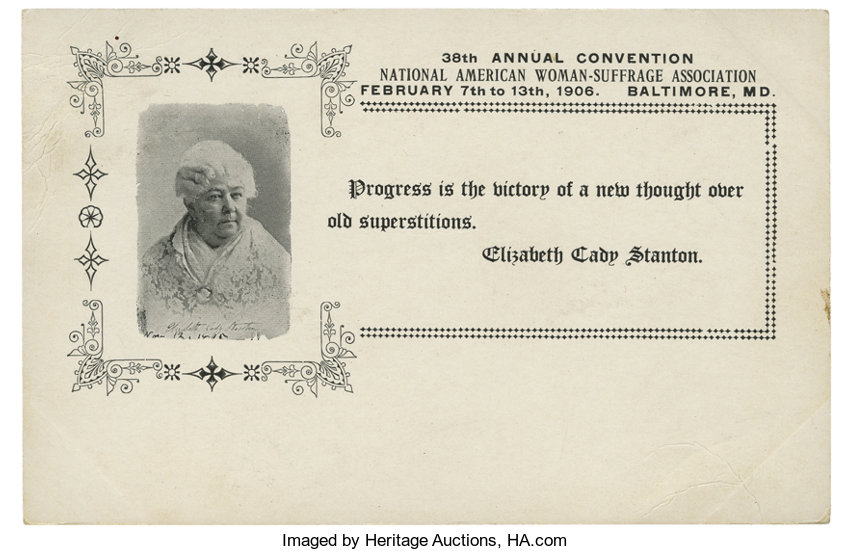
Elizabeth Cady Stanton quote from NAWSA convention in Baltimore in February 1906

1905

- June 29–July 5: The 37th Annual NAWSA convention is held in Portland, Oregon.

1906

- Annual NAWSA Convention is held in Baltimore.

=== 1910s ===
1911

- October 19–25: NAWSA holds their annual convention in Louisville, Kentucky in the De Molay Commandery Hall.

1912

- May: Mississippi Valley Suffrage Conference is held in Chicago and Milwaukee.
- October 15–18: Forty-fourth New York State Suffrage Convention held in Utica, New York.
- November 21–26: Forty-fourth Annual NAWSA conference is held in Philadelphia.
- Midwestern Suffragists' Conference is held in Chicago.

1913

- April 2–4: Mississippi Valley Suffrage Conference is held at the Buckingham Hotel in St. Louis.
- November 12–13: First Southern States Woman Suffrage Conference is held in New Orleans.
- November 29–December 5: Forty-fifth annual NAWSA convention is held in Washington, D.C.

1914

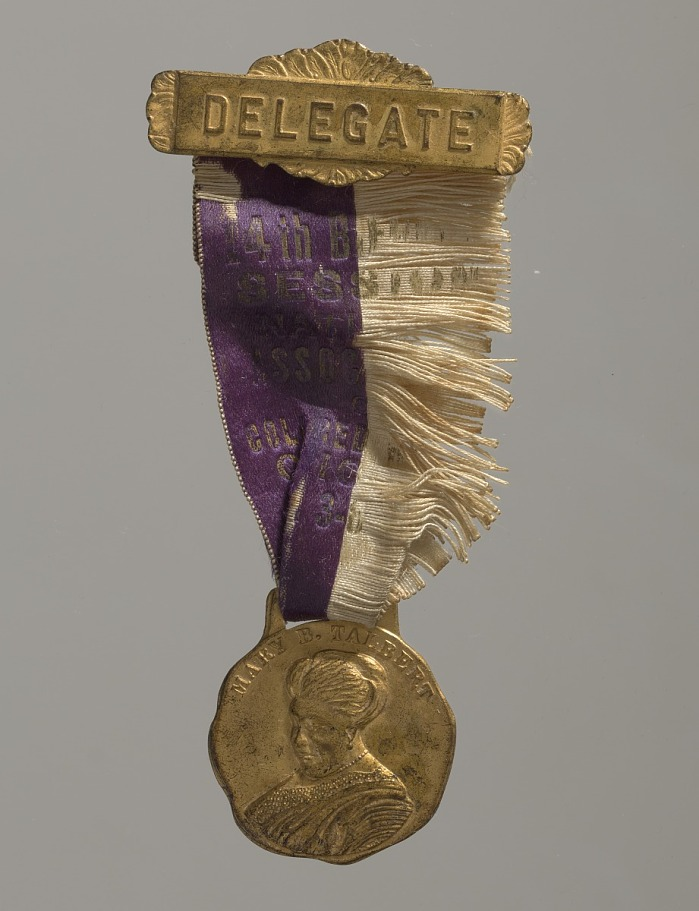
Delegate's badge worn by Mamie Williams at the 1914 National Association of Colored Women's Convention

- March 29–31: Mississippi Valley Suffrage Conference is held in Des Moines, Iowa.
- November 12–17: NAWSA holds its annual convention in Nashville, Tennessee.

1915

- Mississippi Valley Suffrage Conference is held.

1916

- September 6–10: Annual NAWSA Convention is held in Atlantic City, New Jersey.
- May 7–10: Mississippi Valley Suffrage Conference is held in Minneapolis.
- June: The Woman's Party Convention is held in Chicago, where the National Woman's Party (NWP) is formed.

1917

- Mississippi Valley Suffrage Conference is held.

1918

- May 10: National Woman's Party Convention held in Hartford, Connecticut.

=== 1920s ===
1920

- February 12–18: Final NAWSA convention, the "Victory Convention" is held in Chicago.

=== 1960s ===
1969

- April 18–20: Connecticut College Black Womanhood Conference is held.

=== 1970s ===
1971

- May 28–30: La Conferencia de Mujeres por la Raza is held in Houston.

== See also ==
- List of women's conferences
- Feminism in the United States
- Women's suffrage in the United States
