= Autonomous feminism =

Autonomous feminism is a narrowly documented framework that appears particularly when discussing Latin American Feminisms. There is no concrete definition that belongs to Autonomous feminism, but rather a culmination of dispersed ideas. Autonomy in itself refers to "the idea that individuals are entitled to exercise self-determining authority over their own lives." Feminist theories regarding autonomy directly correlates to how systematic gender oppression hinders the abilities of women to be "self-determining" and "self-governing". Moreover, autonomy is a core and evolving concept within feminism and respective feminist identities. The basis of autonomy goes against and aims to demolish gender-based oppressions. Some of these oppressions include lack of abortion rights, gender violence in both the public and private spheres, and the lack of justice for murdered and disappeared relatives (speaking specifically for those in Latin America). Moreover, gender oppression can also take the form of sexual harassment/exploitation, inequalities of opportunity, and gender-based discrimination. In addition, some important autonomous demands include political party independence, choice in the space of whether or not to join male allies, and a criticism of "money king".

Autonomous feminism is a transnational concept that goes hand-in-hand with ideas surrounding anti-racism, concern about the effects of globalization, a counter to compulsory heterosexuality, and a denouncement of the patriarchy. The history of Autonomous Feminism has its roots in Latin American Feminisms throughout the 1970s and 1980s and the resulting activism of this era. In terms of opposition to militant feminists and their participation in left pollical parties, "Autonomy, in this context, was defined as independence from any organization that understood that fight for women's liberation as a secondary goal." This was seen with the rise of neoliberalist thought in the 1990s. There was also another emergence in ideas surrounding autonomous feminism in the 2000s.

== Emergence ==
In terms of Latin American Feminism, 1970s feminist activists used ideology surrounding the public and private spheres of labor to connect how authoritarian regimes were rooted in patriarchal/gender-based oppression. Moreover, during this period, motherhood became a political category as women mobilized against state repression and the disappearance of their missing and murdered relatives. This was seen through the mobilization of groups like the Mothers of the Plaza de Mayo and The CoMadres. Abortion was a prominent topic for debate during this time period as well. In 1976, autonomous groups like El Movimiento Nacional de Mujeres, fought to decriminalize abortion. They mobilized one of the first congresses on the issue of abortion and stood by the statement that pregnancy or the end of one is a woman's decision that should be attainable through all public health institutions. The 1970s was a time when women began to gain more gendered consciousness and challenge the patriarchy within their geopolitical climate and demand social change.

== Encuentros ==
The First Encuentro was held in Bogota, Colombia in 1981 over the course of four days. The Encuentros were debate forums regarding the feminist movement and feminist politics across Latin America and the Caribbean. The participants of the first Encuentro aimed to design a road for autonomous politics. This included a focus on equal pay, ending the double workday, providing the right to safe abortion, and the right of motherhood as a choice.

The Second Encuentro (1983) in Lima, Peru highlighted topics like the patriarchy regarding its role in systemic sexism as well as its ties to capitalism. Lesbian visibility was significant in this Encuentro and allowed heterosexual feminists to confront their homophobia. The topic of racism was also key here.

The Encuentros documented growth of the ideas of Autonomous Feminism and reflected overarching pushes for social justice and feminist goals.

== Neoliberalism ==
Gender equality and anti-discrimination policies within neoliberalism were key for Latin American Feminists during the 1990s. Moreover, with the rise of neoliberalism, the idea of an autonomous individual in terms of individualism placed people in charge of their own survival and development which inherently relied on the market economy. With this came the institutionalization of the feminist movement and a move away from the radical ideas about the patriarchy, democratization, and militarism. Moreover, Latin American Feminist Autonomy "has been used to avoid co-option by actors like political parties, NGOs, the state, and funding agencies." Moreover, The Seventh Encuentro in 1996 also led to the creation of the first autonomous-feminist declaration: Permanencia Voluntaria en la Utopia. The push for the inclusion of marginal, othered groups like Afro-Latinx, Indigenous and Lesbian women was reflected in The Eighth Encuentro held in 1999 in Juan Dolio, Dominican Republic. Anti-neoliberal discourse was also added to Latin American feminisms during this time in addition to decolonial and anti-patriarchal discussions.

== Autonomous Feminist Encounter ==
In 2009, the Autonomous Feminist Encounter was held in Mexico City, Mexico where they produced a statement to challenge the developing feminist community. The statement acknowledges the "multiplicity of experiences and knowledges" of the feminist community and pays tribute and recognition to the radical feminists of the 1970s that aided in raising autonomous consciousness. Important groups mentioned in terms of autonomous knowledge production include Las Complices, Movimiento Feminista Autonomo, Feminismo Popular de Chile, Mujeres Creando de Bolivia, and Atem de Argentina. For instance, Mujeres Creando mobilized for over a hundred days to bring together about 15,000 usury victims from NGOs and banks. This statement also includes its own definition of Autonomous Feminism as, "...an ethical, political, and transformative proposal of the whole world, by women, for women, and for all humanity." Furthermore, the statement goes on to denounce militarization, the consequences of neoliberalism, capitalism, patriarchy and centers Autonomous Feminism as counter-hegemonic and rejecting normalization.

== Nicaragua ==
The success of the Nicaraguan Revolution in the late 1970s played a significant role in advocating for women's rights in Nicaragua. These included responsible parenthood, marriage and divorce, recognition of stable unions, child care for mothers, established equal protection for children born out of wedlock, and maternity leave for working mothers. The move towards autonomous feminism began here in the early 1990s including the creation of the Autonomous Women's Movement (MAM) in 1991. MAM distanced itself from the FSLN and Chamorro government in 1992 with its signature on the declaration of autonomy. Moreover, as Arnoldo Aleman of the Liberal Alliance took victory over the FSLN in 1996, women's groups focused on asserting anti-militarist agendas that stood against gender hierarchy. During this time feminists continued to harbor down on Sandinism which was expressed in the "politicisation of gender violence." After the return of the FSLN, the government raided the offices of MAM in 2008 and accused them of "illegally promoting abortion and engaging in illegal financial dealings." For MAM, the FSLN strayed from their once pro-feminist demands and became hostile as they began to align with religious ideologies and regressive Catholicism.

== Venezuela ==
Neoliberalism as a whole has led to the feminization of poverty, however, this has also led to the rise of feminization of political resistance and social transformation in Venezuela. The dialogue for this framework in terms of the feminist struggle in Venezuela has aided in the inclusion of Article 88 of the Bolivarian Constitution that took place in 1999. The article recognized "housework as producing social benefits and economic value." Venezuela is the only country in the world to recognize this. Furthermore, poverty was a main issue for feminists in Venezuela during the 1990s. A reported 65 percent of citizens lived in poverty including highly concentrated feminized poverty in shanty towns like La Vega. Autonomous Marxist Feminist highlights and challenges the correlation between patriarchy and capitalism.

== Indigenous autonomy ==
The Zapatista movement played a critical role for indigenous women to mobilize as political figures in Mexico. Moreover, organizations like the National Coordinating Committee of Indigenous Women (CONAMI) aided in providing indigenous women with leadership training and training on how to coordinate at a sub-national level. On the other hand autonomous organizations like AMMOR discussed the conditions women peasants. They went on the criticize the National Union of Autonomous Regional Organizations (UNORCA), "lack of land titles prevented them [indigenous women] from gaining access to credit and programs and reinforced the sexual division of labor." Key pushes for indigenous autonomy included the right to work and receive a fair salary, to live without violence, the right to choose pregnancy and a partner, education, and the right to obtain leadership positions. Moreover, ANIPA, CNI, and UCIZONI in Oaxaca are other key indigenous led autonomous organizations.
