= The 2012 Project =

- Founder: Mary Hughes
- Type: 501(c)(3)
- Purpose: Increasing the number of women in state and federal office in the 2012 election
- Location: Palo Alto, CA, USA
- Website: http://www.the2012project.us/

The 2012 Project is a nonpartisan national campaign of the Center for American Women and Politics (CAWP) at Rutgers University. The project's goal is to identify and engage accomplished women to run for the United States Congress and state legislatures following reapportionment and redistricting within each state. U.S. Census data collected every 10 years include information on population shifts across the nation and are used to redraw congressional and state legislative districts resulting in new and open legislative seats. This work is done in order to comply with the 1965 Voting Rights Act and the "one person, one vote" principle. As of the 2010 Census, women made up 50.8% of the population. In terms of congressional and legislative seats, women currently make up 17% of the U.S. Senate and 16.8% of the U.S. House of Representatives. They make up a slightly larger percentage of the state legislatures at 23.6%. The aim of The 2012 Project is to increase the number of women running for state legislative and congressional office in 2012.

== Background ==
The 2012 Project was established by Mary Hughes, a political strategist and co-founder of the San Francisco-based political consulting firm, Staton and Hughes, now known as Hughes & Co, in Palo Alto, California. Hughes has been an adviser to women candidates running for office at all levels of government for more than two decades.

The idea for the 2012 Project came about after Hughes attended a June 2006 summit at the Center for American Women and Politics where scholars and activists explored the underlying causes for the decline in the number of women in political office.

The 2012 Project is a campaign of the Center for American Women and Politics, led by Debbie Walsh. The 2012 Project aims to identify and support women not previously active in politics to run for office at any level. The goal is to increase female political representation at the state and federal levels. The number of women in state legislatures dropped by more than 60 as a result of the 2010 elections. Prior to the 2011 special election victories of Kathy Hochul and Janice Hahn to the U.S. House of Representatives, the number of women serving in the 112th Congress was 89, down one from the 2010 total, representing the first drop in female Congressional representation since the 96th Congress in 1979. This does not include the three women delegates from Guam, The Virgin Islands, and Washington, DC. According to the Inter-Parliamentary Union, the United States ranks 70th out of more than 134 countries in the world with respect to political gender. The Global Gender Gap Report published in 2010 by the World Economic Forum ranks the United States as 40th out of 134 countries in terms of gender equality in political empowerment.

=== Research ===
Research has shown that women tend to wait longer to run for political office and are recruited less often than men by major political parties. Women, in general, are less likely to self-nominate; they often do not run for political office unless asked to do so. The aim of The 2012 Project is to ask women over the age of 45 from various industries, such as finance, small business and science, to consider running for office.

Every decade, census data is used to redraw congressional and state legislative districts to ensure that constituents are equally represented under the 1965 Voting Rights Act. Redistricting results in higher numbers of new and open seats across the country. Research has shown that women have a greater success in districts with open seats, particularly when organizations identify and recruit women to run for office. CAWP research has shown that women, like men, who run against incumbents are rarely successful. When women challenged incumbents, one out of 37 challengers was successful in 1990, two of 41 challengers in 1992, and three of 52 challengers in 1994. When women ran for open seats in the same election years, three of eight women won in 1990, 22 of 39 women in 1992, and eight of 16 women in 1994. As of December 21, 2010, Election Data Services projects that 18 states will see changes in the sizes of their congressional delegations in the 2012 elections. Illinois, Iowa, Louisiana, Massachusetts, Michigan, Missouri, New Jersey, and Pennsylvania are expected to lose one seat while New York and Ohio are expected to lose two seats. Arizona, Georgia, Nevada, South Carolina, Utah and Washington are expected to gain one seat, while Florida is expected to gain two seats, and Texas is expected to gain four seats.

Study shows although women's opportunities for elective office have significant progress, women remain far from reaching parity with men in elective office.

=== Process ===
The 2012 Project works has created a faculty of former elected women across the country to reach out to educate women, particularly those from occupations underrepresented in government, about the political opportunities available. They attend conferences and meetings of various organizations to encourage women who have already succeeded in other professional arenas to enter the political sphere. However, the 2012 Project does not run the campaigns for these women. The 2012 Project identifies women who are interested in becoming candidates and links them to training programs, think tanks and political parties in their states. The campaign also reaches women online via webinars and social media.

=== Supporters ===
The 2012 Project has three groups of supporters: allies, faculty and funders. Allies are women's organizations or progressive organizations that are interested in promoting equal representation in government. Examples of allies include Democracy for America; Emerge America; EMILY'S List; MANA, A National Latina Organization; the National Congress of Black Women; the National Republican Women's Network; the Republican Majority for Choice; the Veterans Campaign; and The White House Project. Allies support the campaign by disseminating information to their membership about the aims of the 2012 Project and by allowing it to present at annual conferences or summits organized by these groups. The 2012 Project has presented at conferences such as MacWorld 2011, Vision 2020 as well as groups such as the Executive Women of the State Department in Washington, D.C., the American Geophysical Union, the Women's Council of Realtors, Rachel's Network, and the American Medical Women's Association. Faculty are former elected officials who support the project by appearing at events to educate women about the challenges and rewards of running for political office. Funders are individuals and organizations who have contributed financially to the Project as it expands nationally.

== Center for American Women and Politics ==
The Center for American Women and Politics is an entity of the Eagleton Institute of Politics at Rutgers University, specializing in scholarly research, educational programs, public information, and outreach to women elected officials, focusing on American women's participation in electoral politics.
