= Chriselle Martinez =

American politician

Member-elect of the New Mexico House of Representatives from the 57th district
- Assuming office January 2027
- Succeeding: Catherine Cullen

Personal details
- Party: Democratic

Chriselle Martinez is an American politician. A member of the Democratic Party, she is the member-elect for the 57th district of the New Mexico House of Representatives.

Since 2025, Martinez is the director of community relations for the Albuquerque chapter of MANA, A National Latina Organization.
