= Connecticut College Black Womanhood Conference =

1969 conference in Connecticut, US

The Connecticut College Black Womanhood Conference was a three-day conference in 1969 to celebrate the roles of Black women in numerous professional spheres, including education, medicine, fine arts, and politics. It is thought to be the first conference of its kind to occur on an American college campus.

== History ==
The Class of 1931 had the first Black student to enroll and graduate from Connecticut College, followed by another student in the Class of 1949 who did not graduate. During the 1950s, six Black students were present at the College, but the classes of 1959 to 1967 were made up of only white students. However, in 1968, ten Black students enrolled in the College. This change prompted administrative efforts to further recruit underrepresented groups into the college. In the same year, the first Afro-American Society at Connecticut College was founded, simultaneous to the admission of men into the previously all-women's college.

After a year of planning, the Black Womanhood Conference was set to take place on April 18–20, 1969, with the aid of Sue Johnson, executive coordinator, and Dr. Mabel Smythe, Advisory Board and Board of Trustees member. Student leader Beverly Phillips described the purpose of the conference in the following statement: "Being Black, we feel that the Black contribution to America has been slighted. Being Black women, we have tried to bring distinguished Black women of many fields to this campus, to talk about what it is to be Black in this society and to discuss the Black experience as it relates to their individual professions."

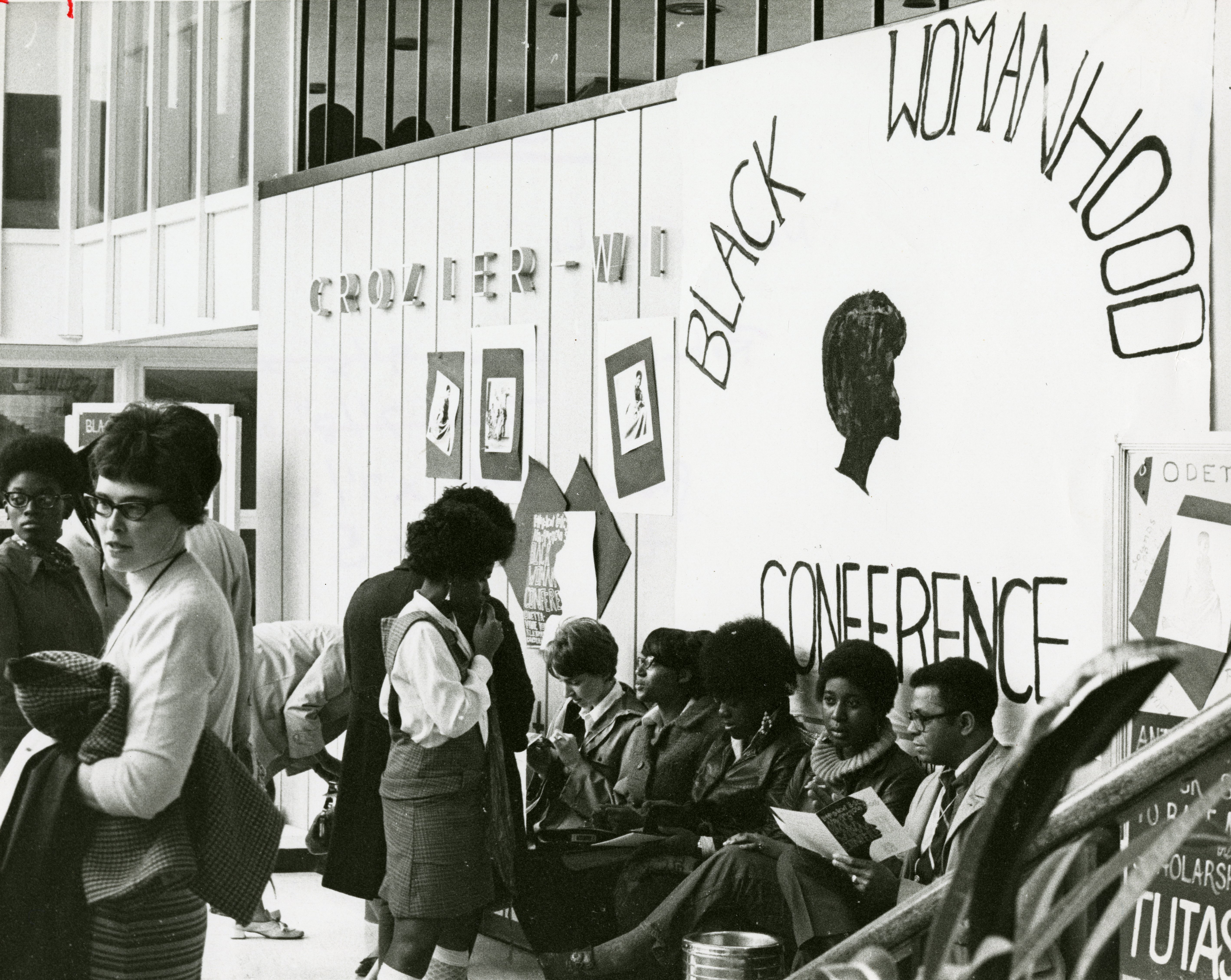
Students of Connecticut College gather in the student center, Crozier-Williams, for the first Black Womanhood Conference.

== Conference ==
=== Keynote address ===
Vinie Burrows, star of the one-woman, Off-Broadway production Walk Together, Children, performed a speech that integrated excerpts from Black American literature in order to convey the experiences of Black women, asserting that "black womanhood is singularly featured in the works of black poets and writers."

=== Seminars ===
Seminars led by prominent Black woman figures representing a wide range of professional interests took place in the dormitory common rooms. Guest speakers included Jewel Plummer Cobb, a professor of biology at Sarah Lawrence College, cancer researcher, and upcoming Dean of the College at Connecticut College; Dr. Alyce Gullatee, a Washington, D.C., psychiatrist and Emmy-award nominee for NBC special The Disabled Mind; Ruth Wilson, an elementary school teacher in New Haven; the Honorable Constance Baker Motley, a judge in the federal district court for the Southern District of New York; Ruth Inge Hardison, sculptor of Black historical figures; Joyce Mitchell Cook, philosophy professor at Bryn Mawr College; Rachel Robinson, medical researcher and wife of professional baseball player Jackie Robinson; Dr. Mabel Smythe, United States Ambassador and Connecticut College Board of Trustees member; June Meyer, a poet, author of “WHO LOOK AT ME? (1969) and visiting professor the semester before the conference took place; Dean Bernice Miller of Planning at Jackson College and Mrs. William Wilson, a teacher at the Katherine Brennan School in New Haven both discussed Black women in education and Mrs. Margaret Burroughs art teacher at DuSable High School in Chicago and author of Did you Feed my Cow? Street games, chants, and rhymes (1969).

=== Performances ===
As the opening event of the conference, as well as to represent Black women's influence in the fine arts, husband-and-wife duo Pearl Primus and Percival Borde, founders of a touring Afro-Caribbean dance company, performed West Indian and African dance. As a continuation of the theme of Black women in the arts, Saturday night closed with a performance by singer-songwriter and activist Odetta.

=== Closing address ===
Eleanor Holmes Norton, assistant legal director of American Civil Liberties Union and future Congresswoman, delivered a concluding address that dealt with the role of Black women in American and differences between white and Black families. Inspired by the work of Gwendolyn Brooks, Norton explored how the nuanced experiences of Black women and their families distinguish them from white women and families; this difference can enable the establishment of egalitarian ideals within Black family structures and the professional world.

== Legacy ==
The conference is believed to be the first of its kind to occur on an American college campus. This was a significant accomplishment given the conference's historical proximity to the Civil Rights Movement, as well as the majority of white women on Connecticut College's campus. Proceeds collected from the conference were donated to a Black student scholarship fund in order to build upon mission of the College to foster admission of underrepresented groups.

Connecticut College’s Black Womanhood Conference was recreated and took place on April 2, 2017. The conference was renamed, “Black Woman’s Conference Resisting Invisibility Restoring our minds, bodies, and communities. The conference took place in the Crozier Williams Student Center. The conference took place in one day from 10am-4pm with a combination of different performances and lectures conducted by Black women some who work at Connecticut college and some who do not. The conference was sponsored by a multitude of college offices and departments: Africana Studies Steering Committee, CCSRE (Center for Critical Study of Race and Ethnicity), Gender and Women’s Studies, Holleran Center, Community Partnerships, Womxn’s Center, President Bergeron, DIEI (Division of Equity and Inclusion), Dean of the College and SGA (Student Government Association).

Some of the speakers of the conference were Bryana White Ph.D. the Assistant Director of Student counseling services, focusing on identity-based issues. Henryatta Ballah, the assistant professor of History, Terry-Ann Craigie and Yazmin Watkins. Some of the sessions were about Black natural hair and the importance of it within the community, mental health and self-care.

Shameesha Pryor (class of 2017), was one of the people who started the efforts to recreate this conference.
