= Rachel Navarro =

Counseling psychologist

- Occupations: Professor of Counseling Psychology, University of North Dakota
- Awards: 2013 APA Henry Tomes Award; 2012 National Latinx Psychological Association Distinguished Professional Early Career Award

Academic background
- Education: University of Wisconsin–Eau Claire; University of Wisconsin–Madison; University of Missouri, Columbia

Academic work
- Institutions: University of North Dakota

Rachel L. Navarro is a licensed counseling psychologist known for her work in the field of multicultural vocational psychology, focusing on the experience and career goals of Latinas in STEM fields (Science, Technology, Engineering, and Mathematics). She is Professor of Counseling Psychology, Education, and Health and Behavior and Associate Dean for Research and Faculty Development at the University of North Dakota.

Navarro received the American Psychological Association (APA) Office of Ethnic Minority Affairs Henry Tomes Award for Significant Contributions to the Advancement of Ethnic Minority Psychology in 2013. She also received the Distinguished Professional Early Career Award from the National Latinx Psychological Association in 2012. Other awards include the Kenneth and Mamie Clark Award for Outstanding Contribution to the Professional Development of Ethnic Minority Graduate Students, given by the American Psychological Association of Graduate Students in 2010.

Navarro is a Fellow of the Society of Counseling Psychology (APA, Division 17).

== Biography ==
Navarro was born and raised in Mound, Minnesota. Her father is Puerto Rican and her mother is Czechoslovak-Irish.

Navarro earned her B.A. in psychology with a concentration in Women Studies at the University of Wisconsin–Eau Claire in 1996. Four years later, Navarro earned her Masters of Science in Counseling with a concentration in College Student Development at the University of Wisconsin–Madison. In 2005, she earned her APA-accredited Doctor of Philosophy in Counseling Psychology from the University of Missouri, Columbia. In her doctoral research, Navarro used structural equation modeling to explore how socio-contextual and socio-cognitive variables influence Mexican American middle school students' goal intentions in mathematics and science. Her dissertation was conducted under the supervision of Roger L. Worthington and Lisa Y. Flores, with support from a Donald E. Super Fellowship given by the Society of Counseling Psychology to doctoral students conducting research related to career development. Her work was honored in 2004 with the Cynthia de las Fuentes Dissertation Award, given by the National Latinx Psychological Association. Navarro completed her post-graduate internship at the University of Florida Counseling Center.

Before joining the faculty of the University of North Dakota in 2010, Navarro held faculty positions at Teachers College, Columbia University (2005–2006) and at New Mexico State University (2006–2010).

== Research ==
Navarro's research program examines college students' academic and career development from a multicultural counseling perspective. One of her collaborative projects with Lisa Flores focuses on minority persistence in engineering, and has been supported by grants from the National Science Foundation. The project compares white and Latina women's rates of contentment and satisfaction in the field of engineering, using a modified version of social cognitive career theory. The researchers aim to document retention of women in engineering by tracking how social, cognitive, environmental, and cultural factors impact persistence of white and Latina women in the field of engineering over time.
