= Ochy Curiel =

Dominican feminist and writer

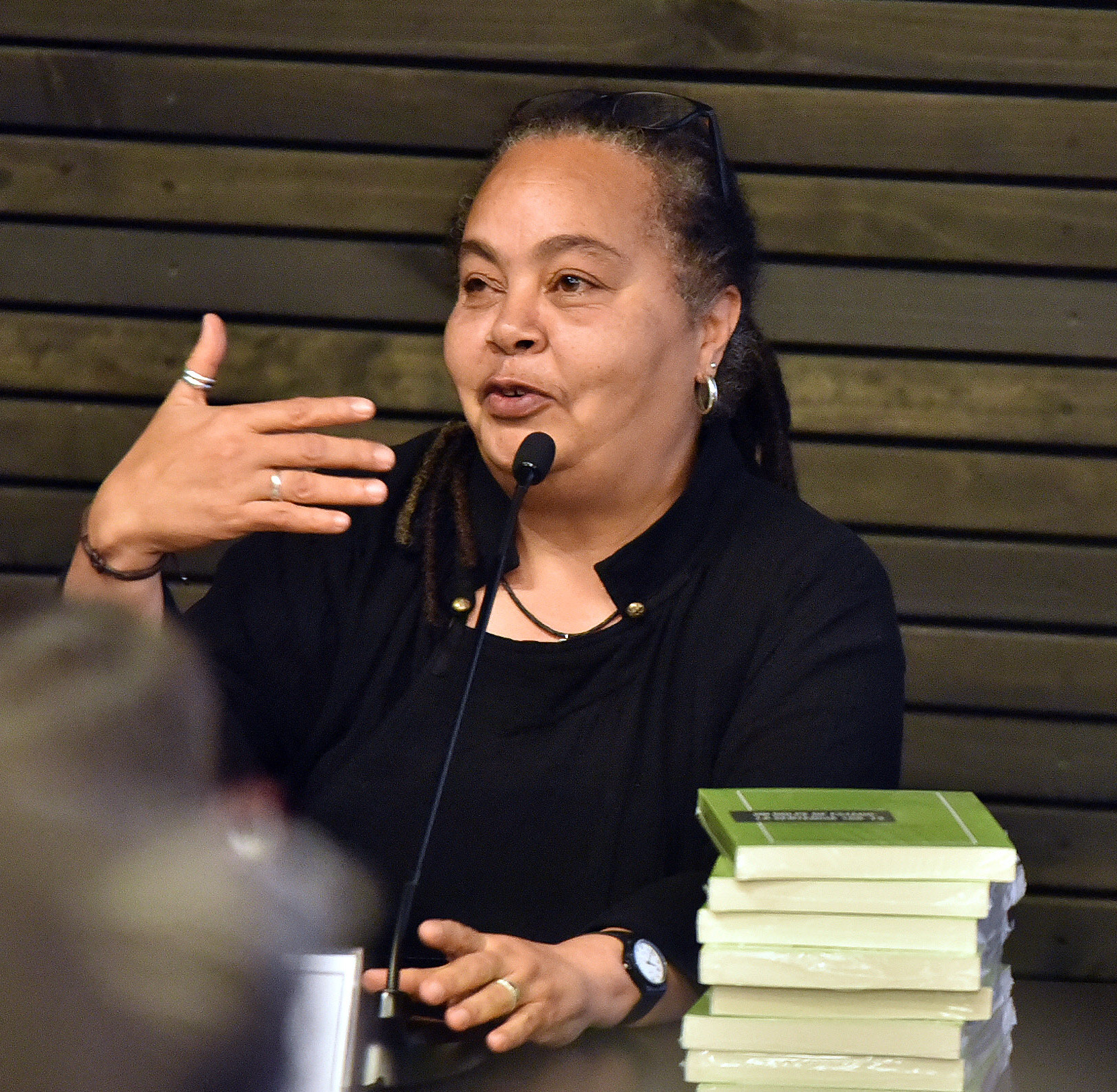
- Born: Rosa Inés Curiel Pichardo; 15 March 1963 (age 62); Santiago, Dominican Republic
- Occupations: academic, activist
- Years active: 1985–present
- Known for: decolonial feminist lesbian theory

Rosa Inés Curiel Pichardo (born 1963), better known as Ochy Curiel, is an Afro-Dominican feminist academic, singer and social anthropologist. She is known for helping to establish the Afro-Caribbean women's movement and maintaining that lesbianism is neither an identity, orientation nor sexual preference, but rather a political position. She is one of the most prominent feminist scholars in Latin America and the Caribbean.

== Early years and education ==
Rosa Inés Curiel Pichardo was born on 15 March 1963, in Santiago, Dominican Republic, and attended primary school at the Women's Polytechnic Our Lady of Mercy. After graduating, she enrolled at the Pontificia Universidad Católica Madre y Maestra and obtained a bachelor's degree in Social Work.

== Feminism and racism ==
In the late 1980s, she began working at the Dominican Center for Education Studies in Santo Domingo and co-founded Ce-mujer, a women's NGO and advisory group. At the time, there was a nascent feminist movement in the Dominican Republic, which was more closely tied to Latin American identification than to Afro-Caribbean, despite the fact that the country was predominantly Afro-Dominican. It also was more class-focused, in that the movement looked more at the problems of the middle class. Each NGO operated as an autonomous organization, rather than collectively. Efforts were small grassroots activist organizations addressing the needs of individual communities or groups, but two voices, Curiel and Sergia Galvan began pressing for broader discussions on women's issues which included racism and sexism. It was a challenging discussion in the Dominican Republic where the social lens typically classifies Haitians as black and Dominicans as mestizo or mulatto.

"We are so invisibilized as citizens that we don't even appear as a sector in statistical data, because the data is not segregated by ethnic composition, which creates the assumption of the inexistence of our race."

Beginning in the early 1990s, it became apparent that collectivism and nesting were effective in combating intersections of discrimination and that by banding together, NGOs might jointly combat racism and misogyny. Curiel joined the board of an organization called Casa por la Identidad de las Mujeres Afro (House of Women with African Identity), which aimed to combat the dual-discrimination faced by Afro-Dominican women. The identity politics that Curiel embraced was counter to the governmental aim of creating a homogeneous society, but one that she felt was pivotal. Without embracing their blackness, racism could always be denied. But by claiming their solidarity in attaining socioeconomic, political and cultural parity the women of Identidad were able to create a collective voice. Soon afterwards, Curiel joined regional organizations such as Afro-latino-American Women and the Afro-Caribbean Network and began planning the Primer Encuentro de Mujeres Negras de América Latina y El Caribe (First Meeting of Black Women of Latin America and the Caribbean). The conference, held in Santo Domingo between 19 and 25 July 1992, brought together over 300 participants from 32 countries to discuss how systemic bias has obscured the accomplishments of black women and develop strategies to improve their lives.

== Lesbianism ==
Curiel soon began to recognize that her lesbianism was another part of the equation. Though there had been lesbians in the Dominican feminist movement, she recognized that their aspirations could not be transformed into political goals without openness. By 1996, her ideas had congealed into what she called "feminist lesbianism". Curiel's theory sets forth the idea that lesbianism is neither an identity, orientation nor sexual preference, but rather a political position, which strives to counterbalance the heteronormativity of laws, media, religion, and other aspects of society. She argues that heterosexuality has erased women's autonomy and that it is only through reclaiming their non-subservient status and daring to assert that men are not needed for their survival, that women will reclaim their freedom. Curiel continued teaching and organizing conferences in the Dominican Republic until 2001.

== Move to Mexico ==
Soon thereafter, Curiel moved to Mexico, where she began lecturing at the Universidad Autónoma del Estado de Hidalgo. She was one of the participants in the first lesbian march held in Mexico in 2003. The following year, she went to Europe and was a featured musician at the Teddy Awards in Berlin. While she was there, she met with Jules Falquet from France and Sabine Masson from Switzerland, and they discussed how western feminist theorists and works were shaping feminist discourse. Curiel felt that part of the discussion was missing because Latin American women's voices were not heard in Europe while some European works were not available to Latinas because of language variances. They worked together on a series of articles to bridge this gap in feminist theory.

== Move to Colombia ==
In 2006, Curiel moved to Colombia, where she began teaching two courses at the National University of Colombia (UNC), one on Racism and Patriarchy, the other on Lesbian Feminism. Continuing her own studies, Curiel earned a master's degree in social anthropology in Bogotá from UNC in 2010 and began serving as Coordinator of the graduate curriculum for Gender Studies. She has shown interest in decolonial theory, which evaluates not just the ending of colonization, but how entrenched cultural ideas concerning classism, heterosexism and racism can be deconstructed. Among the scholars who have influenced her work are several indigenous women: the Bolivian Julieta Paredes, founder of Mujeres Creando; Yuderkys Espinosa from the Dominican Republic, who evaluates the intersection of feminism and decolonization; Breny Mendoza, who critiques transnational feminism for its failure to provide non-colonizing alternatives; the Guatemalan feminist Aura Cumes, who evaluates patriarchy, colonization, indigenous intersections of feminism; and even male theorists, such as Anibal Quijano. As she became more immersed in indigenous and African theory and culture, Curiel recognized that pre-colonial societies, such and the Inca and Aztec along with those in Kenya, South Africa and others, had differing social constructs centering on community strength, rather than top-down power arrangements. She began moving away from transnational feminism in an attempt to understand the underlying causes of oppression. For Curiel, recognizing that poor black women exist and have faced bias, is not sufficient nor is recognition that they have some commonalities with other women. Those who have privilege have the freedom to question their identity in ways that others do not. Curiel posits that until one examines privilege and what is important to specific groups, one cannot fully understand exploitation.

Curiel has lectured throughout Latin America, North America and Europe discussing her various theories. She has been a featured lecturer at many conferences and universities and is considered one of the most prominent Latin American-Caribbean feminist scholars. She has published a wide body of work on Négritude and feminist theories.

== Selected works ==
- Curiel, Ochy (October 1998). "Las mujeres afrodominicanas: interrelacion de las variables genero etnia y clase. una visión feminista". Ciencia y Sociedad (in Spanish). 23 (4). República Dominicana: Instituto Tecnologico de Santodomingo: 459–470. doi:10.22206/cys.1998.v23i4.pp459-70. ISSN 0378-7680. OCLC 926127727.
- Curiel, Ochy (August 1999). "Pour un féminisme qui articule race, classe, sexe et sexualité: Interview avec Ochy Curiel". Nouvelles Questions Féministes (in French). 20 (3). Lausanne, Switzerland: Editions Antipodes: 39–62. ISSN 0248-4951. OCLC 5547361249.
- Curiel, Ochy (January 2002). "La lutte politique des femmes face aux nouvelles formes de racisme. Vers une analyse de nos stratégies". Nouvelles Questions Féministes (in French). 21 (3). Lausanne, Switzerland: Editions Antipodes: 84–103. doi:10.3917/nqf.213.0084. ISSN 0248-4951. OCLC 5547372967.
- Curiel, Ochy; Falquet, Jules, eds. (2005). El Patriarcado al Desnudo. Tres Feministas Materialistas: Colette Guillaumin, Paola Tabet, Nicole Claude Mathieu (PDF) (in Spanish). Buenos Aires, Argentina: Brecha Lésbica. Archived from the original (PDF) on 2017-02-04.
- Curiel, Ochy; Falquet, Jules; Masson, Sabine (2005). Féminismes dissidents en Amérique latine et aux Caraïbes (in French). Lausanne, Switzerland: Éditions Antipodes. ISBN 978-2-940-14663-5.
- Curiel, Ochy; Falquet, Jules, eds. (2006). De la cama a la calle: perspectivas teóricas lésbico-feministas (in Spanish). Bogotá, Colombia: Brecha Lésbica/Ediciones Antropos. ISBN 978-958-9307-61-8.
- Curiel, Ochy (April 2007). "Critica poscolonial desde las practicas politicas del feminismo antirracista". Nómadas (in Spanish) (26). Bogotá, Colombia: Fundacion Universidad Central: 92–101. OCLC 820174627.
- Curiel, Ochy (October 2007). "Critique postcoloniale et pratiques politiques du féminisme antiraciste". Mouvements: Sociétés, Politique, Culture (in French). 51 (3). Paris, France: La Découverte: 119–129. doi:10.3917/mouv.051.0119. ISSN 1291-6412. OCLC 5530936943.
- Curiel, Ochy (2008). "Superando la interseccionalidad de categorías por la construcción de un proyecto político feminista radical. Reflexiones en torno a las estrategias políticas de las mujeres afrodescendientes". In Wade, Peter; Giraldo, Fernando Urrea; Viveros, Mara (eds.). Raza, etnicidad y sexualidades: ciudadanía y multiculturalismo en América Latina (in Spanish). Bogotá, Colombia: Universidad Nacional de Colombia, Facultad de Ciencias Humanas, Instituto CES, Escuela de Estudios de Género. ISBN 978-958-8063-60-7.
- Curiel, Ochy (2009). "Las políticas de las identidades y sus dilemas: esencialismo vs antiesencialismo". In González, Diana Carrillo; Rengifo, Nelson Santiago Patarroyo (eds.). Derecho, interculturalidad y resistencia étnica (in Spanish). Bogotá, Colombia: Universidad Nacional de Colombia, Sede Bogotá, Instituto Unidad de Investigaciones Jurídico-Sociales Gerardo Molina. ISBN 978-958-719-276-6.
