= Women's International Networking Conference =

International women's networking conference

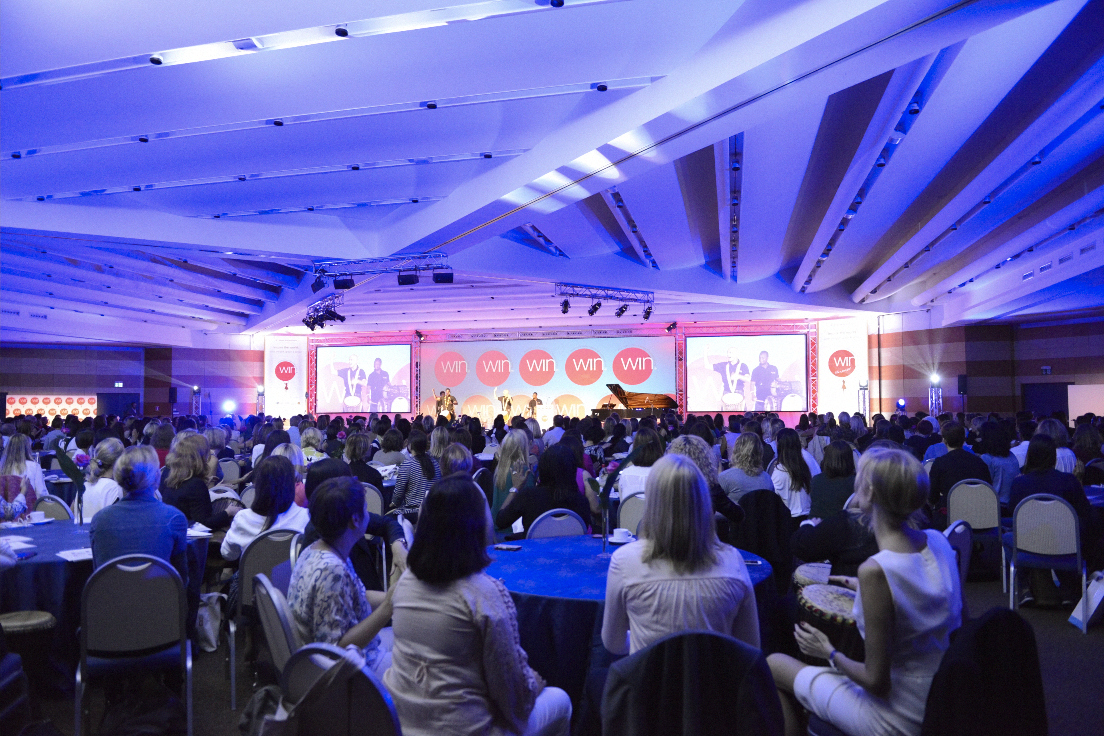

The Women's International Networking Conference (WINConference) is a women's networking conference. It runs annually in capital cities in Europe. The focus of the conference has been women, female empowerment and leadership. The Guardian has described it as a part of a trend they named "Sisterhood 2.0." It is one of the largest conferences of its kind, according to Financial Express.

== About ==
The Women's International Networking Conference was founded in 1997 by Norwegian social entrepreneur Kristin Engvig. Together with a group of corporate women and expatriates she invented the WINConference which was held at Palazzo delle Stelline, IBM Center in Milan in 1998. The conference is attended by business people, politicians, NGO representatives and others. WINConference prepares their attendants for the future through a feminine lens, conducting research on women in management and business and the way they balance work and life. Its vision expands the new paradigm of leading authentically, by integrating feminine values and global interconnectedness and the conference brings influential change-makers and pioneers together to create a more balanced world that works for all.

Since 2009, the global conference is run annually, with around 500 attendees from all over the world. WINConference holds global and local conferences, such as the Middle East (Dubai), Japan WIN Conference and WINConference Nigeria. In 2013, the India Conference was held for the first time. Through thought leadership, advocacy, vision & innovative work on diversity, inclusion, authentic, feminine/balanced, and global conscious leadership WIN Conference touched 22 000 women leaders worldwide as well as an increasing number of men). As of 2016, the global conference has gathered more than 13 000 participants of 129 different nationalities.

== Current and Past editions ==
- September 2017 Oslo
- September 2016 Rome - Leading the Way, with Beauty, Connection and Confidence.
- March 2016 New Delhi
- April 2015 Tokyo
- September 2015 Rome - Inspire the World with insight, grace and action
- April 2014
- 2014 Berlin - A Magnificent Leap of Change
- 2013 Prague - Flourishing together: With Beauty, Trust and Passion.
- 2012 Rome - Making Space: Find Possibilities
- 2011 Rome - Creating History
- 2010 Realizing visions: with clarity, enthusiasm and care
- 2009 Wisdom in Action: Transforming people, organisations and society
- 2008 Creating the future: innovation, integrity and vitality
- 2007 Taking the next step: fearless, graceful and together
- 2006 Rome - Courage to be the change
- 2005 Leading for the future
- 2004 Connecting People to Create Impact
- 2002 Women Building Partnerships Across Boundaries
- 2001 Women Leading Global Change
- 2000 Sustainable Strategies for Women in the Global Era
- 1999 Winning Strategies for Women Working Internationally
- 1998 Winning Strategies for Women in the era of Globalization
