= Primer Encuentro de Mujeres Negras de América Latina y El Caribe =

Primer Encuentro de Mujeres Negras de América Latina y El Caribe (First Meeting of Latin American and Caribbean Women Negras) was an international conference of 300 representatives from 32 (70 is also mentioned) (Note: Alcaldía Mayor de Bogotá) (Note: Secretaria Distrital de la Mujer) countries, which occurred 19–25 July 1992 in Santo Domingo, Dominican Republic. One of its organizers was Ochy Curiel, an Afro-Dominican feminist academic. One of the outcomes of the meeting was an announcement to commemorate July 25 annually as "Día Internacional de las Mujeres negras Afrolatinoamericanas, caribeñas y de la diáspora" (International Day of Black Women of Afro-Latin America, the Caribbean, and the Diaspora).
