= Percival Borde =

Trinidadian dancer and choreographer (1922–1979)

- Born: 31 December 1922; Port of Spain, British Trinidad and Tobago
- Died: 31 August 1979 (aged 56); New York City, U.S.
- Education: NYU School of Arts
- Occupations: Dancer; choreographer
- Employer: Binghamton University
- Spouses: Joyce Guppy (m. 1949, divorced) Pearl Primus (m. 1961)
- Children: 2

Percival Sebastian Borde (31 December 1922 – 31 August 1979) was a Trinidadian dancer and choreographer. Emigrating to the United States after meeting Pearl Primus, he performed for her dance company and on Broadway before his own dance company debuted in 1958. He established a reputation for promoting African-American dance and drew from his Afro-Caribbean roots as a creator. He was also an associate professor at Binghamton University and involved with several non-profits.

== Biography ==
=== Early life and career ===
Borde was born on 31 December 1922, in Port of Spain, located in the then-Colony of Trinidad and Tobago, and raised in Trinidad. His parents were Augustine Francis Lambie and veterinarian George Paul Borde. He was educated at the Queen's Royal College and worked at the Trinidad Government Railway.

A researcher on Afro-Caribbean dance, Borde joined the Little Carib Theatre in the 1940s and served as its director in the 1950s; Thomas F. DeFrantz said that Borde "took easily to dancing and the study of dance as a function of Caribbean culture". He also danced for Beryl McBurnie during then. After being discovered by dancer Pearl Primus, he moved to the United States at her suggestion. He toured for the Pearl Primus Dance Company, including in Europe, and helped teach Caribbean dance at the Pearl Primus School. He appeared as the African Chief in the 1956 Broadway adaptation of the novel Mister Johnson, as well as on television.

=== Dance and education career ===
On 23 September 1958, Borde's own dance company made its premiere at St. Mark's Playhouse; they continued performing for the rest of the month and through the following one, with several African and Caribbean dances. Borde established a reputation as "as a leading male figure in Afro-dance", and became popular in the African-American media. In 1959, he toured Africa alongside Primus and they co-founded the Konama Kende Performing Arts Center in Monrovia. In 1969, he worked at the Negro Ensemble Company as that season's resident choreographer. He produced a New York State Education Department-sponsored program called Talking Drums of Africa, which performed in Kansas and Maryland in 1970. Other events he appeared at include the Caribbean Arts Festival and the Jacob's Pillow Dance Festival.

Borde's creative work drew from Afro-Caribbean roots, and would often use ethnographic approaches towards African-American character archetypes. He frequently performed Earth Magician, a four-part piece involving four characters of color. One piece he performed for over two decades, "Impinyuza", was a strutting dance inspired by Tutsi warriors. DeFrantz called Borde a continuation of both Primus and Katherine Dunham's legacy of promoting anthropologically-researched dance performances and said that his "masculine stage presence and dynamic performance style" promoted public attention to African-American concert dance. In 1979, Jennifer Dunning described him as "a leading exponent of black concert dance" within the preceding two decades. John O. Perpener III said that Borde's "roles as performer, manager, fellow researcher, and school director became a central part of [Primus'] life".

In 1975, Borde obtained a bachelor degree from the NYU School of Arts, where he also studied for a master degree. He was an associate professor of theater arts and black studies at Binghamton University, where he was one of its most popular teachers and "remembered as a big, exuberant man who danced through the classroom in a dashiki, prodding his students on with a big stick and an inexhaustible fund of good-humored sarcasm". He also taught at Columbia University's Teachers College and NYU School of the Arts, and directed SUNY Binghamton's dance program. He was also a board member for the Congress on Research in Dance, as well as executive director for the Pearl Primus Dance Language Institute. He was also affiliated with non-profit Youthbridge, being one of their founding staff and later a consultant.

=== Personal life and death ===
Borde was married to Joyce Guppy from 1949 until their divorce, and his next wife was Pearl Primus. He had two children, one from each marriage; his son from his second marriage was percussionist Onwin Borde. During the 1959 Africa tour, Vai chief Sondifu Sonni gave Borde the name Jangbanolima (lit. "a man who lives to dance"). Borde and Primus later lived in New Rochelle, New York.

Borde died of a heart attack on 31 August 1979 while at the Perry Street Theater in New York City to perform "Impinyuza"; (Note: Sources vary on whether it occurred during the performance, after the performance, or backstage.) he was 54. His widow succeeded him as SUNY Binghamton professor, and dedicated her Earth performance in March 1981 to him.
