= National Coordinating Committee of Indigenous Women =

The National Coordinating Committee of Indigenous Women (Spanish: Coordinadora Nacional de Mujeres Indigenas, CONAMI) brings together indigenous women from diverse communities across Mexico and focuses on serving the needs and rights of women and indigenous people nationally, regionally, and internationally. This organization was created in August 1997 in the Mexican state of Oaxaca. Its formation provided a national forum where Indigenous women could share their experiences within their communities, address issues that had often been minimized in mixed-gender movements, and coordinate their efforts across different regions.

CONAMI was founded by Indigenous women who were involved in organizations such as the National Indigenous Congress (CNI) and the Zapatista Army of National Liberation (EZLN) in order to confront the gender inequality they encountered throughout these broader struggles. Key events in the organization's history include its 2012 agenda calling for rights related to territory, health, and freedom from violence as well as the Second National Encuentro in 2000 and the 2014 constitutional amendments related to electoral equality in Mexico. CONAMI maintains its history through archival collections kept at the UCLA Mobile Indigenous Community Archive in the United States and continues its mission through political training workshops.

== Historical context ==
In the 1970s and 1980s, Indigenous women in Mexico were deeply involved in community organizing and Indigenous rights campaigns. National organizations like the Coordinadora Nacional de Ayala (CNPA) and the Unión Nacional de Organizaciones Regionales Campesinas Autónomas (UNORCA) created a space for women to participate, but many still faced gender based marginalization inside these movements. These experiences encouraged organizing as indigenous women not just as campesinas, or rural peasants, recognizing that gender inequality was tied to their communities' larger struggles.

During this period, Indigenous political movements were expanding in response to land dispossession, state violence, and the socioeconomic effects of neoliberal reforms. At the same time, Indigenous women were taking part in political education and feminist discussions, which gave them new tools to speak out about their rights as Indigenous peoples.

Several major developments in the 1980s and 1990s helped Indigenous women center inclusion, autonomy, and cultural identity in their organizing. One key moment was the 1992, 500 years of Indigenous Black and Popular Resistance Campaign. The second was the Fourth World Conference on Women in Beijing in 1995, where many Indigenous women participated through government selected representatives or NGOs. Because representatives were often chosen by the state, many women became the only indigenous voices from their region, limiting their ability to speak collectively. This pushed many to build their own spaces where they could represent themselves and their communities directly. These efforts contributed to larger networks like the Continental Network of Indigenous Women of the Americas (ECMIA), which placed Indigenous women's political and cultural concerns at the forefront.

At the same time, the Zapatista Army of National Liberation (EZLN) became a major influence, calling for justice, dignity and autonomy of indigenous peoples. Indigenous women played a central role by challenging gender inequality, and bringing their experiences from community movements to do so. These perspectives shaped the Clandestine Revolutionary Indigenous Committee (CCRI), the main Indigenous leadership council whose contributions led the movement to rethink gender dynamics within its own organization.

== Founding of CONAMI ==
International conferences, feminist engagement, community organizing, and revolutionary movements, created the groundwork for the formation of CONAMI. During this period of national and international organizing, the Congreso Nacional Indigena (CNI) and the Asamblea Nacional Indigena Plural por la Autonomia (ANIPA) became two important indigenous movements in Mexico during the 1990s that led to CONAMI's formation. CNI centered on community autonomy in alignment with the EZLN, while ANIPA pushed for indigenous rights through engagement with the state and united around 270 Indigenous women from diverse pueblos across Mexico, helping begin articulating their political priorities.

This momentum was also influenced by the EZLN's "Revolutionary Law of Women," drafted in 1993 and later announced publicly during the first Zapatista uprising in 1994. The law reflected demands developed collectively by EZLN communities and made gender issues visible within the organizing. It also promoted national conversations about gender inequality within Indigenous contexts.

As Indigenous organizing expanded, women from different communities in Mexico and across Latin America met at the First Continental Meeting of Indigenous Women in Quito, Ecuador, in 1995, and again during the 1996 San Andrés Dialogues. In these spaces, women shared experiences, identified common barriers, and raised concerns that male leaders often minimized, especially those related to gender discrimination. Their discussions connected Indigenous peoples' rights, women's organizing, and national political inclusion. As a result, the women who attended these meetings were encouraged to find ways to organize collectively and strengthen their collective voice.

Building on these earlier encuentros, Indigenous women active in ANIPA and the CNI launched the First National Encuentro of Indigenous Women in Oaxaca de Juárez, Oaxaca, in 1997, where they created their own space to discuss gender, autonomy, and community needs. This meeting led to the founding of CONAMI on August 29, 1997, bringing together Indigenous women from diverse regions who sought to develop organizational mechanisms at national and international levels. They worked to articulate a shared agenda for their rights and political participation. The founding grew out of the CNI's Women's Commission and was shaped by key organizers such as Sofía Robles who emphasized building understanding around Indigenous women's specific demands, and Rufina Villa of Maseualsiuamej Mosenyolchicawanij, who stressed advancing these struggles from within their own communities. The initiative drew inspiration from the Zapatistas' 1994 "Revolutionary Law of Women," and from ANIPA's earlier 1990 National Women's Encuentro, which helped make CONAMI's formation possible, establishing it as a national platform for Indigenous women's political organizing and collective self-determination.

== Goals of CONAMI ==
CONAMI's goals focus on serving the needs and rights of women and indigenous people. Their goals are outlined as justice, multicultural respect, autonomy, and self-determination.

In the Agenda Política Mujeres Indígenas de México (Political Agenda of Indigenous Women of Mexico), which was formulated in 2012, CONAMI is one of the authors and this agenda outlines political goals and a description of their demands.

1. "Derechos Culturas (identidad, educación y tecnología)" [Cultural Rights (identity, education and technology)]
  - For Mexico to respect their indigenous way of life and for their sacred lands, spaces, and temples to not be turned into tourist attractions.
2. "Derecho al territorio y recursos naturales" (Right to territory and natural resources)
  - For Mexico to grant them rights to their territory as well as the right to control and influence what happens in their territories.
3. "Derechos políticos" (Political Rights)
  - They ask for the state to recognize and accept their ways of gathering and organizing themselves. Furthermore, they ask the state of Mexico to respect their authoritative communities and to recognize them across different governmental levels.
4. "Derechos económicos y sociales" (Economic and social rights)
  - For Mexico to protect their seeds, especially as genetically modified and imported seeds have disrupted their lands have disrupted their food source. Furthermore, they demand for the state to stop contaminating their land with fertilizers, foreign crops, and other harmful additives that disrupt their food source and land.
5. "Derecho a la salud, derechos sexuales y reproductivos, y derecho a una vida libre de violencia" (Right to health, sexual and reproductive rights, and right to a life free of violence)
  - For the Mexican state to uphold indigenous women's rights and recognize the violence and discrimination indigenous women have endured.

=== International influence ===
Although most CONAMI events and goals are centered around the indigenous lands and people in Mexico, this organization has spread their ideology and goals on an international scale. In November 1998, CONAMI met with Mary Robinson, who served as the United Nations High Commissioner of Human Rights during the Indigenous Decade. CONAMI used this opportunity to discuss the ongoing violence in the state of Chiapas. This was during a period of conflict in Chiapas, when the Mexican government attempted to deescalate protests and indigenous organizing occurring due to human rights violations, yet CONAMI successfully brought awareness to this issue on a global scale.

=== Related organizations and continental networks ===
Over time, Indigenous women's organizations interacted through encuentros and continental networks such as ECMIA, which held meetings in places like Ecuador, Mexico and Panama. These gatherings brought together Indigenous women from more than twenty countries to address issues such as land rights, extractive industries, and gender based violence. CONAMI also participated in these spaces, taking part in ECMIA's meetings and was supported by organizations such as CHIRAPAQ and the International Indigenous Women's Forum. Through this involvement, CONAMI's goals aligned with and strengthened a wider movement across Abya Yala, the pre-Columbian name for the Americas.

== Structure ==
Structure

The structure of the CONAMI is based on general coordination, and six working committees are established under it. The working committees are International Documents, Spirituality, Crafts and Marketing, Training, Health and Education, and Political Relations.

Responsible for coordinating CONAMI

・1997 - 1999 Margarita Gutierrez Romero Sofía Robles

・2000 - 2001 Maria de Jesús Patricio

・2001 - 2004 Candida Jiménez

・2004-2006 Martha Sanchez Nestor

・2006 -2008 Felicitas Martínez

・2008 - Ernestina Ortiz Peña

== Significant events ==
CONAMI helped organize a series of National Encuentros, of Indigenous Women, a series of large-scale gatherings that became significant turning points for the Indigenous women's movement. In 2000, hundreds of Indigenous women activists attended the Segundo Encuentro Nacional de Mujeres Indigenas, also known as the Second National Encounter of Indigenous Women, or CONAMI, which took place in Chilpancingo, Guerrero. Demanding justice for women who were suffering because of the rising militarization and political oppression affecting their communities was the main goal of this event, which served as an important organizing space.

Attendees emphasized the gendered and racialized violence against Indigenous women during the event. Research on these topics at this conference, which addressed the increased violence committed by the government and drug traffickers in the context of the War on Drugs, was significant in starting the early movement against femicide. The conference attendees portrayed the violence on their villages as a direct "war on indigenous communities."

The second encuentro of CONAMI symbolized the development of an Indigenous women's multigenerational struggle. Prominent figures included Doña Rufina Villa of Masehual Siuamej Mosenyolchicauani, one of Mexico's oldest Indigenous women's groups, and María de Jesús Patricio (Marichuey), a Nahuatl healer. The Nación P'urépecha Zapatista's Tomasa Sandoval refuted the Western legal theory's tendency to pit Indigenous rights against women's rights.

In November 2014, a law altering the federal constitution was passed, marking a significant turning point for the country. The legal reform, was started by Eufrosina Cruz Mendoza, a Zapotec indigenous woman and former plurinominal deputy in the federal Chamber of Deputies, who fought against the long-standing social and political marginalization of indigenous women in Mexico. It sought to guarantee that indigenous women could participate equally in elections against their male counterparts. The amendment made it clear that if indigenous customs violate the principles of equal participation and universal suffrage, they cannot be enforced. Because it directly addressed the various forms of discrimination these women experienced, including poverty, gender, and indigenous identity, this constitutional amendment was extremely important. The amendment helped to "correct certain contradictions of democracy" and changed stereotypes by establishing equal political rights.

== Archival collections ==
Archival collections documenting the National Coordinating Committee of Indigenous Women in Mexico are found in several collections that preserve the organization's work and its role within Indigenous women's movements. These collections are held in the UCLA Mobile Indigenous Community Archive, and they include records focused on political organizing, leadership, and the relationship between CONAMI and the Mexico chapter of the Continental Network of Indigenous Women of the Americas. The collections include written statements, workshop materials, reports, and documents created by members and coordinators who took part in national and continental activities.

The CONAMI collection contains writings and public statements produced by the organization and by the CONAMI-ECMIA Región México. The materials include declarations made during national meetings as well as bulletins and reports that describe issues raised by Indigenous women in different regions of the country. The collection also holds items from the Continental Meeting of Indigenous Women. These documents show how members addressed concerns such as community safety, discrimination, political participation, and the protection of Indigenous women's rights.

Records from the collection of Fabiola Jurado, an activist who has played an important role in CONAMI and in efforts to support the rights of Indigenous women, provide a closer view of leadership inside the organization. These materials are also stored in the UCLA Mobile Indigenous Community Archive. Her materials include public messages responding to violence against Indigenous women and statements calling for justice. Other documents describe the creation of political agendas that guided community action and advocacy work. Her papers also contain writings from workshops where members identified local problems and discussed shared strategies. These materials help explain how CONAMI shaped national discussions about rights, cultural identity, and the safety of Indigenous communities.

The collection connected to Margarita Gutiérrez, a Hñahñu woman and a well known Indigenous activist who helped create several important organizations including CONAMI and regional networks for Indigenous women, includes documents that show how CONAMI participated in regional and continental organizing through ECMIA México. Her materials contain writings on Indigenous women's leadership, cultural identity, and political history in Latin America. The collection also holds documents from continental meetings where members discussed autonomy, representation, and collective action. The records help place CONAMI within a wider movement of Indigenous women across the Americas and show how national organizing in Mexico was linked to regional coordination and shared goals.
