= MANA, A National Latina Organization =

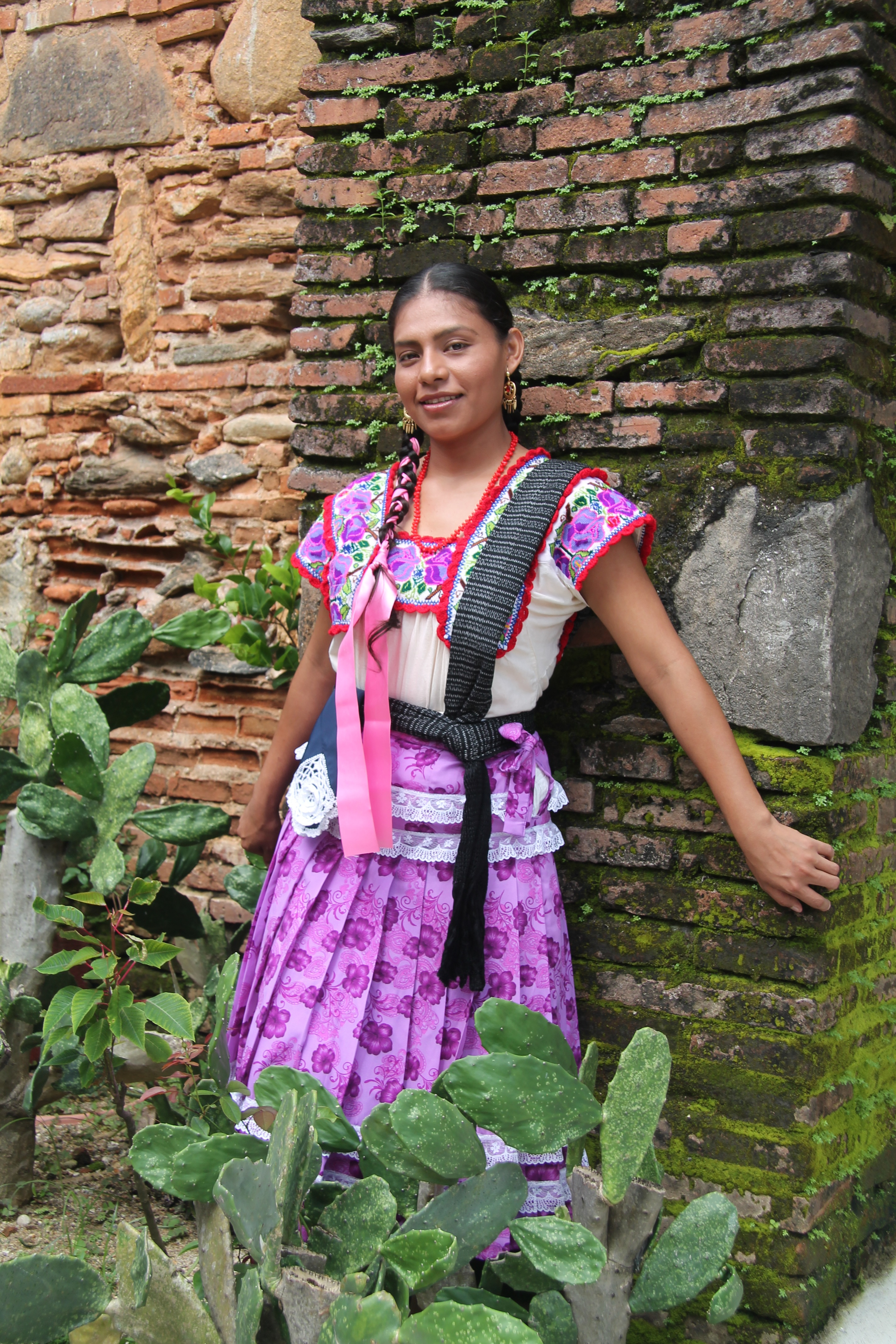
- Mexican American woman in a traditional dress.
- Founded: 1974
- Type: NGO
- Purpose: leadership development, community service, advocacy
- Website: https://www.hermana.org/about
- Formerly called: Mexican American Woman's National Association

Mexican American Women's National Association, known today as MANA, A National Latina Organization, advocates for equality and empowers Latinas through leadership development. MANA was founded in 1974, making it one of the oldest active Mexican-American advocacy organizations, and as of 2000, it is considered the largest Latina organization in the United States. The organization was formed to address the intersection of Mexican-American and women's needs for equal rights. The founders created MANA with the intent of having a Latina-oriented organization. MANA publicizes and addresses Latina perspectives and needs through Social movements, Leadership education, and Advocacy within federal, state, and local governments. They have been involved with multiple major social movements throughout their history. These include advocating for the Equal Rights Amendment and Reproductive rights, as well as social movements on education, leadership development, women's healthcare, and racial discrimination in the work. MANA currently operates from its home base in Washington, D.C., and has local chapters across the nation.

The organization was renamed MANA, A National Latina Organization in 1994. This renaming accommodated non-Hispanic members who were previously not included in the organization's name or mission statement.

== History ==
The Mexican-American Women's National Association was formed in 1974 by Blandina Cardenas Ramírez, Gloria Hernandez, Bettie Baca, and Sharleen Maldonado over a series of weekend brunches in Washington, D.C. Bettie Baca was the first chair women of the group when it started in 1974. The founders were dissatisfied with the gender bias and misogyny of the Chicano Movement and with the exclusion of women of color from Second-wave feminism, so they created an organization that directly advanced Chicana feminism. A year after founding, at the 1975 International Women's Year, founder Bettie Baca explained the importance of pluralism: "While we share with all women the universal victimization of sexism, the Mexican American woman's situation is complicated by a struggle within a society that has historically failed to honor, to understand and even to acknowledge her culture among women. Chicanas always have suffered by the use of the terms minority and women. These terms...have had the consequence of excluding the Mexican American woman rather than including her." In 1975 the board of MANA elected Evangeline Elizondo as their first president. There are no longer presidents of the organization. The position is now called board of chair. MANA's original guiding principles were: to provide a platform for Chicanas to speak out about national issues, to develop Chicana leadership, to create more equality between male and female Mexican-Americans, to reinforce all activist efforts relating to Chicana equality, to spread awareness of Chicana concerns across the nation, and to develop a functional communication network for Chicanas across the country. Within two years of its establishment, MANA was known as a voice for Hispanic and Mexican women and a resource for their development.

=== First national conference ===
From 15 to 17 September 1975, MANA held its first national conference- the first major conference in the United States by and for Mexican-American women. Over 200 women attended to discuss problems that their community faced and possible solutions. The conference affected MANA's long-term development in two ways: it established MANA as a national and official voice for Chicanas and began MANA's extensive use of conferences as a forum for advancement and community-building.

=== 1977 National Women's Conference ===
Early leaders of the Mexican American Women's National Association attended the 1977 National Women's Conference, a culminating event sponsored by the Federal government of the United States in honor of International Women's Year in 1975. MANA's representation was a major debut for the fledgling organization and served to spread their name further. This conference discussed major issues women faced during this time, which aligned with MANA's focuses as a women's Mexican-American advocacy group. MANA was a major player at the Minority breakout conference, 1977 Women's National Conference: Minority-Latino-Women.

=== Creation of local chapters ===
In 1978, MANA began establishing local chapters to reach women who felt distanced from the national community. The first few local groups did not gain enough members to succeed because of MANA's low membership outside of Washington, D.C., but by 1979 local chapters were flourishing in New Mexico, Virginia, and California. Local chapters advocate for Chicana rights in their individual communities, address any specific needs not discussed nationally, and contribute to national MANA movements and actions. MANA's annual conferences provided a space for Latinas and MANA members across the country to unite and share their local work, and continue to do so today.

=== Early activism ===
MANA advocated for Chicana representation and inclusion in United States Politics, women's healthcare, Social equality, and against Mexican American and women's Economic inequality. MANA's political advocacy included campaigning for accurate inclusion in the United States Census, which underrepresented the Mexican American population; lobbying for the Equal Rights Amendment and Affirmative action in the United States; pushing for the renewal of Voting Rights Act of 1965, and campaigning for Chicana representation as officials in all areas of the government. MANA's early medical advocacy focused on Reproductive rights, Mexican American access to healthcare, Compulsory sterilization, and for AIDS testing and treatment during the AIDS crisis. MANA also advocated frequently for Labor rights, Equal pay for women, support for survivors of Violence against women, and Female education for Chicana girls.

MANA members testified for these issues in the Supreme Court as early as 1974. Many of the civil rights movements they contributed to resulted in legislature or policies protecting equality and human rights, such as Affirmative Action, equal voting rights, and Census accuracy.

=== 15th anniversary and name change ===
In 1989, as the Mexican-American Women's National Association celebrated its fifteenth anniversary, MANA's leaders and activists began discussing the organization's original mission statement and name. The Mexican-American Women's National Association always welcomed women of all Hispanic backgrounds, and by 1989 there were many non-Mexican Latina women involved in MANA. Some members suggested MANA officially acknowledge Latina contributions and issues by including all Latinas in its name, mission statement, and guiding principles. This was a controversial suggestion, and discussions on the topic lasted for five years. Many members believed the name change represented a positive step toward the future because MANA's former name represented social exclusion, and some members supported the name change because they believed Chicana and Latina issues were the same to American society. Older activists disagreed with the suggestion, fearing that the voices, experiences, and contributions from the organization's first fifteen years would be discounted. They claimed that this inclusion would combine all Latina ethnicities and erase Mexican American women's unique community, which was MANA's original purpose. MANA leadership held a vote in 1994, at which point the Mexican-American Women's National Association officially became MANA, A National Latina Organization.

"MANA" was originally an acronym for the Mexican American Women's National Association that was frequently used to refer to the organization. Beginning in 1994, MANA was now a part of the official name, MANA represents the organization's history and is shorthand for the Spanish word hermana, or sister.

== Current activism ==
MANA's contemporary activism focuses on Latina leadership development, Latina social achievements and representation, Hispanic women's education, Reproductive rights, Economic inequality, Latina inclusion, services for survivors of Domestic violence, and Immigration reform in the United States. Because of its activism, MANA remains an active organization decades after founding, making it one of the longest continually active Mexican-American organization in America, with 23 local chapters across the country. Furthermore, MANA's collaborations, annual conferences, and testimonies were well known during their early years, and continue to form the base of their work today. MANA currently continues holding Las Primeras, an annual conference started in 1990, and runs two educational initiatives, Hermanitas and AvonZamos.

== Membership ==
MANA's membership is estimated to be between 1,000 and 3,000 Hispanic and Latinx individuals. A multitude of Latinx ethnicities are represented, including (but not limited to) members of Mexican, Puerto Rican, Dominican, Cuban, Central American, South American, and Spanish descent. While MANA is an organization for Hispanic women, there are active male members as well. The organization is liberal, especially in terms of its original activism, but it is a nonpartisan organization and has liberal, conservative, libertarian, and other politically aligned members and leaders.

MANA puts a focus on leadership and career development and its members follow a variety of professional careers. The majority of women in MANA have pursued higher education, with 80% possessing a Bachelor's degree. Additionally, 30% of overall members have both a college and Postgraduate diploma. Members work as chief executive officers; elected officials; teachers; staff or founders of nonprofit organizations; health professionals; government workers; artists; lawyers; paralegals; human services and social work professionals; scientists; and other professions.

== See also ==
- Las Adelitas de Aztlán
- Comisión Femenil Mexicana Nacional
- National Association of Chicana and Chicano Studies
- Ovarian Psycos
