= Central California Women's Conference =

The Central California Women’s Conference (CCWC) is an annual one-day conference serving women of all generations, ethnicities and backgrounds in Fresno, California.

The conference serves as a forum for women of all generations and backgrounds to share practical ideas on how to succeed in their careers while juggling the demands of life. Traditionally the conference attracts a sold-out crowd of 3,500 women. The conference is held annually in mid-September and includes a luncheon keynote speaker, twenty-seven sessions, and a tradeshow with about 175 vendors. The conference empowers women in all stages of their lives.

== History ==
The late State Senator Ken Maddy founded the Central California Women’s Conference in 1988. This conference was designed with the plans to educate, motivate and inspire women so they can excel in their professional and personal lives.

Topics for the conference address issues relevant to women and are led by national, regional and local experts.

The conference draws a crowd of 3,500 or more women and is one of the largest women’s conferences in the state of California.

== Keynote Speakers ==
Each year the conference hosts a luncheon with a keynote speaker. The first speaker was Rita Moreno in 1988.

- 2019 - Tyra Banks
- 2018 - Maria Shriver
- 2017 - Amy Purdy
- 2016 - Lisa Ling
- 2015 - Leeza Gibbons
- 2014 - Valerie Bertinelli
- 2013 -Helen Hunt
- 2012 –Jamie Lee Curtis
- 2011 –Geena Davis
- 2010 – Marie Osmond
- 2009 – Robin Roberts (newscaster)
- 2008 – Suze Orman
- 2007 – Goldie Hawn
- 2006 – Nancy Brinker
- 2005 – Joan Lunden
- 2004 – Star Jones
- 2003 – Erin Brockovich
- 2002 – Peggy Fleming
- 2001 – Cokie Roberts
- 2000 – Marcia Wallace
- 1999 – Suze Orman
- 1998 – The Honorable Ann Richards
- 1997 – Paula Zahn
- 1996 – Vicki Lawrence
- 1995 – Lynn Sherr
- 1994 – Nancy Snyderman
- 1993 – Jehan Sadat
- 1992 – Gail Sheehy
- 1991 – Debbie Reynolds
- 1990 – Sherry Lansing
- 1989 – Wilma Rudolph
- 1988 – Rita Moreno

== Giving Back ==
CCWC is a 501(c)3 nonprofit and has donated more than one-half a million dollars to charities that are for the support of women and children. Past donations have gone to support causes such as emergency and homeless shelters, domestic violence and sexual assault, treatment and prevention, parenting classes and family counseling. Previous recipients include Encourage Tomorrow, Evangel Home, Inc., Family Services of Tulare County-Rape Crisis, Focus Forward, Holy Cross Center for Women, Majaree Mason Center, Naomi’s House, Parent Resource Center, Pregnancy Care Center, Samaritan Women and Sisterhood of Survivors.

== Sources ==
- Central California Women's Conference: ccwc-fresno.org
- Facebook: facebook.com/CCWC.Fresno/info
- Women's Conference Portfolio: ccwcfresno.wordpress.com
