= Conferencia de Mujeres por la Raza =

1971 Chicana feminist conference

Poster

La Conferencia de Mujeres por la Raza (or the National Chicana Conference) was held in Houston, Texas, between May 28 and May 30, 1971. The conference marked the first time Chicanas came together within the state from around the country to discuss issues important to feminism and Chicana women. It was considered the first conference of its kind by the Corpus Christi Caller-Times.

== About ==
The conference took place between May 28 and May 30, 1971, and was held at the Magnolia Park YWCA in Houston. It was held as part of the International Decade for Women. Chicana women faced three different kinds of discrimination: racism, classism and sexism. The conference was meant to address these issues. Prior to this national conference, regional groups had met to start planning for the bigger event. The head organizer was Elma Barrera. Other major organizers included Yolanda Garza Birdwell and Gloria Guardiola. Anglo women working at the YWCA helped plan and organize the event as well. During the planning, there been a miscommunication about places to stay for the conference and many women from outside of Houston were without a place to stay.

There were over six hundred Chicana participants at the conference. People who came to the conference included members of the local community, activists, community organizers, students, various professionals and nuns. However, around 80 percent of the women were between the ages of 18 and 23 and were college and university students. Organizations attending the conference included La Raza Unida Party, labor unions, the Mexican American Youth Organization (MAYO), and Las Hermanas.

On the conference's first day, several workshops addressed gender issues, sexual liberation, family planning and ways in which women have been oppressed within the Chicano community. The first workshop discussed about the topic of sex, the second workshop focused on the topic of education, the third workshop discussed about marriage, and the fourth workshop covered the topic on religion. On the second day, topics relating to how Chicana women fit into a broader framework of women's liberation was discussed.

There was a walkout on the third day of the conference. About half of the conference attendees left because they felt that the assembly should focus on racism instead of sexism. The group was angry that the conference was being held in a "Gringo" institution. The walkout started while Bertha Hernandez was speaking at the 3rd day's General Assembly. Those who walked out continued their own conference at a park nearby, where they created their own resolutions. Some of the workshops on day three were cancelled because of the walkout. Some of the women who attended the conference "felt that talking about a women's agenda was divisive to the movement, while others were disturbed by the presence of white women at the conference." The walkout demonstrated "how Chicana feminism was in flux both nationally and regionally in the early stages of the Chicano/a Movement." The women who called for the walkout contended "that Chicanas had no business holding the conference at the YWCA because it was run by gavachas." Many of the women who attended the conference "were not involved with the planning of the conference because the women running it wanted no suggestions or criticism from anyone." Also, many of the women did not like the workshops because "nothing was being accomplished, and most were getting off the subjects." Anna NietoGomez categorized the walkout as "a conflict between Chicana feminists and loyalists."

Conference attendees had two sets of resolutions to review because of the split. It was intended that all attendees review these before the second Conferencia de Mujeres por La Raza. Individual communities would then be able to comment and a vote on the resolutions would be taken at the next conference in 1972.

== Legacy ==
The conference raised the issue of feminism within the Chicano community. It led to the creation of resolutions from two of the largest workshops, "Sex and the Chicana" and "Marriage--Chicana Style" which addressed women's rights, access to birth control and abortions and for Chicana women to denounce machismo, discrimination in education, double standards for men and women and "the repressive ideology of the Catholic Church." The conference "signaled the growth of a national political movement and potential political project of Chicana feminism." Resolutions were also created regarding the importance of childcare centers. The Conference served as "a map of fractures, tensions, and the various centers of gravity in the emergence of a political project of Chicana feminism." La Conferencia was the development of a strong group of Chicanas who were "providing leadership for their sisters."

After the conference the number of articles published about Chicana issues increased significantly. Barrera has continued to speak about her experience with the conference.

The Lucy R. Moreno Collection at the University of Texas at Austin contains materials and clippings from the conference.
