= Latina women at the 1977 National Women's Conference =

The 1977 National Women's Conference was held November 18–21, in Houston, Texas, United States. The purpose of this conference was to celebrate International Women's Year and also to create resolutions for women to discuss and address.

The event was important for minority and Latina women in particular, as it gave them, a platform with which to voice their concerns. It brought attention to the issues of minority women, which were often overshadowed by those of the white majority, as one attendee, Jane Hickie, explained: "I don't believe that Anglo women had heard directly expressed those sorts of frustrations from other women who were Mexican American or Puerto Rican American, Latinas, ever before."

== Background ==
=== Hispanic women ===
According to the United States Census Bureau, as of March 1977, there were 5.7 million women of Spanish-origin in the United States. These woman are of Mexican, Puerto Rican, and Cuban descent, as well as from Central or South America and other Spanish-speaking countries.

=== Mexican-American women ===
In March 1976, 17.2 percent of females in Mexican American families, who worked anytime during 1975, 60.3 percent had earnings below the poverty level.

=== Puerto Rican women ===
In the census of 1977, it showed that there was 1.7 million Puerto Ricans living in the United States. Of these, 934,000 were Puerto Rican women and girls.

Data indicates that in 1976, 38 percent of Puerto Rican families in the United States were headed by women.

== Organizations ==
=== Mexican American Women's National Association ===
MANA was organized in the year 1974. A group of Chicanas who lived in Washington D.C. began gathering weekend brunches to discuss their exclusion from the feminist movements agenda and their relative invisibility in policy making meetings. Many of the founders who held jobs in the federal government, in congress, or with private policy making groups, inferred that Chicanas needed an organization just like other groups formed by White and African American women.

By 1975, MANA had elected their first officers and defined their goals. Such goals included: advocating for issues relevant to Chicanas, developing leadership opportunities, creating a national awareness of Chicana concerns, and national communications network developing for Chicanas. Later that year, MANA hosted its first national conference for and by Chicanas.

== Issues discussed ==
=== Health ===
The life expectancy for minority women was 72.3 years in 1975. In comparison, for white women, life expectancy was 77.2 years. Maternal mortality was 29.0 per 100,000 minority women, as opposed to 9.1 per 100,000 white women. Among minority women, infant mortality rate was 24.2 per 1,000 non-white births as compared with 16.1 per 1,000 in the overall population.

=== Education ===
Collectively, minority women received less formal education than white women. As of March 1977, white women aged 25 and older had completed 12.4 years of school, whereas, compared to 11.7 years of minority women who were in the same range of age. In continuation of March 1977, 64 percent of minority women workers had graduated from high school. This included 12 percent of women who had completed four or more years of college. However, minority women with high school or higher education levels still received lower salaries than educated white women and lower salaries than minority and white men with much less education.

=== Employment ===
Minority women rank below minority men and white men. According to the U.S. Bureau of Labor Statistics, in 1975, the average minority female worker earned 26 percent less than the average minority male, and 43 percent less than the average white male. These statistics are prevalent to minority women since 28 percent of the 7.5 million families are headed by women. One-third of all families headed by women are below the poverty level. This is seen more through Black and Hispanic families.

Minority women had an unemployment rate of 13.3 percent in 1977, compared with the 7.8 percent rate of their white counterparts. The unemployment rate for female minority teenagers was 39.0 percent in 1976.

As of March 1977, 45 percent of employed minority women were in white collar jobs, compared to the 66 percent of employed white women. About 23 percent of white women were working in higher paying, professional-technical, and managerial positions, compared with the 18 percent of minority women. Sixteen percent of minority women occupied lower paying careers (e.g., assemblers, inspectors, semiskilled factory workers) compared to the 10 percent of white women.

In 1976, the median income for all white families in the U.S. was about $15,620. For families headed by women, the median income was $8,226 for whites and $5,140 for minorities.

== See also ==
- Rachel Navarro
