= Latin American and Caribbean Feminist Encuentros =

- Status: Active
- Genre: Feminist conference
- Frequency: Biennial / periodic
- Locations: Various countries in Latin America and the Caribbean
- Inaugurated: 1981
- Participants: Feminists, activists, academics, community organizers

The Latin American and Caribbean Feminist Encuentros (Spanish: Encuentro Feminista de Latinoamérica y el Caribe-EFLAC) are a series conferences which began in 1981 to develop transnational networks within the region of Latin America and the Caribbean. The main focus of the conferences was to discuss and evaluate how women's marginalization and oppression could be eliminated given the existing economic and political systems by forming networks and strategies to create alternatives to existing norms. At times contentious, the various conferences explored what feminism meant—whether it was an inclusive movement or limited by social class, racial make-up, or sexuality; whether it was militant or passive; whether it was political, social, or economic; whether it was designed to work within patriarchal systems or needed to create new systems; and even whether accepting funding invalidated being feminist. Numerous initiatives recognizing diverse groups of women, such as Black and indigenous women, lesbian women, and various cultural and economic groups were spawned by the dialogues. The conferences are an ongoing attempt to negotiate strategies in an attempt to change region-wide policy agendas toward women.

== History ==
In 1975, the United Nations approved the celebration of International Women's Year. As part of the celebrations they held the First World Conference on Women in 1975 in Mexico City. At that meeting, it was proposed that the following decade be proclaimed UN Decade for Women and follow-up meetings to assess progress be held in 1980 and 1985. The General Assembly adopted a World Plan of Action with recommended targets for governments to integrate women's equality, development and participation in peace initiatives. For the first time, institutional collection within the UN evaluated the extent of problems and conditions of women in varying nations, specifically separating data by sex to bring to light the level of inequality and discrimination towards women. It was also one of the first international meetings of organized lesbians from multiple countries and cultures. Attitudes within the member nations and the UN itself began to change as a result of the focus on women brought about by the conference. The conference connected women to other women in their struggles, as well as increasing governmental understanding of the needs of their constituent women. In turn, this led to a surge in women's activists coming together across the globe and the development of the Latin American and Caribbean Feminist Encuentros.

The diverse struggles of women throughout Latin America and the Caribbean had led by the 1970s to a rejection of feminism and the dubbing of women's movements as bourgeois outcropping of imperialists. The abuse of women by the military regimes in Latin America through the decade between 1970 and 1980 as well as a shared colonial and neocolonial experience made women aware that gender issues needed to be re-examined as human rights challenges. The Encuentros were conceived as a means for women to share their diverse perspectives and create alternative strategies for coping with the marginalization which they experienced in the predominant patriarchal and masculinist societal structures in which they lived. The conferences were devoted to developing strategy to address economic inequality, fallout of colonialism and neocolonialism, political suppression, racism, and sexism, in the hopes of creating new collective methods to deal with health, political representation, poverty, violence and the invisibility of women's voices. Ideologically, there was a recognition that women's rights were curtailed in both capitalistic and socialistic systems. The question became whether one should try to work within an existing system to improve women's agency, or advocate for change outside any existent political sphere.

== First Encounter, Bogotá, Colombia 1981 ==
The First Encuentro was held in Bogotá in 1981 with 200 feminists and representing fifty NGOs from Argentina, Brazil, Chile, Colombia, Curaçao, Dominican Republic, Ecuador, Panama, Peru, Puerto Rico, and Venezuela.At this foundational meeting it was important for the women to discuss how they would define feminism. On the one hand were groups dismissing feministas as elites with no understanding of the political and social reality of middle- and lower-class women, and on the other hand, there were políticas or political militants, who were seen as radical leftists intent on continuing the revolutionary upheavals from which the various countries had so recently emerged.Feminists argued that they were not focused on obtaining practical (feminine) goals, but rather wanted relevant, strategic (feminist) focus. The militants stressed that the only way to reach all women was with "leftist party organizing and revolutionary mobilization".

The divide, in many ways mirrored the Cold War geopolitical divides of whether economics, racism, or sexism was the more important factor in the subordination of women. This in turn led to discussion of whether existing systems needed reform, by institutionalizing feminist ideals, or whether women's issues needed to remain outside the political realm and maintain their autonomy and focus, instead of focusing on converting male leftists' policies to include women. The polarized positions were not resolved at the conference, leading to additional controversy in Peru; however, the conference attendees made a pledge to honor the Mirabal sisters and mark November 25 as a day to rally against violence toward women, which would later be adopted by the United Nations as the International Day for the Elimination of Violence against Women in 1995.

== Second Encounter, Lima, Peru, 1983 ==
The Second Encuentro was held in Lima from 19 to 22 July 1983. Expecting a crowd of 300 participants, organizers were stunned when over 600 women arrived. The group contained representatives from Argentina, Brazil, Bolivia, Chile, Colombia, the Dominican Republic, Ecuador, Mexico, and Puerto Rico, as well as many women living in exile in England, Spain, Switzerland and the United States. Based on the theme "Patriarchy in Latin America", topics included economic development; empowerment; family; feminist history, literature and research; health; sexual violence; and sexuality. Though no specific program to address lesbian issues and lesbophobia was planned, Claudia Hinojosa, Juanita Ramos (Juanita Díaz-Cotto) with other lesbians organized a workshop, which was attended by around 200 participants. It was one of the first region-wide forums where issues were openly discussed and created the foundations of bonding Latina lesbians into support networks to work for their inclusion. Another unplanned topic emerged with the participation of the exiles and a letter read from a political prisoner from Bolivia. The discussion broadened to encompass women who were harassed and arrested for attempting to organize workers.

As with the previous conference, the polarization between whether women should create their own spaces or integrate with male-dominated spaces sparked debate and there was discussion on whether classism and the need to eliminate the struggle in social hierarchy was more important that gender struggle. Because the perception lingered that feminists represented white and mestiza, middle-class values, conflicts erupted with those who made up the majority of women working in the movement, i.e. poor, working-class, and indigenous, Afro-Caribbean or Afro-Latina. State oppression and rampant poverty, had politicized many women who had previously been ignored in the fight for women's rights. In response to their dire economic situation, human rights abuses, and political repression, these more radical constituencies demanded to be heard and included in strategies.

== Third Encounter, Bertioga, Brazil, 1985 ==
The Third Encuentro was held in Bertioga, a municipality in the state of São Paulo in 1985. Representatives came from fourteen Latin American countries, as well as from Canada, Europe, the Netherlands Antilles and the United States with over 850 women in attendance. Coming in the midst of the Latin American debt crisis, CIA interference and U. S. military involvement in Latin America and the Caribbean, tensions at the conference were high. The question of inclusion was brought to the fore when a group of shanty town women from Rio de Janeiro arrived and asked to be admitted without paying the registration fee. Some thought they had been commandeered to attend to make a political statement about exclusion.

In spite of the controversies, there were inclusionary programs added to the overall agenda such as workshops for the first time held on racism and one held to discuss Nicaragua and the Sandinista Revolution. Lesbianism was included as part of the official conference programs and a series of workshops were held on lesbian issues. Out of the conference, the idea for the First Latin American and Caribbean Lesbian Feminist Encuentro was born. The event was planned to take place in Cuernavaca, Mexico, one week before the Fourth Encuentro.

== Fourth Encounter, Taxco, Mexico, 1987 ==
The Fourth Encuentro was held in Taxco, in Mexico's Guerrero state in 1987 and was attended by over 1,500 women, many of whom came from adjoining Central America and were new to the concepts of feminism. Debate over who was a feminist intensified with those who had a long history in the movement frustrated at the lack of understanding of the grassroots activists who had recently joined in the dialogue. Those on the opposite side of the debate drew up a document outlining the "myths of the feminist movement", which became an important tool in the ongoing discussions of inclusion. The ten myths included: 1. feminists are uninterested in power, 2. feminists practice politics in other ways, 3. all feminists are the same, 4. women are naturally united because of their gender, 5. feminism is only a policy of women towards women, 6. the movement is only small groups of women, 7. having specified spaces for women guarantees processes will be positive, 8. feminists apologize for being woman, 9. personal feminism is automatically political, and 10. consensus is democracy. By reiterating their differences and discussing them, there was recognition that the myths were the source of frustration and that their diversity did not necessarily divide their purpose. By acknowledging that it was not necessary for them to select a hegemonic path nor a homogeneous one, they were able to resolve the differences between them and recognize that feminism wasn't a concept that could be possessed or owned by any one group and that greater inclusion expanded their reach.

== Fifth Encounter, San Bernardo, Argentina, 1990 ==
The Fifth Encuentro was held in San Bernardo del Tuyú in 1990 with around 3,200 participants. There was a marked increase in the number of networks throughout the region confirming that identity strategies had replaced the previous discussion of whether feminism should move forward in autonomous groups. The lesbian feminist network which had formed at an earlier conference and the Latin American and Caribbean Black Women's Network formed in San Bernardo, were two of the organizations striving to build solidarity with the feminist movement through addressing the specific areas of marginalization. Organized by a committee of Argentines and Uruguayans, the event was planned to take place at the union hall of the Argentine Federation of Light and Power Workers (es) (Spanish: Federación Argentina de Trabajadores de Luz y Fuerza), but the venue was canceled abruptly for political reasons. Instead the community opened doors to malls, gyms, cafés, hotel lobbies and meeting rooms to facilitate the women.

The focus of the meeting were the challenges and responses to those challenges for feminism in the 1990s, with an acknowledgement that diversity enriched the movement, but in turn caused complexity and conflicts. Specific topics on building bridges with other social actors, and political perspectives and strategies. These main topics led to discussion on a variety of issues, including culture, daily life, education, economics, health, identity, labor, power, sexuality and other issues. One of the most central challenges addressed was violence against women and a march was held on September 24 supporting an anti-violence stance. Four days later, a second march with more than five thousand women participants mobilized to declare September 28 as the Day of the Right to Abortion. They called not only for the decriminalization of abortion, but also for abolishing laws which punished women who had abortions.

== Sixth Encounter, Costa del Sol, El Salvador, 1993 ==
The Sixth Encuentro was held in Costa del Sol, El Salvador in 1993 and was plagued by attempts from conservative factions in El Salvador to shut down the conference. A right-wing magazine called Gente claimed that all of the participants were lesbian and "possibly infected with AIDs" and several participants received death threats. The 1,500 participants showed up anyway and there were no violent incidents. The attempt to stop the encuentro had the opposite effect, bringing publicity and recognition to the women's struggle for equality and a life free from violence. For the first time, Afro-Caribbean women attended as did Andean indigenous women. Through the various workshops, the women focused on methods to incorporate women's diversity in building the movement and avenues to work inside and outside patriarchal systems.

Having thought the issue of whether feminism was an elitist movement was behind them, participants reminded of the divide when women from poverty-stricken, rural environments complained about the posh accommodations. In addition, coming just after the end of the Salvadoran Civil War, revolutionary dogmatism resurfaced and organizers worked to regain ground about inclusiveness. A major development at the conference was the discussion of preparation for the World Conference on Women, 1995 to be held in Beijing. Many of the participant at the encuentro were unaware of the UN Decade for Women and were fearful of accepting money from United States Agency for International Development (USAID) to attend, given the interventionist US policies in Latin America of the past. They were in agreement that the NGO Forum leader should not be the conservative Chilean businesswoman who had been appointed to head the Latin discussion in Beijing, but were not in agreement with the way that some members had gone about replacing the Chilean with a feminist without bringing nominations to the group at large. Overall, enthusiasm to participate in Beijing was high and participants left the conference making plans to attend.

== Seventh Encounter, Cartagena, Chile, 1996 ==
The Seventh Encuentro was held in Cartagena, Chile in 1996 and was best by internal struggles. A small group of autonomist feminists, as opposed to women working within institutions, were in charge, as a broader range of Chilean feminists had been unwilling to work with the organizing committee. The conference was boycotted by the majority of Chilean feminists and attendance was significantly lower than previous events. Estimates vary on the participation, but generally agree there were less than 700 delegates, principally because the organizing group refused to include anyone they deemed to be insufficiently feminist, branding those who had integrated with government organizations or formalized their organization as sell-outs to patriarchy and capitalism.

Three themes had been selected, political and philosophical frameworks; invisibility and discrimination; and strategies for change; however, the rigidity of the organizers, allowing only prepared papers to be read without discussion or participation were seen by many as violating the spirit of the encuentros. A group of 300-400 women split off from the designated discussion sessions, forming a third group calling themselves "neither one or the other" and tried to find a way to solve the polarization. To this group, whether an NGO did or did not have funding, was or was not official or was grassroots, was irrelevant, if they could forward the transformation of women's lives and society. The combative style of the autonomists and their personal attacks, prohibited discussion on issues with which the majority of participants were concerned. Despite the divides, planning was set for another conference three years hence.

== Eighth Encounter, Juan Dolio, Dominican Republic, 1999 ==
The Eighth Encuentro was held in Juan Dolio in the Dominican Republic in November 1999. Organizers pushed the dissension of the previous conference into the background, focusing instead on building feminist camaraderie. Focusing on feminine values and a dynamic cultural interaction, including theater, dance and art, Dominican organizers were able to bridge divides. In addition, the conference, the first one with wide participation of non-Hispanic Caribbean women brought together nearly 1,300 participants to discuss the themes of domination of women, the dynamics of power relationships, and forging regional alliances.

The sharing of "herstories" and the Dominican organizers' goal of creating space for both those who wanted to experience shared time with other women and those who wanted to strategize served as a healing process for participants. The conference was not without conflict, as the relationship between Dominican and Haitian women and the intense racism faced by Haitians living in the Dominican Republic spilled into the conference. Some Haitian participants felt they were marginalized because of inadequate translation services at the conference. But in the tone of reconciliation, petitions were circulated to protest deportation of Haitian immigrants. The encuentro also pointed to the divide between members of the Anglo-, Francophone and Hispanic Caribbean, not only in terms of language, but in terms of inclusion and the diaspora, as it opened conversation on whether Caribbeans living abroad were seen as elites.

== Ninth Encounter, Playa Tambor, Costa Rica, 2002 ==
The Ninth Encuentro was held in Playa Tambor, Costa Rica from 1–5 December 2002 on the theme of "Active Resistance in the Face of Neoliberal Globalization". The event was attended by 820 women representing 20 countries from throughout the region. As had been seen in the previous encuentro there was little participation from the Anglo- and Franco-Caribbean and surprisingly little attendance by indigenous women; however, the organizers learned from the previous conference and provided translation services at all group sessions from Spanish into English, French and Portuguese. A novel approach had been taken to financing the conference and for the first time, fees were not the main source of revenues and constituted only one-third of the revenues. For the first time, funds from such organizations as the Global Fund for Women, Mama Cash, UNIFEM and other funding organizations were utilized to make up a third of the cost with the final one-third coming from fundraising.

The women evaluated both the negative and positive aspects of globalization, providing greater opportunities to women and simultaneously harming them. For example, improved communications technologies have allowed women to have greater communication with others in the movement and expand their message and yet, it is difficult for women to find funding for initiatives. Economically and politically, they noted the double standard using financial resources to simultaneously support conflict and social improvement, the problem of policies which reinforce patriarchy and the continued effects of poverty and violence, which spiraling national debt caused by neoliberalism has acerbated.

== Tenth Encounter, Serra Negra, Brazil, 2005 ==
The Tenth Encuentro was held in Serra Negra in 2005 and was made up of more than 1,250 participants from 26 countries. The theme of the event was "Radicalization of feminism, radicalization of democracy" and evaluated whether democracy could eliminate discrimination and inequalities with its patriarchal structure. There was discussion of how taking on identities such as Black, mestiza, lesbian, among others is a political statement, challenging the cultural norms. Acknowledging the identity is both empowering and leads to anguish. Recognizing that the promise of democracy was government by the people, which left women out, created a disproportionate impoverishment and led to discrimination, which can only be expunged if women actively participate and demand their autonomy.

It was the first of the conferences to discuss in-depth the diversity of age, ethnicity, race and sexual identity and how those differences alter the complexities involved in developing a feminist strategy. Debate included evaluating feminist racism, power, and representation of research subjects and their objectification. There was also a recognition that women's rights, or even human rights, as defined by the dominant culture, are practiced in the realm of exclusion. Because of the patriarchal nature of rights and law, only men have been fully legally protected. The challenge for feminists is to develop means that their own autonomy and collective rights are protected and valued.

== Eleventh Encounter, Mexico City, Mexico, 2009 ==
The Eleventh Encuentro was held in Mexico City from March 16 to 20, 2009, with approximately 1,600 participants. Many of the issues from the previous encuentro were brought to the fore, including a session in which indigenous women discussed their objectification, as well as the issues of autonomy and accepting funding from governmental type agencies which are patriarchal.

New issues at the conference were the inclusion of trans-women which some felt had been included without input from the collective group and the issue of using sexual violence to subdue opposition in armed conflict. Repudiation of femicide and ongoing violence against women was not a new theme, but developing strategies to protect women in conflict situations and keeping the situation from being buried became a focal point.

== Twelfth Encounter, Bogotá, Colombia, 2011 ==
The Twelfth Encuentro was held in Bogotá, from 23 to 26 November 2011 with around 1,200 in attendance. For the first time, the group was split with autonomous feminists attending sessions from the 18 to 21 November and then the traditional encuentro occurring at the later date with institutional feminists as well as autonomists. Topics discussed included inclusion of trans-women, abortion, armed conflict, social class, ecology, race, refugees, and sexuality, among others. The contentious discussions of whether utilizing funds from patriarchal institutions undermined feminism were discussed again. Many felt that as long as there is transparency, the use of such funding sources did not compromise the struggles.

== Thirteenth Encounter, Lima, Peru, 2014 ==
The Thirteenth Encuentro was held in Lima, from 22 to 25 November 2014. The topics of the three main sessions were interculturality and intersectionality, sustainable life, and the body and territory. For each session a seminar was organized and discussion followed. The sessions discussed a multitude of issues, such as how to maintain one's identity and economic productivity when patriarchal systems devalue women's contributions, whether binary categories of sexuality are limiting to a full discussion of feminism, finding balance between men and women as well as between humans and nature, marginalization, political participation, among others. The discussion surrounding the intersectionality showed how feminism and creating strategy for policy overlaps and affects peasants, intellectuals, diverse sexualities, different classes, races, making it imperative that all diversity have a place in the discussion. At this conference, there was a full incorporation of trans-women for the first time and a discussion on the recognition of sex workers.

Tensions were present, in that Afro-Latina and Afro-Caribbean women felt left out of the discussions. Another polarizing issue was whether the next encuentro should take place in Bolivia or Uruguay. Both sides had supporters and detractors, one side saying that Bolivia would serve to emphasize the marginalization of indigenous women and the other with the view that all women are marginalized and one group should not be given more emphasis than another. Another question concerning the location was the cost and preparedness. In the final vote, Uruguay won the nod.
