= List of artworks commemorating African Americans in Washington, D.C. =

Artworks commemorating African-Americans in Washington, D.C. is a group of fourteen public artworks in Washington, D.C., including the Martin Luther King, Jr. Memorial dedicated in 2011, that commemorate African Americans. When describing thirteen of these that predate the King Memorial, Jacqueline Trescott wrote for The Washington Post:

In a city crowded with memorials and monuments, few represent the individual struggles of African American pioneers or salute the contributions of black citizens.

Trescott reported that four additional commemorative works also include representations of African Americans.

== List ==
Trescott reported that the following works commemorate African Americans. [[]]Octavius Catto

- A. Philip Randolph bust, by Ed Dwight, in Union Station
- Emancipation Memorial, by Thomas Ball featuring Abraham Lincoln and a newly freed slave, in Lincoln Park
- (Here I Stand) In the Spirit of Paul Robeson, by Allen Uzikee Nelson, Petworth neighborhood, at the intersection of Georgia Avenue, Varnum Street, and Kansas Avenue
- Josh Gibson, full-size statue, Omri Amrany and Julie Rotblatt-Amrany. Nationals Park
- Lady Fortitude, by James King, at Howard University
- Dr. King bust by John Wilson, in the United States Capitol Rotunda
- Mary McLeod Bethune Memorial, by Robert Berks, life-sized statue, Lincoln Park
- Negro Mother and Child, by Maurice Glickman, in the basement courtyard of the Interior Department, C Street and 18th Street, N.W.
- Spirit of Freedom: African American Civil War Memorial, by Ed Hamilton, at 10th Street and U Street, N.W.
- Bust of Sojourner Truth, by Artis Lane, in the Capitol Visitor Center
- Saint Martin de Porres statue, by Thomas McGlynn, Our Lady of Perpetual Help Catholic Church, 1600 Morris Road, S.E.
- The Progress of the Negro Race, by Daniel Gillette Olney, a terra cotta frieze, Langston Terrace Dwellings, 21st Street and Benning Road N.E.
- The Shaw Memorial, by Augustus Saint-Gaudens, patinated plaster cast for a sculpture, National Gallery of Art. The cast's inscription reads: ROBERT GOULD SHAW – KILLED WHILE LEADING THE ASSAVLT ON FORT WAGNER JVLY TWENTY THIRD EIGHTEEN HVNDRED AND SIXTY THREE.

== Additional representations of African Americans ==
Trescott reported that the following memorials contain additional representations of African Americans.

- The Vietnam Veterans Memorial, by Frederick E. Hart.
- The Korean War Veterans Memorial, by Frank Gaylord II.
- The Franklin Delano Roosevelt Memorial, overall design by Lawrence Halprin.
- The Vietnam Women's Memorial, by Glenna Goodacre.

== Photo gallery ==
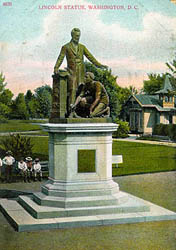
Emancipation Memorial

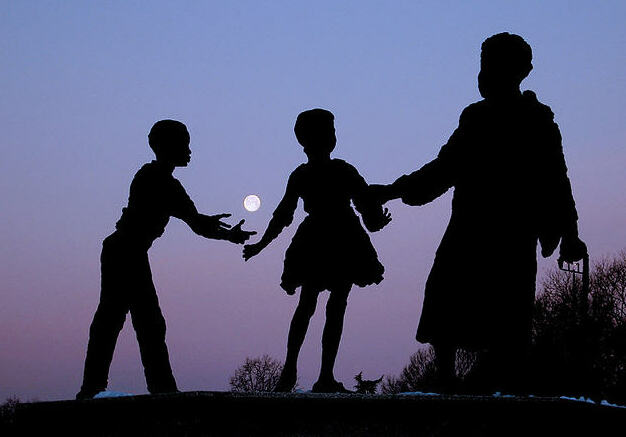
Mary McLeod Bethune sculpture

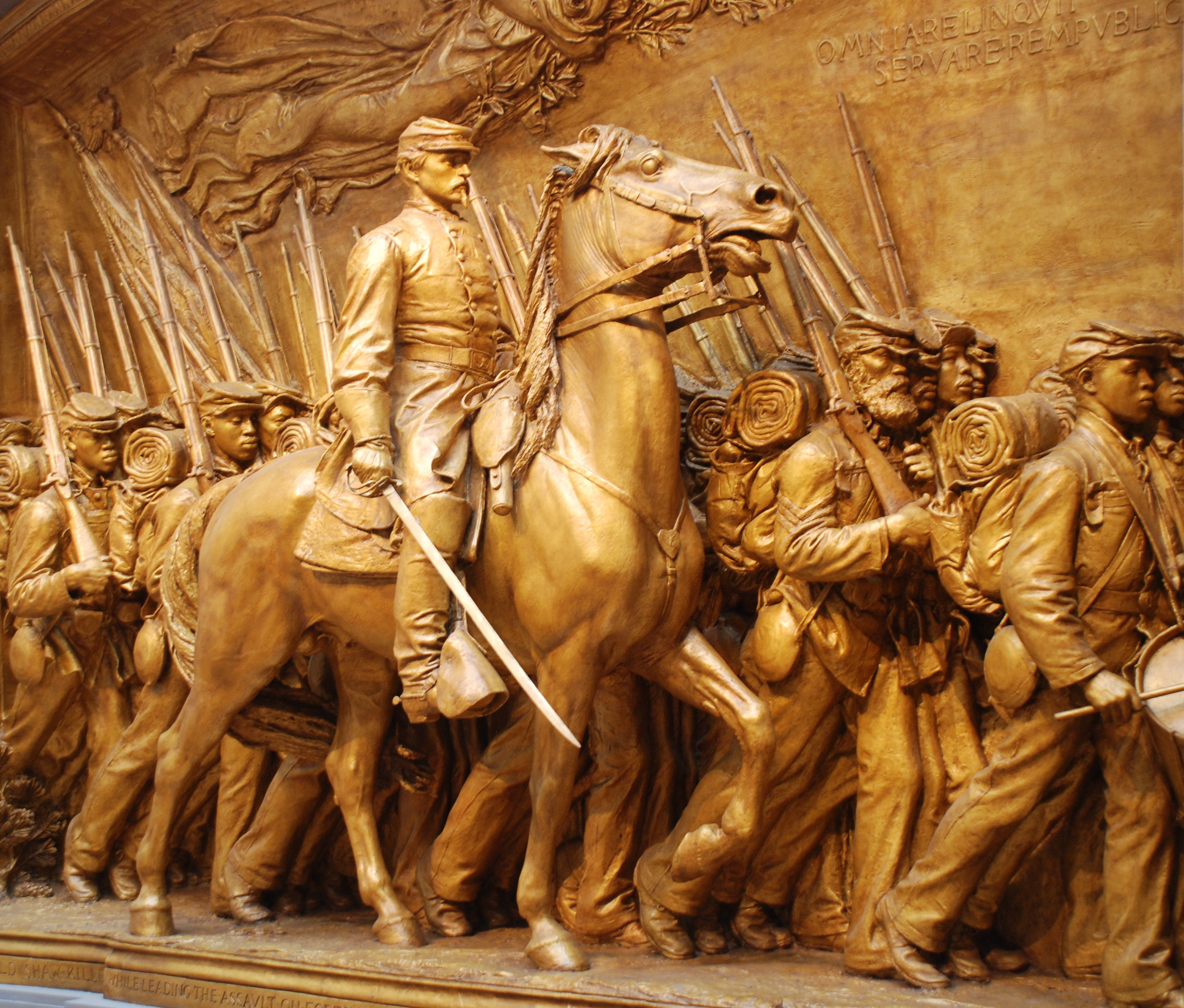
Shaw Memorial

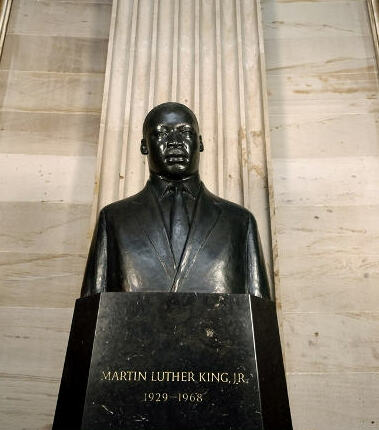
Martin Luther King, Jr. bust in Capitol Rotunda

== See also ==
- Rosa Parks (National Statuary Hall)
- Frederick Douglass (Capitol Building)
- Marion Barry (Washington City Council Building)
- Cornerstones of History
- List of African-American historic places in the District of Columbia

African American:

- List of museums focused on African Americans
- List of streets named after Martin Luther King Jr.
