= Bust of Sojourner Truth (U.S. Capitol) =

Bust in Washington, D.C., U.S.

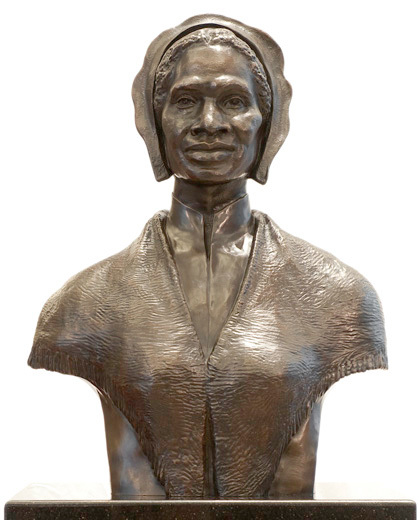
- Year: 2009
- Type: Bronze sculpture
- Location: Washington, D.C., United States; 38.889°N 77.008°W
- Owner: Architect of the Capitol

Sojourner Truth is a public artwork by Canadian sculptor Artis Lane, located in Emancipation Hall at the United States Capitol Visitor Center in Washington, D.C. It was the first statue honoring an African-American woman in the U.S. Capitol building.

== Description ==
The over-life-size bust of Sojourner Truth shows her in a cap and shawl similar to those in which she was often photographed. She is depicted with a smile suggesting confidence and determination. The sculpture was cast in bronze.

== History ==
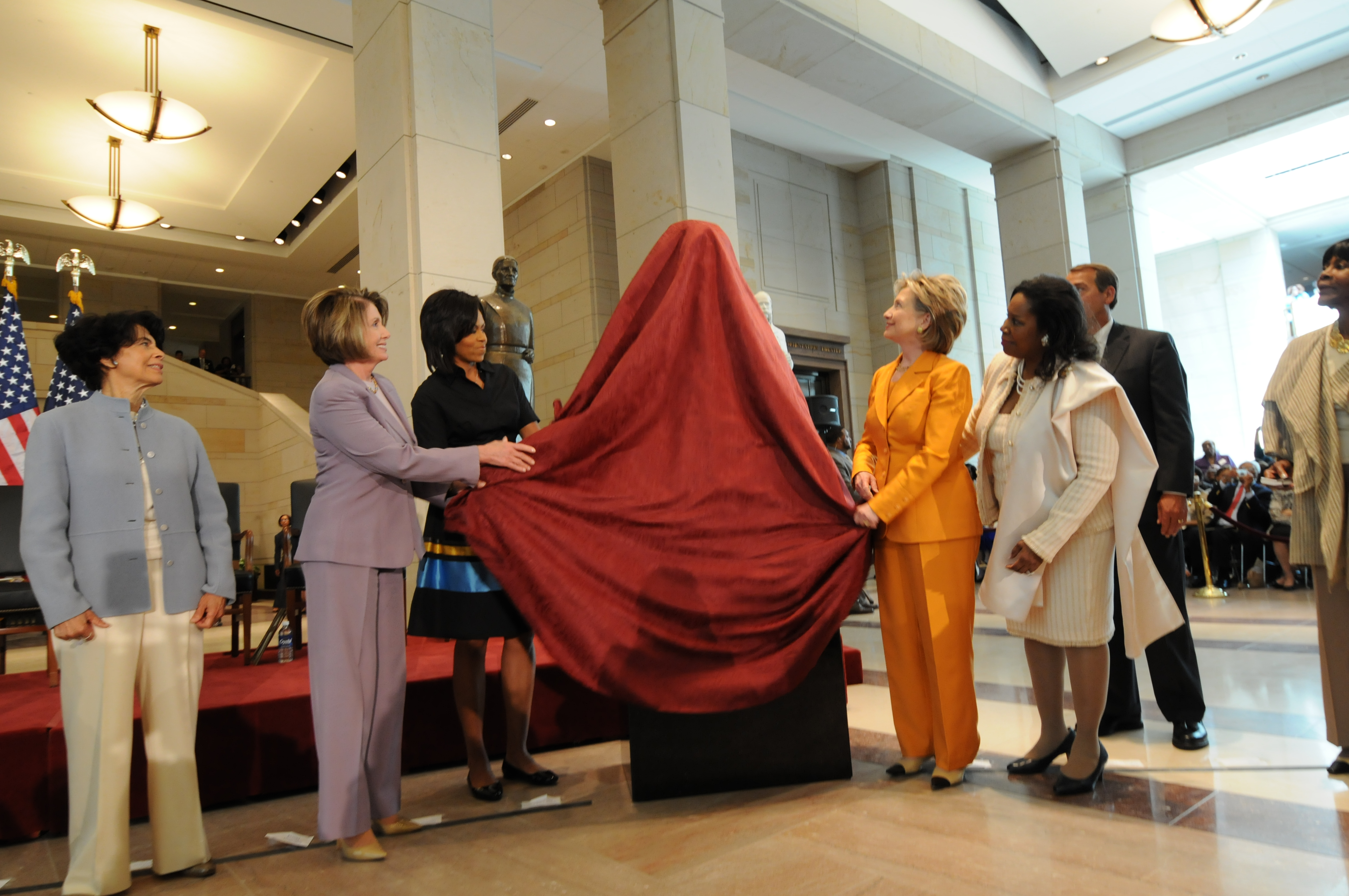
(L–R) Artis Lane, Nancy Pelosi, Michelle Obama and Hillary Clinton at the unveiling of the bust

The sculpture was unveiled on April 28, 2009, in Emancipation Hall in the Capitol Visitor Center. It was the first sculpture of an African-American woman to be on display in the Capitol. First Lady Michelle Obama, Speaker of the House Nancy Pelosi, Secretary of State Hillary Clinton, and Representative Sheila Jackson Lee were among those who offered remarks at the unveiling. Representative Lee introduced the bill, House Congressional Resolution 86, that led to the establishment of a statue to Truth in the Capitol. The National Congress of Black Women was a major contributor; they raised funds over many years to underwrite the bust.

== See also ==
- Artworks commemorating African Americans in Washington, D.C.
- List of public art in Washington, D.C.
