= Statue of Josh Gibson =

Statue in Washington, D.C., U.S.

Josh Gibson
- Artist: Omri Amrany
- Year: 2009
- Medium: Bronze
- Subject: Josh Gibson
- Location: Nationals Park; Washington, D.C., United States; 38°52′26.5″N 77°0′27.1″W

Josh Gibson is a public artwork by sculptor Omri Amrany, located at Nationals Park in Washington, D.C., United States.

== Description ==
The statue depicts Negro leagues catcher and Baseball Hall of Fame member Josh Gibson batting.

== Artist ==
Omri Amrany is an Israeli-American best known as a sculptor.

== Information ==
The sculpture was commissioned by the D.C. Commission for The Arts & Humanities and was unveiled at Nationals Park, on April 8, 2009, by the Gibson Family.

== See also ==
- Artworks commemorating African Americans in Washington, D.C.
