= National Congress of Black Women =

Non-profit Organization

National Congress of Black Women, Inc.
- Abbreviation: NCBW
- Formation: 1984
- Founders: C. DeLores Tucker; Shirley Chisholm
- Type: Nonprofit organization
- Tax ID no.: 501(c)(3)
- Legal status: Active
- Headquarters: United States

The National Congress of Black Women, Inc. (NCBW) is a 501(c)(3) nonprofit organization founded in 1984, dedicated to the educational, political, economic and cultural development of African American women and their families. NCBW also serves as a non-partisan voice and instrument on issues pertaining to the appointment of African American women at all levels of government, and to increase African American women's participation in the educational, political, economic and social arenas. Currently, NCBW provides opportunities for women for leadership and decision-making positions in government, nonprofit organizations and the private sector.

Their mission is to educate youth on the responsibilities of good citizenship and the importance of engaging the political process, while also providing opportunities for internships and other learning experiences at the local, state, national and global levels.

The National Congress of Black Women's founding chairs were Shirley Chisholm and Dr. C. Delores Tucker. Chisholm was an educator, author, and politician. She became the first African American woman elected in Congress in 1968 and in 1972, became the first African American woman to make a serious bid to run for President of the United States. Tucker was the first African American woman to serve as Pennsylvania Secretary of the Commonwealth, and the first African-American woman to serve as secretary of a U.S. state government. Other notable NCBW founders include Dr. Dorothy Height and Coretta Scott King.

The National Congress of Black Women commissioned Artis Lane to create a bronze bust portraying Sojourner Truth, women's-right advocate and abolitionist. The bust was unveiled on April 28, 2009, by First Lady Michelle Obama for permanent display in the Emancipation Hall at the Capitol Visitor Centre. Acclaimed actress Cicely Tyson performed Truth's "Ain't I a Woman?" speech.

The founding members included Hon. C. DeLores Tucker, Convening Founder Hon. Shirley Chisholm, Chair Emeritus Rev. Willie Barrow, Lezli Baskerville, Esq., Dr. Mary Berry, Hon. Cardiss Collins, Dr. Dorothy I. Height, Hon. Alexis Herman, Hon. Charlene Drew Jarvis, Coretta Scott King, Hon. Gloria Lawlah, Hon. Hilda Mason, Jewell Jackson McCabe, Hon. Eleanor Holmes Norton, Lavonia Perryman Fairfax, Johnnie Scott Rice (Washington, DC), Hon. Wilhelmina J. Rolark, Esq., Hon. Mary Terrell, Esq., Pat Tyson, Hon. Shirley Wilcher, and Hon. Nadine Winter.

During the 2010s, the group's funding and membership decreased. On November 4, 2021, eight former board members filed a lawsuit against former organization president E. Faye Williams, accusing her of using organization funds for her personal enrichment. Board members were strategically replaced when it had been requested that an inspection be conducted in accordance with DC Code 29 413.05, Inspection of Records by Directors.
