= Statue of Frederick Douglass (U.S. Capitol) =

Statue in Washington, D.C., U.S.

Frederick Douglass
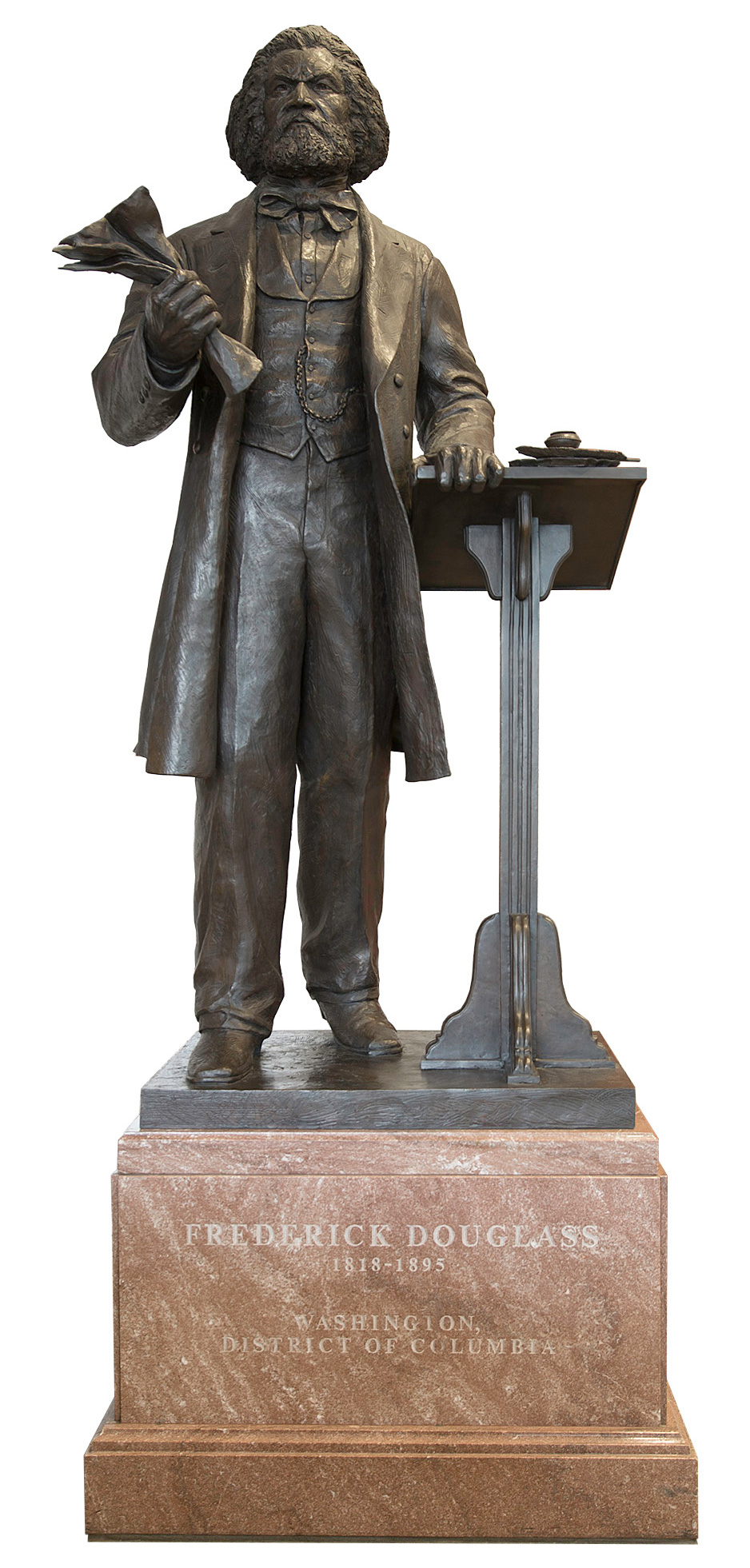
- Artist: Steven Weitzman
- Year: 2013
- Medium: Bronze sculpture
- Subject: Frederick Douglass

Frederick Douglass is a 2013 bronze sculpture depicting the American abolitionist and politician of the same name by Steven Weitzman, installed in the United States Capitol Visitor Center's Emancipation Hall, in Washington, D.C.

== See also ==
- 2013 in art
- List of artworks commemorating African Americans in Washington, D.C.
