= Housing in Washington, D.C. =

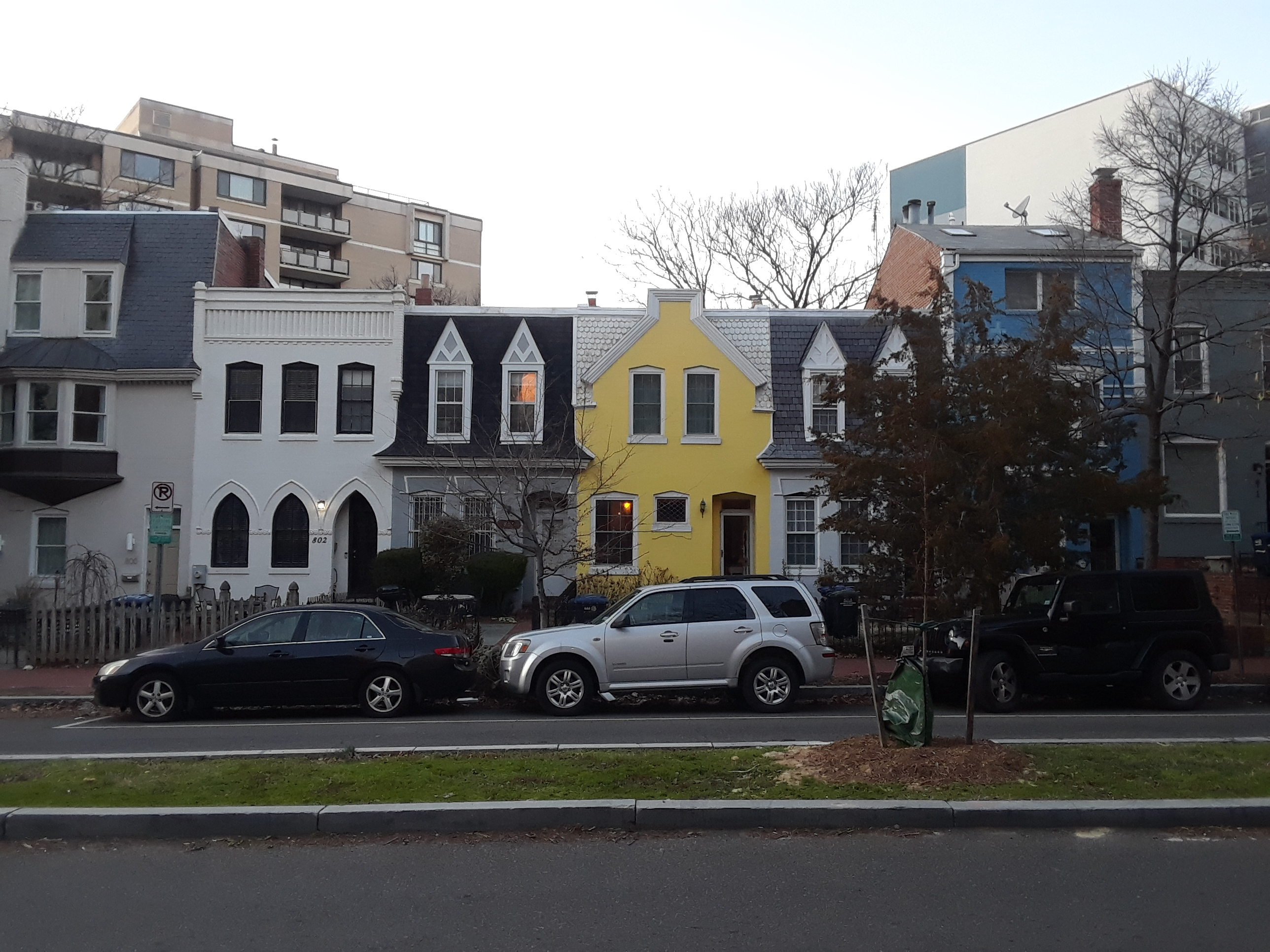
Rowhouses in D.C.'s Foggy Bottom neighborhood, an example of residential architecture in Washington, D.C.

Housing in Washington, D.C., encompasses a variety of shelter types: apartments, single family homes, condominiums, co-ops, and apartments considered public housing. Washington, D.C., is considered one of the most expensive cities in which to live in the United States—in 2019, it was ranked in the top 10 of American cities with the most expensive homes.

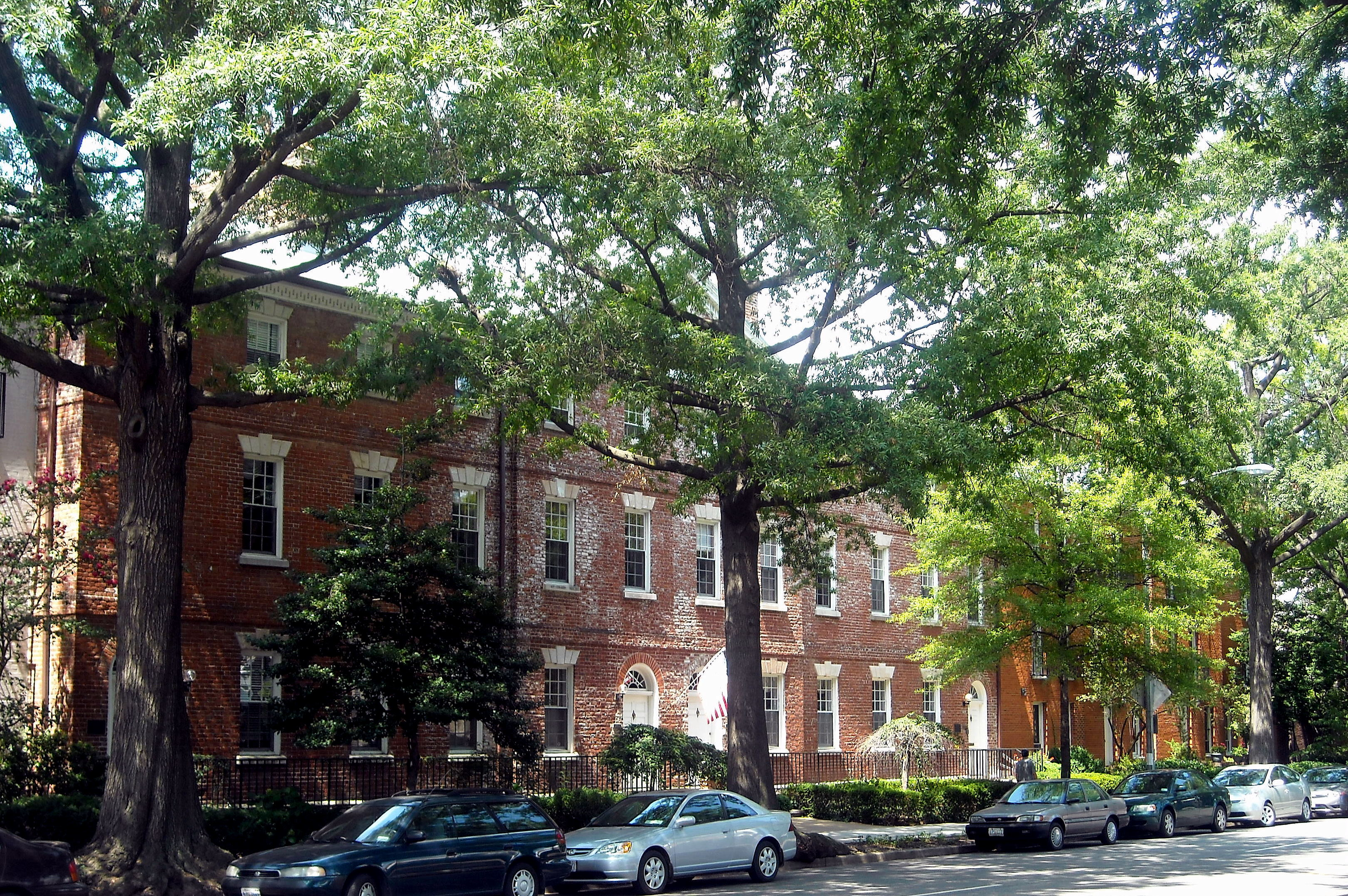
Built in 1794-5, Wheat Row is the earliest group of rowhouses in Washington, D.C.

== History ==
The oldest residential house in Washington, D.C., was built in 1754, and originally located in Danvers, Massachusetts. The home was dismantled, shipped to D.C. by railcar and reconstructed in the Kalorama neighborhood.

Residential homes throughout the city were built in a variety of architectural styles, including Georgian, Federal, Victorian, Tudor Revival, Beaux-Arts, Arts and Crafts, Bungalow, Colonial, and contemporary.

Racial segregation

Black settlement was legally barred in many areas of Washington, D.C., through the first half of the 20th century due to racially restrictive deed covenants which barred Black home seekers from purchasing. By the 1920s, neighborhood associations would gather signatures to place such racially restrictive covenants on the properties of signers, which would restrict entire neighborhoods. Neighborhoods like Mount Pleasant and Bloomingdale were particularly affected. Further, Black homebuyers routinely overpaid for homes in the city, and integrated neighborhoods were rare.

As of 1960, the segregation was deeply felt—2.2% of new houses in the city were available to Black residents. Washington, D.C., introduced policies to prohibit discrimination in 1964.

=== Neighborhood advocacy groups ===
There have been a number of groups formed to combat housing segregation in Washington, D.C., In 1958, an interracial group of residents of the Manor Park neighborhood created the Neighbors Inc. group to encourage the integration of their neighborhood—particularly attracting white residents. Other such advocacy groups that lobbied for integrated neighborhoods and changes in housing policy included Northwest Washington Fair Housing, Suburban Maryland Fair Housing, Prince George's County Fair Housing, and Northern Virginia Fair Housing.

== Affordability ==
Median home value in Washington, D.C., as of 2020, was $617,900, making the city the #4 most expensive in the country. Rents and mortgages are 2.8 times higher than the national average. The median rent in 2018 was $1,487.

== Public housing ==
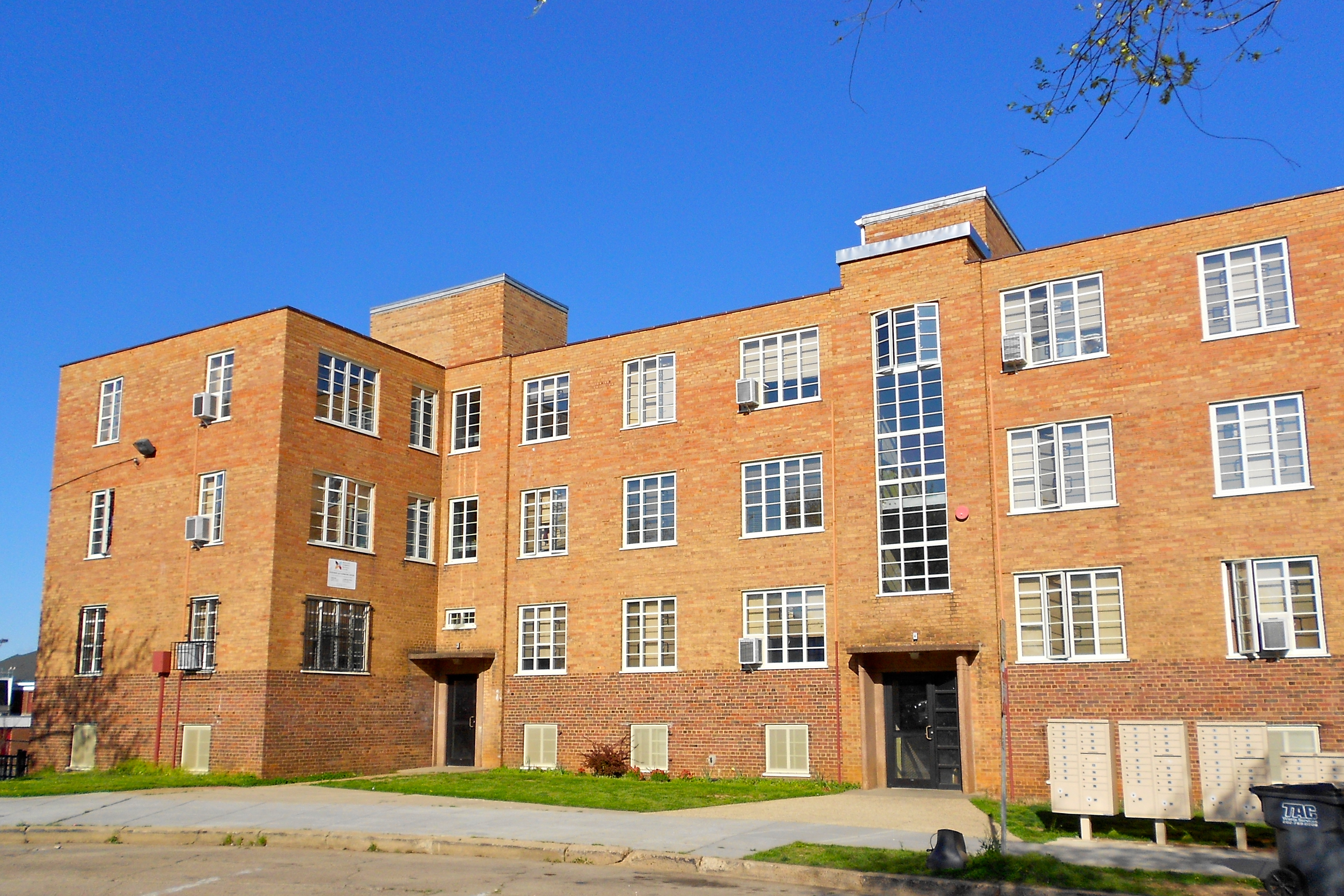
Langston Terrace Dwellings, an all-Black community in Washington, D.C. and the second public housing building in the nation.

Public housing appeared in Washington, D.C., after the passage of the National Housing Act in 1934. Langston Terrace Dwellings, an all-Black community with 274 units built from 1935 to 1938, was the nation's second public housing project undertaken in the country. Hilyard Robinson, a Black architect and Washington native, designed the building. The Langston Terrace Dwellings were added to the DC Inventory of Historic Sites in 1986 and the National Register of Historic Places in 1987.

== Homelessness ==
The homeless population decreased by 5.5% from 2018 to 2019, according to the Joint Center for Housing Studies at Harvard University. In 2019, there were a reported 6,521 people experiencing homelessness in Washington, D.C. In 2021, Washington D.C., had the highest rate of homelessness, having 90.4 homeless persons per 10,000 people.
