= David Williston =

David A. Williston (1868–1962) was the first professionally trained African American landscape architect in the United States. He designed many campuses for historically black colleges and universities, including Tuskegee University. He also taught horticulture and landscape architecture.

== Early life and education ==
Williston was born in 1868 in Fayetteville, North Carolina, and was the second of thirteen children. He graduated Howard University Normal School in 1895, then enrolled at Cornell University to study agriculture under Liberty Hyde Bailey. At Cornell, he wrote his senior thesis on atmospheric drainage. Williston was the first African American to graduate Cornell University with a degree in agriculture (B.S. 1898), and one of the first African Americans to graduate from Cornell in any discipline. He later completed courses on municipal engineering at the International Correspondence School in Pennsylvania.

== Career ==
Williston taught at several historically black colleges, starting at the State College of North Carolina at Greensboro in 1898.

In 1902, he joined the faculty of Tuskegee Institute as a professor of horticulture, where he taught intermittently for 27 years. At Tuskegee he also served as superintendent of buildings and grounds between 1910 and 1929, where he designed the campus master plan and several Tuskegee facilities. He was the landscape architect for the 99th Pursuit Squadron Training School, where the Tuskegee Airmen were based.

He was a lifelong friend of George Washington Carver, who also taught at Tuskegee. Booker T. Washington's home The Oaks was constructed by students as part of the Tuskegee curriculum, and Williston guided students in the landscape design of the home.

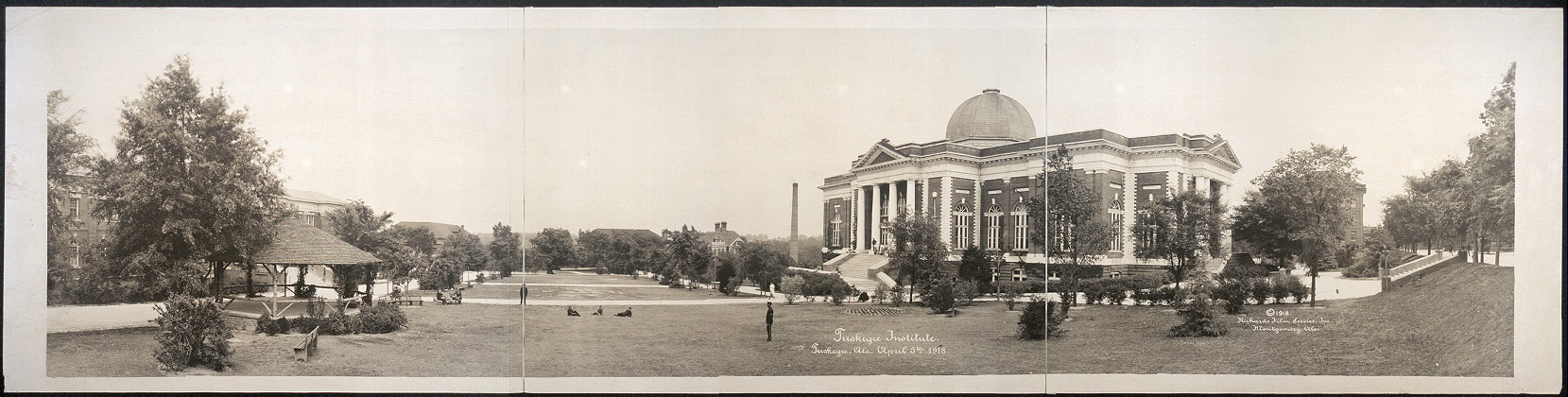
Panorama of Tuskegee Institute campus (1918)

== Later career ==
In 1930, Williston moved to Washington D.C. where he opened a landscape architecture firm, believed to be the first African-American-owned landscape architecture firm in the United States. Williston continued to teach and practice landscape architecture, and planned the campuses of dozens of historically black colleges. His clients included Fisk University, Tennessee Agricultural and Industrial, Clark University, Alcorn State University, Lane College, Philander Smith College, and Howard University, where he worked with Albert Cassell. He also completed landscape design for the Langston Terrace Dwellings between 1935 and 1938.

Williston continued his relationship with Tuskegee; he consulted with the Institute between 1929 and 1948, and introduced a new landscape plan for the campus in 1948.

Williston continued working into his 90s, and died in 1962 at the age of 94.
