= Daniel Gillette Olney =

American sculptor

- Born: August 24, 1909; New York City, US
- Died: July 2, 1980 (aged 70); Veracruz, Mexico
- Education: Yale University; Beaux Arts Institute of Design
- Known for: Sculpture
- Notable work: Langston Terrace Dwellings

Daniel Gillette Olney (August 24, 1909 – July 2, 1980), was an American sculptor active in Washington, D.C., in the 1930s. A native of New York, he is primarily known for his bas-relief panels at the Langston Terrace Dwellings, one of only fourteen works on the list of artworks commemorating African Americans in Washington, D.C.

== Early life and education ==
Olney was born in New York City, on August 24, 1909, the second son of George H. Olney and Amy Olney (née Gillette). Olney graduated from Yale University and attended the Beaux-Arts Institute of Design in New York. During the Second World War, he was a lieutenant with the United States Coast Guard Reserve.

== Notable works ==
In addition to his works at the Langston Terrace Dwellings, Olney sculpted "Lady and Unicorn", in Dumbarton Oaks neighbourhood of Washington, and a relief sculpture for the Berryville Post Office in Berryville, Arkansas.

=== "The Progress of the Negro Race" and "Madonna and Children" ===
Langston Terrace Dwellings, designed by African American architect Hilyard Robinson, was the first public housing project in Washington D.C., and the second in the United States. Olney was commissioned to create a frieze depicting African American history from enslavement to the Great Migration following World War I. Another Olney sculpture, "Madonna and Children", is also located at Langston Terrace Dwellings. Kelly Ann Quinn describes the importance of the Olney's work: "In five major figurative terra-cotta panels, Olney rendered a version of history that traced African Americans from slavery to freedom, through Reconstruction and the Great Migration. The frieze features themes of labor, family, leadership, and urbanization; the narrative arc of this ensemble suggests that progress is predicated on each of these elements".
