= Steven Weitzman (sculptor) =

American sculptor and muralist

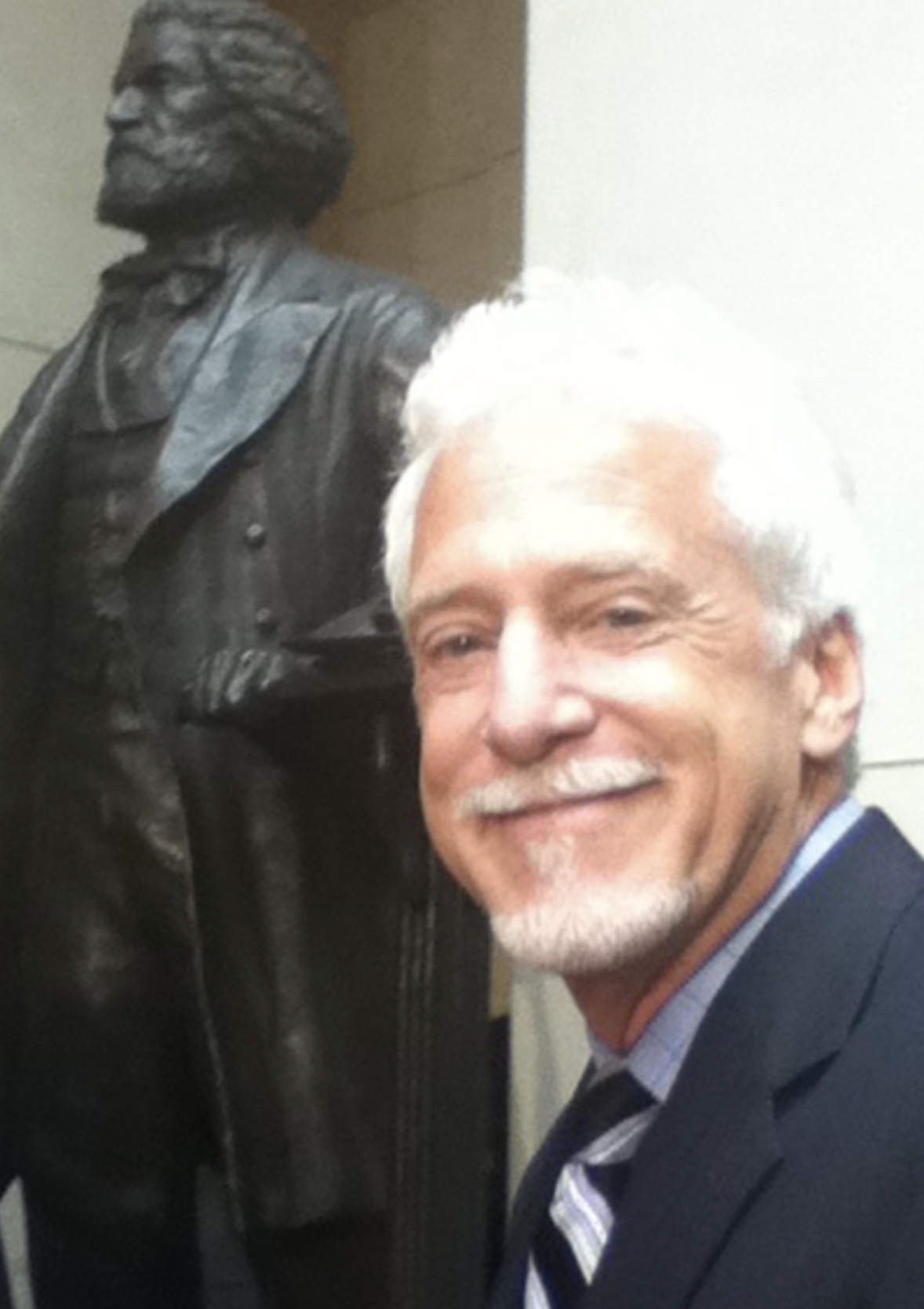
Steven Weitzman standing with his Frederick Douglass statue in the Emancipation Hall of the Capitol Visitor Center.

Steven Weitzman (born 1952) is an American public artist and designer known for his figurative sculptures, murals, and aesthetic designs for highway and bridge infrastructure projects.

Weitzman owns and operates three companies. Weitzman Studios, Inc. was started in 1995 and is through which he creates his public and personal art work, including paintings, prints, drawings and large-scale figurative sculpture. The aesthetic infrastructure design firm, Creative Design Resolutions, Inc. was founded in 1998. Working primarily for Departments of Transportation, the design firm specializes in creating context sensitive solutions, a site-specific and community-oriented approach to transportation-related design that takes into consideration the community values, culture, history and environment of a place. His third company, Creative Form Liners, Inc., also established in 1998, fabricates urethane rubber molds or form liners, as well as full-color concrete and resinous terrazzo, a product line under the name of FŌTERA.

== Early life ==
Steven Weitzman was born in Manhattan, New York, to Martin and Pearl Weitzman. His father, Martin Weitzman, was a multi-disciplinary artist and graphic designer, who worked for the poster design division of the Federal Arts Program under the Workers Progress Administration (WPA). A selection of his posters are in the collection of The Library of Congress, and one, “See America, Welcome to Montana", was included in the United States Postal Services’ collection of WPA Poster stamps. Weitzman's father died when he was nine months old. After his death, Weitzman's mother moved the family from New York to West Los Angeles, CA.

== Career ==
In 1971, at age nineteen, Weitzman moved to Boulder, Colorado where he embarked on a thirteen-year career as a self-taught graphic designer and illustrator for his own commercial studio. After teaching himself to sculpt and carve wood, Weitzman closed his commercial art practice in 1979 to begin a career as a sculptor on an on-commission basis for local governments and civic groups across the United States, including in Maryland, Florida, and Washington, DC for the Friends of the National Zoo. Examples of his early work can be seen in Washington Entertainment Magazine Aug/Sept '90 issue and in the American Forests February 1986 issue, p. 38.

The artist settled in Maryland in 1984, where he started his three companies between 1995-1998 and worked on numerous regional and national public art and urban design projects, most notably the Frederick Douglass sculpture installed in the United States Capitol in 2012; the 1,600 square foot concrete terrazzo mural, The Belvedere, (also known as Chesapeake Journey) located at National Harbor in Maryland, the bronze statue of former mayor of Washington, D.C., Marion S. Barry for the District of Columbia; as well as creating aesthetic master plans for the states of Oklahoma and Ohio.

== Selected works and projects ==
- Frederick Douglass – Weitzman sculpted the approximately seven-feet-tall bronze sculpture of the abolitionist Frederick Douglass currently installed in the Emancipation Hall of the United States Capitol Building in Washington, DC. In 2006, the District of Columbia Commission on the Arts and Humanities commissioned Weitzman to create the Douglass statue. The District wanted the Douglass statue and a statue of Pierre L’Enfant, the architect of Washington, D.C., installed in the Capitol Building's Statuary Hall alongside other sculptures of representatives from each state. Since the District was not a state, it did not have any sculptures of statesmen or women exhibited in the hall. In 2010, Delegate Eleanor Holmes Norton unsuccessfully attempted to pass a bill that would allow the District to place the two statues in the hall to represent the city. Although the bill was approved by the Senate, its momentum was halted by the representatives of the House. In 2012, Delegate Norton and Representative Dan Lungren resubmitted the bill, changing the number of sculptures from two to one, which successfully passed through Congress. After it passed, President Barack Obama then signed off on the bill to add the Douglass to the Capitol's art collection.

On June 19, 2013, five years after its creation, Weitzman's sculpture was dedicated for permanent display in Emancipation Hall in the United States Capitol building. At the ceremony unveiling, Vice President Joe Biden and House Speaker John Boehner took the opportunity to pay tribute to the 19th-century abolitionist and to renew the call for equal voting rights for people who live in the nation's capital.
In 2019, Steven Weitzman was a finalist for the “Call to Artists” competition in a bid to sculpt the Willa Cather statue that would represent Nebraska in the United States Capitol's National Statuary Hall in Washington D.C. As each state is only allowed two sculptures each in the Statuary Hall, Nebraska removed its statue of Julius Sterling Morton, installed in Statuary Hall in 1937, with the new one of Cather.

- Mayor for Life – Weitzman sculpted the eight-foot-tall bronze sculpture of the former civil rights movement activist and mayor of Washington, D.C., Mayor Marion S. Barry. He was commissioned to create the work by the District of Columbia Commission on the Arts and Humanities in 2017. The sculpture is installed in front of the John A. Wilson Building and was dedicated on March 3, 2018.
- The Great Map of Colorado – Weitzman was commissioned by the state of Colorado and Colorado Creative Industries to create this public artwork for the new History Colorado Center in Denver, Colorado. Weitzman made two hundred and thirty-four full-color resinous terrazzo tiles to form a 2,200 square foot topographical map of Colorado, as seen from four hundred miles in space, installed on the main floor of the center's Great Hall. The building, designed by Tryba Architects, was completed in 2012.
- “La Cholla Bridge: Magee Road to Tangerine Road” – In 2010, Weitzman was selected by the Pima Arts Council (née: Arts Foundation of Tucson and Southern Arizona) to create the aesthetic designs for the 600-foot-long (180 m) La Cholla Bridge. The bridge construction was completed in 2014. The project team, including Weitzman's companies Creative Design Resolution, Inc. and Creative Form Liners, Inc. won five team awards for the project within 6 months of its completion.
- I-35 Corridor in Norman, Oklahoma – In 2008, lead designer, Steven Weitzman, and his design firm, Creative Design Resolutions, Inc., was selected to create an aesthetic master plan for the Oklahoma Department of Transportation and the City of Norman's Interstate-35 for the U.S. 77 to SH-9W expansion project. The project included eight bridges, six of them new and two retrofitted. In his aesthetic master plan, Weitzman created designs for each bridge inspired by Oklahoma's and Norman's local flora, fauna, economy, history and environment. The latest bridge to be constructed, Lindsey Street Bridge, was completed in 2017. The Lindsey Street Bridge's aesthetic design features brick patterns, quoining, and a concrete panel that's cast front and back with a bas-relief image of the Seed Sower, an iconic figure of David Ross Boyd, the first president of the University of Oklahoma's Norman nearby campus.
- I-40 Widening and Choctaw Road Interchange Reconstruction Project - In 2016, Weitzman and Creative Design Resolutions, Inc. were hired to design the aesthetic master plan for the eleven-mile, I-40 Corridor, also known as Freedom Freeway, starting from Choctaw Road in Oklahoma City to Tinker Air Force Base. The Oklahoma Department of Transportation's road expansion project includes widening I-40 from four to six lanes and raising the overpass bridges from fourteen to eighteen feet. Additionally, the project will include twenty-six retaining walls ranging in length from 500 to 4,000 feet (150 to 1,220 m); ten new bridges and three renovated bridges that will illustrate the local cultures and aesthetics. The construction started in January 2018 and was expected to take two years to complete.
- The Caretakers - Dedicated in 1986 at the United Nations’ headquarters in New York City, The Caretakers commemorated the UN's fortieth anniversary and its first "International Youth Year". Carved from a two-hundred-year-old American Elm, the sculpture depicts three young people nurturing a newly planted tree. After a two-month exhibition at UN headquarters in New York, The Caretakers was re-dedicated in the Montgomery County Courthouse where it remained for thirty-three years.
