= Negro Mother and Child =

1934 New Deal sculpture by Maurice Glickman

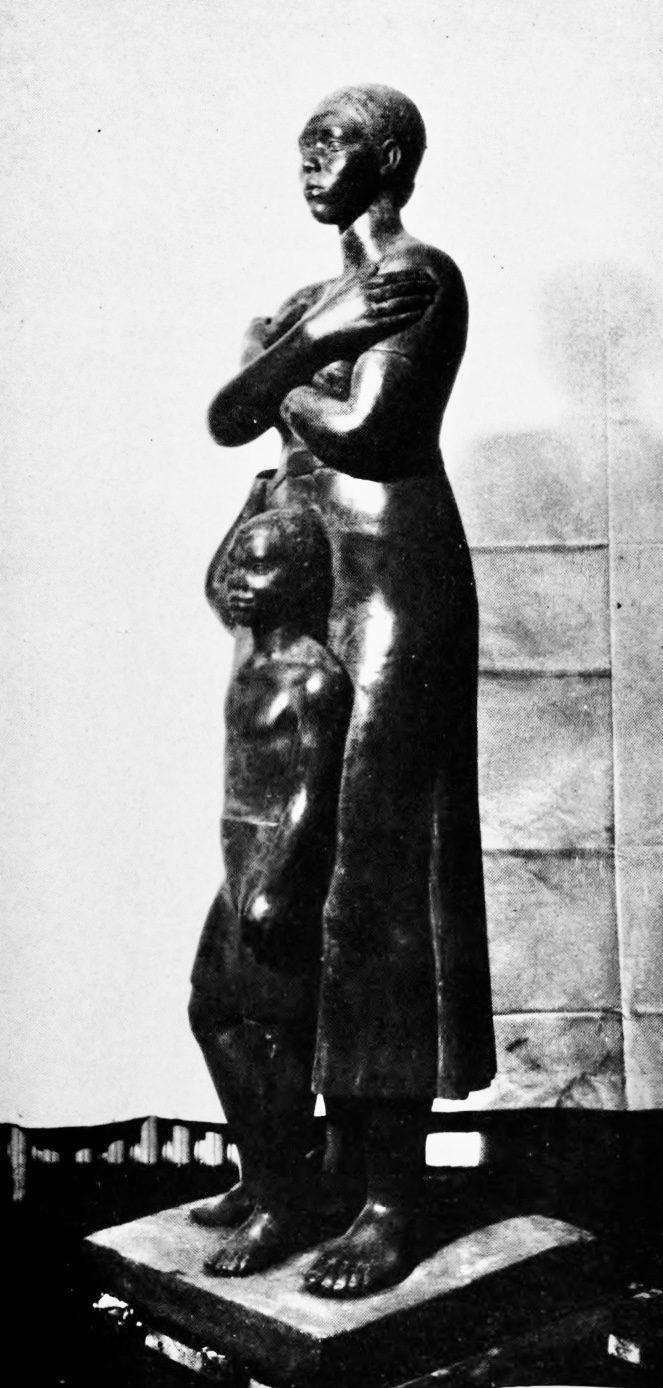
- Negro Mother and Child cast in bronze, photographed 1934
- Artist: Maurice Glickman
- Year: 1934
- Dimensions: 190 cm × 51 cm × 51 cm (76 in × 20 in × 20 in)
- Location: Washington, D.C.
- Owner: U.S. government (IAS 08870002)

Negro Mother and Child is a 1934 sculpture by American artist Maurice Glickman (1906–1981). The New Deal artwork was produced under the early Public Works of Art Project and later installed in a courtyard at the Main Interior Building in Washington, D.C.

This sculpture appeared in a Corcoran Gallery exhibition of PWAP artworks in Washington, D.C. President and Mrs. Roosevelt attended the gala opening of the show on Tuesday, April 24, 1934. Edward A. Jewell, the New York Times art critic, called Negro Mother and Child "the exhibition's one outstanding piece of sculpture...a work of remarkable insight and plastic strength." It was one of just 11 sculptures exhibited at the 600-piece exhibition and "unquestionably stole the show."

Reportedly, when Franklin Delano Roosevelt saw the plaster cast of this sculpture, he said "it ought to be cast in bronze." Someone paid for the bronze casting and sent it to the White House, the White House sent it to the National Gallery of Art, and after a stint in the art galleries of the 1939 New York World's Fair, it arrived to the Interior Building. The statue is located at the east end of the cafeteria courtyard and stands atop a serpentine marble base. The plaster cast went to Howard University Library. The bronze version of the sculpture is featured in the PWAP official report of 1934.

The sculpture is recognized as a "powerful comment on the plight of African-Americans" before and during the Great Depression. According to Artists on the left: American artists and the Communist movement, 1926-1956:

...not only did Glickman handle the figures in a way that connotes dignity within poverty, the intimation of common humanity that classicism brings with it makes the sculpture speak powerful against the injustice of a situation in which some went without shoes because of color and class.

— Andrew Hemingway, 2002

In 2011 the Washington Post mentioned Negro Mother and Child amongst a handful of other public artworks in the national capital city that "flesh out the story of the nation" with representations of the African-American experience.
