= Artis Lane =

Canadian sculptor and painter

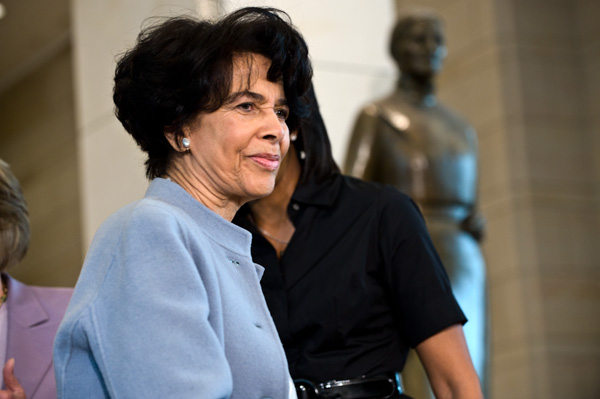
- Lane at the unveiling of her bust of Sojourner Truth at the U.S. Capitol
- Born: Artis Shreve; 1927 (age 98–99); North Buxton, Ontario, Canada
- Education: Ontario College of Art, Cranbrook Academy of Art
- Known for: Portrait artist, sculptor, painter
- Notable work: Portrait of Sojourner Truth, Emancipation Hall, Capitol Visitor Center
- Website: The Work of Artis Lane

Artis Lane (born Artis Shreve) is a Canadian sculptor and painter. Her bronze bust of Sojourner Truth is on display in Emancipation Hall at the Capitol Visitor Center in Washington, D.C. It was unveiled in 2009, and was the first statue in the Capitol to represent an African-American woman. Lane's sculpture of Rosa Parks was on display in the Oval Office during the presidency of Joe Biden.

== Personal life ==
Artis Lane was born in North Buxton, a small town near Chatham in Ontario, Canada, in a community largely populated by the descendants of slaves who emigrated to Canada on the Underground Railroad. At two years old her family moved to Ann Arbor, Michigan, where she started developing her interests in drawing and painting. Upon graduating high school, she received a scholarship to attend the Ontario College of Art in Toronto, Ontario. After receiving her degree, she moved to Detroit, Michigan, newly married to her husband, journalist Bill Lane. While there, she continued her education at the Cranbrook Academy of Art.

== Artistic career ==
The St. James Guide to Black Artists describes Artis Lane's sculpture as "primarily concerned with portraying what she sees as enduring spiritual truths. These truths are that the growth of spiritual awareness is continuous and that nobody ever arrives at perfection. In addition, spiritual awareness connects humans with a universal force."

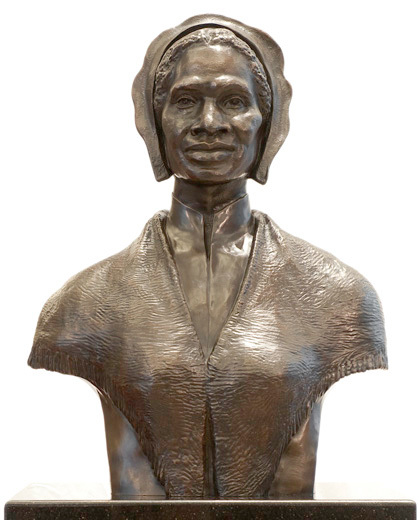
Bust of Sojourner Truth (2009)

Lane works in a variety of mediums, including sketching, oil painting, bronze sculpture, and collage. Her works include a bronze portrait of Rosa Parks for the Smithsonian Institution, which has been on display at the National Portrait Gallery, but also on display in the Oval Office of President Biden. In 1999, she designed Rosa Parks' Congressional Medal of Honor. In 2021, Collected Detroit gallery hosted "Steps Towards Justice" featuring portaints of Rosa Parks by Lane.

She also produced a series of bronze portraits for the Soul Train Awards, and designed the original logo for the Dance Theatre of Harlem. She has made portraits and sculptures of celebrities and prominent people such as Cary Grant, Armand Hammer, Nancy Kissinger, Coleman Young, Barbara Bush and former President George H. W. Bush, Bill Cosby, Walter Annenberg, Michael Jordan, Gordon Getty, Nelson Mandela and Henry Kissinger.

The National Congress of Black Women commissioned Lane to create a bronze bust portraying women's-right advocate and abolitionist Sojourner Truth. The bust was unveiled on April 28, 2009 by First Lady Michelle Obama for permanent display in the Emancipation Hall at the Capitol Visitor Centre, making Truth the first black woman to be honored with a bust at the U.S. Capitol.

== Awards and honors ==
In 2007, the California African American Museum presented Lane with a Lifetime Achievement Award, and featured a retrospective of her work.

Lane was honoured in 2013 as a recipient of the Women's Caucus for Art Lifetime Achievement Award.

Lane was inducted into the Chatham-Kent Cultural Hall of Fame in 2022 as part of its inaugural class.
