= Langston Terrace Dwellings =

- U.S. National Register of Historic Places
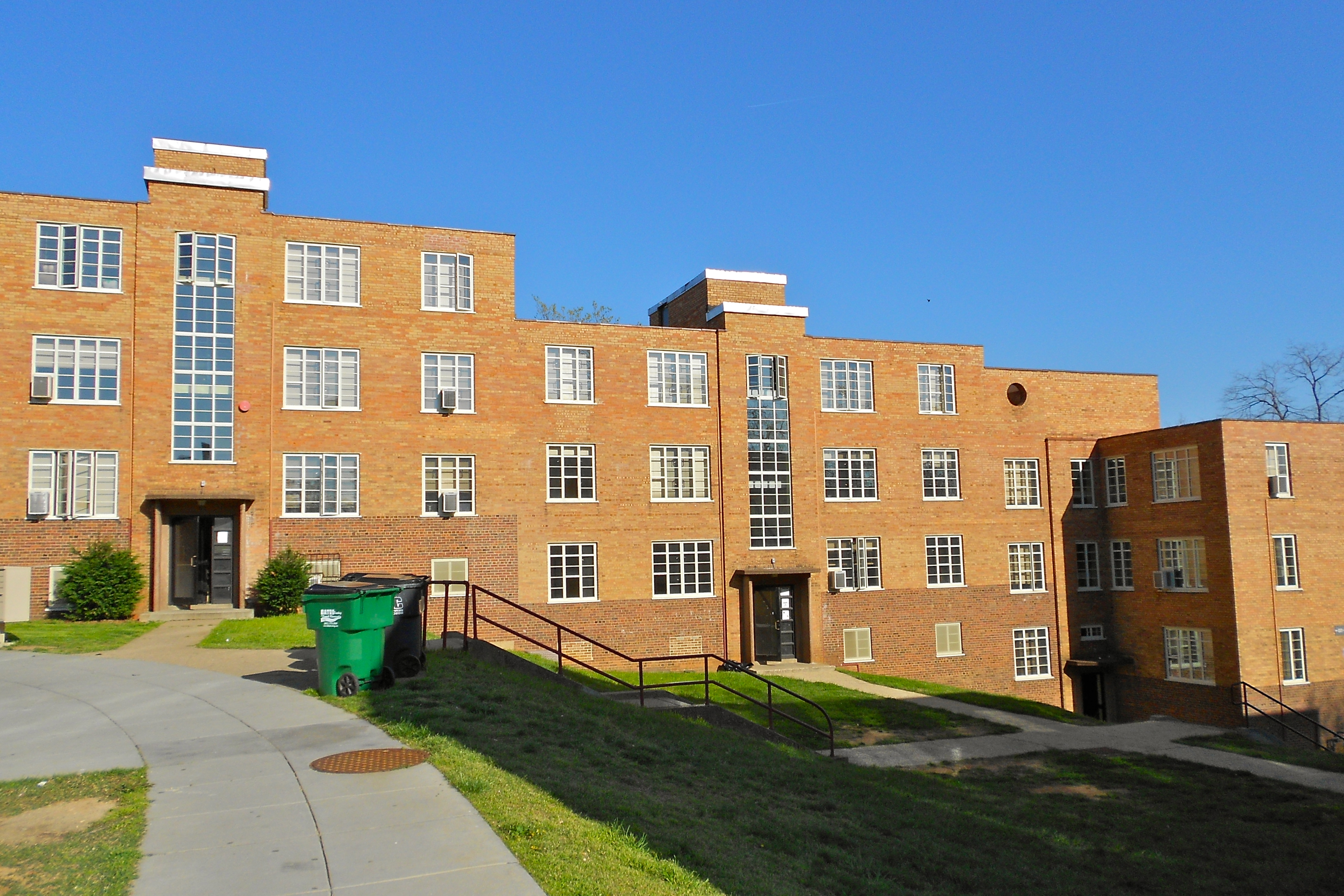
- Langston Terrace Dwellings in 2012

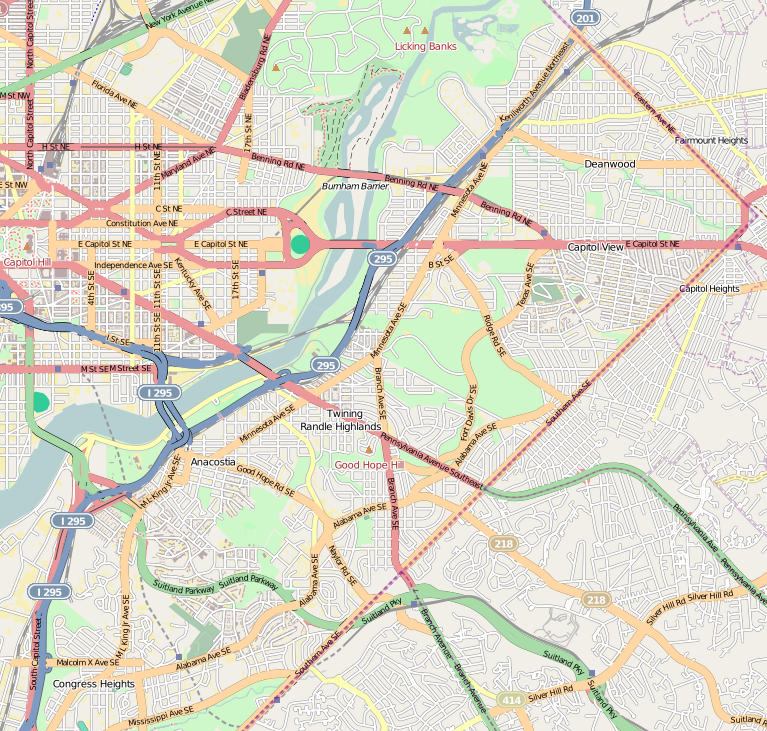
- Location within Washington, D.C. Location within the District of Columbia Location within the United States
- Location: 21st St NE, between Benning Rd NE and H St NE; Washington, D.C.
- Coordinates: 38°53′58″N 76°58′26″W
- Built: 1935–1938
- Architect: Hilyard Robinson
- Architectural style: International
- NRHP reference No.: 87001851
- Added to NRHP: November 12, 1987

Langston Terrace Dwellings are historic structures located in the Langston portion of the Carver/Langston neighborhoods in the Northeast quadrant of Washington, D.C. The apartments were built between 1935 and 1938, as one of the earliest housing projects to be federally funded. The Langston Terrace Dwellings were listed on the National Register of Historic Places in 1987.

== History ==
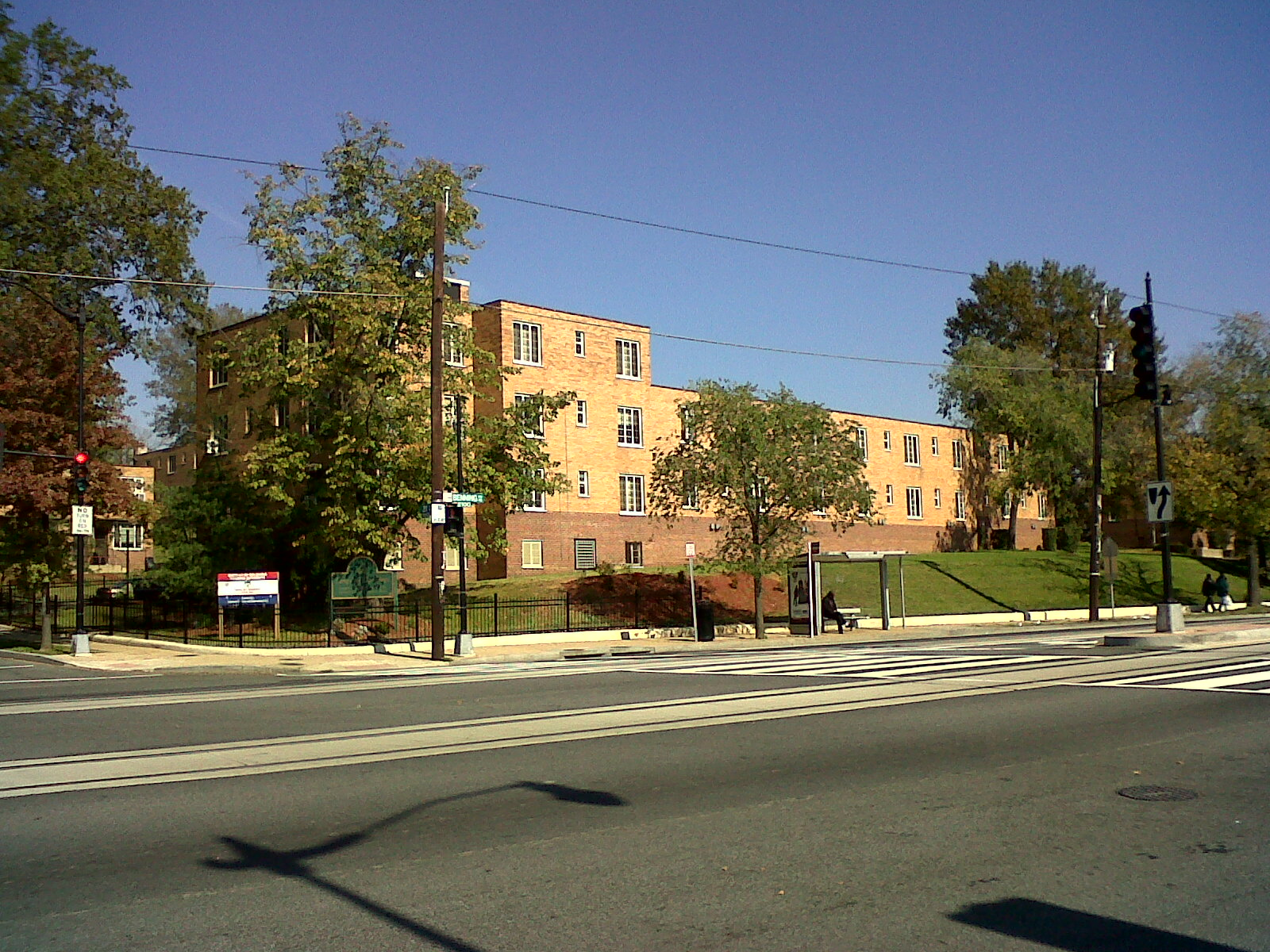
View from Benning Road

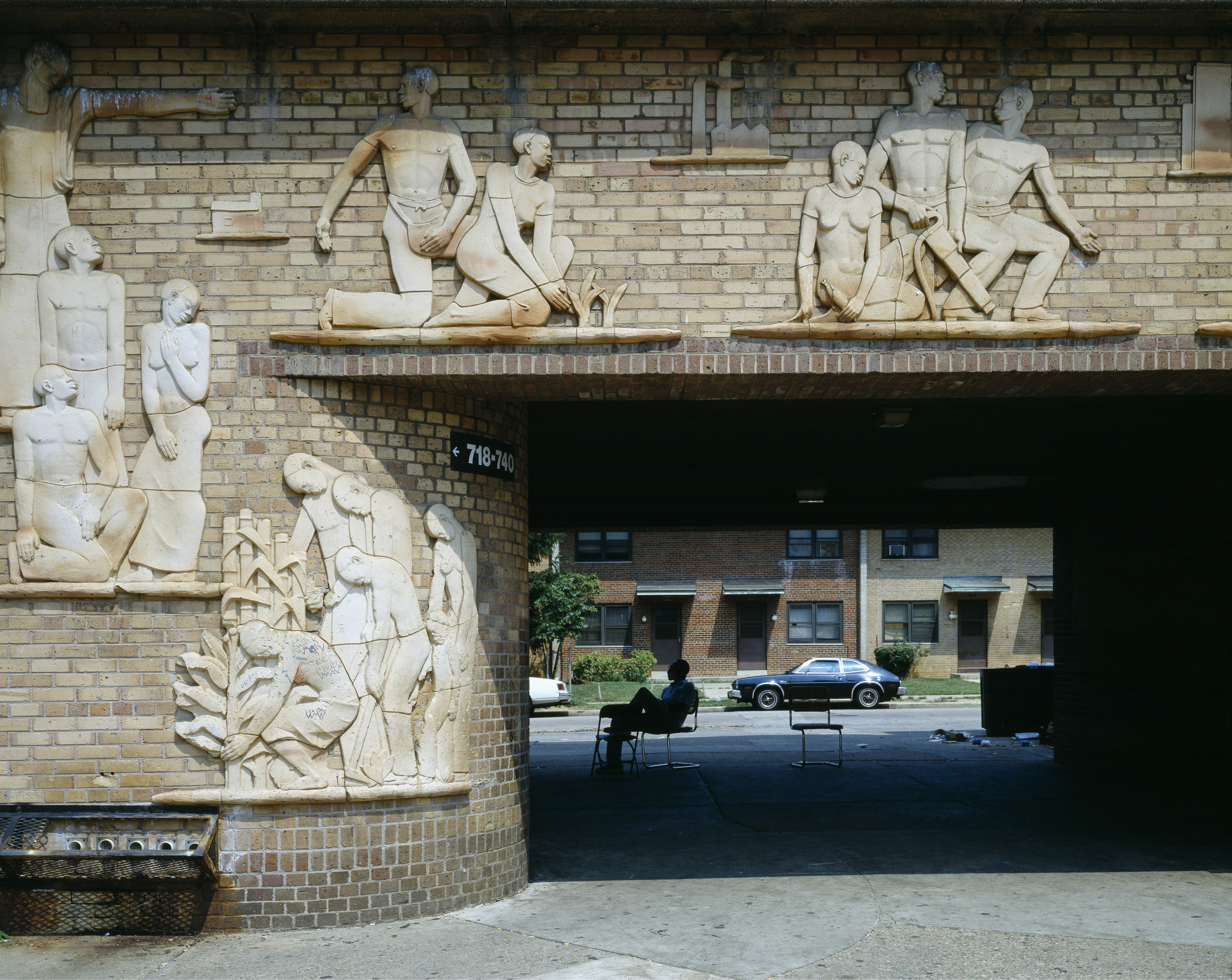
Daniel Gillette Olney frieze at Langston Terrace Dwellings

Langston Terrace was the first federally funded housing project in Washington, D.C., and one of the first four in the United States. It was developed as part of President Franklin Delano Roosevelt’s Public Works Administration. Unlike Techwood Homes, the first public housing project in the U.S., Langston was open to African American families. The project was named in honor of John Mercer Langston, a 19th-century American attorney and abolitionist who founded Howard University Law School. Langston served in the U.S. Congress, representing Virginia.

The complex was co-designed by Bauhaus-trained Washington architect Hilyard Robinson and Los Angeles-based architect Paul Revere Williams in the International Style. The site planning and landscape design were completed by landscape architect David Williston. The project cost the government $1.8 million and rooms were available for $6 per month or $4.50 per month without utilities.

Much like Aberdeen Gardens in Virginia, also designed by the famed African American architect Hilyard Robinson, the 274-unit complex was constructed primarily by African American laborers. The housing project contained a mixture of two-story townhouses and three-story walk-ups, built around garden style central common areas (mews). The site was organized to include 20% buildings and 80% common green space and walkways.

Daniel Gillette Olney's The Progress of the Negro Race is a terra-cotta frieze located in the central courtyard. The frieze depicts African American history from slavery to World War I migration. Olney's Madonna and Children is located in the same courtyard. Cubist concrete animal sculptures by sculptor Lenore Thomas Straus were added to the courtyard in 1941, and provide climbing structures for children.

Langston Terrace was listed on the National Register of Historic Places as of 1987.

== See also ==
- Housing in Washington, D.C.
