= Maurice Glickman =

American sculptor, art teacher (1906–1981)

- Guggenheim Foundation annual report, 1934
- Born: January 7, 1906; Iași, Romania
- Died: 1981; United States
- Notable work: Negro Mother and Child, Pearl Divers

Maurice Glickman (January 6, 1906 – May 1981) was an American sculptor noted for his New Deal-era sculpture for public buildings. He was named a Guggenheim Fellow in 1934. He founded the School of Art Studies in New York and was its director from 1945 to 1955. His work is in the Albany Institute of History and Art, and in the Hirshhorn Museum.

== Life and work ==
Glickman was born in Iași, in what was then the Romanian Old Kingdom. His family was Jewish. Glickman immigrated to the United States in 1920, with his parents Solomon and Sarah, three older sisters and an older brother. In 1925 they lived together in the Bronx. He began his art education in 1921, and was naturalized a citizen in 1929. He attended the Educational Alliance Art School and the Arts Students League of New York. On December 17, 1931, Maurice Glickman married Florence Levinson. In 1934 he won a Guggenheim Fellowship: "Appointed for creative work in sculpture and studies in classical Greek sculpture, abroad; tenure, twelve months from May 18, 1934." In 1936, Glickman created one of 203 artworks that appeared in a touring exhibition of the U.S. that was ultimately meant to be donated to a new art museum in Birobidzhan, USSR. (The artworks never made it to Birobidzhan and the whereabouts of the collection is unknown.) Glickman was also involved in the New York City Artists Union, the Marxist front American Artists' Congress, and in 1937 and 1938, "three of his sculptures had been illustrated" in the American Marxist magazine New Masses. Per the records of HUAC, in 1939 he signed a petition for the Communist Party of the United States.

His commissions for the Public Works of Art Project and Treasury Section of Fine Arts included:

- Negro Mother and Child, U.S. Department of the Interior building in Washington, D.C. (1934) This sculpture is said to exemplify "the modernised classicism characteristic of Glickman's art. It was the use of this style in an image of African Americans that made the sculpture stand for progressive values in the context."
- Cast-stone "Physical Changes of the Postman through the Ages," Northampton, Pennsylvania post office (1939); the figures represent an Egyptian messenger, Roman messenger, colonial postman, Pony Express rider, mailman of 1861, postman of 1900, and air mail pilot.
- Bas relief mahogany carving "Construction," South River, New Jersey post office (1943); this design is reproduced on the cover of a 1989 record album by Big Shoulders
- There are some mentions of a relief called "Agriculture" or "Southern Farm Life" having been installed at the Ashburn, Georgia post office in 1947 but "unfortunately, it was either never installed or has been lost over the years." (In the 1930s, between US$55,000 and $75,000 was allocated for a new post office in Ashburn.)

At the time of the installation of "Construction," Glickman was said to be the author of "many articles on art and architecture." He had also taught at the Educational Alliance Art School, Unter College, Theodore Roosevelt High School, and Woman's College of the University of North Carolina. In 1940 his sculpture Football Players, commissioned by the NY WPA, was exhibited at the Philadelphia Museum of Art.

American Artist published a photo feature about his sculptures in 1943. Glickman's abstracted aluminum sculpture Pearl Divers was photographed and featured in the New York Times coverage of a Whitney exhibit in 1946. Circa March 1937, the School of Art Studies was located at 2231 Broadway and was opening an annex at 90th and Broadway. The school offered classes in painting, sculpture, graphic arts, and illustration. The GI Bill allowed many former U.S. soldiers and sailors, such as comic artist John Powers Severin, to afford tuition at the school. Leonard Baskin was Glickman's apprentice for two years. At time of the 1950 U.S. federal census, Maurice's occupation was director of an art school and his wife was secretary of an art school.

In 1955, Glickman's sculpture Grief was exhibited at 17th Annual Exhibition of the Sculptors Guild. The Albany Institute of Art and History organized a retrospective exhibition of his work in 1963. Glickman also had pieces installed in public buildings in Israel. At one time Glickman's art was sold through the Florence Lewison Gallery of New York City. Maurice Glickman died in May 1981.
