= Warren City School District =

School district in Ohio, United States

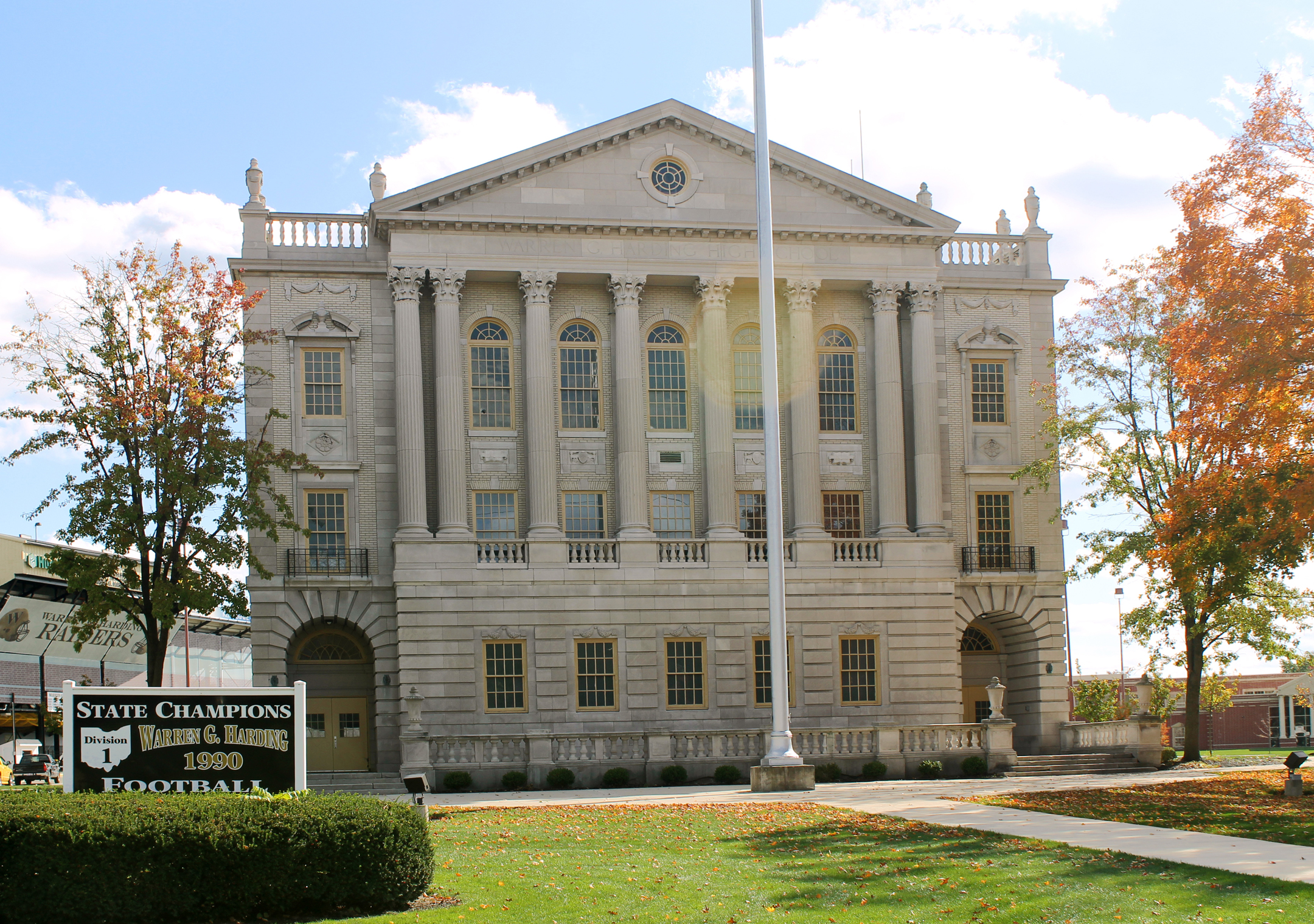
- The former Warren G. Harding High School facade, located in front of the current campus

Address
- 105 High Street Warren, Ohio, 44481; United States

District information
- Type: Public
- Grades: PK–12
- Superintendent: Steve Chairo
- NCES District ID: 3904499

Students and staff
- Enrollment: 4,717 (2025–2026)
- Teachers: 278.73 (on an FTE basis) (2025–2026)
- Staff: 796.72 (on an FTE basis) (2025–2026)
- Student–teacher ratio: 16.92 (2025–2026)

Other information
- Website: www.warrencityschools.org

The Warren City School District is a school district located in Trumbull County, Ohio. The school district serves students Pre-K through twelve living in Warren, Ohio The school district serves one high school, and four middle and elementary schools. All schools and offices are located in Warren, Ohio.

== History ==
In 1926, Warren G. Harding High School was opened, marking the city's first high school. The original mascot for the high school was the Panthers, the district wide mascot later became the Raiders, following the consolidation of Western Reserve and Warren G. Harding in 1990.

In 1966, due to rising population, Warren built Western Reserve High School on the city's south side. the high school was closed in 1990 due to declining population in the 1980s, along with facing budget constraints, and consolidated with Warren G. Harding. It was used as a middle school until it was demolished in 2011.

During the early 21st century, the Warren City School District underwent a redistricting process due to declining population, which saw the construction of the new Warren G. Harding High School, and the demolition of several early 20th century elementary and junior high schools. In the fall of 2009 the school district reconstructed 3 former elementary buildings and one new building, Jefferson, McGuffey, Lincoln and Willard, all of which became the only four PK-8 buildings in the Warren City School District. a facade of the old Harding High School was kept from demolition and stands in front of the high school campus today.

In 2024, Warren City Schools built and opened a new Student Recreation and Wellness center located at Warren G. Harding High School, which features fitness amenities such as an indoor track, locker rooms, an artificial turf field, weight room, etc., as well as study and lounge rooms along with space for robotics and E-Sports programs. It also has a health clinic which is operated by Akron Children's Pediatrics.

== Schools ==
Schools within the district consist of

=== High schools ===
- Warren G. Harding High School

=== PK-8 schools ===
- Jefferson PK-8
- McGuffey PK-8
- Lincoln PK-8
- Willard PK-8

=== Former schools ===
- Central High School
- Devon School
- Dickey School
- East Market Street School
- Elm Road School
- Harry B. Turner Junior High School
- Henry H. Alden School
- Horace Mann School
- Jefferson School
- Laird Ave School
- Lincoln School
- McGuffey School
- McKinley School
- Roosevelt School
- Washington School
- West Junior High School
- Western Reserve High School

== District enrollment figures (K-12) ==
Enrollment data listed overtime:

1980	1985	1990	1995	2000	2005	2010	2015	2020	2025
9,215	8,664	7,857	7,189	7,230	6,553	5,597	5,018	4,846	4,717

== Notable alumni ==
Warren High Schools' Distinguished Alumni Hall of Fame was launched in 1993. notable distinguished alumni include:

- Roger Ailes – former president and CEO of Fox News Network
- David Arnold – former professional football player in the National Football League (NFL)
- Lynn Bowden – former professional football player in the National Football League (NFL)
- Aaron Brown – former professional football player in the National Football League (NFL)
- Keith Browner – former professional football player in the National Football League (NFL)
- Jim Browner – former professional football player in the National Football League (NFL)
- Ross Browner – former professional football player in the National Football League (NFL)
- Prescott Burgess – former professional football player in the National Football League (NFL)
- Michael Capellas – current CEO of WorldCom
- Joe Carroll – former professional football player in the National Football League (NFL)
- John Chickerneo – former professional football player in the National Football League (NFL)
- Maurice Clarett – former college football player
- Chaz Coleman - college football defensive end
- James Daniels – professional football player in the National Football League (NFL)
- LeShun Daniels – former professional football player in the National Football League (NFL)
- Shaheed Davis - professional basketball player
- David L. Gray - catholic theologian, author, speaker, and radio show host
- Daniel Herron – former professional football player in the National Football League (NFL)
- David Herron – former professional football player in the National Football League (NFL)
- Sean Jones – musician, lead trumpeter for Jazz at Lincoln Center Orchestra, composer
- Bill Kollar – former professional football player in the National Football League (NFL)
- Kay'Ron Lynch-Adams –professional football player
- Mario Manningham – former professional football player in the National Football League (NFL)
- John Ness Beck – composer of religious music
- Ronald Parise – former astronaut
- Kenneth Patchen – former poet
- Chris Rucker –former professional football player in the National Football League (NFL)
- Korey Stringer – former professional football player in the National Football League (NFL)
- Ed Stroud – Major League Baseball player (1966–1971)
- Paul Warfield – former professional football player in the National Football League (NFL)
- Bill White – former professional baseball player in the Major League Baseball (MLB), broadcaster and National League president
