= Packard Proving Grounds =

Coordinates: 42.66148°N 83.03844°W

- U.S. National Register of Historic Places
- U.S. Historic district
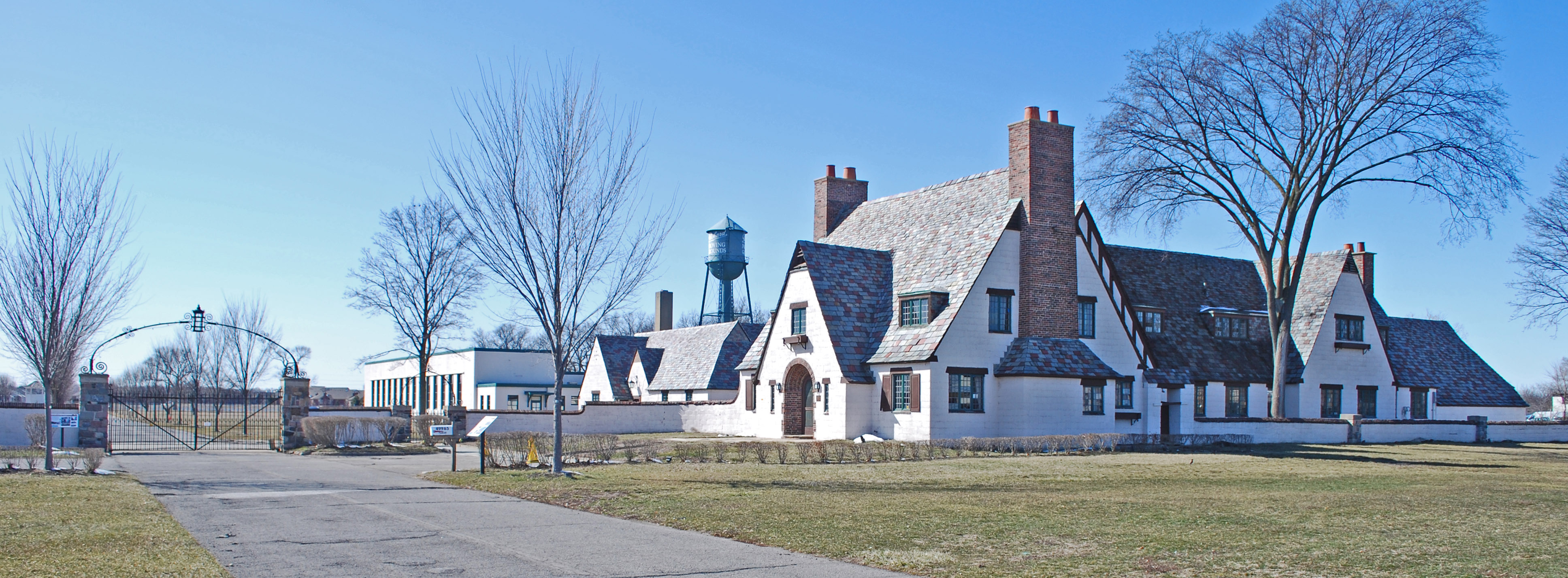

- Location within Michigan Location within the United States
- Interactive map
- Location: 49965 Van Dyke Ave., Shelby Charter Township, Michigan
- Area: 14.5 acres (5.9 ha)
- Built: 1926
- Architect: Albert Kahn & William E. Kapp; Packard Motor Car Co.
- Architectural style: Cotswold style, of architecture
- NRHP reference No.: 06001322
- Added to NRHP: February 1, 2007

The Packard Proving Grounds (the remains of which are now called the Packard Proving Grounds Gateway Complex), was a proving ground established in Shelby Charter Township, Michigan in 1927 by the Packard Motor Car Company of Detroit. It is listed in the National Register of Historic Places.

== History ==
Packard had been founded in Warren, Ohio in 1899 by brothers James Ward Packard and William Doud Packard. The company attracted several investors from Detroit, and by 1903 the Michigan investors had convinced the Packard brothers to let them relocate the young business to the emerging motor capital of Detroit.

The Packard automobile quickly evolved into a superbly engineered prestige vehicle. To maintain and advance their product position, Packard's general manager, Henry Bourne Joy, sought to establish a dedicated testing facility. Testing on local streets and roads was risky due to traffic, and could potentially expose Packard's future product developments to curious competitors.

An early attempt to locate a testing facility north and east of Detroit near the city of Mount Clemens was not approved by the Packard board of directors. A site had already been acquired by Henry Joy, but the 640 acres (2.6 km^{2}) was deemed to not have enough topographic diversity to allow for such things as hill testing. At the dawn of America's entry into World War I, Joy leased and eventually sold the site to the U.S. Government for use as a training airfield. The main access road to what was to become Selfridge Field was named Henry B. Joy Boulevard in honor of Joy.

Almost eight years passed before a proving ground was again pursued. This time, a 560-acre (2.3 km^{2}) site in Charter Township of Shelby, Michigan about 20 miles (32 km) due north of the Packard factory, was procured. Noted Detroit architect Albert Kahn was retained to design the buildings of the facility, which was opened in 1928.

The Packard Proving Grounds consisted of a 2.5-mile (4.0 km) high-speed concrete oval track with timing tower, miles of test roads of various conditions, an airplane hangar (Packard was also involved in developing aircraft engines, and used the track's infield as a landing strip), a repair garage, and a gate house/lodge that housed the Proving Grounds manager and his family. The Tudor Revival lodge building also had garage space for eight cars, plus dormitory rooms for visiting engineers.

The garage building contained experimental and engineering laboratories allowing the testing of engines, chassis, electrical components, fuels, and lubricants under a variety of conditions.

During World War II, the Chrysler Corporation leased the entire Proving Grounds to test tanks and other armored vehicles, and constructed a new building on the site that was capable of servicing tanks.

Packard operated the Proving Grounds until August 15, 1956, when the dire financial condition of the Studebaker-Packard Corporation forced it to consolidate all operations at Studebaker's South Bend, Indiana facilities. That same summer, Studebaker-Packard entered into a management agreement with the Curtiss-Wright Corporation in a last-ditch attempt to avoid bankruptcy. Studebaker-Packard would receive enough funding to continue with a 1957 product program, and in exchange Curtiss-Wright would receive a tax write-off as well as all of Studebaker-Packard's defense contract business. Curtiss-Wright retained possession of the Packard Proving Grounds after the management agreement with Studebaker–Packard ended in 1959, as Curtiss-Wright was using Packard's former engine and transmission plant (located on the northwest corner of the Proving Grounds property) to manufacture jet aircraft engines.

Curtiss-Wright sold the property to the Ford Motor Company in 1961. Ford used the former engine plant to manufacture automotive interior trim, and at various times used the lodge and engineering buildings to make small service runs of prior model year trim parts. Ford also used the test track for early emission control testing, saving its main test track in nearby Romeo, Michigan for higher-priority testing.

By 1998, most of the Ford Motor Company's surplus land holdings were turned over to an internal unit called Ford Motor Land Development Corporation. With the growth through the years of the surrounding Shelby Township and Utica communities, Ford Land decided to make the excess property at the former Packard Proving Grounds available for development. The first proposal they entertained was for a United States Postal Service distribution center to be located along 23 Mile Road at the north end of the Proving Grounds site. Eventually, the intention was to level the original Packard buildings so that the entire site could be marketed.

Although Ford Motor had been a good employer and a good corporate citizen of the area, Ford Land's initiatives were met with some resistance on several fronts. Some residents objected to the noise, traffic, and light pollution that they felt a USPS distribution center would bring. Others decried the loss of a great amount of wildlife habitat. Historians and old car enthusiasts opposed the loss of a significant automotive landmark. Ford Land applied for demolition permits, but the permits were denied by Shelby Township. Meanwhile, several old car enthusiasts and members of the Shelby Township Historical Commission banded together to submit proposals to have the Packard Proving Grounds site named as a State of Michigan Historic Site, and to have it added to the National Register of Historic Places.

As opposition to the development began to grow, the USPS decided not to risk a protracted legal engagement and instead opted to locate their facility on a portion of the former Pontiac Motor Division site in Pontiac, Michigan.

A non-profit group called the Packard Motor Car Foundation was officially formed to approach Ford Land in an attempt to preserve the most historic and significant portions of the Proving Grounds. After several rounds of meetings, Ford Land generously offered to gift 7 acres (28,000 m^{2}) of land to the Foundation, which contained the lodge building, the garage, the water tower, and the Chrysler Defense building. The Foundation would then be responsible for the restoration and perpetual care of the site. An additional 7 acres (28,000 m^{2}), containing the timing tower and a 458-foot (140 m) section of the original test track, would be given to the Foundation once certain restoration and fundraising goals were met. The Foundation moved the aircraft hangar to the reserve property in 2003.

The Packard Proving Grounds was added to the National Register of Historic Places in 2000. The site is a part of the MotorCities National Heritage Area established in southeast Michigan by the National Park Service. All restoration work at the Packard Proving Grounds Historic Site is being done to National Park Service standards for historic preservation. Proposals for the future sustaining use of the site include an "Arsenal of Democracy" museum, which would illustrate the many contributions made to World War II by the automotive industry. The site could also be used as a facility for catered events such as business meetings, weddings, and car-related shows and meets.

== Description ==
The remaining gateway structures occupy a 14.51-acre (58,700 m^{2}) rectangular section of land east of the test track's original center. A pair of concrete driveways access the section, and lead through pair of monumental, twenty-two-foot wide gates of decorative wrought iron arches supported by fieldstone pillars. Nearby is the 1927 Gate Lodge, an asymmetrical, two-story structure made of stucco-covered, steel reinforced concrete block. The lodge has a steeply pitched slate roof with multiple intersecting gables and flat-roofed dormers. At the south end is a side-gabled, three-bedroom residence. Both the lodge and the gates were designed by Albert Kahn.

About 100 feet (30 m) west of the Gate Lodge sits the single story, Tudor Revival style Repair Garage. Designed in 1928 by Albert Kahn, it uses the same wall and roof materials and the same asymmetrical, cross-gabled form as the Gate Lodge. The nearby Engineering Laboratory was designed by William E. Kapp in 1943. It is a 1 1/2-story rectangular building, constructed of concrete block with a flat asphalt composite roof. Three smaller outbuildings and a water tower are located north of the engineering building and repair garage. These are the 1927 tool shed, the 1929 garage and restroom, and the c. 1955 electrical building.

West of these buildings, where the driveways meet the test track, is the 1927 Timing House, an octagonal, two-story wood-frame structure with an open upper deck. The remnants of the original test track oval are nearby, and just east is the 1927 single story airplane hangar.

== Gallery ==
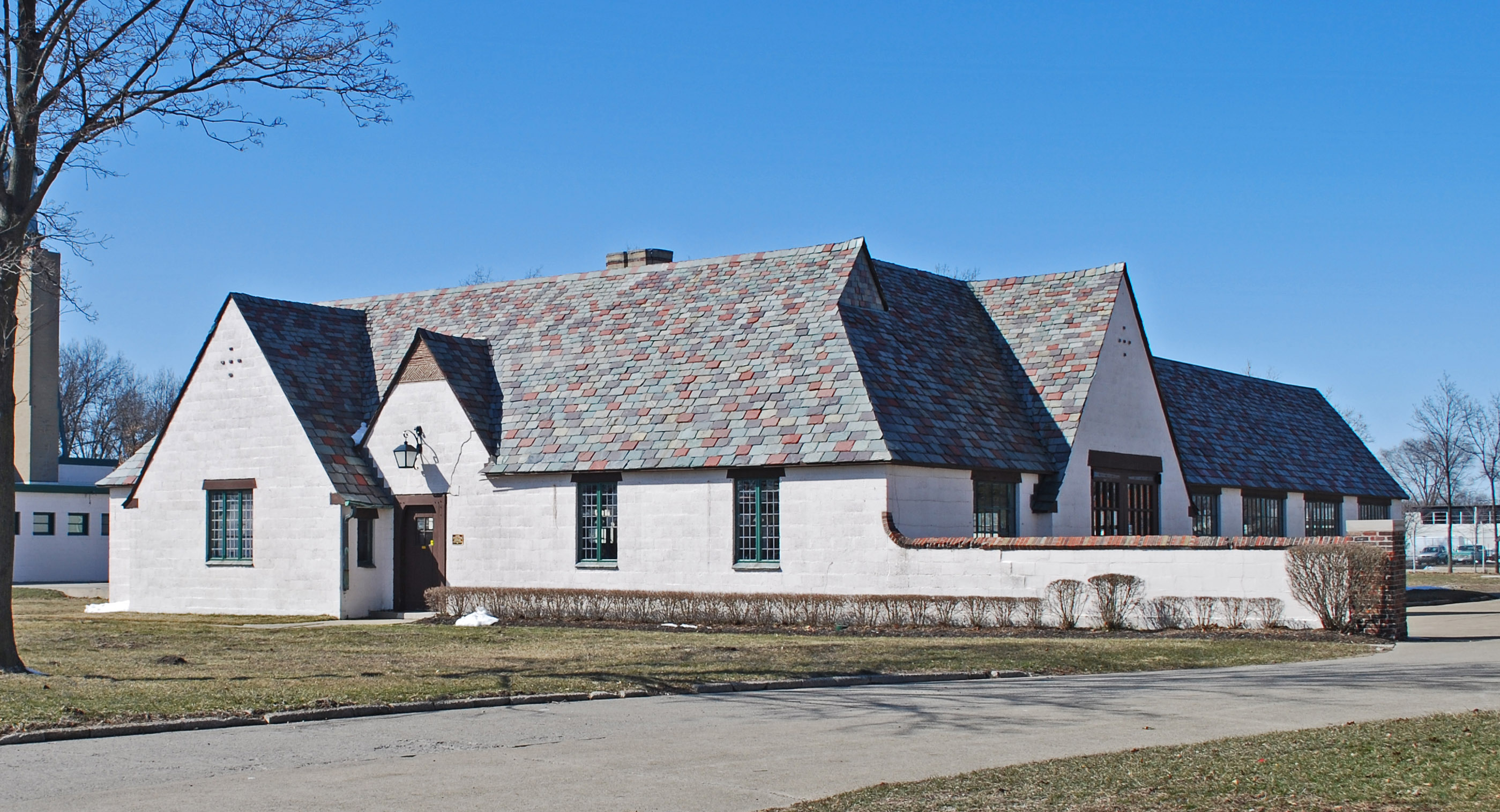

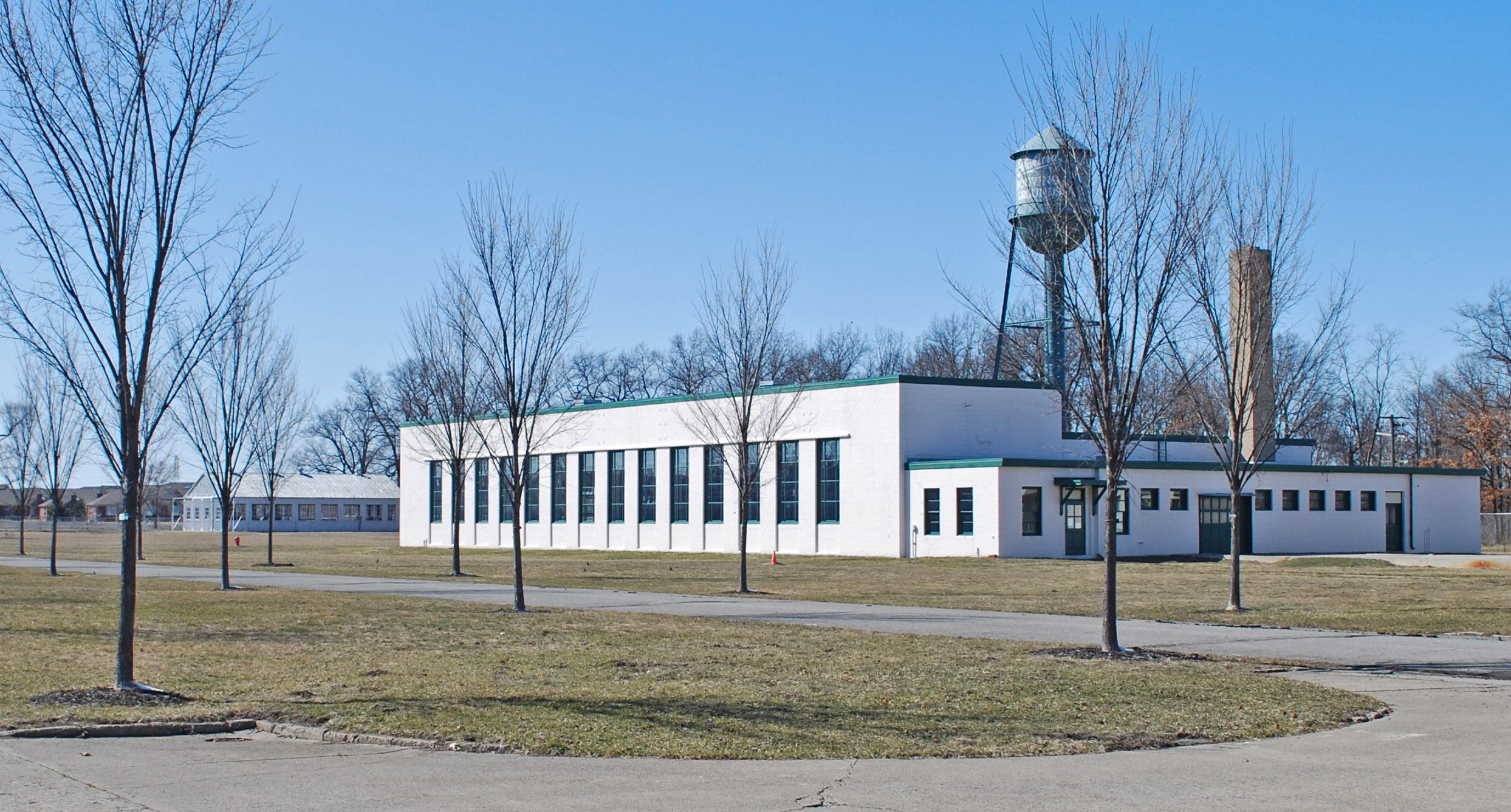
