= Henry Bourne Joy =

American businessman (1864–1936)

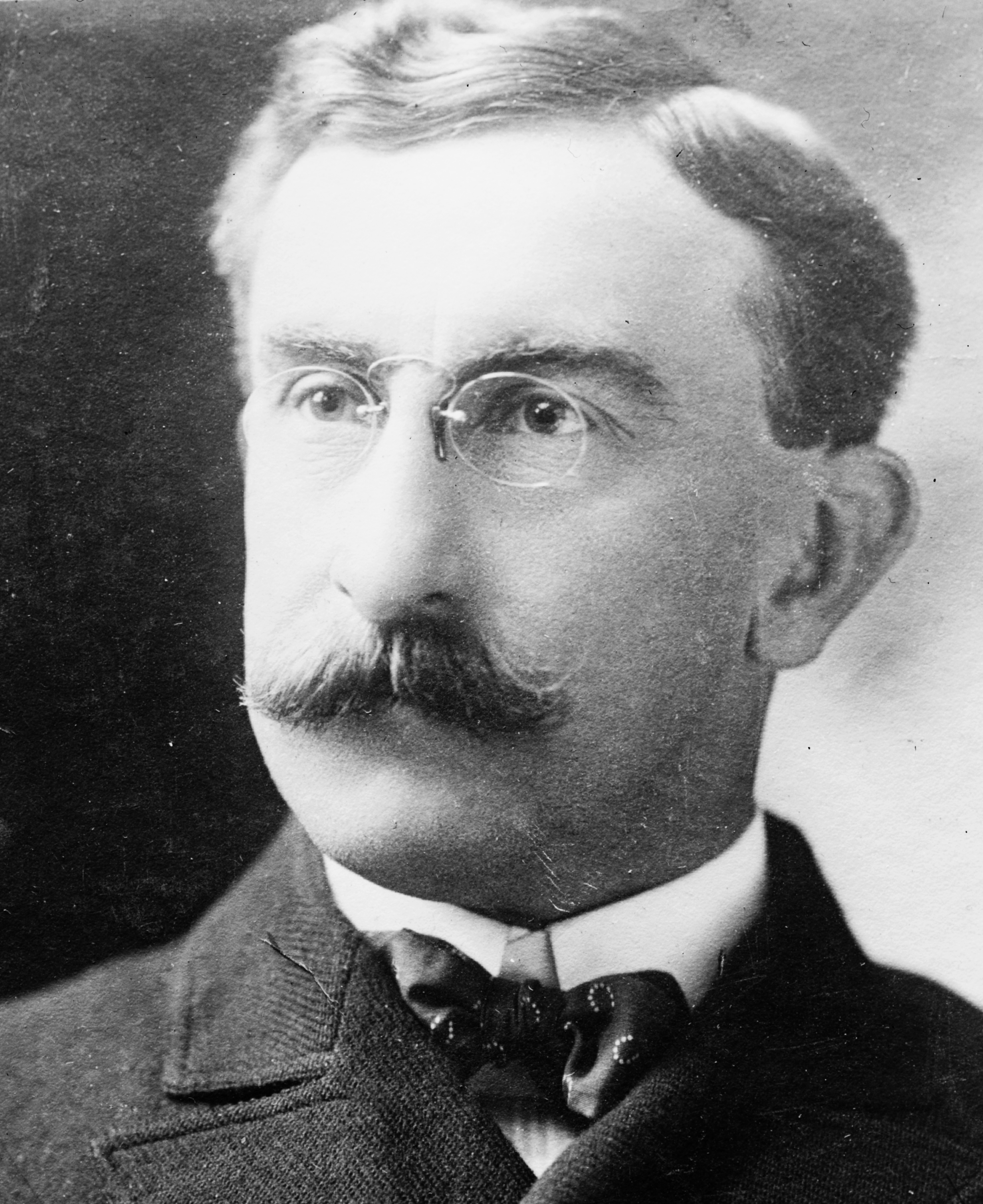
- Joy, c. 1910–1915

Personal details
- Born: November 23, 1864 Detroit, Michigan, U.S.
- Died: November 6, 1936 (aged 71) Detroit, Michigan, U.S.
- Spouse: Helen Hall Newberry (m. 1892)
- Parent: James F. Joy (father)
- Education: Yale University
- Profession: president, Packard Motor Car Co.

Henry Bourne Joy (November 23, 1864 – November 6, 1936) was an American businessman and President of the Packard Motor Car Company. He was a major developer of automotive activities as well as being a social activist.

In 1913, Joy and Carl G. Fisher were driving forces as principal organizers of the Lincoln Highway Association, a group dedicated to building a concrete road from New York to San Francisco. After the first several years, Fisher had become more involved with the Dixie Highway, but Joy remained dedicated to the Lincoln Highway. Naming it after former U.S. President Abraham Lincoln was one of the moves Joy led, and his Lincoln Highway project was completed in his lifetime, despite a lack of financial support by automotive leaders such as Henry Ford.

Joy was also a prominent figure on both sides of prohibition during that turbulent era.

== Early life ==
Joy was born in Detroit in 1864, the son of Michigan Central Railroad president James F. Joy. His father was involved with the great railroad push to Missouri, and hired Abraham Lincoln to assist him with mergers.

Joy began his schooling in Michigan, then graduated from Phillips Academy, Andover in 1883. He then attended Yale University, graduating in 1892. While there, he was a member of St. Anthony Hall.

== Career ==
Joy began his career as an office boy with Peninsular Car Company (a Detroit company controlled by his father), working his way up to becoming assistant treasurer. He left to try his hand at mining in Utah, but returned to Detroit to become treasurer (and later director) of the Fort Street Union Depot Company. Joy also held various positions at the Detroit Union Railroad Station and Depot Company (treasurer, vice president, president, and director), becoming president after his father's death in 1896. He was later treasurer and director of the Peninsular Sugar Refining Company.

During the Spanish–American War, Joy served aboard the auxiliary cruiser USS Yosemite (along with his brother-in-law and lifelong friend, Truman Handy Newberry) as chief boatswain's mate. Later, during World War I, Joy served in the US Army Signal Corps, entering as a captain and leaving as a lieutenant colonel.

== Packard ==
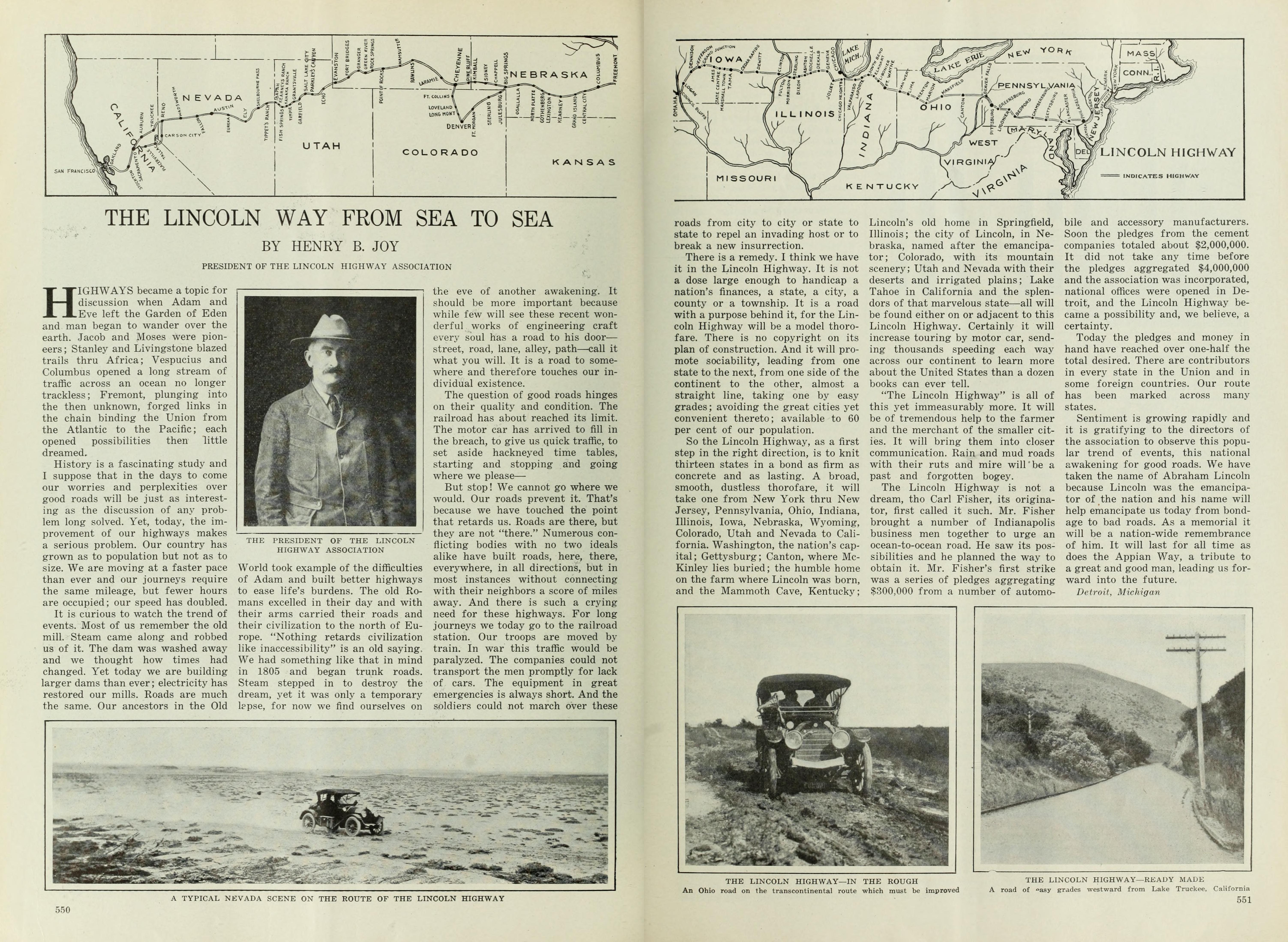
An article on the Lincoln Highway by Joy in The Independent, December 18, 1913

In 1902, on a trip to New York City, Joy happened to see two Packards chase down a horse-drawn fire wagon. Intrigued, Joy bought the only Packard available in the city. Joy loved the car, and, impressed by its reliability, he visited James Ward Packard at his Warren, Ohio headquarters. Packard told him he and his brother William Dowd Packard needed more capital. Joy enlisted a group of investors that included his brother-in-law, Truman Handy Newberry. On October 2, 1902, the Ohio Automobile Company became Packard Motor Car Company, with Joy's investors obtaining majority ownership.

The company moved to Detroit, where Joy engaged Albert Kahn, then a young architect with novel ideas, to design and build the world's first reinforced concrete factory on East Grand Boulevard. The company prospered under Joy's leadership; he became the president in 1909 and chairman of the board in 1916.

During this time, Packard gained a reputation for technology and luxury. Joy steered Packard into innovative motor truck developments, and the creation of a V-12 engine. Joy began investigating airplane engines with Packard engineers, a research program that culminated in the renowned Liberty Motor.

Joy's interest in aviation led the company to continue developing aircraft for use in World War I combat in Europe. Packard acquired a large tract of land on Lake St. Clair, near Mt. Clemens, Michigan at the behest of Joy, who wanted a place to test the airplanes with the Liberty engines. The air field was at first named Joy Aviation Field and assisted the government with manufacturing and testing aircraft. After World War I the government acquired the field, renaming it Selfridge Air Base, for Thomas Selfridge, the first person killed in an airplane. The street leading to Selfridge is still called Joy Road.

Henry Joy served at Packard until 1926 (with a temporary interruption to serve in WWI).

== Later life ==
His belief that the national prohibition of alcohol would lead to a safer, healthier and better society led him to be very active in the Anti-Saloon League. However, after the social experiment was implemented he saw first-hand some of its negative consequences. For example, Treasury agents twice came onto his land and destroyed the property of his elderly watchman looking for illegal alcohol. Then a fisherman boating near Joy's house was fatally shot by an agent because he couldn't hear over the noise of his motor the demand of the agent that he stop and be searched for contraband beverage. Joy's testimony to the United States Congress contributed to the success of the movement for the repeal of prohibition in 1933.

In 1913, Joy became one of the principal organizers and president of the Lincoln Highway Association, a group dedicated to building a concrete road from New York to San Francisco. The effort, which was heavily promoted by his vice president, Carl Graham Fisher, succeeded, and a monument to Joy along the Lincoln Highway at the Continental Divide was dedicated on July 2, 1939. In 2001, this monument was moved to a more accessible location west of Cheyenne, Wyoming.

Joy founded the Henry B. Joy Historical Research Group in 1928 which operated until his death. The group was directed by historian Stephen I. Gilchrist. The group's initial focus was to publish a history of midwestern railroads. This charge was later expanded to include a biography of Abraham Lincoln highlighting the connection between Lincoln and Joy's father, James F. Joy. Neither work was ever published, but the groups research files and unpublished portions of the manuscripts are held in the University of Michigan's Bentley Historical Library.

== Family life ==
In 1892, Joy married Helen Hall Newberry.
