= John Chickerneo =

American football player (1917–1995)

No. 39
- Positions: Back, linebacker

Personal information
- Born: March 13, 1917; Gary, Indiana, U.S.
- Died: October 3, 1995 (aged 78); Deerfield, Illinois, U.S.
- Listed height: 6 ft 1 in (1.85 m)
- Listed weight: 205 lb (93 kg)

Career information
- High school: Warren (OH) Harding
- College: Pittsburgh
- NFL draft: 1939: 3rd round, 25th overall pick

Career history
- New York Giants (1942)

Awards and highlights
- National champion (1936, 1937); Eastern Championship/Lambert-Meadowlands Trophy (1936, 1937); Rose Bowl (1937)

Career NFL statistics
- Punts: 8
- Punt yards: 302
- Longest punt: 45
- Stats at Pro Football Reference

John "Chick" Louis Chickerneo (March 13, 1917 – October 3, 1995) was an American professional football player who won a national championship with the Pittsburgh Panthers in 1937 and then played one season with the New York Giants of the National Football League (NFL).

== Early life ==
Chickerneo attended Warren G. Harding High School in Warren, Ohio where he played football, baseball, basketball and ran track.

== College career ==
Chickerneo then played college football at the University of Pittsburgh from 1936 to 1938. He helped the team to win the Eastern Championship in 1936 and then the 1937 Rose Bowl. Some retroactive systems have named that team a National Champion. He helped the team to another Eastern Championship in 1937 and to its first AP National Championship as well, starting in several games that year. After the 1939 season he played in the East–West and North–South College All-Star Games.

== Professional career ==
Chickerneo was drafted by the New York Giants in the third round of the 1939 NFL draft and played for them in 4 games 1942.

== Personal life ==
Chickerneo graduated with a degree in engineering and later joined the military, where he fought in World War II and the Korean War, rising to the rank of 2nd Lieutenant.

In 1949, he moved on to coaching. He was an assistant coach at Pittsburgh from 1949 to 1952. He then became the Head Coach at Sharon High School in Sharon, PA from 1952 to 1959 where he led the team to 3 Conference Championships and 1 undefeated season. He moved to Highland Park High School where he was a math teacher and Head Football Coach from 1959 to 1984 and where he led the team to the 1964 Suburban League Football Championship.
