= Alaska P. Davidson =

First female FBI agent (1868-1934)

Alaska Packard Davidson
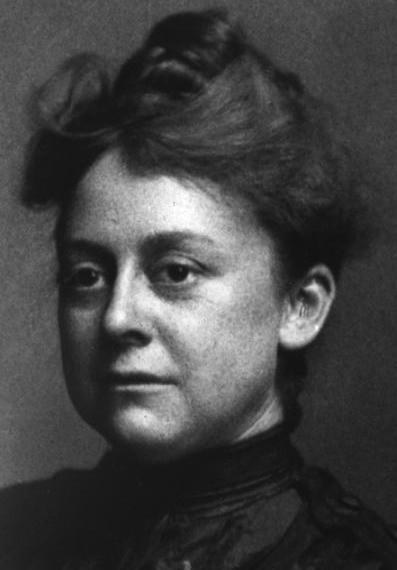
- Born: Alaska Packard; March 1, 1868; Warren, Ohio
- Died: July 16, 1934 (aged 66); Alexandria, Virginia
- Occupation: FBI special agent
- Spouses: Ephraim B. McCrum (m. 1893); James B. Davidson (1905-1929)
- Relatives: James Ward Packard (brother); William Doud Packard (brother)

Alaska Packard Davidson (March 1, 1868 – July 16, 1934) was an American law enforcement officer who is best known for being the first female special agent in the FBI.

== Early life ==
Davidson was born in Warren, Ohio, on March 1, 1868, to Warren and Mary Elizabeth Doud Packard. Her two brothers, James Ward Packard and William Doud Packard, founded Packard, an automobile manufacturer later taken over by Studebaker. She grew up in one of the largest houses in Warren and was likely named after the U.S. Department of Alaska, which had recently been purchased.

Little is known about her personal life, except that she only had three years of public schooling and no university education. She was also said to be a "well-known equestrian" who won awards in her teenage years, and enjoyed riding bicycles. Apart from her brothers, she had two sisters: Carlotta Packard and Cornelia Olive Packard.

In 1890, she was put in charge of the New York and Ohio plant, which was unusual, as few women were running factories at that time. It later became the Ohio Lamp Division. Her management of the plant has been described as "quite an achievement." On November 8, 1893, she married Ephraim B. McCrum, a close friend of her brother, William. She had one child, Esther, in November 1894, before divorcing him in 1900. At that time, she and Esther were living in a hospital in Columbus, Ohio. Esther died in April 1902 from pneumonia.

She married a second time, in 1905, to James B. Davidson, a man originally from Warren who the family knew well. By 1910, they were living in Pittsburgh, Pennsylvania. The following year, she purchased land in Accotink, Virginia, near Mount Vernon, where she and her husband, known as Jim, lived until their deaths, raising horses.

== FBI career ==
On October 11, 1922, at age 54, Davidson was hired by director William J. Burns to work at the Bureau of Investigation (the former name of the FBI) as a special investigator. She was the first female special agent. Trained in New York City, she was later assigned to the Washington, D.C. field office. Her starting salary was $7 a day plus $4 when traveling. She was said to be earning the equivalent of $102 a day in present-day value. It has also been alleged that an attorney encouraged her to join the agency. In a 1927 letter, Harriet Taylor Upton stated that she encouraged Attorney General Harry M. Daugherty to hire Davidson, and said that she was surprised that he appointed her to the BOI, under Burns, where she got, a "$2300.00 a year salary", in her words, driving "back and forth from her plantation" every day for her work.

The Bureau was interested in hiring female agents to work on cases related to the Mann Act, which aimed to combat interstate sex trafficking. However, since she was considered "very refined", the order was given that she wasn't to be put on "rough" cases. This, combined with her limited schooling, meant that she was considered to be of limited use when it came to prosecuting such crimes. During her work at the Washington field office, she was also involved in a case against another agent who was selling classified Department of Justice information to criminals. She also informed the agency about the activities of the Women's International League for Peace and Freedom, at the organization's Fourth International Congress in May 1924, under the name "A.P. Davidson".

After J. Edgar Hoover became acting director of the Bureau in 1924 following the Teapot Dome scandal, he asked for Davidson's resignation when the Special Agent in Charge at the Washington field office reported that he had "no particular work for a woman agent". She resigned on June 10, 1924. Before her resignation, she gave testimony before a select committee of the United States House of Representatives about her surveillance of Gaston B. Means in October 1923, watching movement in and out of Means' house, and again in March 1924.

Only three women became agents in the 1920s. With the resignation of Davidson and fellow agent Jessie B. Duckstein in 1924 and Lenore Houston in 1928, the FBI had no female agents between 1929 and 1972. While the FBI claims that Davidson and Duckstein resigned as "part of the Bureau’s reduction of force", scholar Meredith Donovan writes that Hoover fired both women during a round of cuts at the agency in May 1924. The FBI also notes, on the agency's official website, that in the 1920s, expectations for agents "changed to a patriarchal approach as to what positions were appropriate for women."

== Later life ==
In 1925, after the death of her brother, William, she signed a petition, along with her sisters, brother, and other individuals, to the New York Supreme Court Appellate Division calling for appraisal of a transfer tax of property owned by William, known as Packard Manor, in the State of New York.

Davidson exchanged letters, in May 1927, with Carrie Chapman Catt. Catt told her about a story she heard from her friend, Harriet Taylor Upton, about a list of suffragettes which were reportedly compiled by the Bureau of Investigation, with information provided by Mary Kilberth and Robert Eichelberger. Catt asked that Davidson let her be named if the government inquired into the list, to which Davidson agreed to, and remembered the list, but only vaguely. Catt, writing to Davidson in June 1927, later apologized for not responding more promptly to Davidson's letter. The same month, Upton wrote to Catt, calling Davidson someone she had known "for years" and a sister of "the Packard men who made the Packard machine." She further commented that Davidson has married "rather unfortunately," and noted that Davidson had thrown the list into the waste basket.

In May 1929, Davidson's husband, Jim, passed away. She continued living in Virginia, with her dogs, until her death. Davidson died on July 16, 1934, at the age of 66. She was buried in Paltzgrove Cemetery, in Lordstown, Ohio.

== Legacy ==
Despite the fact that she was fired by the FBI in 1924, the agency still mentioned her in their post celebrating women who worked as agents for the Bureau. Cindee Mines, a volunteer with the National Packard Museum, stated that Davidson lived an "unusual life" and argued that she was "ahead of her time." Others called Davidson, along with other women in the same Packard family, "trailblazers in their own right."

The mention of Davidson as the first female FBI agent by Lana Kane in the Archer episode, "Waxing Gibbous" was noted as an example of the show's habit of using obscure references. In its review of the episode, Vulture noted that Kane has "pointed dialogue" about disappointing hiring practices of intelligence sector, including a "shout-out" to Davidson, who is described as a "trailblazing agent."
