= Chaz Coleman =

American football player (born 2006)

Profile
- Position: Defensive end

Personal information
- Born: December 6, 2006 (age 19)
- Listed height: 6 ft 4 in (1.93 m)
- Listed weight: 250 lb (113 kg)

Career information
- High school: Warren G. Harding (Warren, Ohio)
- College: Penn State (2025)
- Stats at ESPN

Chaz Larin Coleman (born December 6, 2006) is an American college football defensive end. He previously played for the Penn State Nittany Lions.

== Personal life ==
Chaz Coleman was born December 6, 2006. Coleman was a class of 2025 Warren G. Harding High School in Warren, Ohio, where Coleman was a multi-sport athlete including football and basketball. Coleman played quarterback and linebacker for the Raiders football team. As a senior in football, he was the Trumbull County Player of the Year after finishing with 749 passing yards with 10 touchdowns, 751 rushing yards with seven touchdowns, and four receptions for 89 yards and two touchdowns on offense and four sacks, three interceptions, and two touchdowns on defense. As a senior in basketball, Coleman averaged 20 points and 10 rebounds per game with 15 double-doubles, Coleman was named as the 2025 All-American Conference Player of the Year and was also named to the All-Ohio Division II First Team and was the Division II District Player of the Year.

== College career ==
After graduating from high school, Coleman committed to Penn State. Coleman competed for immediate playing time at defensive end his true freshman season at Penn state in 2025. In his second career game, he recorded four tackles, a strip sack and a fumble recovery. He finished the year with 8 total tackles, 3 sacks, 1 tackle for loss, 2 fumble recoveries and a forced fumble. In January 2026, Coleman entered the transfer portal, committing to the University of Tennessee for his sophomore year, however, was medically disqualified by the team on June 26th.

=== College Football Stats ===
| Season | Team | GP | Tackles | | | | | Interceptions | | | | | Fumbles | |
| Season | Team | GP | Cmb | Solo | Ast | Sck | Tfl | Int | Yds | Avg | TD | PD | FF | FR |
|---|---|---|---|---|---|---|---|---|---|---|---|---|---|---|
| 2025 | Penn State | 9 | 9 | 6 | 2 | 3.0 | 1.0 | 0 | 0 | 0.0 | 0 | 1 | 1 | 2 |
