= Shaheed Davis =

American basketball player

Personal information
- Born: February 14, 1994 (age 32) Warren, Ohio, U.S.
- Listed height: 6 ft 9 in (2.06 m)
- Listed weight: 210 lb (95 kg)

Career information
- High school: Warren G. Harding (Warren, Ohio)
- College: Polk State (2012–2013); Eastern Florida (2013–2014); UCF (2014–2016)
- NBA draft: 2016: undrafted
- Playing career: 2016–present
- Position: Power forward

Career history
- 2016: Sheffield Sharks
- 2016–2017: Al-Naft
- 2017: Academic Plovdiv
- 2017: Feni Industries
- 2017–2018: Cherkaski Mavpy
- 2018–2019: Pallacanestro Cantù
- 2019–2021: Fukushima Firebonds
- 2021: Kumamoto Volters
- 2021: Hapoel Eilat
- 2021–2022: Alba Fehérvár
- 2022: Lavrio
- 2022–2023: Tainan TSG GhostHawks
- 2023: Maccabi Haifa
- 2023: Anorthosis Ammochostou
- 2023: Al Morog
- 2023–2024: Sigal Prishtina
- 2024–2025: Shabab Al Ahli
- 2025: Guayamas
- 2025: Trotamundos

Career highlights
- Balkan League champion (2024); USL champion (2018); USL All-Star (2018)

Shaheed Davis (born February 14, 1994) is an American professional basketball player who most recently played for the Trotamundos de Carabobo of the Venezuelan SuperLiga He graduated from the University of Central Florida, where he played for the UCF Knights men's basketball team from 2014 to 2016.

== Personal life ==
Shaheed Davis was born February 14, 1994 in Warren, Ohio. Davis graduated from Warren G. Harding High School in 2012. Davis was a 2011 AP All-Northeast Ohio Inland District Honorable Mention in basketball.

== College career ==
After graduation, Davis committed to Polk State. He later transferred to Eastern Florida in 2013 where he averaged 11 points, 5 rebounds and 1.8 blocks per game. He transferred again to UCF in 2014.

During the 2014-15 season, the appeared in 24 games and made 6 starts, he averaged 4.4 points per game and named to the American Weekly Honor Roll for his performance vs. Stetson. In his senior year in the 2015-16 season, David averaged 5.9 points per game and 4.4 rebounds, while starting 12 of 13 games. he posted a career-high 23 points against UNC Greensboro, going 9-of-15 from the floor and 5-for-8 from behind the arc.

== Professional career ==
After graduating from UCF Knights in 2016, he declared for the 2016 NBA Draft, however Davis went undrafted.

=== Sheffield Sharks ===
on July 28, 2016, he signed with Sheffield Sharks.

=== Academic Plovdiv ===
On 24 February 2017, Davis agreed terms with Academic Plovdiv.

=== Feni Industries ===
On 20 August 2017, he signed with Macedonian basketball club Feni Industries. In 4 games for Feni Industries, he averaged 27.8 points and 12.3 rebounds.

=== Cherkasi Mavpy ===
On November 2, 2017, he signed with Cherkaski Mavpy.

On January 26, 2018 he was awarded the Ukrainian Superleage All Star MVP award after scoring 34 points, 8 rebounds, 6 assists and 4 steals.

=== Pallacanestro Cantù ===
On June 13, 2018, Davis signed with the Italian basketball club Pallacanestro Cantù of the LBA.

=== Fukushima Firebonds ===
On August 15, 2019, Davis signed with Fukushima Firebonds of the B.League. On May 29, 2020, he re-signed with Fukushima Firebonds. On January 6, 2021, his contract was terminated. On January 22, he signed a short-term contract with Kumamoto Volters of the B.League. On March 12, his contract was extended until the end of the season.

=== The Basketball Tournament ===
Davis joined War Tampa, a team composed primarily of Auburn alumni in The Basketball Tournament 2020. He scored seven points in a 76–53 loss to House of 'Paign in the first round.

=== Hapoel Eilat ===
In October 2021, Davis joined Hapoel Eilat of the Israeli Basketball Premier League.

=== Alba Fehérvár ===
On December 24, 2021, Davis signed with Alba Fehérvár of the Nemzeti Bajnokság I/A.

=== Laviro ===
On October 6, 2022, Davis signed with Lavrio of the Greek Basketball League.

=== Tainan TSG GhostHawks ===
On December 15, 2022, Davis signed with the Tainan TSG GhostHawks of the T1 League. On January 13, 2023, his contract was terminated.

=== Maccabi Hafiia ===
On January 17, 2023, Davis signed with Maccabi Haifa of the Liga Artzit.

=== Anorthosis Ammochostou ===
On March 1, 2023, Davis signed with Anorthosis Ammochostou of the Cyprus Basketball Division A.

=== Al Morog ===
On April 16, 2023, Davis signed with Al Morog of the Libyan Division I Basketball League.

=== Sigal Prishtina ===
On October 2, 2023, Davis signed with Sigal Prishtina of the Kosovo Basketball Superleague.

=== Shabab Al Ahli ===
In October 2024, Davis joined Shabab Al Ahli of the UAE National Basketball League.

=== Ostioneros de Guaymas ===
On March 7, 2025, Davis joined Ostioneros de Guaymas of the Circuito de Baloncesto de la Costa del Pacífico (CIBACOPA)

=== Trotamundos de Carabobo ===
On April 24, 2025, Davis joined the Trotamundos de Carabobo of the Venezuelan SuperLiga.
