= David L. Gray =

American author and radio host

David Gray
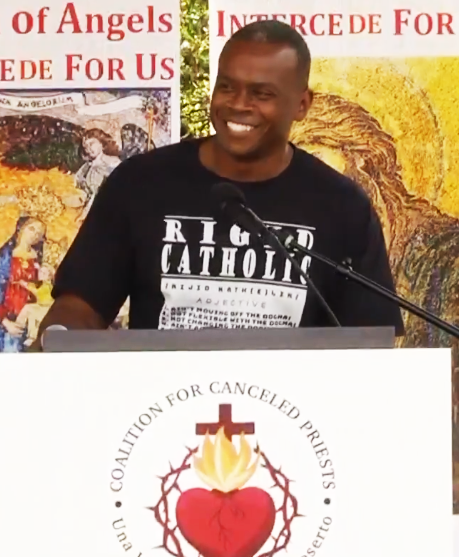
- Gray in 2021
- Born: 1972 (age 53–54); Warren, Ohio, United States
- Education: Central State University (BA); Ohio Dominican University (MA)
- Occupations: Author, theologian, radio host, and public speaker
- Spouse: Felicia Gray (m. 2016)
- Children: 4
- Parent(s): Oscar Scott; Gwendolyn McCullough

YouTube information
- Channel: David Gray
- Years active: 2010–present
- Subscribers: 29,000
- Last updated: 26 September 2026
- Website: www.davidlgray.info

David L. Gray (born 1972) is an American Catholic theologian, author, speaker, and media host. He is the president and publisher of Saint Dominic's Media and is a Catholic convert from Agnosticism/Deism. Prior to his conversion to Catholicism, he was a Freemason and an author and speaker on the history of Prince Hall Freemasonry.

== Biography ==
David Gray was born in 1972 to Oscar Scott and Gwendolyn McCullough and was raised in Warren, Ohio. After battling academic challenges as a child, he went on to graduate from Warren G. Harding High School in 1991, and then from Central State University in 1997 with a bachelor of science degree in business management. After converting to Catholicism, he studied at Franciscan University of Steubenville and later earned his Master of Arts in Theology from Ohio Dominican University in 2017. After graduating from Ohio Dominican University, Gray founded Saint Dominic's Media, which has produced titles concerning Catholic liturgical theology and Catholic history. In 2025, Gray began studying for a Doctorate of Ministry in Liturgical Catechesis from The Catholic University of America.

Prior to his conversion to Catholicism, Gray was a Freemason, and, as such, he authored the book Inside Prince Hall and had become District Deputy Grand Lecturer of the Prince Hall Grand Lodge of Ohio, an appointed officer in the Ohio Lodge of Research of the Grand Lodge of Ohio, the 2002 Australian & New Zealand Masonic Research Council touring lecturer, elected a Fellow in the Phylaxis Society, co-founder and first editor-in-chief of the Dr. Charles Wesley Masonic Research Society, and elected to the Brotherhood of the Blue Forget Me Not, a mainstream US based organization, for his contributions to Masonic education.

After growing up nominally Protestant and frequenting the African Methodist Episcopal Church, Gray has stated he owes his conversion to Catholicism through an encounter in 2004 with Jesus who audibly spoke to him while he was in the process of attempting suicide, and then later attending a Catholic Mass, which eventually lead him to enter the Catholic Church in 2006, while still incarcerated (2004 - 2010) on charges related to embezzlement.

From January 13, 2021, to early 2022, the David L. Gray Show - Voicing Truth and Reason was added to the Guadalupe Radio Network lineup. This weekly talk format program consisted of monologues and guest interviews on various aspects of the Catholic faith, with a politically-right perspective on social topics.

== Bibliography ==
=== Non-fiction ===
==== Freemasonry ====
- Inside Prince Hall --- (Anchor Communications, LLC, 2004)
- History of the Most Worshipful Prince Hall Grand Lodge of Ohio F&AM 1971-2011: The Fabric of Freemasonry --- (MWPHGL of Ohio, 2012)
- The Catholic Catechism on Freemasonry: A Theological and Historical Treatment on the Catholic Church's Prohibition Against Freemasonry and its Appendant Masonic Bodies --- (Saint Dominic's Media, 2020)
- Compendium of the Catholic Catechism on Freemasonry: A Theological and Historical Treatment on the Catholic Church's Prohibition Against Freemasonry and its Appendant Masonic Bodies --- (Saint Dominic's Media, 2023)

==== Apologetics and spirituality ====
- Dead on Arrival: The Seven Fatal Errors of Sola-Scriptura (Bible Only) --- (self-published, 2010)
- Cooperating with God: Life with the Cross --- (self-published, 2012)
- Cooperating with God: The Bridegroom's Prayer --- (self-published, 2012)
- Artificial Intelligence Proves Catholicism is True --- (Saint Dominic's Media, 2026)

==== Liturgical theology ====
- The Divine Symphony: An Exordium to the Theology of the Catholic Mass --- (Saint Dominic's Media, 2018)
- The Liturgical Sense of the Readings at Mass - Year A --- (Saint Dominic's Media, 2025)
- The Liturgical Sense of the Readings at Mass - Year B --- (Saint Dominic's Media, 2026)
- The Liturgical Sense of the Readings at Mass - Year A (Second Edition) --- (Saint Dominic's Media, 2026)

==== As editor, contributor ====
- Catholic, Traditional & Black: In Anthology and Discourse (Editor, Contributor) --- (Saint Dominic's Media, 2022)
- Return to the Sacred: Dispelling the Darkness in the World (Editor, Contributor) --- (Saint Dominic's Media, 2026)

=== Fiction ===
- Article 7 --- (Saint Dominic's Media, 2026)
