= Chris Rucker =

American football player (born 1988)

No. 36
- Position: Cornerback

Personal information
- Born: October 12, 1988 (age 38); Warren, Ohio, U.S.
- Listed height: 6 ft 1 in (1.85 m)
- Listed weight: 195 lb (88 kg)

Career information
- High school: Warren G. Harding (Warren)
- College: Michigan State
- NFL draft: 2011: 6th round, 188th overall pick

Career history
- Indianapolis Colts (2011–2012); Ottawa Redblacks (2014)*
- * Offseason or practice squad member only

Awards and highlights
- Second-team All-Big Ten (2010)

Career NFL statistics
- Total tackles: 37
- Fumble recoveries: 1
- Pass deflections: 2
- Stats at Pro Football Reference

Chris L. Rucker (born October 12, 1988) is an American former professional football player who was a defensive back for the Indianapolis Colts of the National Football League (NFL). He played college football for the Michigan State Spartans. He was selected by the Colts in the sixth round of the 2011 NFL draft.

== Personal life ==
Chris Rucker was born October 12, 1988, in Warren, Ohio. He was a standout football player at Warren G. Harding High School, earning all-conference and all-state honors and was regarded as one of the top defensive backs in the region. Rucker owns Harding school record, 11 interceptions in a career.

== College career ==
Rucker played for the Michigan State Spartans from 2007 to 2010. During his collegiate career, he developed into one of the team’s top defensive backs and a key contributor in the secondary.

As a senior in 2010, Rucker earned second-team All-Big Ten honors after recording multiple interceptions and pass breakups while helping lead Michigan State to a Big Ten co-championship and a berth in the 2011 Capital One Bowl. He finished his college career with over 190 tackles and 6 interceptions.

== Professional career ==
Pre-draft measurables
Height	Weight	Arm length	Hand span	Wingspan	40-yard dash	10-yard split	20-yard split	20-yard shuttle	Three-cone drill	Vertical jump	Broad jump	Bench press
6 ft 0 1/2 in (1.84 m)	195 lb (88 kg)	33 in (0.84 m)	9 in (0.23 m)	6 ft 4 in (1.93 m)	4.54 s	1.65 s	2.68 s	4.35 s	6.87 s	33.5 in (0.85 m)	9 ft 11 in (3.02 m)	13 reps
All values from NFL Combine/Pro Day

=== Indianapolis Colts ===
Rucker was selected by the Indianapolis Colts with the 188th pick in the 2011 NFL draft. Rucker appeared in 15 games as a rookie, starting 4 of those. Rucker totaled 37 tackles including 26 solo and 11 assists, 1 fumble recovery and 2 pass deflections. He was waived by the Colts prior to his second season on August 26, 2012.

=== Ottawa Redblacks ===
Rucker was signed to the Ottawa Redblacks' practice squad in August 2014. He was released by the Redblacks on October 14, 2014.
