= Warren G. Harding High School =

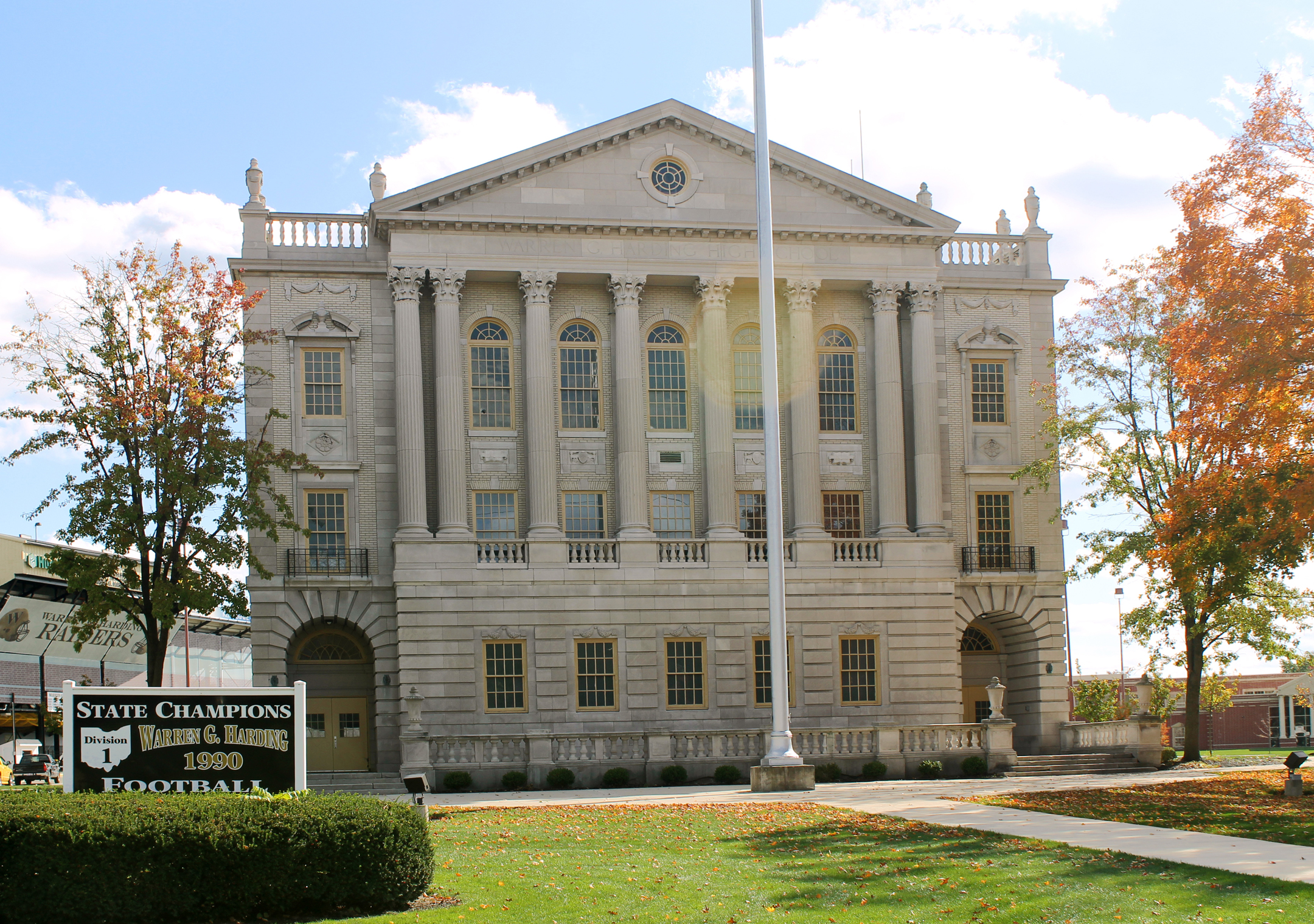
- The former Warren G. Harding High School facade, located in front of the current complex.

Location
- 860 Elm Road NE; Warren, Ohio 44483; United States

Information
- Type: Public high school
- Established: 1926
- School district: Warren City School District
- NCES School ID: 390449901922
- Principal: Janis Ulicny
- Teaching staff: 73.46 (on an FTE basis)
- Grades: 9–12
- Enrollment: 1,221 (2024–25)
- Student to teacher ratio: 16.62
- Colors: Black and gold
- Athletics conference: All-American Conference
- Team name: Raiders
- Website: www.warrenschools.k12.oh.us/wgh/

Warren G. Harding High School is a public high school in Warren, Ohio, United States. It is the only high school in the Warren City School District. Athletic teams are known as the Raiders, and they compete as a member of the Ohio High School Athletic Association in the All-American Conference.

== History ==
With population growth in Warren, Ohio in the early 1920s, the Warren Board of Education planned to replace the old high school building on Monroe Street. The BOE stated the old location became too overcrowded and outdated. The bond issue to replace the high school was placed on the ballot in November 1923, asking voters to approve of the bond to secure funding to build the new high school on the corner on Elm Road and Atlantic Street, which was approved that election. The BOE named the high school after 29th U.S. President Warren G. Harding, who died in office just a few months prior in August 1923. Warren G. Harding High School was built in 1926.

Due to the declining population in Warren, along with declining enrollment and budget constraints, neighboring Western Reserve High School which remained in operation since the mid-1960s, consolidated with Warren G. Harding in 1990, once again becoming the sole high school of Warren, Ohio.

A new campus was built adjacent to its old one in 2008. A facade was kept from demolition and stands in front of the current high school campus.

== Extracurricular programs ==
=== Warren Student Communication Network ===
Warren G. Harding High School offers a broadcasting/multimedia class. Each day the class put together a show of the day's announcements. Students must pass a Beginning Broadcasting class and obtain permission from school faculty. Students in this class also produce music videos, PTVs, Public Service Announcements (PSAs), and other projects which are broadcast on the school's television station Warren Student Communication Network (WSCN), and other local television channels.

=== Computer graphics and animation ===
Warren G. Harding High School offers a computer graphics and animation program.

=== Mobile STEM lab ===
Warren G. Harding offers STEM program that includes a mobile lab equipped with a 3-dimenstional printing farm, a 55-inch interactive smart panel, 9 computer workstations, including a wheelchair accessible workstation. The lab allows students to participate in computer science, robotics, 3D printing and other activities.

=== Band and Choir ===
Warren G. Harding High School offers Band and Choir. Their Marching Band has been invited to play in several national events, including the 2004 Macy's Thanksgiving Day Parade, the National Memorial Day Parade in 2010, Pittsburgh Celebrate the Season Parade in 2007 and 2009, the Apple Blossom Parade in 2018 and 2024 along with many others. Warren G. Harding's choir offers several variations including the madrigals and new tomorrows where the students dance and sing on stage. Traditional groups include the a cappella choir, the concert choir, and the freshman chorale.

=== FIRST Robotics ===
Warren G. Harding Team E.L.I.T.E. 48 (Encouraging Learning in Technology and Engineering) is a FIRST Robotics Competition team. Each year FIRST creates a new game/challenge, and every team has six weeks to design and manufacture a robot to complete the given tasks.

=== Quiz bowl/academic team ===
The Warren G. Harding quiz bowl team is regularly ranked within the top 100 of the nation. In 2012 the team won the school's first state championship in the activity, led by senior Michael Coates.

== Athletics ==
Warren G. Harding High School currently offers:

- Baseball
- Basketball
- Bowling
- Cheerleading
- Cross country
- Golf
- Girls' flag football
- Football
- Soccer
- Softball
- Swimming
- Tennis
- Track and field
- Volleyball

=== State championships ===
- Baseball – 1933
- Football – 1974, 1990
- Boys' track and field – 2010

==== Associated Press state championships ====
- Football – 1971, 1974, 2002, 2003

=== Facilities ===
==== Mollenkopf Stadium ====
Mollenkopf Stadium, built in 1934 and located adjacent to the high school, it is the athletic stadium of the Warren G. Harding Raiders and historically, the home of the former Warren Western Reserve Raiders and Warren John F. Kennedy Eagles football and soccer teams. The stadium features a turf field which was installed in 2005 and reworked in 2016, with the Raider logo centered in the middle of the field, a band shell and a video scoreboard. The stadium is able to seat up to 15,000 people. The stadium was named after Milton E. Mollenkopf, a long-time principal of 41 years and coach at the school. The stadium has undergone numerous renovations between 2025 and 2026, including structural repairs to the home bleachers and renovations to the restrooms in July 2025, as well as a complete reconstruction of the 100-year-old east side away stands which began in October 2025, and is set to be completed prior to the start of the new school year in 2026.

==== Student Recreation and Wellness Center ====
In 2024, Warren G. Harding High School built and opened a new Student Recreation and Wellness center, located adjacent to Mollenkopf Stadium, it features fitness amenities such as an indoor track, locker rooms, an artificial turf field, weight room, etc., as well as study and lounge rooms along with space for robotics and E-Sports programs. It also has a health clinic which is operated by Akron Children's Pediatrics.

== Notable alumni ==
Warren High Schools' Distinguished Alumni Hall of Fame was launched in 1993. notable distinguished alumni include:

- Roger Ailes – former president and CEO of Fox News Network
- David Arnold – former professional football player in the National Football League (NFL)
- Lynn Bowden – former professional football player in the National Football League (NFL)
- Prescott Burgess – former professional football player in the National Football League (NFL)
- Michael Capellas – current CEO of WorldCom
- Joe Carroll – former professional football player in the National Football League (NFL)
- John Chickerneo – former professional football player in the National Football League (NFL)
- Maurice Clarett – former college football player
- Chaz Coleman - college football defensive end
- James Daniels – professional football player in the National Football League (NFL)
- LeShun Daniels – former professional football player in the National Football League (NFL)
- LeShun Daniels Sr. – former professional football player in the National Football League (NFL)
- Shaheed Davis - professional basketball player
- Earl Derr Biggers – former novelist
- David L. Gray - catholic theologian, author, speaker, and radio show host
- Daniel Herron – former professional football player in the National Football League (NFL)
- David Herron – former professional football player in the National Football League (NFL)
- Sean Jones – musician, lead trumpeter for Jazz at Lincoln Center Orchestra, composer
- Bill Kollar – former professional football player in the National Football League (NFL)
- Kay'Ron Lynch-Adams –professional football player
- Mario Manningham – former professional football player in the National Football League (NFL)
- John Ness Beck – composer of religious music
- Ronald Parise – former astronaut
- Kenneth Patchen – former poet
- Chris Rucker –former professional football player in the National Football League (NFL)
- Korey Stringer – former professional football player in the National Football League (NFL)
- Ed Stroud – Major League Baseball player (1966–1971)
- Paul Warfield – former professional football player in the National Football League (NFL)
- Bill White – former professional baseball player in the Major League Baseball (MLB), broadcaster and National League president
