= Joe Carroll (American football) =

American football player (born 1950)

No. 51
- Position: Linebacker

Personal information
- Born: May 29, 1950 (age 76); Warren, Ohio, U.S.
- Listed height: 6 ft 1 in (1.85 m)
- Listed weight: 220 lb (100 kg)

Career information
- High school: Warren G. Harding
- College: Pittsburgh
- NFL draft: 1972: 11th round, 277th overall pick

Career history
- Oakland Raiders (1972–1973)
- Stats at Pro Football Reference

Joseph Walker Carroll (born May 29, 1950) is an American former professional football linebacker. He played for the Oakland Raiders from 1972 to 1973.

Carroll attended Warren G. Harding High School in Warren, Ohio. In his junior year he made the first team, All-Ohio UPI defensive team as a defensive end. After graduating, he went to Pitt, where he played linebacker, and was a starter as a sophomore. However he was injured in mid-October during the Navy game and missed the remainder of the season. The following year he was back in the starting line-up and considered one of the top defensive prospects in the country. During the 1972 NFL draft, Carroll was selected in the 11th round by the Oakland Raiders, the 277th pick in the draft. He was the only college player from Pennsylvania picked in the draft. After beginning the 1974 season with the Raiders, he was cut in September, as they pared their roster back to 47.
