= John Ness Beck =

American composer and arranger

- Born: 11 November 1930
- Died: 25 June 1987 (aged 56)
- Genres: Sacred Music
- Occupation: composer

John Ness Beck (November 11, 1930 – June 25, 1987) was an American composer and arranger of choral music, best known for his settings of traditional Sacred music. His works are frequently performed by high school, college, church, community, and professional choirs across the globe today.

== Biography ==
John Ness Beck was born in Warren, Ohio. After graduating from Warren G. Harding High School in 1948, he enrolled at The Ohio State University. In 1952 he graduated from Ohio State with Bachelor of Arts and Bachelor of Science degrees with a major in English. After working for a year in Student Union activities at the State College of Washington, he spent two years in the U.S. Army. During this time, he became increasingly involved in arranging for various musical groups. After his discharge from military service, he returned to Ohio State and completed Bachelor of Music and Master of Arts degrees in music with composition as his major.

Beck was a faculty member of the Ohio State University School of Music for seven years, teaching harmony and theory. He left the university to become owner and manager of The University Music House, a retail sheet music store in Columbus. In this capacity, he was able to observe the business side of the music industry, gaining insight into the complexities of music publishing and merchandising. As his compositions found their way into print and popularity, he joined forces in 1972 with John Tatgenhorst in the creation of Beckenhorst Press. His reputation as a composer and his experience as a choral director soon led to an increasing demand for appearances as guest conductor and lecturer at various musical clinics and festivals throughout the country. He remained active in the field until his death from cancer in 1987.

== John Ness Beck Foundation ==
Beck established the John Ness Beck Foundation in 1987, only a few months before his death. The Foundation was established in memory of Randall Thompson and Joseph W. Clokey. It recognizes outstanding achievement in choral composition and arrangement of traditional church music, enhances and furthers the careers, study, education and experience of promising composers and arrangers, and promotes and stimulates the learning of choral composition and traditional church music.

The stated goal of the foundation is to encourage and promote the writing of traditional sacred music. The Foundation has sought to honor this goal in several ways. For several years, scholarships were awarded to students from the Westminster Choir College and the Southern Baptist Theological Seminary who exhibited promise in the writing of sacred choral music. At present, the Foundation has embarked on a program which recognizes current composers of traditional sacred choral music by selecting two compositions yearly which best exemplify the type of writing that fit the criteria set forth by John Beck.

== Arrangements and compositions ==
- Amazing Grace
- America the Beautiful
- And in That Day
- And the Child Grew
- Anthem of Unity
- The Armor of God
- As the Rain
- Assurance
- Battle Cry of Freedom
- Benediction (God Be With You Til We Meet Again)
- Canticle of Praise
- Celebration
- A Child's Noel
- Christmas Carols and Codas
- --- Angels We Have Heard On High
- --- The First Noel
- --- Good Christian Men, Rejoice
- --- Hark! The Herald Angels Sing
- --- Joy to the World
- --- While Shepherds Watched Their Flocks
- Christmas Welcome
- Consecration
- Contemporary Music for the Church Service
- Cry Aloud
- Devotion
- Divided Our Pathways
- Ease My Mind, Lord
- Easter Canticle
- The Easter Vigil of Mary Magdalene
- Every Perfect Gift
- Every Valley
- Exhortation
- Faith of Our Fathers
- Foundation
- Gethsemane
- Gloria
- The God of Abraham Praise
- God of Grace
- Have Ye Not Known?
- He Shall Feed His Flock
- Help Us Accept Each Other
- A Holy Festival
- A Hymn for Advent
- Hymn for Easter Day
- Hymn for Our Time
- Hymn of Courage
- Hymn of Fellowship
- Hymn to David
- Hymn to God the Father
- I Can Do All Things
- I Need Thee Every Hour
- If You Love Me
- In Heavenly Love
- In Memoriam
- Interpreted By Love
- It Is Well With My Soul
- A Joyful Noise
- Jubilant Canticle
- Jubilo, Jubilate
- The King of Love My Shepherd Is
- Kingsfold [I Feel the Winds of God Today]
- Let Us Break Bread Together
- Litany of Thanksgiving
- Look for a Sunrise
- Lord, Here Am I
- Lullaby
- The Name of Jesus
- A New Heart I Will Give You
- O Come, Let Us Sing
- O for a Thousand Tongues to Sing
- O Love That Will Not Let Me Go
- Of the Father's Love Begotten
- Offertory
- Once in Royal David's City
- Osanna
- Prayer to Jesus
- Psalm 24
- Psalm 46
- Psalm 67
- Psalm 121
- The Quiet Heart
- Rejoice in the Lord Alway
- Rejoice, the Lord Is King
- The Shepherds
- Sing Unto Him
- Something
- Song of Exaltation
- Song of Hope
- Song of Moses
- Song of the Apostle
- Speak to Me, Lord
- The Spirit Leads On and On
- A Spiritual Song
- Still, Still With Thee
- Strong Son of God, Immortal Love
- The Sunlit Hour
- Tenting Tonight
- Thanksgiving!
- There's a Song in the Air
- Thou Art God!
- Two Carols for Advent
- Upon This Rock
- Variants On an Irish Hymn
- Victory
- Visions of St. John
- We Gather Together
- When Morning Gilds the Skies
- Where Is the Child?
- Who Shall Separate Us?
- Ye Shall Go Out With Joy
- The Young Lions
