= Prescott Burgess =

American football player (born 1984)

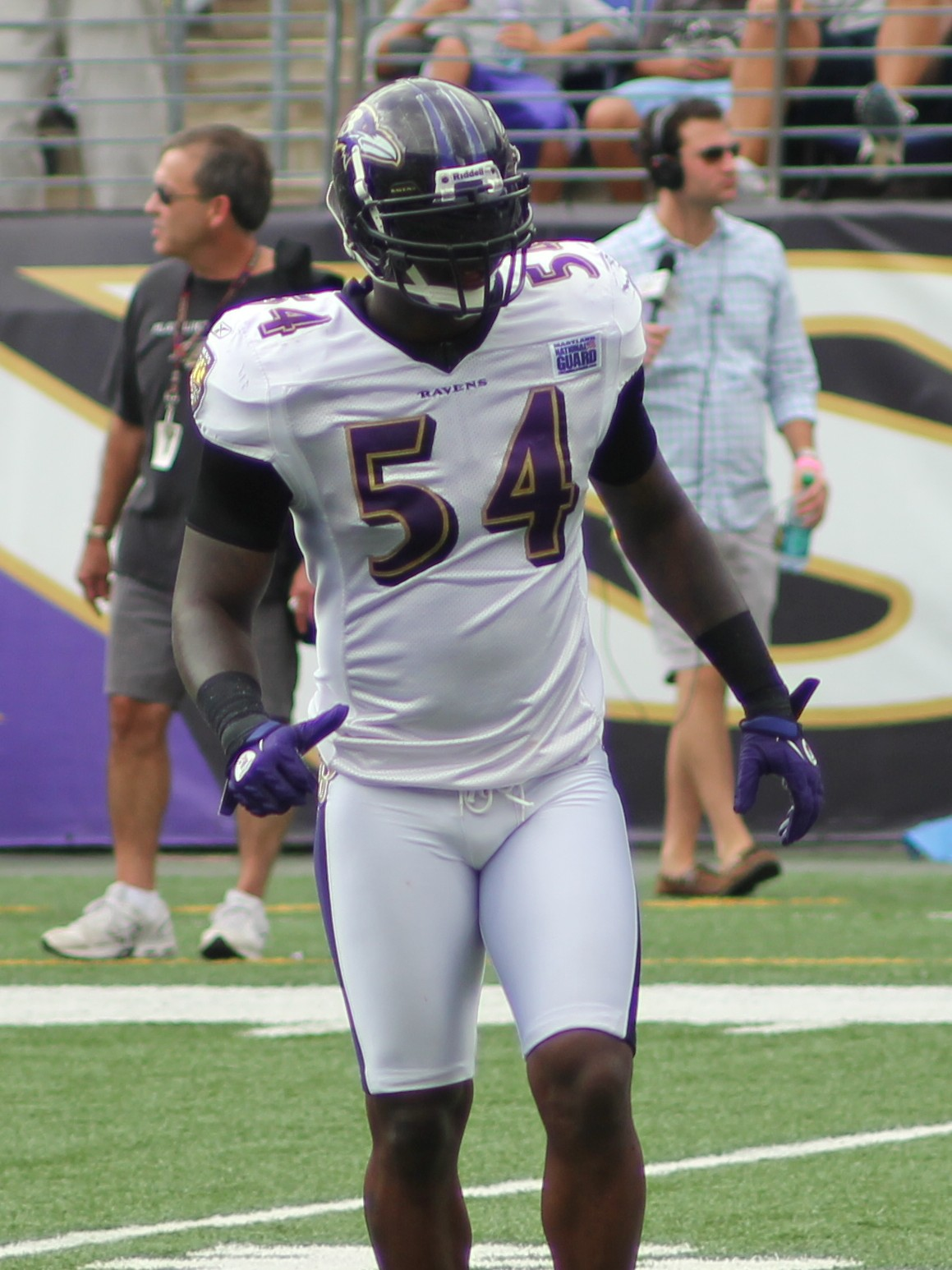
- Burgess at practice at M&T Bank Stadium in August 2011 during his second stint with the team.

No. 54
- Position: Linebacker / Special teamer

Personal information
- Born: March 6, 1984 (age 42); Warren, Ohio, U.S.
- Listed height: 6 ft 3 in (1.91 m)
- Listed weight: 247 lb (112 kg)

Career information
- High school: Warren G. Harding (Warren)
- College: Michigan
- NFL draft: 2007: 6th round, 207th overall pick

Career history
- Baltimore Ravens (2007–2009); New England Patriots (2009); Baltimore Ravens (2009–2011)

Career NFL statistics
- Total tackles: 38
- Stats at Pro Football Reference

Prescott Ennis Burgess (born March 6, 1984) is an American former professional football player who was a linebacker and special teamer in the National Football League (NFL). He was selected by the Baltimore Ravens in the sixth round of the 2007 NFL draft. He played college football for the Michigan Wolverines. Burgess was also a member of the New England Patriots.

== Early life ==
Prescott Burgess was born March 6, 1984, in Warren, Ohio. Burgess attended Warren G. Harding High School in Warren, Ohio. He ranked among the nation's best linebackers and defensive backs.

== College career ==
After graduating from high school, Burgess attended the University of Michigan. He started 20 of the 46 games he played in and was named an All-Big Ten Conference honorable mention in 2005 and 2006.

== Professional career ==
=== Baltimore Ravens ===
Burgess was selected in the sixth round (207th overall) in the 2007 NFL draft by the Baltimore Ravens. He played in his first eight games for Baltimore, recording four tackles before being placed on injured reserve with a hip injury on November 14. He missed the entire 2008 season, after being placed on injured reserve on August 11 with a broken forearm. Burgess played in the first two games of the 2009 season for the Ravens, picking up two tackles.

=== New England Patriots ===
Burgess was traded to the New England Patriots on September 22, 2009, in exchange for a conditional seventh round draft choice. He was inactive for the Patriots' Week 3 game and waived on September 28. The trade was conditioned on the games Burgess was active for the Patriots; therefore, the Ravens did not receive any compensation from the Patriots. He was re-signed to the Patriots' practice squad on September 30, in advance of their Week 4 against the Ravens, who would have not been allowed to sign Burgess back off the Patriots' practice squad because of this matchup.

=== Baltimore Ravens (second stint) ===
On October 5, the day after their game with the Patriots, the Ravens signed Prescott Burgess off the Patriots' practice squad to take the place of Brendan Ayanbadejo, who went on injured reserve.

Burgess continued his role as a backup with Baltimore in 2009 and 2010.

On September 3, 2011, Burgess was released during final cuts. He was re-signed by the Baltimore Ravens on September 28, when Baltimore cornerback Dominique Foxworth was placed on injured reserve. Burgess was active for one game, with no statistics. He was waived again on October 4, after Baltimore signed cornerback Bryan McCann. He was re-signed on October 18. He was placed on Injured Reserve November 2, 2011, and the team signed Edgar Jones as a replacement. He was taken off Injured Reserve on December 3, 2011, and immediately released from the team.

While not seeing much time on defense during his stints with the Ravens, he did establish himself as a special teams standout, becoming one of their top tacklers in that unit.
