= Bill Kollar =

American football player and coach (born 1952)

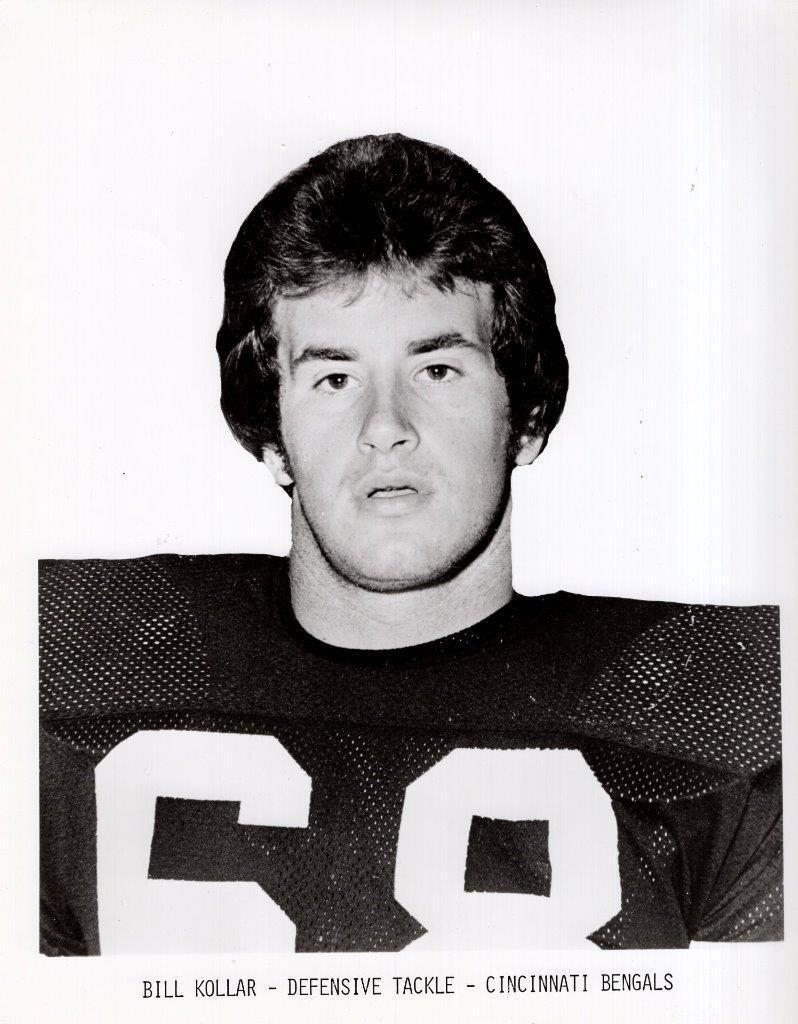
- Kollar with the Cincinnati Bengals

No. 68, 77
- Position: Defensive tackle

Personal information
- Born: November 27, 1952 (age 73); Warren, Ohio, U.S.
- Listed height: 6 ft 3 in (1.91 m)
- Listed weight: 255 lb (116 kg)

Career information
- High school: Warren G. Harding (Warren)
- College: Montana State (1971–1973)
- NFL draft: 1974: 1st round, 23rd overall pick

Career history

Playing
- Cincinnati Bengals (1974–1976); Tampa Bay Buccaneers (1977–1981)

Coaching
- Tampa Bay Buccaneers (1984) Special teams coordinator & defensive assistant; Illinois (1985) Graduate assistant; Illinois (1986–1987) Defensive line coach & special teams coordinator; Purdue (1988–1989) Defensive line coach & special teams coordinator; Atlanta Falcons (1990–2000) Defensive line coach; St. Louis Rams (2001–2005) Defensive line coach; Buffalo Bills (2006–2008) Defensive line coach; Houston Texans (2009–2014) Defensive line coach; Denver Broncos (2015–2022) Defensive line coach

Awards and highlights
- As a player: PFWA All-Rookie Team (1974); First-team All-American (1973); First-team Little All-American (1973); Montana State Bobcats No. 77 retired; As a coach: Super Bowl champion (50)

Career NFL statistics
- Sacks: 18
- Fumble recoveries: 11
- Stats at Pro Football Reference
- College Football Hall of Fame

William Wallace Kollar (born November 27, 1952) is an American football coach and former player. Kollar played as a defensive tackle in the National Football League (NFL) for the Cincinnati Bengals from 1974 to 1976, and the Tampa Bay Buccaneers from 1977 to 1981. Kollar has 34 years of coaching experience, including the last 28 seasons coaching defensive linemen in the NFL. Before coming to Denver in 2015, he coached the defensive line for Houston (2009–2014), Buffalo (2006–2008), St. Louis (2001–2005) and Atlanta (1990–2000).

== Early life ==
Kollar grew up in Warren, Ohio and attended Warren G. Harding High School, graduating in 1970. He then attended Montana State University, where he was a three-time First-team All-Big Sky Conference selection and a two-time Little All-American. As a junior for the Bobcats, he was named the Big Sky Player of the Year. Kollar went on to earn Most Valuable Player honors at the 1974 Senior Bowl and was inducted into the Senior Bowl Hall of Fame in 2014. His jersey #77 has been retired by Montana State.

== Coaching career ==
=== Early years ===
He began coaching as a defensive assistant and special teams coach for the Tampa Bay Buccaneers under coach John McKay in 1984. He then spent three seasons at the University of Illinois, first as a graduate assistant and then a defensive line/special teams coach, and two years at Purdue University.

=== NFL ===
Kollar began his NFL coaching career as the defensive line coach for the Atlanta Falcons in 1990. He spent more than a decade (1990–2000) coaching the defensive line for the Falcons, highlighted by an NFC Championship in 1998 and an appearance in Super Bowl XXXIII against Denver. Kollar then spent five seasons coaching the defensive line in St. Louis. Kollar’s defensive line was instrumental in the Rams’ 2001 Super Bowl run as the club ranked third in the NFL in rush defense (85.9 ypg) while tying for the seventh-most sacks (45) in the league. Kollar then spent three years coaching the defensive line in Buffalo (2006–08), where he coached future All-Pro defensive tackle Kyle Williams and two-time Pro Bowl defensive end Aaron Schobel.

==== Houston Texans ====
Kollar joined the Houston Texans in 2009 and spent six years there, including his first five years as assistant head coach/defensive line. During his tenure with the Texans, the team ranked eighth in the NFL in total defense (329 .4 ypg) and third in the league in opponent third-down percentage (35.9). Kollar’s unit adjusted to the defense’s transition to a 3–4 scheme in 2011 under Houston Defensive Coordinator Wade Phillips. The Texans went on to post the third-largest defensive turnaround (−91.2 ypg) in NFL history in 2011. Defensive ends Mario Williams, Antonio Smith and J. J. Watt combined for five Pro Bowls playing for Kollar in Houston.

==== Denver Broncos ====
After the 2014 season, Kollar left the Texans and became the Denver Broncos defensive line coach, where he reunited with Gary Kubiak. On February 7, 2016, Kollar was part of the Broncos coaching staff that won Super Bowl 50. In the game, the Broncos defeated the Carolina Panthers by a score of 24–10.

== Personal life ==
Kollar and his wife, Jan, have two sons, Chad and Clint.

In 1995, Kollar was inducted into his hometown Warren Sports Hall of Fame. On April 10, 2014, he was named to the Senior Bowl Hall of Fame, commemorating the 40th anniversary of his being named MVP of the annual college all-star game.
