= David Herron =

American football player (born 1984)

No. 58, 52, 97
- Position: Linebacker

Personal information
- Born: June 17, 1984 (age 42); Warren, Ohio, U.S.
- Listed height: 6 ft 1 in (1.85 m)
- Listed weight: 248 lb (112 kg)

Career information
- High school: Warren G. Harding (Warren, Ohio)
- College: Michigan State
- NFL draft: 2007: undrafted

Career history
- Minnesota Vikings (2007)*; New England Patriots (2007); Minnesota Vikings (2007–2008); Kansas City Chiefs (2009); San Diego Chargers (2010); New York Jets (2011)*; Minnesota Vikings (2011)*; Las Vegas Locomotives (2012)
- * Offseason or practice squad member only

Career NFL statistics
- Total tackles: 23
- Stats at Pro Football Reference

David Leon Herron Jr. (born June 17, 1984) is an American former professional football player who was a linebacker in the National Football League (NFL). He played football at Warren G. Harding High School and college football for the Michigan State Spartans. He was signed by the Minnesota Vikings as an undrafted free agent in 2007.

Herron was also a member of the New England Patriots, Kansas City Chiefs, San Diego Chargers, New York Jets, and Las Vegas Locomotives. He is the older brother of former Indianapolis Colts backup running back Daniel Herron.
