= David Arnold (American football) =

American football player (born 1966)

No. 25, 50
- Positions: Cornerback, safety

Personal information
- Born: November 21, 1966 (age 59); Warren, Ohio, U.S.
- Listed height: 6 ft 3 in (1.91 m)
- Listed weight: 208 lb (94 kg)

Career information
- High school: Warren G. Harding (Warren, Ohio)
- College: Michigan
- NFL draft: 1989: 5th round, 118th overall pick

Career history
- Pittsburgh Steelers (1989); Houston Oilers (1990)*; Hamilton Tiger-Cats (1992)
- * Offseason or practice squad member only

Awards and highlights
- First-team All-Big Ten (1988)

Career NFL statistics
- Games played: 15
- Stats at Pro Football Reference

David Paul Arnold (born November 21, 1966) is an American former professional football player. He played college football as a defensive back for the University of Michigan from 1985 to 1988. He played professional football in the National Football League (NFL) for the Pittsburgh Steelers during the 1989 NFL season.

== Early life ==
Arnold was born in Warren, Ohio, in 1966. He attended Warren G. Harding High School in Warren, Ohio.

== University of Michigan ==
Arnold enrolled at the University of Michigan in 1985 and played college football as a defensive back for head coach Bo Schembechler's Michigan Wolverines football teams from 1985 to 1988. He started two games at cornerback in 1986, nine games in 1987, and 10 games in 1988. He was selected by conference coaches as a first-team defensive back on the 1988 All-Big Ten Conference football team. In four years at Michigan, he recorded 105 tackles, 15 pass breakups, five interceptions, and three fumble recoveries.

== Professional football ==
Arnold was selected by the Pittsburgh Steelers in the fifth round (118th overall pick) of the 1989 NFL draft. He appeared in 15 games, none as a starter, for the Steelers during the 1989 NFL season. In February 1990, Arnold was taken from the Steelers by the Houston Oilers pursuant to Plan B free agency. Arnold signed a three-year contract with the Oilers, but he did not appear in any games for the Oilers.
