= James Ward Packard =

American businessman

- Born: November 5, 1863; Warren, Ohio, U.S.
- Died: March 20, 1928 (aged 64); Cleveland, Ohio, U.S.
- Occupation: Industrialist
- Spouse: Elizabeth Gillmer
- Relatives: William Doud Packard (brother); Alaska P. Davidson (sister)

James Ward Packard (November 5, 1863 – March 20, 1928) was an American industrialist who, alongside his elder brother William, created the Packard Motor Car Company and Packard Electric Company.

== Early life ==
James Ward Packard was born in Warren, Ohio, on November 5, 1863, the son of Mary Elizabeth Doud and Warren Packard. He had a brother named William and sisters named Alaska, Carlotta, and Cornelia. Alaska later gained fame as the first female FBI agent. From 1880 to 1884, Packard studied mechanical engineering at Lehigh University in Bethlehem, Pennsylvania.

== Career ==
After he graduated, Packard and his brother William founded the Packard Electric Company in 1890, through which they manufactured incandescent carbon arc lamps. In 1893, the brothers formed a partnership with Winton Motor Carriage Company investor George L. Weiss called Packard & Weiss. The first Packard automobile was released in 1899. In 1900, the company incorporated as the Ohio Automobile Company and was renamed the Packard Motor Car Company in 1902.

The company relocated to Detroit in 1903. The company eventually merged with the Studebaker Corporation in 1954, and the last Packard was made in 1958. Following the company relocation to Detroit, the Packard brothers focused on making automotive electrical systems via the Packard Electric Company. General Motors acquired the company in 1932, renaming it Delphi Packard Electric Systems in 1995. The company was spun off and became independent of GM in 1999.

== Death ==
Packard fell ill in 1925 and underwent surgery for cancer the following year. He spent his final 16 months at the Cleveland Clinic Hospital, where he died at the age of 64 on March 20, 1928. He was survived by his wife, Elizabeth Gillmer, with whom he had no children.

== Legacy ==
Packard Park in Warren, Ohio, is on land donated by the Packards. The James Ward Packard Laboratory of Mechanical and Electrical Engineering at Lehigh University was funded by him and completed in 1929, the year after he died.

In 1927, Packard commissioned Patek Philippe to create a watch so complicated that it could never be outdone; banker Henry Graves Jr. spent five times as much to surpass him in 1933, paying the same watchmaker to create the then unsurpassed Patek Philippe Henry Graves Supercomplication.
