= William Doud Packard =

American automobile manufacturer

- Born: November 3, 1861; Warren, Ohio
- Died: November 11, 1923 (aged 62)
- Occupation: Industrialist
- Employer: Packard Motor Car Company
- Spouse(s): Anne Storer, Kathryn Bruder
- Parent(s): Warren and Mary Elizabeth Doud Packard

William Doud Packard (November 3, 1861 – November 11, 1923) was an American automobile manufacturer who founded the Packard Motor Car Company and Packard Electric Company with his younger brother James Ward Packard.

== Life and career ==
Packard was born in Warren, Ohio, on November 3, 1861, to Warren and Mary Elizabeth Doud Packard. He was joined by his younger brother, James Ward Packard (1863–1928), in founding the Packard Electric Company in Warren in 1890, where they manufactured incandescent carbon arc lamps. He had three sisters, Carlotta Packard, Cornelia Olive Packard, and Alaska P. Davidson (1868–1934), who became the first female FBI agent.

After disappointment with a Winton Company car he purchased, James formed a partnership with his brother and Winton investor George L. Weiss called Packard & Weiss. The first Packard automobile was released in 1899. In 1900, the company incorporated as the Ohio Automobile Company and was renamed the Packard Motor Car Company in 1902. The company relocated to Detroit in 1903, and merged with the Studebaker Corporation in 1954; the last Packard was made in 1958.

Following Packard Motor Company's relocation to Detroit, the Packard brothers focused on making automotive electrical systems through the separate Packard Electric Company. General Motors acquired Packard Electric in 1932, renaming it Delphi Packard Electric Systems in 1995. The company was spun off and became independent of GM in 1999.

In 1915, W.D. Packard commissioned a summer home to be designed by a famous architectural firm in New York City, Warren and Wetmore. This home is located on the Chautauqua Institution. It still serves as a single-family residence. There is a duplicate in Warren, Ohio.

Packard donated the land for Packard Park in Warren, Ohio, and the W.D. Packard Music Hall and Packard Band were funded by him.
