= Warren, Ohio =

- City
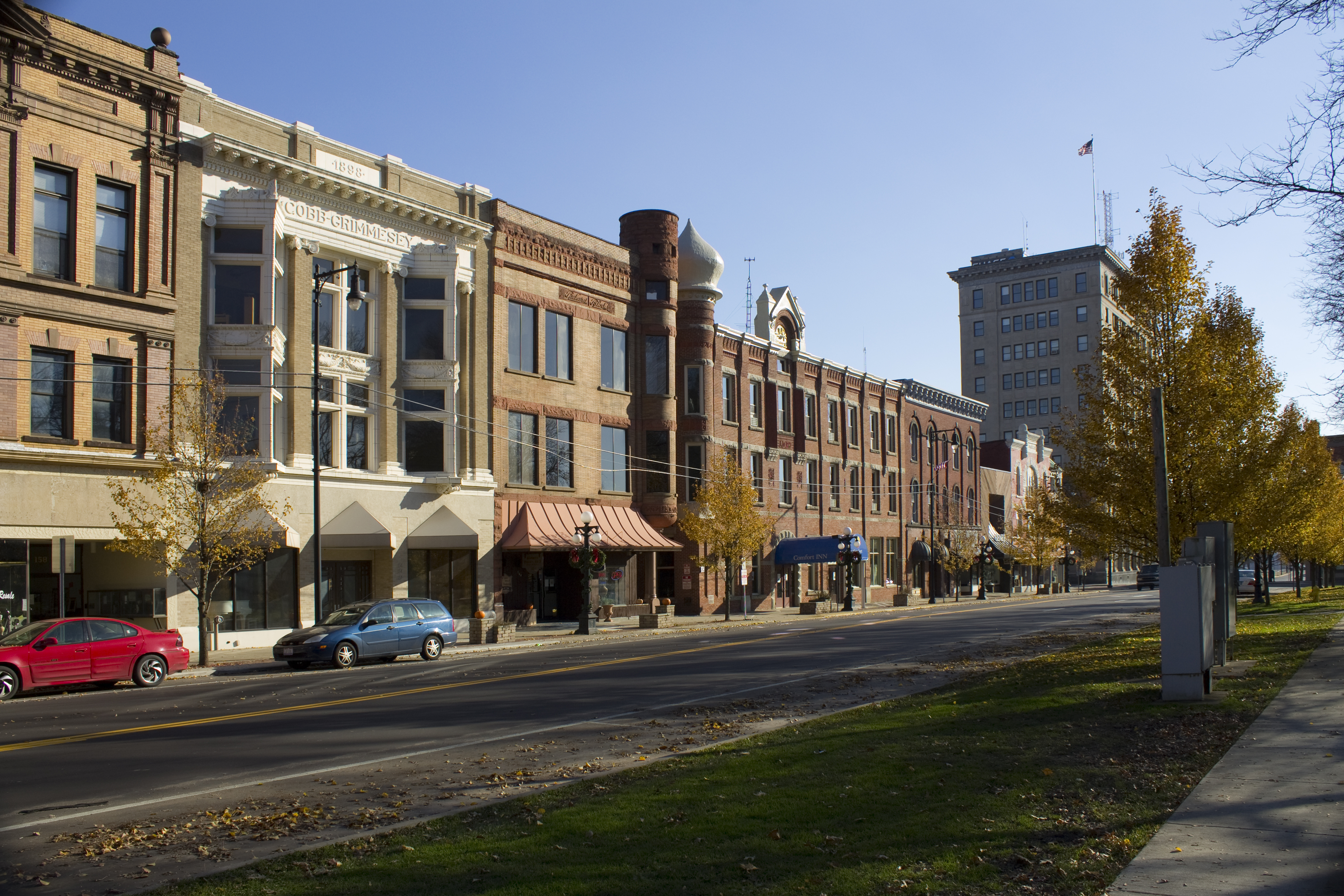
- Warren Commercial Historic District
- Motto: "Historic Capital of the Western Reserve"
- Interactive map of Warren, Ohio
- Location within Ohio Location within the United States
- Coordinates: 41°14′18″N 80°48′52″W
- Country: United States
- State: Ohio
- County: Trumbull
- Founded: 1798

Area
  - City: 16.12 sq mi (41.75 km^{2})
  - Land: 15.96 sq mi (41.33 km^{2})
  - Water: 0.16 sq mi (0.42 km^{2})
- Elevation: 886 ft (270 m)

Population (2020)
  - City: 39,201
  - Density: 2,456.8/sq mi (948.57/km^{2})
  - Metro: 430,591 (US: 125th)
- Time zone: UTC-5 (EST)
  - Summer (DST): UTC-4 (EDT)
- ZIP codes: 44481-44488
- Area codes: 330, 234
- FIPS code: 39-80892
- GNIS feature ID: 1087046
- Website: warren.org

Warren is a city in Trumbull County, Ohio, United States, and its county seat. The population was 39,201 at the 2020 census. Located along the Mahoning River, Warren lies approximately 14 miles (23 km) northwest of Youngstown and 56 miles (90 km) southeast of Cleveland. It was the historical county seat of the Connecticut Western Reserve and is a principal city of the Mahoning Valley metropolitan area in Northeast Ohio.

== History ==
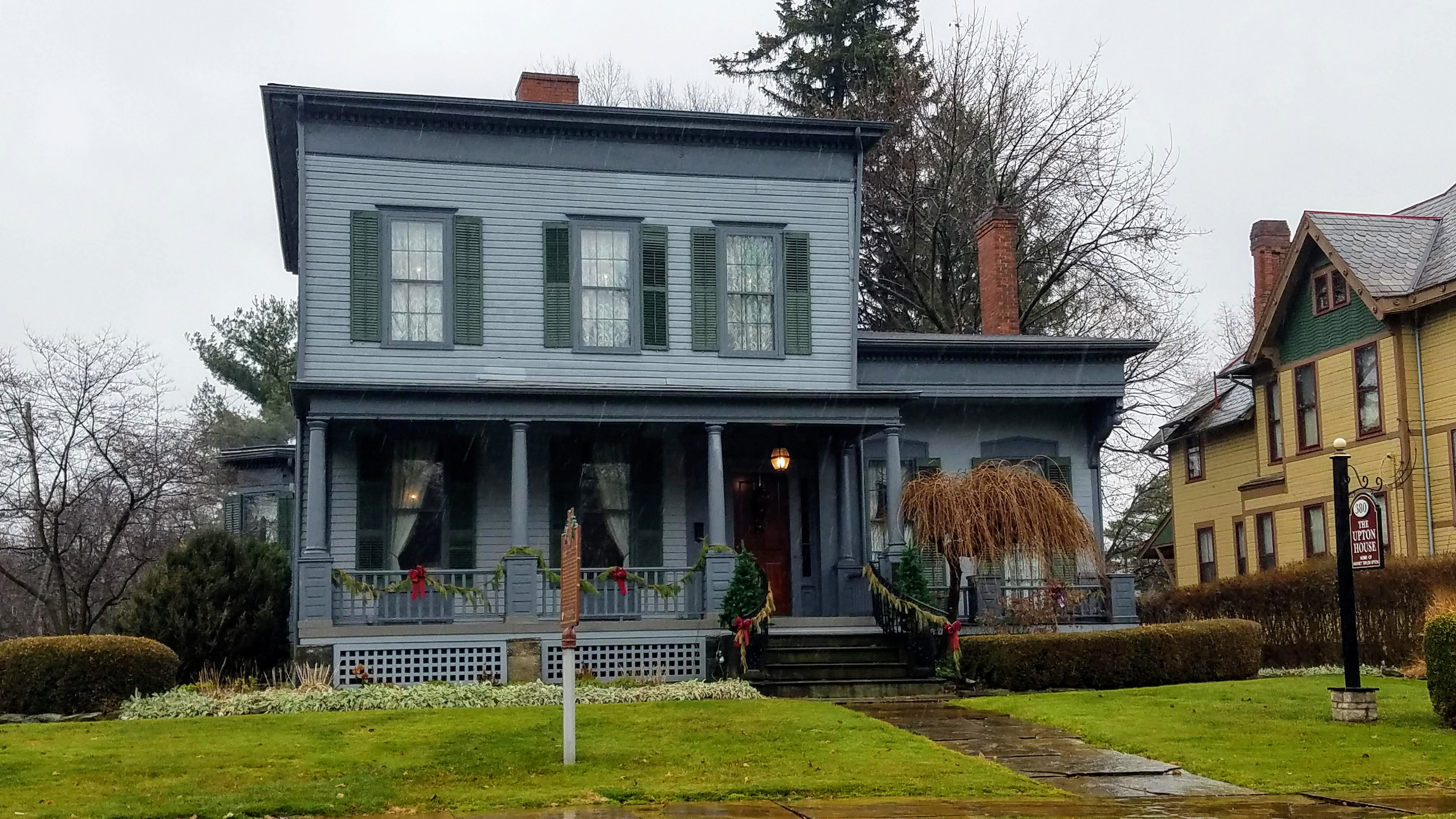
The Harriet Taylor Upton House was the residence of suffragett Harriet Taylor Upton and headquarters of the National American Woman's Suffrage Association.

Ephraim Quinby founded Warren in 1798, on 441 acres (1.78 km^{2}) of land that he purchased from the Connecticut Land Company, as part of the Connecticut Western Reserve. Quinby named the town for the town's surveyor, Moses Warren. The town was the county seat of the Western Reserve, then became the Trumbull County seat in 1801. In 1833, Warren contained county buildings, two printing offices, a bank, five mercantile stores, and about 600 inhabitants.

Warren had a population of nearly 1,600 people in 1846. In that same year, the town had five churches, twenty stores, three newspaper offices, one bank, one wool factory and two flourmills. In June 1846, a fire destroyed several buildings on one side of the town square, but residents soon replaced them with new stores and other businesses. Warren became an important center of trade for farmers living in the surrounding countryside during this period. Songwriter Stephen Foster, his wife Jane McDowell, and their daughter Marion lived briefly in Warren.

During the latter decades of the nineteenth century and throughout the twentieth century, Warren remained an important trading and manufacturing center. By 1888, four railroads connected the community with other parts of Ohio. In that same year, there were five newspaper offices, seven churches, three banks and numerous manufacturing firms in Warren. The businesses manufactured a wide variety of products including linseed oil, furniture, barrel staves, wool fabric, blinds, incandescent bulbs, automobiles and carriages; however, the leading companies were the Packard Electric Company and Packard Motor Car Company, both founded in the 1890s in Warren by brothers James Ward Packard and William Doud Packard. Warren was the first town in the U.S. to have an electric street illumination, provided by Packard Electric. Warren's population was 5,973 people in 1890. Construction began on the Trumbull County Courthouse in downtown Warren on Thanksgiving Day, 1895.

Warren continued to grow in the twentieth century. During the late nineteenth and early twentieth centuries, steel production was a major industry in the county because of large deposits of coal and iron ore in surrounding counties. In recent years, many Warren residents have worked in local service and retail sales businesses. In 2000, Warren was Trumbull County's most populated community, with 46,832 residents. Many examples of late 19th and early 20th century architectural styles still stand in downtown Warren, including the Trumbull County Courthouse, which contains one of the largest courtrooms in the state of Ohio, and the Trumbull County Carnegie Law Library; in addition to office buildings, banks, stores, and homes surrounding the Courthouse Square area.

John Ashbery mentions Warren in his poem 'Pyrography', first published in an exhibition catalogue in 1976 and included in his 1977 collection Houseboat Days. In a later interview, Ashbery said he had never visited the town.

== Geography ==
According to the United States Census Bureau, the city has a total area of 16.16 square miles (41.85 km^{2}), of which 16.13 square miles (41.78 km^{2}) is land and 0.03 square miles (0.08 km^{2}) is water. Its climate type is Dfb.

=== Climate ===
Climate data for Warren, Ohio (1991–2020 normals, extremes 1893–present)
Month	Jan	Feb	Mar	Apr	May	Jun	Jul	Aug	Sep	Oct	Nov	Dec	Year
Record high °F (°C)	74 (23)	77 (25)	83 (28)	90 (32)	98 (37)	101 (38)	105 (41)	105 (41)	100 (38)	95 (35)	81 (27)	76 (24)	105 (41)
Mean maximum °F (°C)	59.2 (15.1)	60.5 (15.8)	71.2 (21.8)	80.6 (27.0)	86.5 (30.3)	90.6 (32.6)	91.8 (33.2)	90.9 (32.7)	88.1 (31.2)	79.8 (26.6)	69.7 (20.9)	60.4 (15.8)	92.8 (33.8)
Mean daily maximum °F (°C)	34.7 (1.5)	37.6 (3.1)	46.7 (8.2)	60.3 (15.7)	71.3 (21.8)	79.1 (26.2)	82.9 (28.3)	81.6 (27.6)	75.1 (23.9)	63.0 (17.2)	50.4 (10.2)	39.4 (4.1)	60.2 (15.7)
Daily mean °F (°C)	25.8 (−3.4)	27.4 (−2.6)	35.8 (2.1)	47.6 (8.7)	58.3 (14.6)	66.7 (19.3)	70.7 (21.5)	69.1 (20.6)	62.5 (16.9)	51.3 (10.7)	40.5 (4.7)	31.3 (−0.4)	48.9 (9.4)
Mean daily minimum °F (°C)	16.8 (−8.4)	17.2 (−8.2)	24.8 (−4.0)	35.0 (1.7)	45.3 (7.4)	54.3 (12.4)	58.5 (14.7)	56.7 (13.7)	50.0 (10.0)	39.5 (4.2)	30.6 (−0.8)	23.2 (−4.9)	37.7 (3.2)
Mean minimum °F (°C)	−5.5 (−20.8)	−2.4 (−19.1)	7.1 (−13.8)	20.4 (−6.4)	30.2 (−1.0)	40.0 (4.4)	47.2 (8.4)	45.1 (7.3)	37.1 (2.8)	26.1 (−3.3)	16.9 (−8.4)	6.4 (−14.2)	−8.0 (−22.2)
Record low °F (°C)	−26 (−32)	−24 (−31)	−17 (−27)	5 (−15)	20 (−7)	28 (−2)	37 (3)	26 (−3)	26 (−3)	13 (−11)	−7 (−22)	−18 (−28)	−26 (−32)
Average precipitation inches (mm)	3.11 (79)	2.31 (59)	3.13 (80)	3.76 (96)	3.76 (96)	4.10 (104)	4.64 (118)	3.49 (89)	3.67 (93)	3.30 (84)	2.61 (66)	2.93 (74)	40.81 (1,037)
Average snowfall inches (cm)	9.6 (24)	6.4 (16)	4.4 (11)	0.2 (0.51)	0.0 (0.0)	0.0 (0.0)	0.0 (0.0)	0.0 (0.0)	0.0 (0.0)	0.0 (0.0)	0.8 (2.0)	6.5 (17)	27.9 (71)
Average precipitation days (≥ 0.01 in)	15.9	11.3	12.2	13.5	14.2	12.3	11.4	10.2	10.8	12.7	11.9	13.1	149.5
Average snowy days (≥ 0.1 in)	7.3	4.9	2.6	0.2	0.0	0.0	0.0	0.0	0.0	0.0	0.9	5.1	21.0
Source: NOAA

== Demographics ==
Historical population
Census	Pop.	Note	%±
1820	435		—
1830	501		15.2%
1840	1,066		112.8%
1860	2,402		—
1870	3,457		43.9%
1880	4,428		28.1%
1890	5,973		34.9%
1900	8,529		42.8%
1910	11,081		29.9%
1920	27,050		144.1%
1930	41,062		51.8%
1940	42,837		4.3%
1950	49,856		16.4%
1960	59,648		19.6%
1970	63,494		6.4%
1980	56,629		−10.8%
1990	50,793		−10.3%
2000	46,832		−7.8%
2010	41,558		−11.3%
2020	39,201		−5.7%
U.S. Decennial Census

As of 2015, 95.5% of the population spoke English, 1.6% Greek, 1.1% Spanish, and 0.9% Italian in their homes.

=== 2020 census ===
As of the 2020 census, Warren had a population of 39,201. The median age was 39.1 years. 22.3% of residents were under the age of 18 and 17.8% of residents were 65 years of age or older. For every 100 females there were 96.4 males, and for every 100 females age 18 and over there were 94.5 males age 18 and over.

99.7% of residents lived in urban areas, while 0.3% lived in rural areas.

There were 16,409 households in Warren, of which 26.3% had children under the age of 18 living in them. Of all households, 26.8% were married-couple households, 23.4% were households with a male householder and no spouse or partner present, and 40.9% were households with a female householder and no spouse or partner present. About 38.8% of all households were made up of individuals and 15.8% had someone living alone who was 65 years of age or older.

There were 18,681 housing units, of which 12.2% were vacant. The homeowner vacancy rate was 2.8% and the rental vacancy rate was 10.4%.

Racial composition as of the 2020 census
Race	Number	Percent
White	24,595	62.7%
Black or African American	10,944	27.9%
American Indian and Alaska Native	66	0.2%
Asian	153	0.4%
Native Hawaiian and Other Pacific Islander	10	0.0%
Some other race	449	1.1%
Two or more races	2,984	7.6%
Hispanic or Latino (of any race)	1,104	2.8%

=== 2010 census ===
As of the census of 2010, there were 41,557 people, 17,003 households, and 10,013 families living in the city. The population density was 2,576.4 inhabitants per square mile (994.8/km^{2}). There were 20,384 housing units at an average density of 1,263.7 per square mile (487.9/km^{2}). The racial makeup of the city was 67.7% White, 27.7% African American, 0.2% Native American, 0.4% Asian, 0.7% from other races, and 3.3% from two or more races. Hispanic or Latino of any race were 1.9% of the population.

Of the 17,003 households 29.8% had children under the age of 18 living with them, 31.8% were married couples living together, 21.3% had a female householder with no husband present, 5.8% had a male householder with no wife present, and 41.1% were non-families. 35.6% of households were one person and 13.8% were one person aged 65 or older. The average household size was 2.30 and the average family size was 2.97.

The median age was 38.3 years. 23.7% of residents were under the age of 18; 9.3% were between the ages of 18 and 24; 25.2% were from 25 to 44; 25.9% were from 45 to 64; and 16% were 65 or older. The gender makeup of the city was 48.1% male and 51.9% female.

=== 2000 census ===
At the 2000 census, there were 46,832 people, 19,288 households and 12,035 families living in the city. The population density was 2,912.4 inhabitants per square mile (1,124.5/km^{2}). There were 21,279 housing units at an average density of 1,322.9 per square mile (510.8/km^{2}). The racial makeup of the city was 60.94% White, 36.20% African American, 0.13% Native American, 0.42% Asian, 0.03% Pacific Islander, 0.30% from other races and 1.98% from two or more races. Hispanic or Latino of any race were 1.04% of the population.

Of the 19,288 households 29.5% had children under the age of 18 living with them, 38.4% were married couples living together, 19.4% had a female householder with no husband present and 37.6% were non-families. 32.9% of households were one person and 13.7% were one person aged 65 or older. The average household size was 2.37 and the average family size was 3.01.

The age distribution was 26.3% under the age of 18, 8.6% from 18 to 24, 27.3% from 25 to 44, 21.0% from 45 to 64 and 16.8% 65 or older. The median age was 36 years. For every 100 females, there were 86.8 males. For every 100 females age 18 and over, there were 81.9 males.

The median household income was $30,147 and the median family income was $36,158. Males had a median income of $32,317 versus $23,790 for females. The per capita income for the city was $16,808. About 16.2% of families and 19.4% of the population were below the poverty line, including 29.8% of those under age 18 and 9.9% of those age 65 or over.

== Economy ==
Major employers in Warren include St. Joseph Warren Hospital, the Tribune Chronicle, and Thomas Steel Strip. In 2024, paper manufacturer Kimberly-Clark announced plans to build a new production facility in Warren. Historically, heavy industry dominated the local economy; Trumbull Steel Company was among the city's largest employers in the early 20th century and became part of Republic Steel in 1928, with the former Trumbull Steel mill continuing operations under various owners until 2012.

== Recreation ==
The Trumbull Country Club hosted the Youngstown Kitchens Trumbull Open on the LPGA Tour in 1960. From 1993 to 2000, Avalon Lakes Golf Club hosted the Giant Eagle LPGA Classic golf tournament on the LPGA Tour.

== Government ==
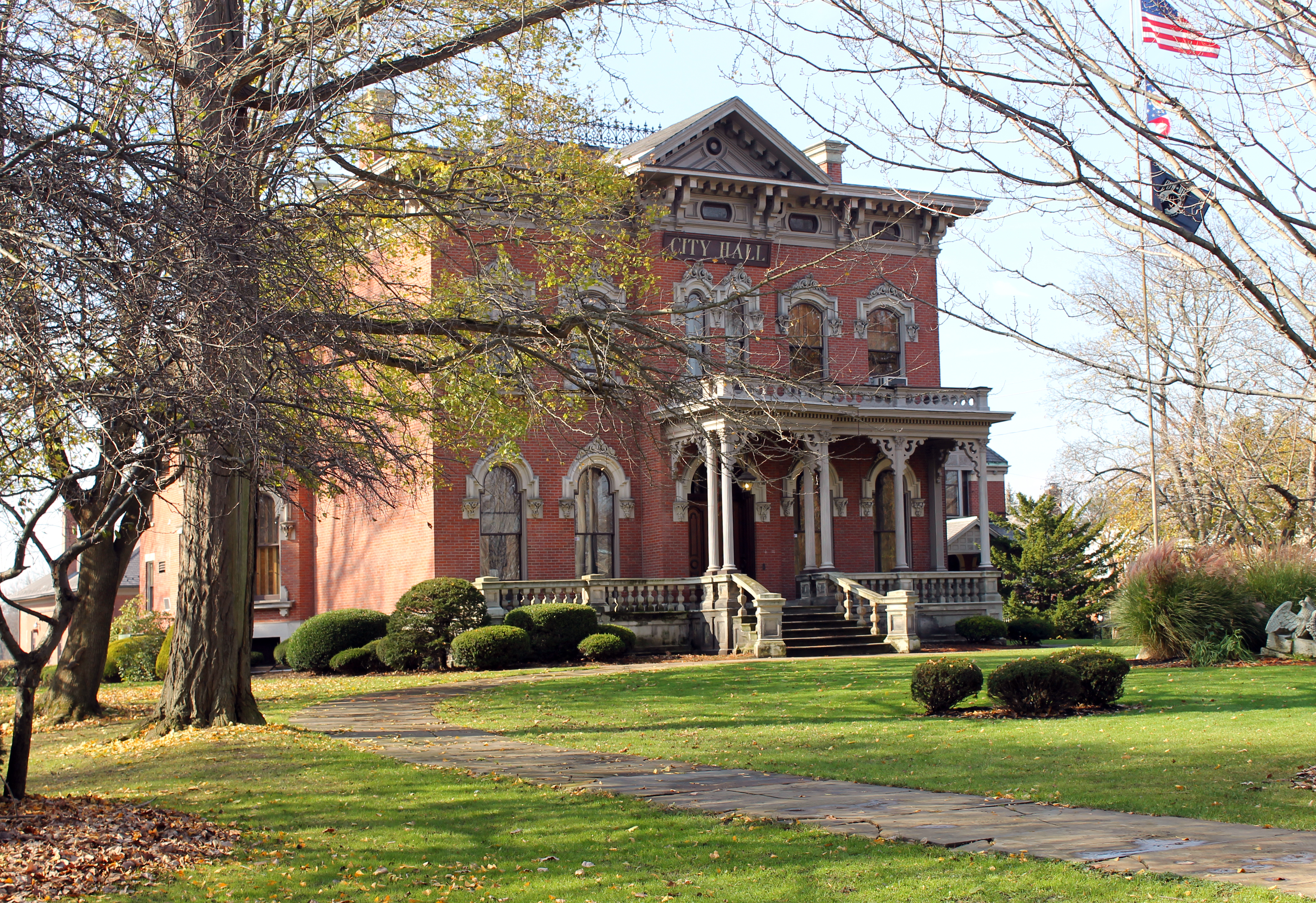
Warren City Hall

Warren operates under a mayor–council government. The mayor is directly elected to four-year terms. William "Doug" Franklin has been the 35th mayor of Warren since 2011. The city council is composed of three at-large members, seven ward council members, and one council president, who each serve two-year terms. As of April 2026, the following elected officials were serving in the government of the City of Warren:

City Council
Party	Name	Constituency	Elected	Term End
Democratic	John Brown	Council President	2025	2027
Democratic	Helen Rucker	At-large	2025	2027
Democratic	Michael O'Brien	At-large	2025	2027
Democratic	Greg Thumm	At-large	2025	2027
Independent	Todd Johnson	1st Ward	2025	2027
Democratic	Tina S. Milner	2nd Ward	2025	2027
Democratic	Greg Greathouse	3rd Ward	2025	2027
Democratic	James Shaffer	4th Ward	2025	2027
Democratic	Michael Shrodek	5th Ward	2025	2027
Democratic	Honeya Price	6th Ward	2025	2027
Democratic	Ronald White, Sr.	7th Ward	2025	2027

Executive
Party	Name	Office	Elected	Term End
Democratic	Doug Franklin	Mayor	2023	2027
Democratic	Vincent S. Flask	Auditor	2023	2027
Democratic	Enzo Cantalamessa	Law Director	2023	2027
Democratic	Tom Letson	Treasurer	2025	2029

== Education ==
Warren is served by the public Warren City School District. The district includes four preK–8 schools and Warren G. Harding High School. A second high school, Western Reserve High School on the city's south side, formerly operated from 1966 to 1990. In the early 21st century, the Warren City School District underwent a redistricting process due to declining population, which saw the construction of a new Warren G. Harding High School and the demolition of several early-20th century elementary and junior high schools.

The Roman Catholic Diocese of Youngstown operates the private John F. Kennedy Catholic School, which includes a Lower Campus for grades kindergarten–5 and an Upper Campus for grades 6–12.

== Media ==
Warren is home to the Tribune Chronicle, a daily local newspaper serving Warren and its vicinity in Trumbull County. It traces its history to the Trump of Fame in 1812, the first newspaper in what had been the Connecticut Western Reserve. In 2008, USA Today reported daily circulation of 35,471 for the Tribune Chronicle.

Warren is part of the Youngstown media market, and is served by Youngstown-based television and radio stations. AM stations WHKZ and WYWO are licensed to Warren.

== Transportation ==
Warren is bypassed by a freeway carrying Ohio State Route 82 (SR 82) and in places, SR 5. SR 5 heads southwest to the Ohio Turnpike (Interstate 80), while SR 82 heads east to the north–south SR 11 freeway. Additionally, US Route 422 and SR 45 travel through the city, while SR 46 skirts its eastern edge.

Warren is served by the Western Reserve Transit Authority, which provides bus service throughout Mahoning County.

== Notable people ==
- Roger Ailes, television executive
- Red Ames, Major League Baseball player
- David Arnold, University of Michigan and NFL football player
- James L. Baughman, historian
- Aaron Brown, Ohio State University and NFL player
- Joey Browner, USC and NFL player
- Keith Browner, USC and NFL player
- Ross Browner, Notre Dame and NFL player, College Football Hall of Famer
- Prescott Burgess, University of Michigan and NFL player with Baltimore Ravens
- Michael Capellas, former CEO Of Compaq Computer Corporation
- Genevieve R. Cline, federal judge
- Kenyon Cox, painter, illustrator, muralist, writer and teacher
- Joseph S. Curtis, Wisconsin State Assemblyman and lawyer
- Alaska Packard Davidson, first female FBI special agent
- Zell Hart Deming, suffragist, philanthropist and newspaper editor
- Linda DeScenna, film set decorator
- Jerry Douglas, Grammy Award-winning musician
- William H. Gass, novelist, short-story writer, essayist, and academic
- Elizabeth George, novelist, creator of The Inspector Lynley Mysteries
- Randy Gradishar, Ohio State University and NFL player
- Dave Grohl, frontman for the Foo Fighters and drummer for Nirvana
- John Harsh, Wisconsin State Assembly
- David Herron, NFL player
- Hugh Hewitt, radio talk show host
- Jason Kokrak, professional golfer on the PGA Tour
- Bill Kollar, Montana State and NFL player, NFL assistant coach
- Braeden Lemasters, musician Wallows, actor
- Mario Manningham, University of Michigan and NFL player
- Vincent Mauri, distance runner
- James Ward Packard and brother William Doud Packard, industrialists
- Johnny Ace Palmer, magician
- Ronald A. Parise, NASA astronaut
- Austin Pendleton, actor
- Greg Reeves, musician
- Natalie Scala, industrial engineer and university professor
- Tanner Scott, MLB Player
- Karl Singer, football player
- De'Veon Smith, NFL player
- Korey Stringer, NFL player
- Harriet Taylor Upton, first woman vice-chairman of the Republican National Committee
- Paul Warfield, Ohio State University and NFL player, NFL Hall of Famer
- Forrest Wilson, author, winner of the Pulitzer Prize for Biography or Autobiography
- Chris Zylka, actor, The Secret Circle
